= Geese in Chinese poetry =

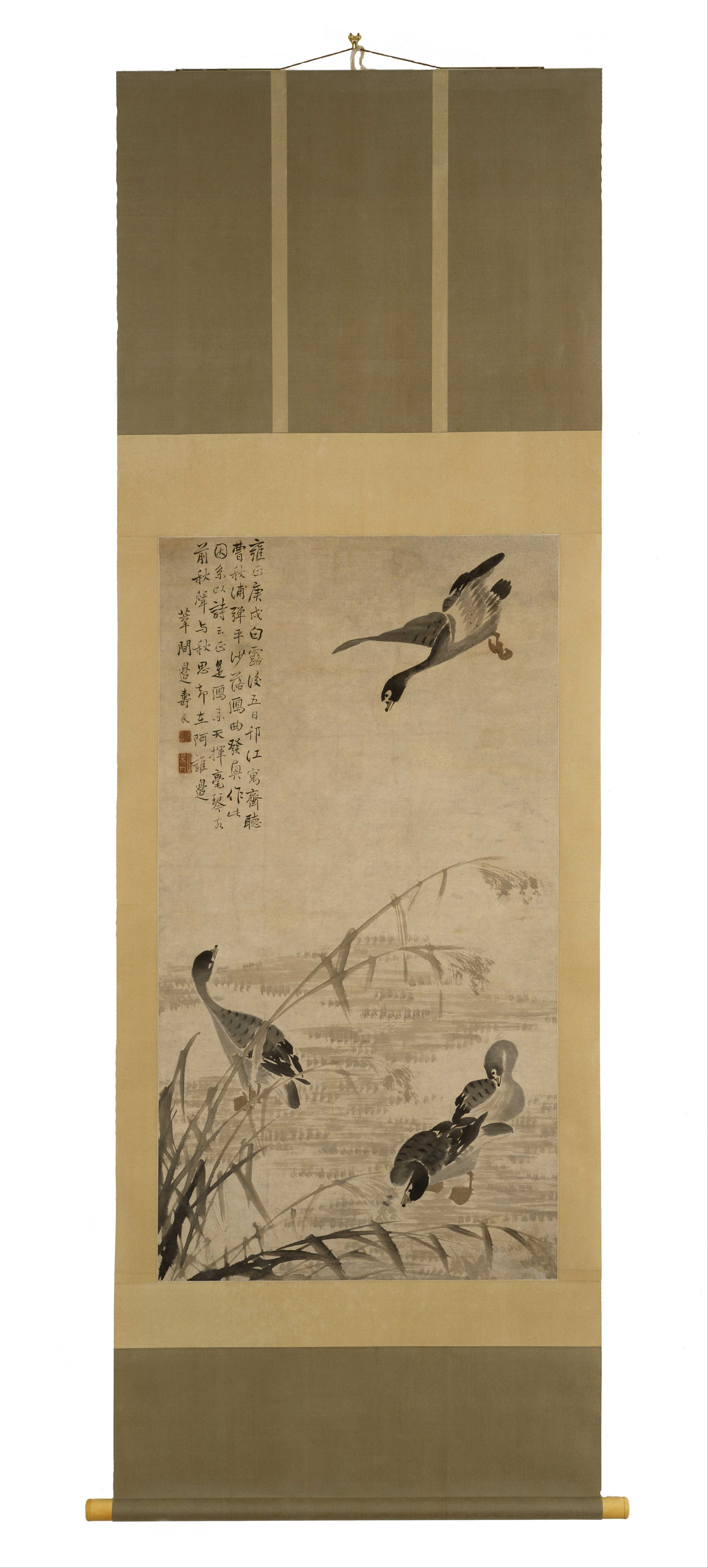
Geese Descending on a Sandbank. Their legs are highlighted with color. By Bian Shoumin (also, Weijian Laoren or Yigong, 1684–1752). According to the MFAH Website, Bian's inscribed poem reads: Just now wild geese came into the sky, As I waved my brush before the master of the qin [zither]; Autumn sounds meld with autumn thoughts As I stand beside I know not who.

Geese (genus Anser) are an important motif in Chinese poetry. Examples of goose imagery have an important place in Chinese poetry ranging from the Shijing and the Chu Ci poets through the poets of Han poetry and later poets of Tang poetry such as Li Bai, Wang Wei, Du Fu, and the Xiaoxiang poetry, especially in the poetry of the Song dynastic era. Various poetic concepts could be communicated by the inclusion of the imagery of geese in a poem, and the understanding of allusions to a goose or geese can help provide key insights into the poems of Classical Chinese poetry. Chinese sources typically distinguish between two types of geese, the domestic goose, and the wild goose: of the two, the wild goose is the more important for poetry, whether as significant of migratory seasonal change, or as "bearing a message of love from afar", by persons separated by a great distance (generally north and south, since that is how geese generally migrate), or as the "lone goose", bereft of both mate and flock.

== Background ==
Geese of various species are typical to China, they may be domestic or wild. Due to their migratory nature, wild geese tend to be a seasonal presence, either as temporary, nomadic settlers in an area, or often as seasonal migrants whose flight path takes them over vast areas where they may or may not land to rest at night.

=== Biology ===
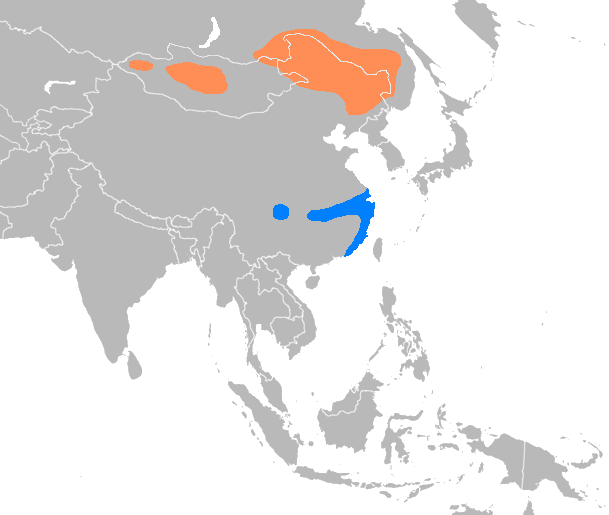
Anser cygnoides natural distribution in modern times, showing northern breeding areas in orange and southern wintering ranges in blue. Other species of geese inhabiting this mapped area show similar north–south migratory patterns, sometimes with much greater extents to their ranges, and more extensive north–south travel.

Geese are large birds belong to the family of the Anatidae, subfamily of the Anserinae, and the tribe of the Anserini. The geese in the genus Anser have a Holarctic distribution, and include the grey geese and white geese. White geese are sometimes included in Anser, and sometimes described as being in the genus Chen, and their breeding areas are in subarctic areas of North America and around the Bering Strait. The black geese are in the genus Branta and occur in the Palearctic realm: they are called "black" due to the coloring of their legs, bills, and parts of their plumage, which are black or dark grey. The family Anatidae includes ducks and swans. Unless domestic, geese are generally migratory, traveling lengthy distances in between their summer habitats in the north and their winter habitats in the south. In China, geese have been domesticated for thousands of years: these have primarily been bred from the wild species Anser cygnoides, and are also known as the Swan Goose or the Chinese Goose. True geese are difficult to differentiate into genus or species based on anatomical differences other than coloration, especially if the geese occur, as they often do in poetry, in the distance, flying, and perhaps even more heard than seen: but, the genus and species identification is not generally of importance in Chinese poetry, although whether the goose is wild or domestic is of importance. Geese are social animals, and tend to appear in flocks of many individuals; and, as they tend to pair up to mate, which as part of the process often includes a flying duet, with the male chasing the female through the air; and, often the flock will contain many breeding pairs. One of the distinctive features of flying flocks of geese is their typical "V" or wedge-shaped formation, and the loud vocalizations which accompany them on their flight. A lone goose is somewhat of an anomaly in nature. Geese and their eggs have been used for food, their feathers for thermal insulation and other purposes, and their arrivals and departures as seasonal indicators. Human interactions with geese have often included hunting wild geese with projectile weapons, raising and breeding domestic geese, or observing, and perhaps depicting them in paint or poetry.

=== Vocabulary: domestic versus wild ===
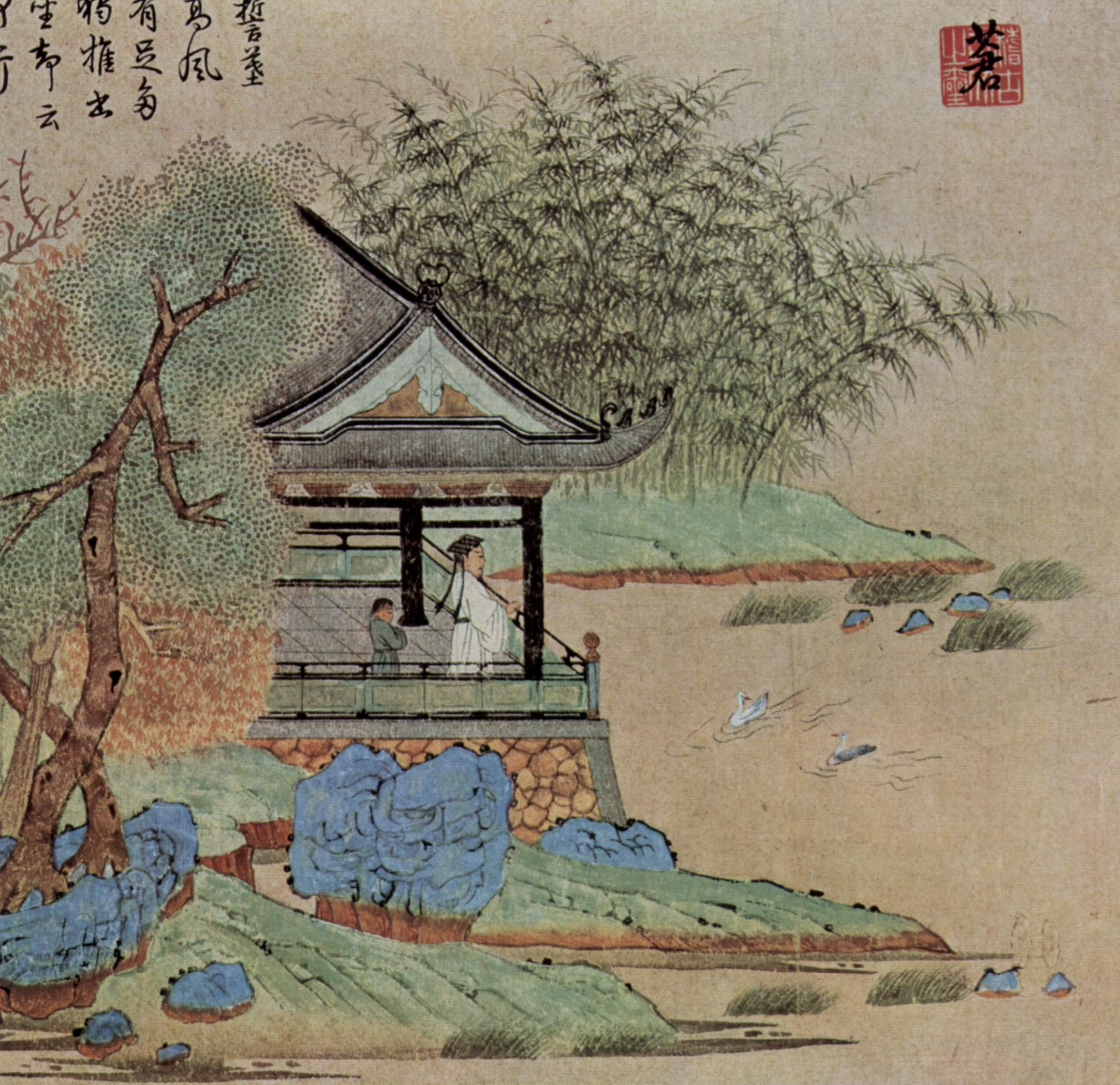
Calligrapher and goose-enthusiast Wang Xizhi viewing geese (鵝), by Qian Xuan, 1250-1300

The Chinese language typically distinguishes between domestic and wild geese, with separate words and characters for each. The common character for "wild goose" is 鴈 (with variant form 雁, both are yàn in Hanyu Pinyin, *ngan4 in Tang). The elements which make up these two characters are the same, except the variation in the part representing a bird uses one or the other of 2 common choices for this: both characters can be analyzed as representing a bird (鳥 or 隹) which flies from (dwellings) on cliffs (厂) in flocks that are in the shape of the character 人 (rén, meaning "person": the actual form used [亻] is a variant for character composition). The Classical character for domestic goose is 鵝 (Hanyu Pinyin é, Tang ngɑ). Another character commonly used for a wild goose is 鴻 (Pinyin: hóng, Tang *hung4): this is sometimes translated as a "bean goose", in English; however, since these species are similar to other geese in the genus Anser, this is not particularly important for most poetry, especially since there is less than complete agreement among the scientific experts in regard to these taxonomical details. Similarly, what nuance in meaning (if any), different from "wild goose", is to be understood by the phrase 鴻雁 in the Shijing?

=== Geese in Chinese symbolism ===
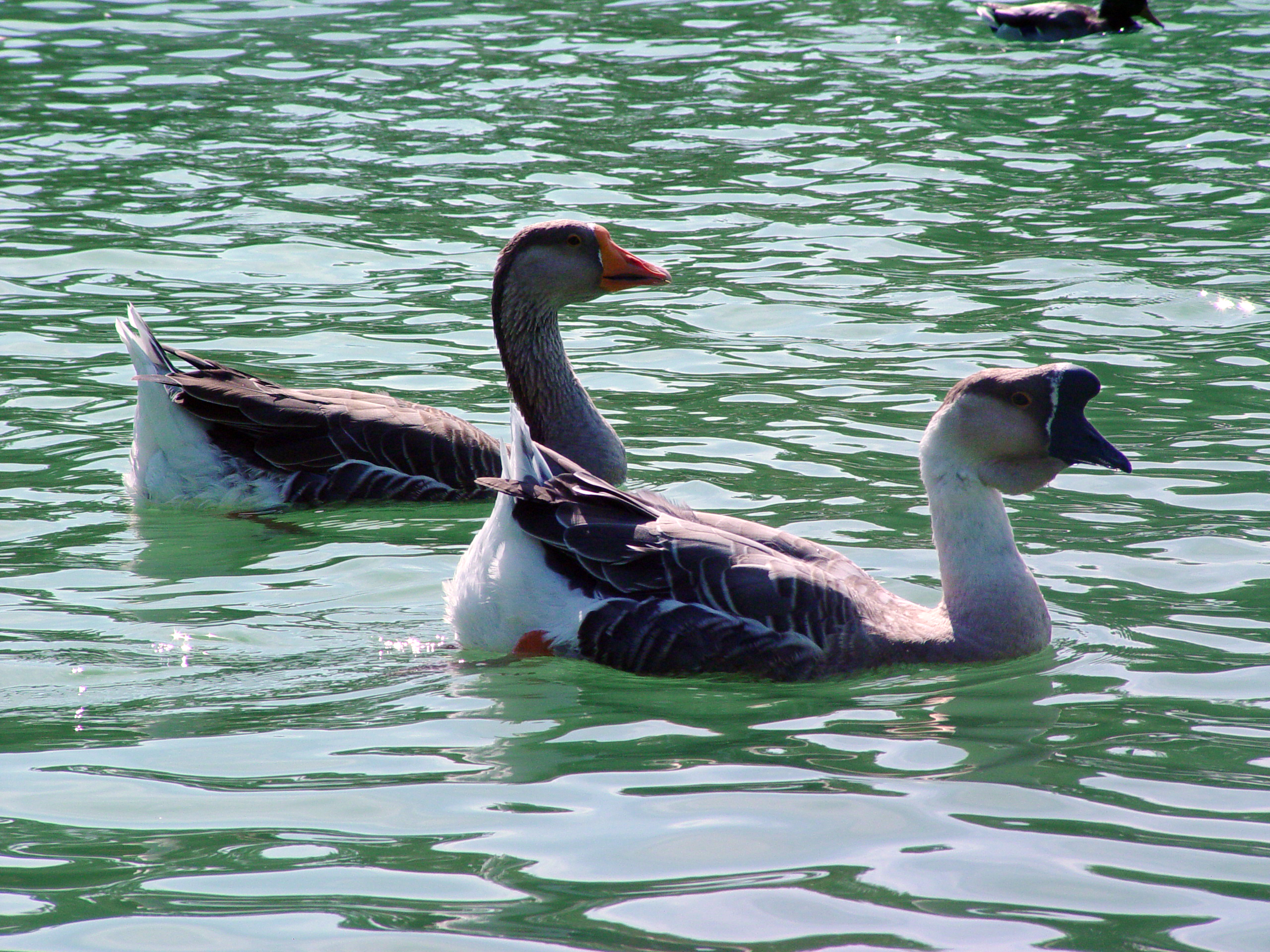
Domestic pair of Chinese geese swimming, male front, female rear.

==== Seasonal indications ====
Anciently, the wild goose was one of the 9 Chinese gù (雇), or migratory types of birds employed (the modern meaning of the word) as seasonal indicators for initiating appropriate agricultural practices: the annual autumnal appearance of wild geese indicated the time to begin the harvest gathering (Wilder & Ingram, sub #361, 僱). The annual migratory pattern of geese makes their bi-annual appearances in spring and autumn symbolically useful, as poetic short-hand for the changing seasons. The place of geese in the cosmological order was indicated by the conceptualization that the geese fly south to avoid the effects of the rise of the cold and dark associated with the rise of the yin forces of winter, in the balance of yin-yang; and when, in the balance, the yang forces begin to predominate, the geese fly up north to avoid the accompanying excess heat of summer (Murck, 75). Yin-yang is a religico-philosophical concept of how opposite and contrary forces are operated in the process of the natural world: how they give rise to each other through natural dualities, such as light and dark, high and low, hot and cold, fire and water, male and female, and life and death. In this system of thought, geese are thought to be part and parcel of the natural world's physical manifestation of yin and yang.

==== Flocking versus single ====
The symbolic connotations of geese depend somewhat on whether they appear in single, in pair, or in a flock; also whether they are wild or domestic. Geese have been thought to take one partner for life, male and female, thus the goose can symbolize marital bliss; and, due to their seasonally migratory nature, geese are symbolic of seasonal change and the passage of time, and the mutual presentation and exchange of geese may form part of marriage rituals (Eberhard, 132, sub "Goose"). Eberhard also here remarks on the "very old custom" of the use of a goose as an engagement present (attested to in the Shijing). The lone goose is a symbol of loss: either the loss of a mate, or of the whole flock, and thus is used as an image to evoke feelings of sadness or pity.

=== Seasons of the goose ===
Yin-yang symbol. Originally gnomonically derived.

Geese are not used as one of the 12 "Chinese zodiac" animals which are used as signs to represent particular periods of time. However, in poetry, the seasonal migratory flights of geese are used poetically in connection with the passage of the seasons: often poems use geese in connections which hint at what season it is by relating this to the direction which the geese are flying, north in spring for the summer and south in the autumn for the winter. When the weather warms, and the geese fly north, beyond ken of the poet, perhaps even beyond the northern borders, the poem may speak of the geese flying beyond the mountains, or beyond purple passes, or to a foreign land (Murck, 75). Geese migrating to the south, perhaps to the Heng mountains of Hunan or to the sand bars and sandy shores of the lakes and rivers of the Xiaoxiang region of in south and central China. A flock of geese making a landing on level sand is enough of an image to convey both that the geese are flying south and that the season is the fall. Thus, the southern migration of geese often poetically symbolizes the decline associated with the autumn season, including the rise of the forces of yin versus the yang force. (Murck, 75).

=== Other birds ===
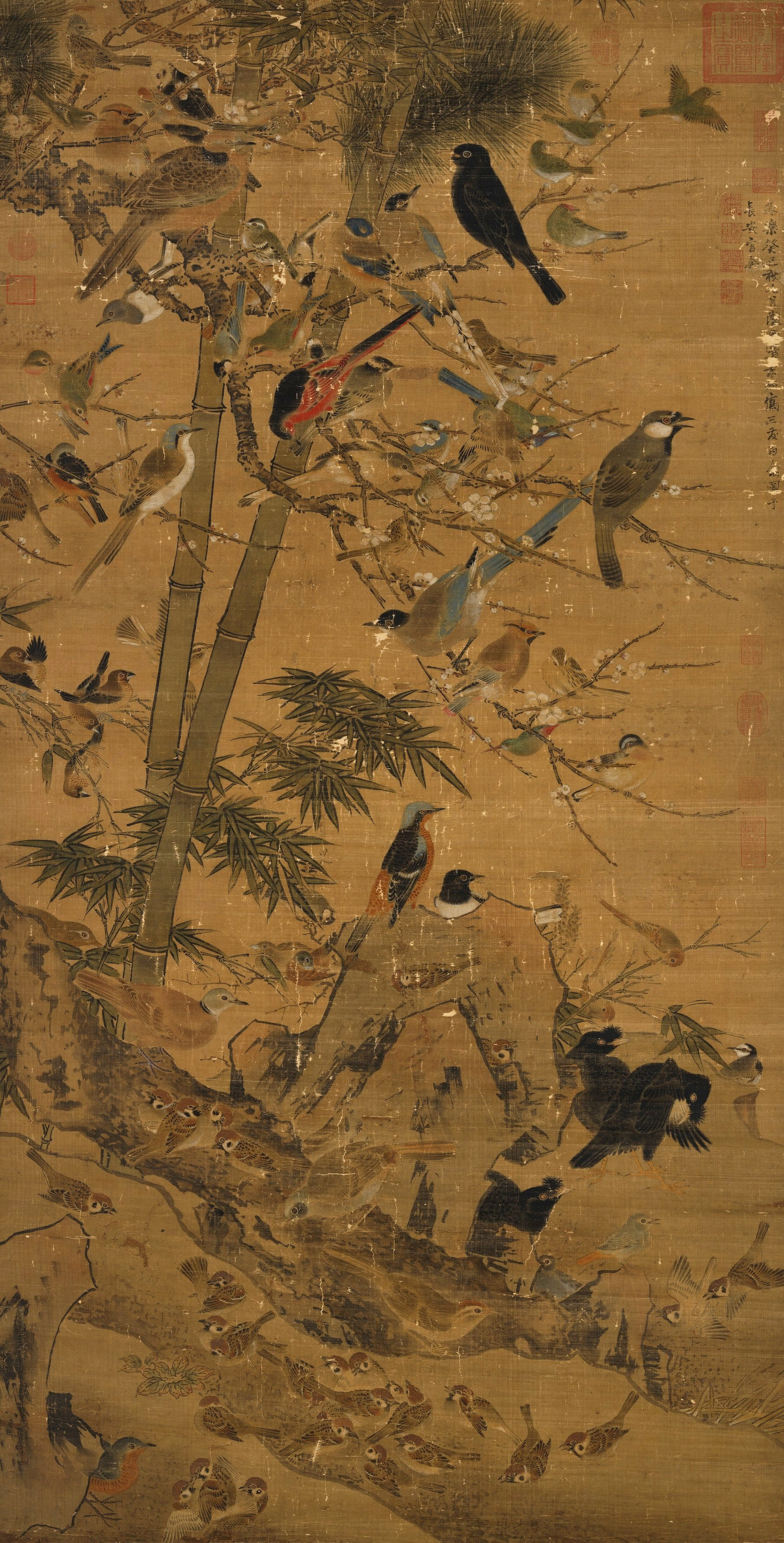
Three Friends and One Hundred Birds, by Bian Jingzhao (Bian Wenjin, active 1426–1435). The "3 friends" are the plum, bamboo, and pine tree shown here.

Other birds besides geese are featured in Chinese poetry. Some are mythological, drawn from the vast realms of Chinese mythology and folklore, though they may share features with geese. Others are birds related to geese, such as swans or ducks. A poetic substitution in the course of an allusion has not been uncommon, especially as a poet's own experience intersects with that of an earlier work. Anne Birrell discusses the role of swans (close relatives of geese) versus other birds in several Han dynastic era ballads, contrasting the role of "owls, pigeons, and sparrows", which are used to portray human foibles, with the role of swans. She discusses "An Old Ballad, Two White Swans" (53-54): "The moral of the verse fable here seems not so much related to individual human behavior as to the behaviour of the individual in so far as he is a member of a group or community." She mentions in this ballad how the pair of swans arrive at the poem's beginning "as part of a flock flying in formation". She goes on to give the moral of the poem as: "Without the flock the individual is nothing; survival depends on social cohesion." Similar poems which substitute geese for swans exist. Another common motif in poetry is the bird as a messenger, bringing news from afar. Examples of messenger birds include the goose, and the Qingniao, "blue bird of happiness".

== Geese in poetry ==
In poetry, geese may symbolize unjust exile (Murck, 74). Geese appear in some of the earliest collections of Chinese poetry, and have continued to reappear, on a regular basis.

=== Shijing geese ===
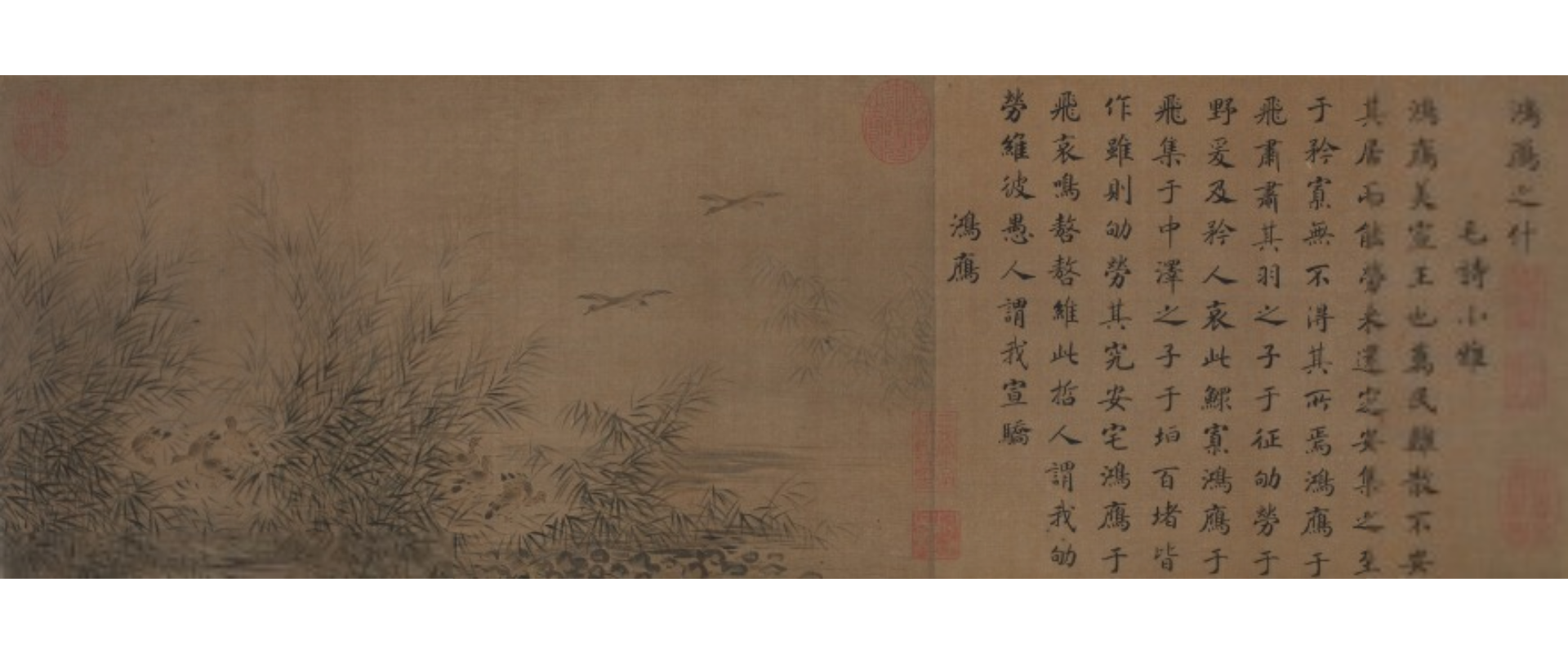
Courtly Odes, Beginning with "Wild Geese", Ma Hezhi (1130–1170). Calligrapher: emperor Gaozong (1107–1187)

The earliest specialized collection Chinese poems is the Shijing, also known as the Book of Odes, Book of Songs, and the Classic of Poetry. Geese are used as allusions in various ways.

==== Social implications ====
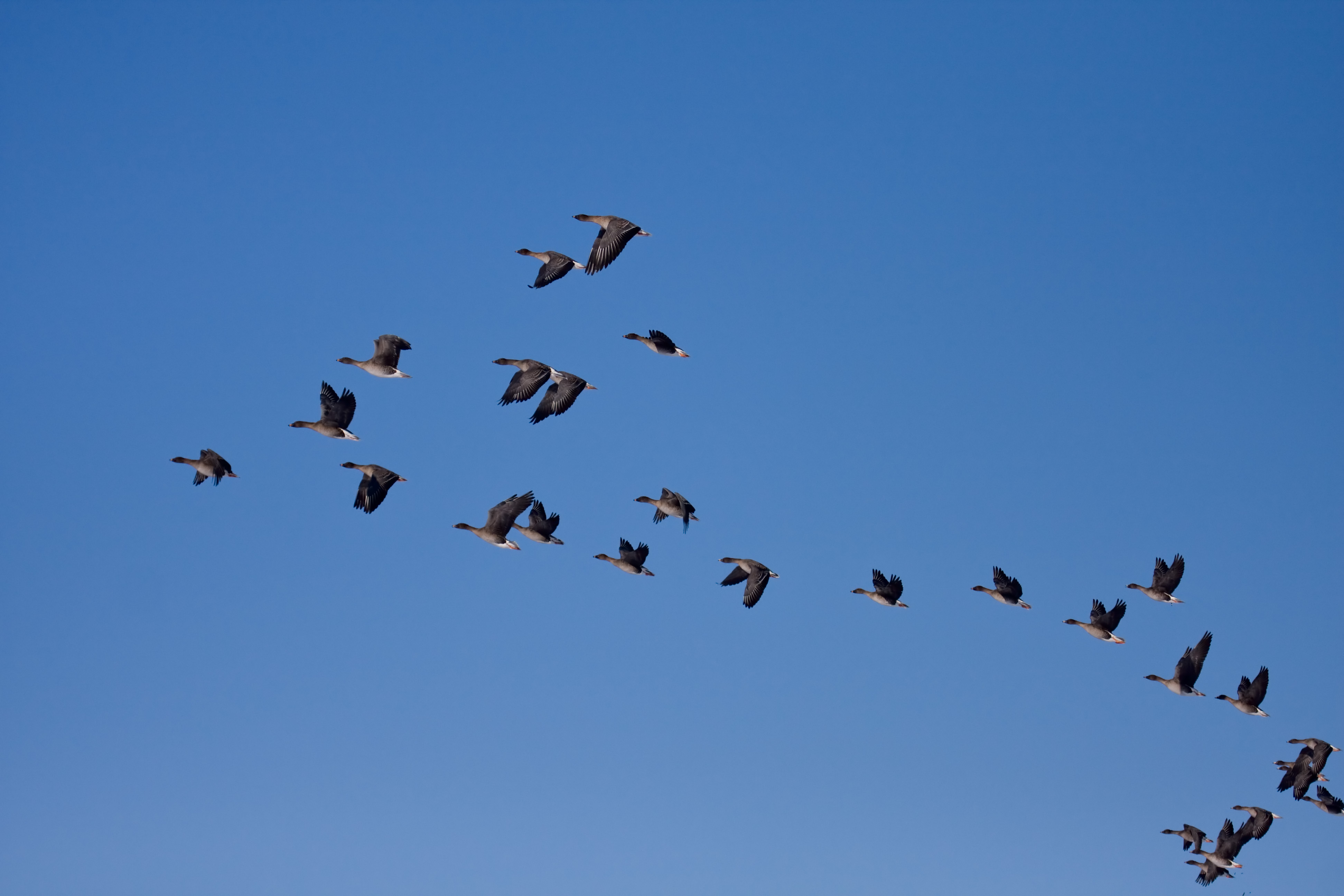
Flock of tundra bean goose, in typical flight organizational pattern. (Genus Anser, species indeterminate)

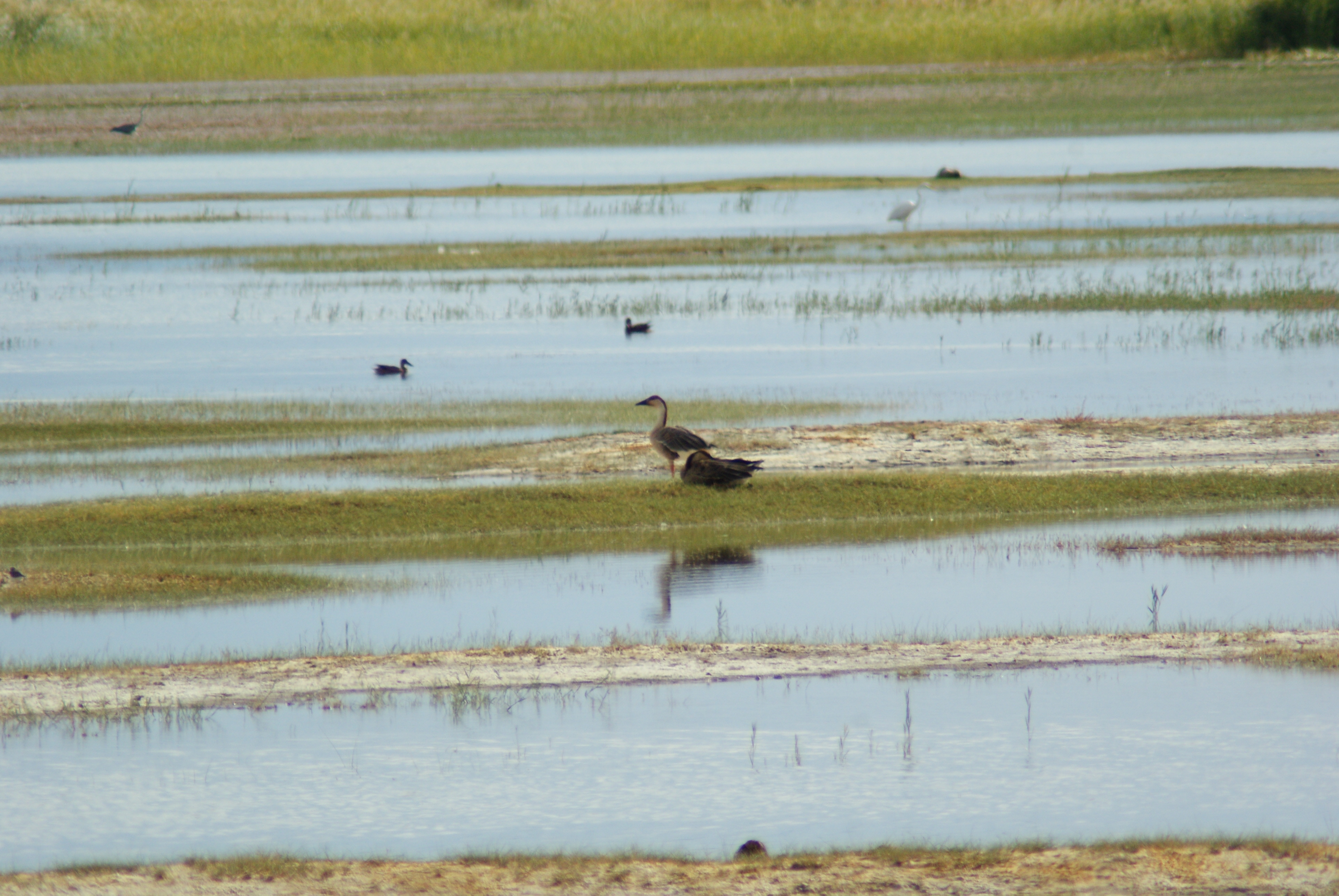
Anser cygnoides, West Mongolia, Khar-Us Lake. 9 September 2009. The couple of large birds in the center are the geese.

One appearance of the Shijing geese is as an allusion for society. In the poem "Wild Geese" ("鴻雁" - "Hong Yan" [小雅 - Lesser Odes, 彤弓之什 - Decade Of Tong Gong]), the geese appear as an allusion to a people wandering with woeful cries, seeking for a home (Murck, 74; and, note 6, 312). Translated by James Legge (1815 – 1897):

The wild geese are flying about;
Su-su goes the rustle of their wings.
[There were] those officers engaged on the commission.
Pained were we and toiled in the open fields;
All were objects of pity,
But alas for those wifeless and widows!

The wild geese are flying about;
And they settle in the midst of the marsh.
[There were] those officers directing the rearing of the walls; -
Five thousand cubits of them arose at once.
Though there was pain and toil,
In the end we had rest in our dwellings.

The wild geese are flying about,
And melancholy is their cry of ao-ao.
There were they, wise men,
Who recognized our pain and toil;
If they had been stupid men,
They would have said we were proclaiming our insolence.

Other translations differ, in certain points, but the general imagery of wild geese, forlornly crying during their quest for a home to rest is clear. Alfreda Murck points out the contrast between the geese here landing in the marsh, and the later Xiaoxiang poetry convention of geese and the level sand (80).

==== Engagement gift ====
The use of the goose for an engagement gift has been noted by Wolfram Eberhard (sub "Goose"): this is attested to in the Shijing ("匏有苦葉" - Pao You Ku Ye [verse 3], 國風 - Airs of the States, 邶風 - Odes of Bei, Legge translation):

The wild goose, with its harmonious notes,
At sunrise, with the earliest dawn,
By the gentleman, who wishes to bring home his bride,
[Is presented] before the ice is melted.

Alfreda Murck notes the striking contrast between the harmonious sounds of the wild geese in this poem with the ineffable sadness expressed elsewhere in the Shijing, such as in particular, in the "Wild Geese" poem (75; and, note 8, 312).

==== Shot down to the ground ====
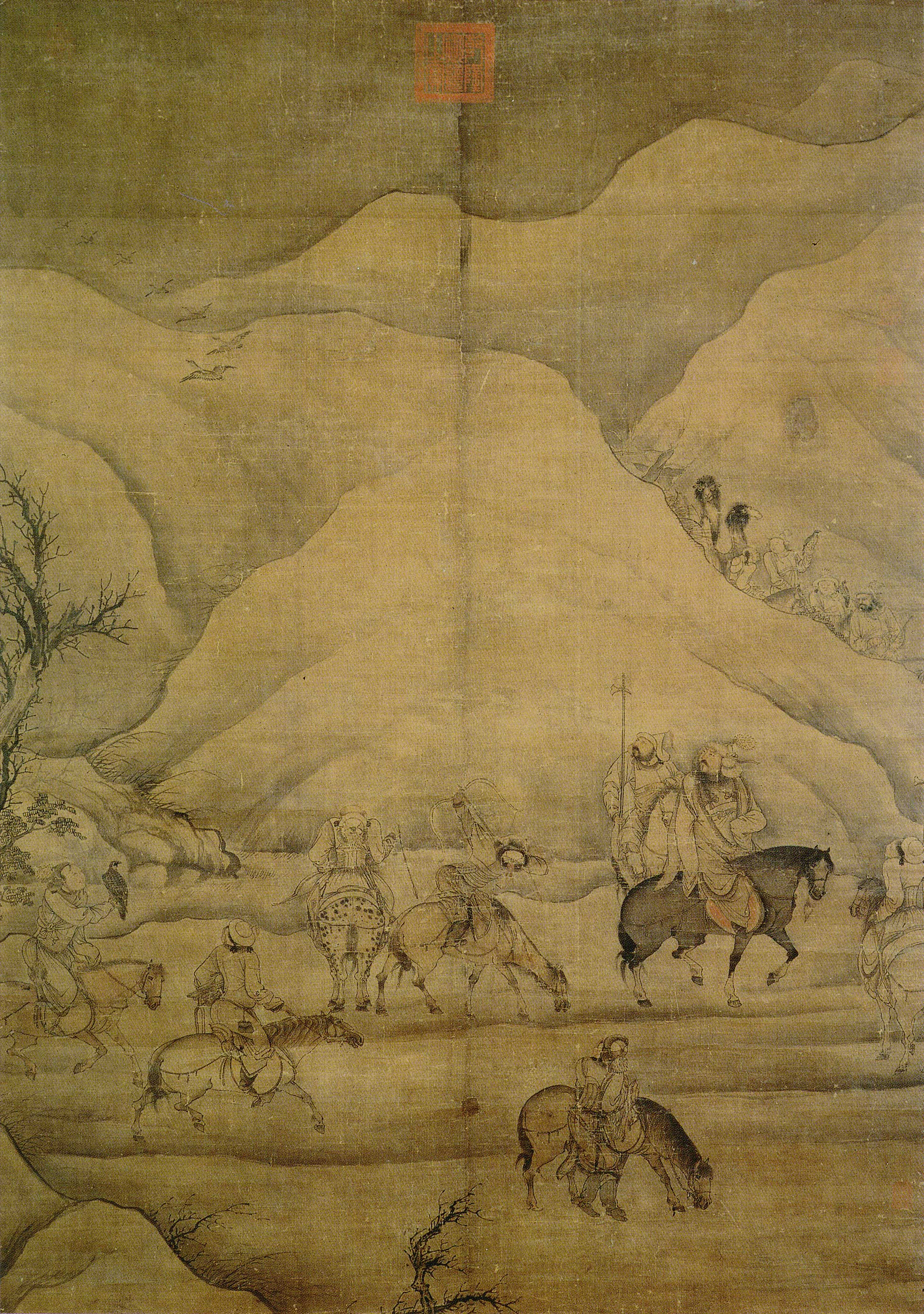
Goosehunt: "Hunting Wild Geese", Yuan dynasty. Fairly advance hunting techniques are depicted, with a variety of animals for mounts, trained birds of prey, and Mongolian-style bows suitable for mounted archery.

Other vivid images of geese in the Shijing involve an archer on the ground, shooting them down with arrows. Poems include "Shu Goes Hunting", an ode to the chariot archer Shu, in which the formation of his chariot horses is compared to that of a flight of geese, ("大叔于田" - "Da Shu Yu Tian", Airs of the States, 鄭 - Zheng), which begins (Legge translation):

Shu has gone hunting,
Mounted in his chariot with four bay horses.
The two insides are the finest possible animals,
And the two outsides follow them regularly as in a flying flock of wild geese.

This is an example of the implication from the orderly flight of wild geese, in which their "habit of flying in a V-shaped wedge was read as a model of order and hierarchy, a concept which applied to both family and court. Brothers were likened to geese flying in close formation, and a man in high office was compared to a goose soaring to heaven" (Murck, 75). In the same section, the poem "女曰雞鳴" - "Nu Yue Ji Ming" (Legge) goes:

Says the wife, ' It is cock-crow; '
' Rise, Sir, and look at the night, - '
If the morning star be not shining.
Bestir yourself, and move about,
To shoot the wild ducks and geese.

Even after marriage, the wife here expects to receive a duck or goose.

=== Chuci geese ===
The other early specialized collection Chinese poems Chuci: not as old of an anthology as is the Shijing, some of the poems of the Chuci rival the poems of the Shijing in age. Geese also inhabit the Chuci.

==== Song Yu's wild geese fly south ====
One of the contributors to the Chuci poetry anthology is considered to be a certain Song Yu, who is acclaimed as the author of the poems in the Nine Changes (Jiǔ biàn); indeed Song Yu is more defined by the existence the poems ascribed to his authorship in the Chuci than any other way, as he is held to be the author of these poems, but nothing else is claimed about him or his life as definitively as this, though other poems have been attributed to his name. Circumstantial evidence indicates that he had some relationship with Qu Yuan as a relative, student, or follower. Alfreda Murck gives Song Yu's half-line "鴈廱廱而南遊兮" in this poem as an early example of the imagery of geese flying south in Chinese poetry (Murck, 75; and, note 10, 112, except Murck gives the variant version of "雁" for "鴈"). David Hawkes (209) translates this line as:

The wild geese call as they travel southwards;

=== Han geese ===
Geese are a major motif in Han dynasty era poetry, including the yuefu of the Music Bureau and the folk (or folk-style) ballads of the Nineteen Old Songs. The story of Han diplomat Su Wu endures in importance.

==== Su Wu ====
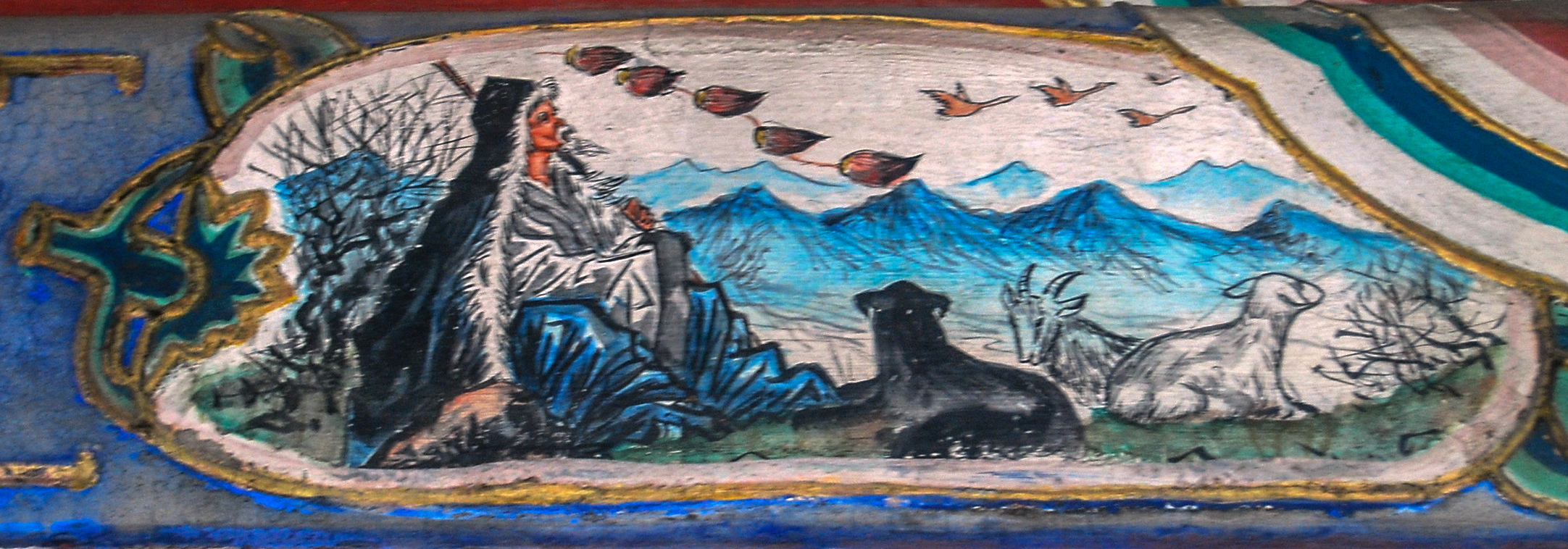
Su Wu in foreign captivity, where he was forced to herd sheep or goats. From the Long Corridor.

===== Mission to Xiongnu =====
Chinese legends of geese include the story of Su Wu: in the days of old, old Su Wu, spent 19 years, captive of Xiongnu. There is a story about Su Wu which became a common allusion in Chinese poetry. Su Wu was an historical figure, however his legend has evolved into the folk realm. There are thus many variations of his story, though much can be attested to historically. The rival Chinese and Xiongnu empires battled in the Han–Xiongnu War from 133 BCE to 89 CE. In 100 BCE, The Chinese emperor, Han Wudi (the "martial emperor of Han") sent his official Su Wu on a mission to Xiongnu (Murck, 75). Su led a diplomatic mission of several official envoys to the Xiongnu ruler, Chedihou, whose official title was Chanyu. The Chinese delegation became embroiled in a plot against the Xiongnu leadership; and, upon the plot's failure, they were all arrested. Some of the Chinese delegates were killed, and Su Wu was put into captivity, where he remained for 19 years.

===== Imprisonment =====
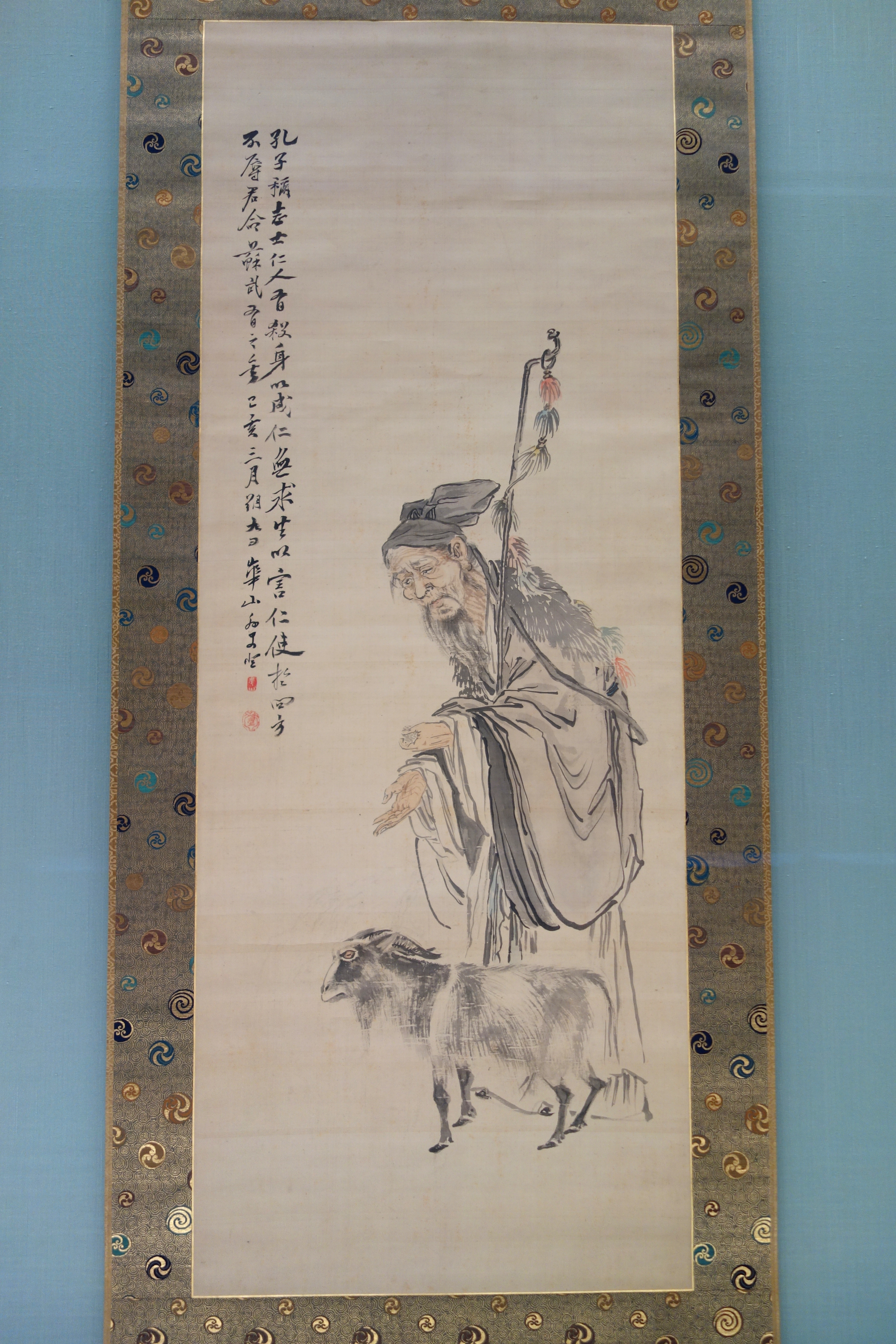
Portrait of Su Wu by Watanabe Kazan (1793-1841), Edo period, dated 1839, showing Su Wu as a herdsman.

Upon his arrest, Su Wu refused to cooperate, and was imprisoned in a cellar. Accounts state that he was provided with neither food nor water, in an effort to elicit his cooperation. Remaining obstinate, Su Wu managed by eating the lining of his coat for food and melting the snow which drifted into his prison for water to drink. Upon his surviving this ordeal, the Xiongnu continued to hold him captive, and attempted to obtain his cooperation. The Xiongnu, rather than truly reporting the state of affairs to the Chinese, instead reported that he had died (Murck, 75); but, he was kept alive, and sent to work as a nomadic herdsperson, in which capacity he is generally supposed to have retained his official staff of office. As the years went by, Su was elevated in status, even it is said given a wife who bore him children. In the meantime, China and Xiongnu continued to conduct mutual hostilities, diplomacy was placed on the back burner, and Su Wu continued to herd the flocks of animals to which duty he was assigned, by the Xiongnu chanyu.

===== Another mission to Xiongnu =====
Various events occurred including a lull in actual combat, and the two sides again turned to diplomacy, in order to reconcile their differences: the Han emperor sending another ambassadorial mission toward the territory in which Su Wu was being held. Presumably in order avoid diplomatic complications, the Xiongnu continued their attempt to conceal the presence of Su Wu. However, according to the historical account, the new Chinese diplomatic mission tricked the chanyu by claiming that the emperor shot down a wild goose with a message from Su Wu tied to its foot (Murck, 75–76). And so, the story goes, the chanyu fell for the bluff, and rather than risk diplomatic embarrassment, Su Wu was released, returning to China in 81 BCE (Murck, 76).

===== Legacy =====
The story of Su Wu is at least part of the origin of the use of the image of a flying goose as a messenger (Alfreda Murck calls it the "locus classicus"), wherein the goose appears carrying a written message tied to its foot (perhaps symbolically) — a letter between two people separated so far seasonally north and south that a migrating goose could indeed be conceived as a plausible mode of communication.

=== Tang geese ===
During the Tang dynastic era geese fly through the verse of the poets, or perhaps resting in the darkness of night on a level, sandy shore. Sometimes, bereft of mate and flock, the lone goose also makes an appearance. Since when the ancient Chu state had had its glory days, the "lakes and rivers region" around and south of Dongting Lake and its tributaries such as the Xiao had been located has long been poetically noted as a place of exile, where even the most talented and loyal government ministers and officials might be slandered at court and relegated to mosquito-infested swamp areas or sent to manage villages of non-Chinese ethnic peoples, in isolation from their intellectual peers and fellow poets. During the Tang dynasty, there were many prominent men of letters who ended up in the Xiaoxiang as a result of political turbulence. One of the "geese" who found himself willy-nilly in the Xiaoxiang was Zhang Yue, Duke of Yan (燕), sometimes known as the "Mighty Brush of Yan", for his literary talents. He was also on-and-off one of the top officials under three reigning monarchs. In and out of favor Zhang Yue was exiled as far as Qinzhou, on the Gulf of Tonkin. In a parallel couplet, in his poem "South of the mountains sending off an official", Zhang explicitly compares and contrasts himself to an autumn goose: but when spring comes he finds himself still stuck south of the mountain ranges which separate him from the capital and the main area of Chinese civilization at the time, while the other geese get to go back north (Murck, 76; and note 17, 313).

==== Du Fu's geese ====
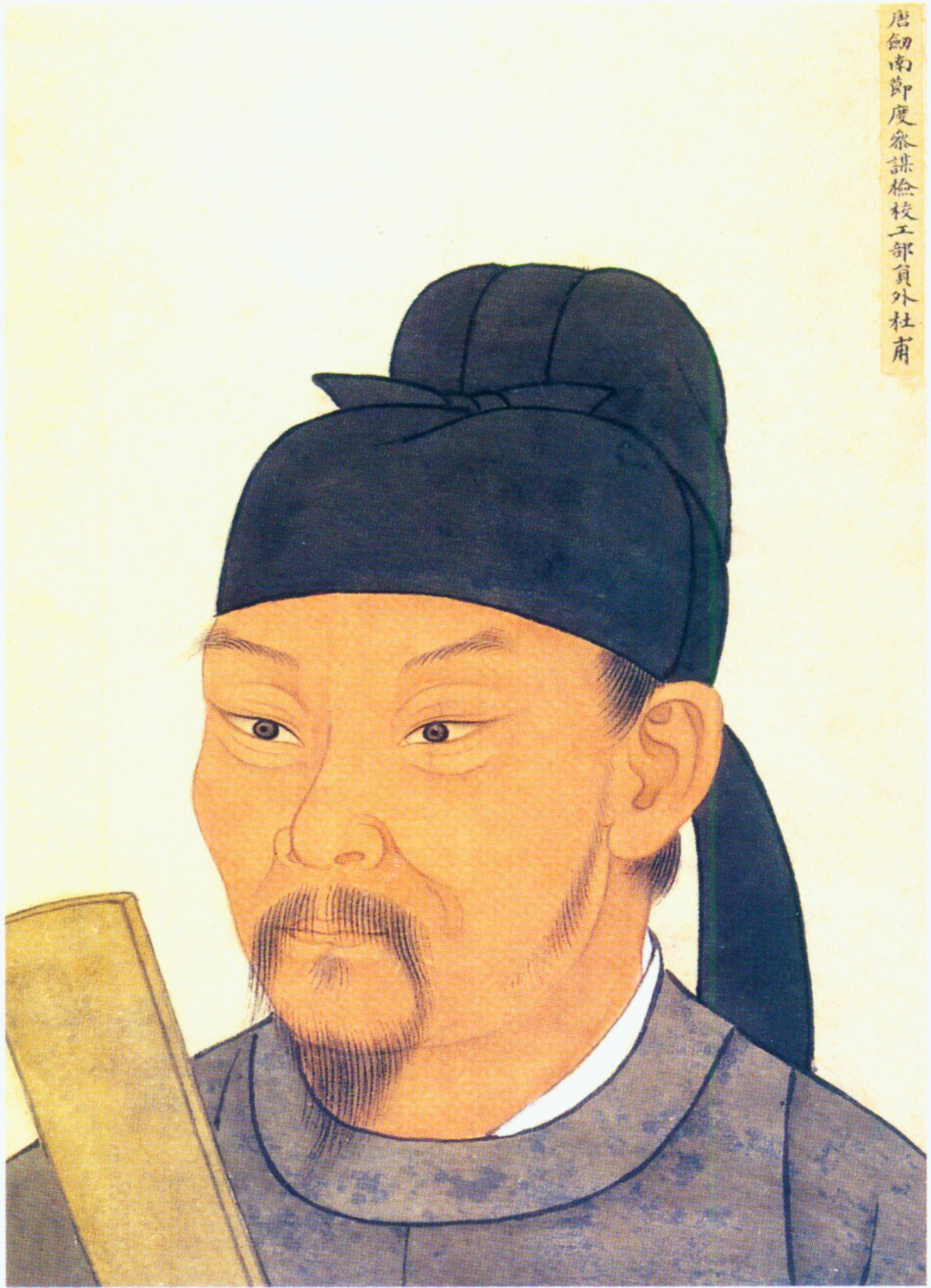
Du Fu, according to an artistic impression.

One of the many poets of the Tang dynastic era (618-907) was Du Fu (712 – 770). Du Fu lived during what has been described as a golden age of poetry. His grandfather was Du Shenyan, government official and poet (one of his poems made it into the 300 Tang poems anthology). His father also had a successful civil service career. Because his father's father, and his father were scholar-officials the road for Du Fu to be the same seemed reasonably smooth. Du Fu encountered a stumbling block in his career path, in 735, when he took and failed the civil service examinations. Then, about 740 his father died; which, at the time, social propriety required a 3-year temporary retirement from public affairs, to take care of various family rituals and affairs. By 755, Du had managed to get an official appointment, one which he would be unable to fulfill. It looked that his prospects had finally overcome whatever hurdles had previously obstructed them: but then, in the final days of 755 the powerful Tang general An Lushan rose in revolt. The same resultant turmoil which ravaged the Tang empire for more than the ensuing decade also decimated Du Fu's career: rebel forces swept across the land. The ravages of war were followed by famine and plague and death. Du Fu not only lost his job before he could start it, but he and his family ended up as refugees in the Xiaoxiang, where he eventually died, but not before writing poems which would secure his place in poetic tradition, many of his most important poems being written in his last several years, in the heart of the Xiaoxiang, where the migrating wild geese came to rest, moult, and prepare for their next journey north. Du Fu was or came to be a great admirer of the wild goose (Murck, 76). The motif of geese grew in intensity in the poetry of Du Fu, as he spent his last years, displaced from his ancestral home area to the ancient land of Chu. Du Fu's poetic imagery of geese turned out to be portable, and was adopted by such poets, as the Song dynasty's Su Shi.

=== Song geese ===
The poetry of the Song dynastic era was inhabited by flocks of geese: geese continue to fly in the verse of the poets, or perhaps to descend to the level, sandy shore in the glow of evening for a place to rest for the night. Sometimes the solitary goose continues its lonely flight.

==== Su Shi's geese ====
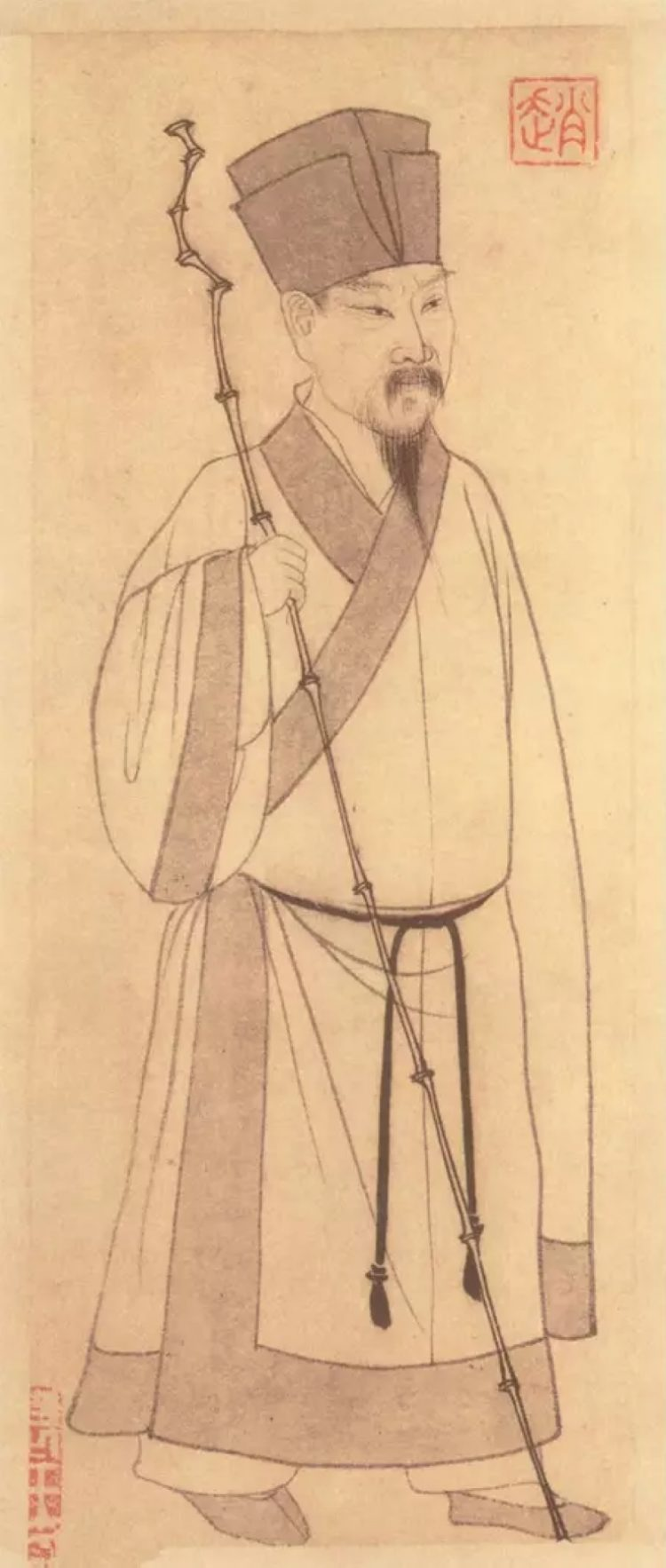
An early Yuan dynasty portrait of Su Shi, by Zhao Mengfu 趙孟頫.

Su Shi (1037 – 1101), sometimes known as Dongpo, was another poet-scholar-official who followed the goose-path into exile. The song of his poetry has continued beyond the demise of the Song dynasty (960–1279). Although Su Shi Dongpo himself never made it back alive from his final exile, in Hainan. Factional party politics were the order of the day, and when Su's party was out of favor, he tended to be exiled to some remote location. At one point he was even put on trial on charges of lèse-majesté, or treasonous statements toward the emperor himself, which he had either written himself in his poetry, or that had been written by others and was accused of allowing to be circulated without his reporting their existence to the authorities. This trial was known as the "Crow Terrace Poetry Case", and involved Su Shi together with numerous "co-conspirators", including Wang Shen (Murck, 126). In court, in what must have been quite embarrassing for his political opponents, Su Shi made a confession explaining how his poems were derogatory to his political enemies, in most explicit detail, but pointing out that he was not guilty because he had said nothing and allowed nothing that was directly demeaning of the emperor or the state itself, and that the verses in question merely and legitimately mocked officials who in fairness deserved to have their deficiencies as public servants made public. But such victories were partial and temporary. Su Shi spent time in banishment in Hubei (where he took on the name Dongpo) and later, after a recall to honor and office, again banished to Huizhou and then to the south sea island of Hainan (although recalled again, he died on the way back). Although Hainan is not exactly in the Xiaoxiang region geographically, in order to get to and from southern Huizhou and Hainan and to get to and from the capital city of Kaifeng in the north or other similar positions, prolonged travel through the Xiaoxiang was on the itinerary.

== Geese as an artistic motif ==
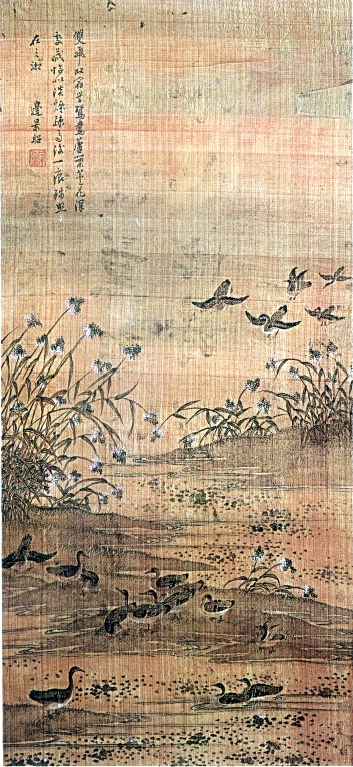
Bian Wenjin, Wild geese in the waters of San Xiang, early 15th century.

Pictorial and poetic depiction often come together with calligraphy in Chinese tradition, with artworks often combining painting or drawing together with the brushed calligraphy of a poem's (or poems') characters into one piece. Sometimes, as in the Xiaoxiang tradition during the Tang and Song dynastic eras, when the Xiaoxiang region in south-central China was a common destination to which exiled officials were consigned, some of them utilized this as an opportunity to write poetry.

=== Eight Views of Xiaoxiang ===
The Eight Views of Xiaoxiang is not a specific work nor collection; rather, it is its own genre, existing both poetically and pictorially. Alfreda Murck (71) gives the following list of the Eight Views of Xiaoxiang:

| English Translation of Title | Original Chinese Title |
|---|---|
| Geese Descending to Level Sand | 平沙雁落 |
| Sail Returning from Distant Shore | 遠浦帆歸 |
| Mountain Market, Clearing Mist | 山市晴嵐 |
| River and Sky, Evening Snow | 江天暮雪 |
| Autumn Moon over Dongting lake | 洞庭秋月 |
| Night Rain on the Xiao Xiang | 瀟湘夜雨 |
| Evening Bell from Mist-Shrouded Temple | 煙寺晚鍾 |
| Fishing Village in Evening Glow | 漁村夕照 |

Notably, the first of the list is Geese Descending to Level Sand, a genre which hinges upon the motif of exile. And if, by metaphor, the poet is a goose, stranded on a southern sandbar; then, the "descent" into exile begins with the poet/goose's arrival in the Xiaoxiang. Murck points out (71) that looking at the list holistically that it makes a form of regulated verse.

== See also ==
- Anatidae, biological family of which geese are a part. Also includes ducks and swans
- Anserinae, biological subfamily of Anatidae which includes true geese and swans
- Chinese goose
- Domestic goose
- Dongting Lake
- Eight Views of Xiaoxiang, series including "Geese Descending on Level Sand"
- Feast at Hong Gate, an article mentioning the "Goose Gate" of Xianyang
- Goose
- Su Wu, Han dynastic era explorer-diplomat who was held in captivity 19 years to the north of China.
