= Autumn Day in Kui Prefecture =

Name of poem
- Traditional Chinese: "秋日夔府詠懷奉寄鄭監李賓客一百韻"
- Simplified Chinese: "秋日夔府咏怀奉寄郑监李宾客一百韵"
- Literal meaning: "Autumn Day in Kui Prefecture, A Song Submitted to Supervisor Zheng and Advisor Li, in One Hundred Rhymes" (Alfreda Murck translation)

Name of author
- Chinese: 杜甫
- Hanyu Pinyin: Dù Fǔ
- Wade–Giles: Tu Fu (Tu⁴ Fu³)

"Autumn Day in Kui Prefecture" is a poem by 8th-century Chinese poet Du Fu (712–770). The full title of this poem is Autumn Day in Kui Prefecture, A Song Submitted to Supervisor Zheng and Advisor Li, in One Hundred Rhymes (according to title translation by Alfreda Murck). As a poem, "Autumn Day in Kui Prefecture" is an example of Tang poetry, which received considerable attention during the Song dynasty, in Song poetry, and later, even through modern times. During the Song dynasty Du Fu's "Autumn Day in Kui Prefecture" received particular attention, with the poem being subtly alluded to through rhyme-scheme referencing by Su Shi and his circle: in other words, Su Shi and the poets of his circle wrote poems which utilized the same rhyming words from Du Fu's poem, thus subtly referencing the sense and sentiment of Du Fu's line, but without overtly stating what might be censured as inappropriate. This allowed him and others to express opinions about government and society, without suffering the consequences, as Su Shi had previously done, in the Crow Terrace Poetry Trial, when his poetry was used as evidence resulting in his conviction and exile.

== Literary source(s) ==
Du Fu's poem "Autumn Day in Kui Prefecture" can be found in scroll 230 of the Complete Tang Poems.

== Background ==
=== Geography ===
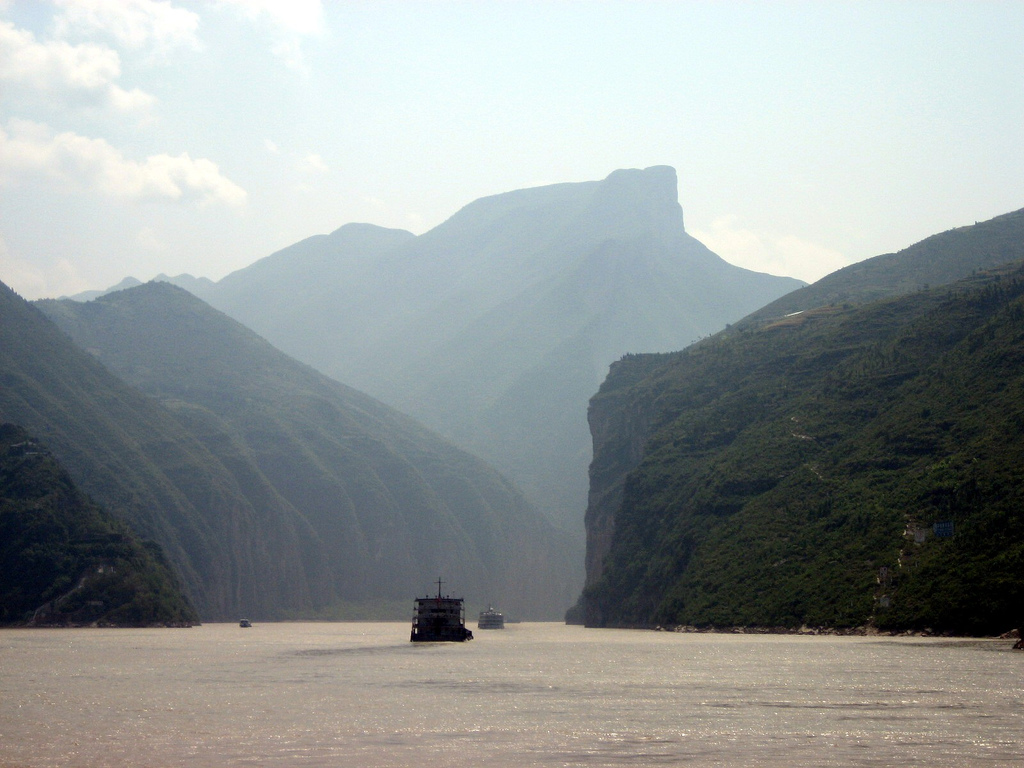
Kuimen (夔門/夔门): the "Gateway of Kuizhou", Qutang Gorge (formerly Kui Gorge, or 夔峡, Kuixia), along the Yangzi River.

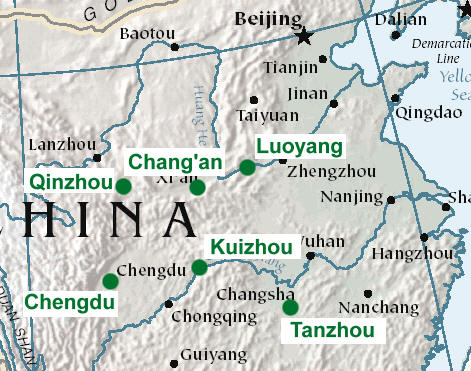
Map showing approximate location of Kuizhou, along the Yangzi River, during the Tang dynasty of China. "China" appears as "hina".

Kui Prefecture is also known as "Kuizhou Circuit" and "Kuizhou" (Chinese: 夔州; pinyin: Kuízhōu; Wade–Giles: K'uei-chou), or just "Kui": this politically-organized geographic entity was initially established in 619 CE, and was an important area from the beginning and through the end of the Tang dynasty of China, when it was alternatively part of several of the Circuits which made up Tang dynastic era large scale political structural organizations. Kui Prefecture was located in what is now eastern Chongqing. Part of the historic importance of Kuizhou is related to its location on the Yangzi River. Kuizhou (Kui Prefecture) was located in the Three Gorges area of the Yangzi River, a main transportation east-west corridor through China, which made use of the Yangzi River for transportation by water. Kui was also known for spectacular scenery, and being a location in which exiled poets wrote their laments: it has been considered part of the Xiaoxiang.

=== History ===
Kui Prefecture (Kuizhou) was an area typical of many areas which were part of the southern Tang Empire that experienced an increase in population and development as a result of the disasters beginning with and following the An Lushan rebellion (also known as the Anshi disturbances). Later, toward the end of the Tang Dynasty this area which was formerly a refuge became itself the center of military activity leading to the breakup of the Tang imperial dynasty and the development of the independent states of the Five Dynasties and Ten Kingdoms period. The Kuizhou area was held by the Han dynasty: during this time, it was known as "Baidi", or "White Emperor", in English, and later Chinese poetry has used this as a metonymn.

=== Xiaoxiang poetry ===
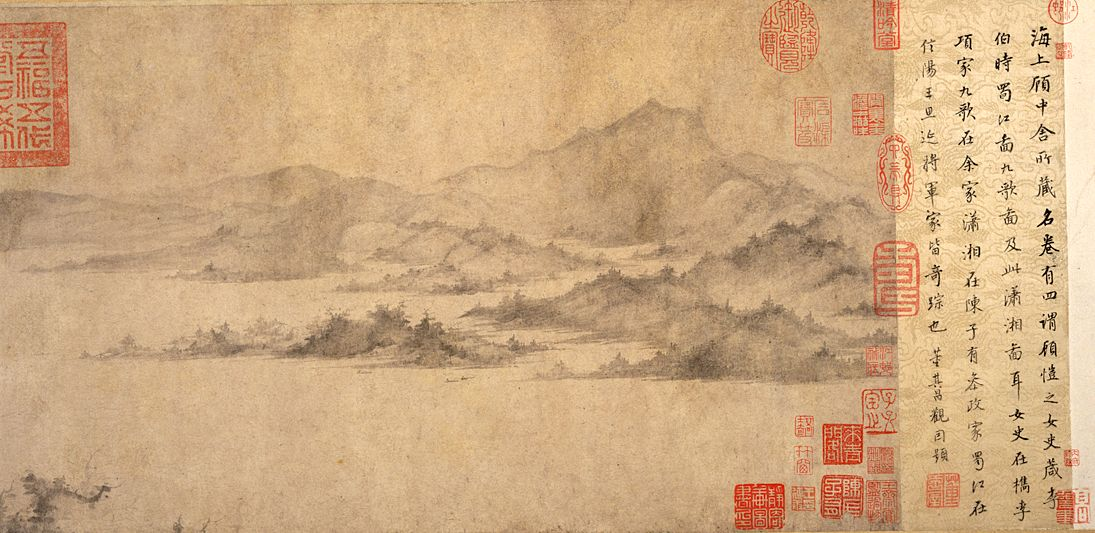
Imaginary tour through Xiao-xiang. Song dynasty painting.

Xiaoxiang poetry is one of the Classical Chinese poetry genres, one practiced for over a thousand years. It is a poetry of scenic wonders, a poetry of officials exiled for their views and beliefs, and a poetry of dissent against submitting to government control. Xiaoxiang poetry is geographically associated with the Xiaoxiang region, around and south of Dongting Lake, including Kuizhou. The Xiaoxiang genre of literature is often associated with similarly themed Chinese calligraphy and Chinese painting. Famous poets in this genre include Du Fu, and the main theme of this type of poetry is more-or-less that of the government official who has been exiled and sent to some peerlessly remote area, such as the Xiaoxiang.

=== Du Fu ===
Du Fu
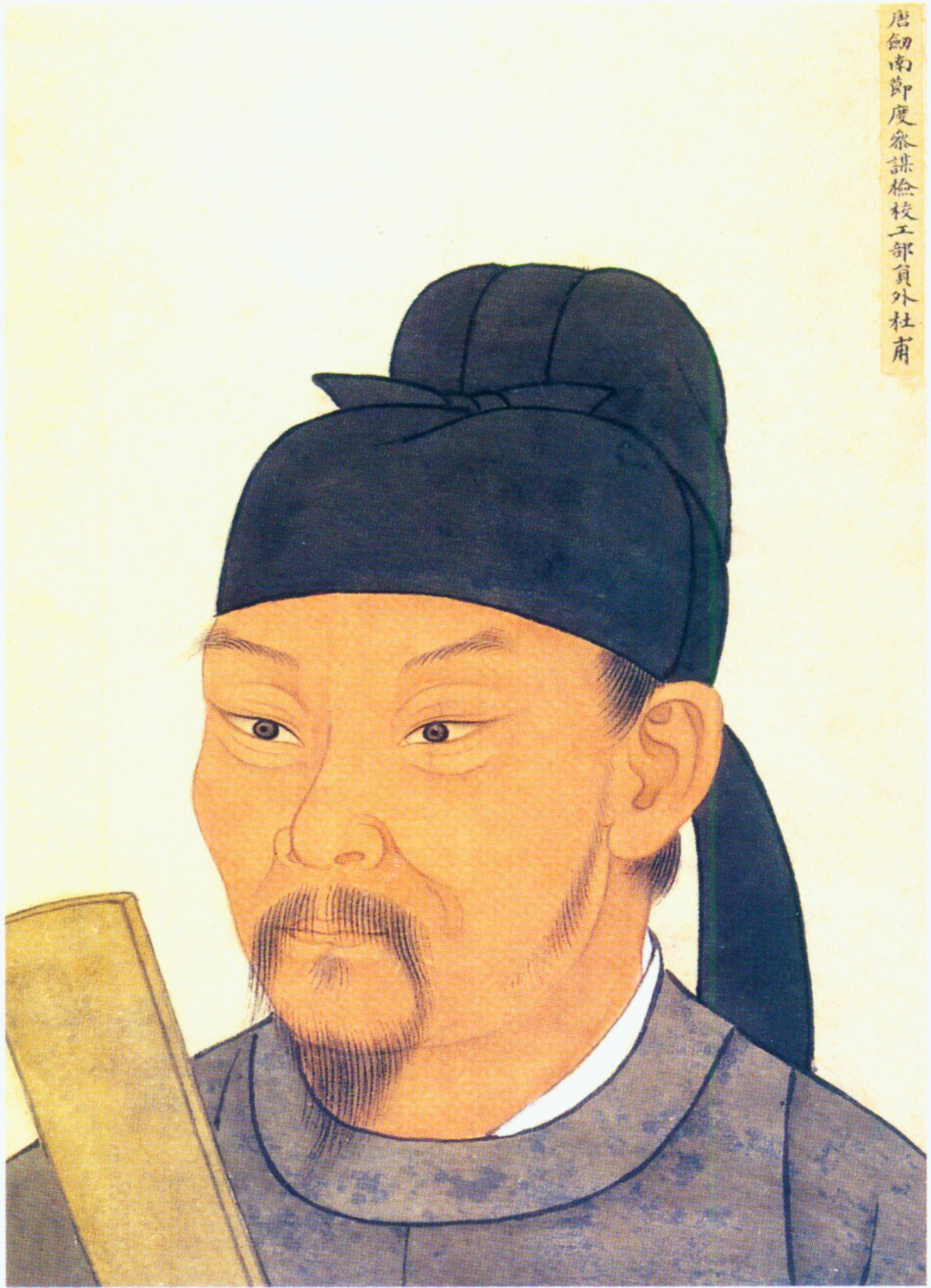
- There are no contemporaneous portraits of Du Fu; this is a later artist's impression.
- Born: 712
- Died: 770 (aged 57–58)
- Occupation: Poet

The author of "Autumn Day in Kui Prefecture" is Du Fu (Chinese: 杜甫; pinyin: Dù Fǔ; 712 – 770), one of the most prominent poets of the Tang poetry practitioners. Much or most of what is known of Du Fu's life comes from his poems. His paternal grandfather was Du Shenyan, a noted politician and poet during the reign of empress Wu. The An Lushan rebellion began in December 755, and was not completely suppressed for almost eight years, and ended the "golden age" of the Tang dynasty. It caused enormous disruption to Chinese society, and loss of millions of human population. Du Fu was displaced from his homeland in the north, and at one point ended up in Kuizhou, where he is presumed to have written "Autumn Day in Kui Prefecture".

== Poem ==
"Autumn Day in Kui Prefecture" consists of 200 lines of 100 rhymed couplets (Murck, passim). It is called "one-hundred rhymes" because the rhyme is at the end of the couplet.

== Song dynastic era follow-up ==
During the Song dynasty Du Fu's "Autumn Day in Kui Prefecture" received particular attention, with the poem being subtly alluded to through rhyme-scheme referencing by Su Shi and his circle. This allowed him and others to express opinions about government and society, without suffering the consequences, as Su Shi did in the Crow Terrace Poetry Trial.

== See also ==
- Classical Chinese poetry
- Crow Terrace Poetry Trial
- Du Fu
- Kui Prefecture
- Song poetry
- Su Shi
- Tang poetry
- Wang Shen
