= Crow Terrace Poetry Trial =

Treason trial against Su Shi and others, in 1079

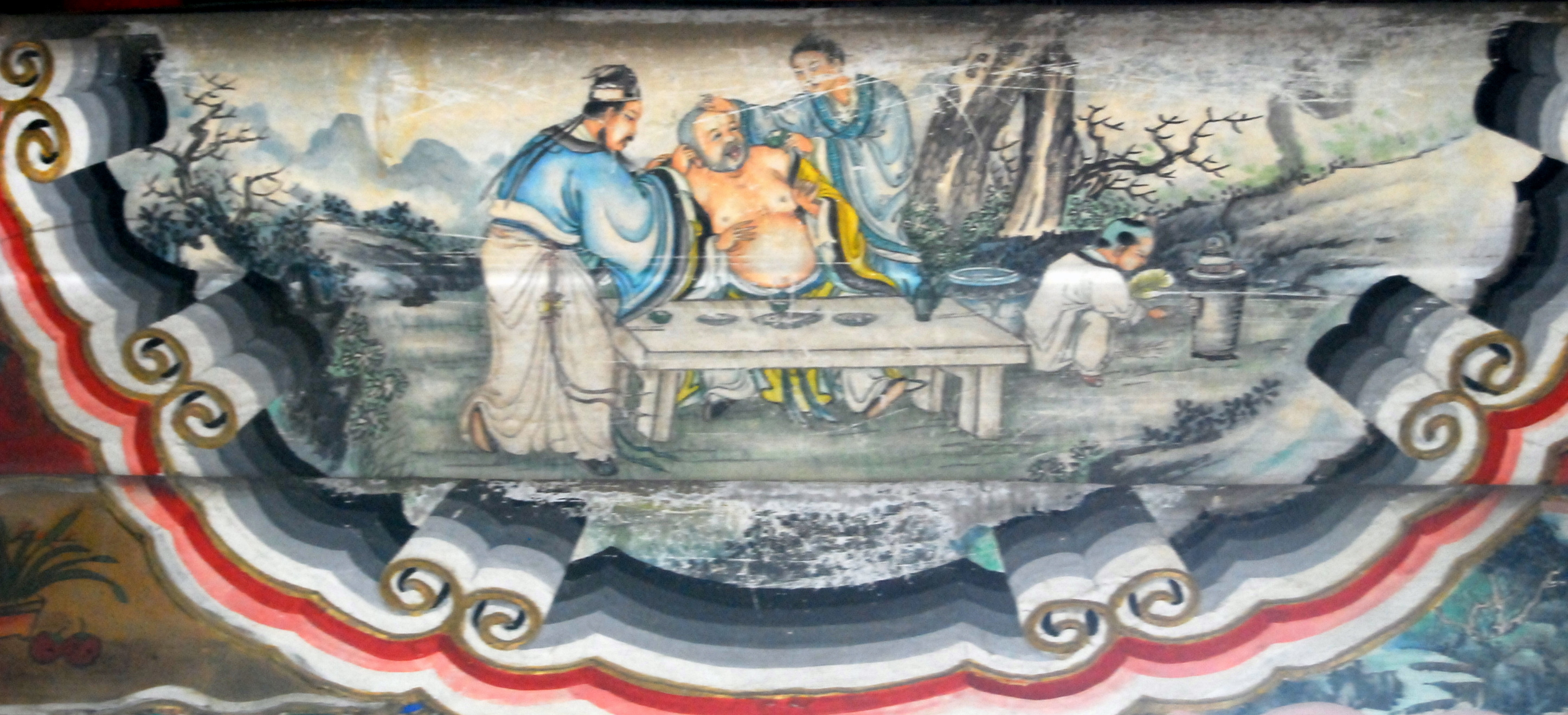
Illustration from the Long Corridor. left to right: Su Shi, Fo Yin (佛印), and Huang Tingjian, drinking wine.

The Crow Terrace Poetry Trial (or Crow Terrace Poetry Case, 烏臺詩案) was a trial on charges including treason and lèse majesté that occurred in the year 1079 of Song dynasty era in Chinese history. The legal action conducted against Su Shi by government prosecutors has abiding interest in the case of government censorship versus artistic freedom. "Crow Terrace" designates the nickname for the Imperial Office of the Censorate (御史臺), the office which prosecuted the case, citing Song Criminal Code, Article 122: "Denouncing the Imperial Chariot". The Imperial Censorate accused dozens of defendants. The most prominent of the dozens accused was the official, artist, and poet Su Shi (1037 – 1101), whose works of poetry were produced in court as evidence against him.

The trial was a major landmark in the struggle for free speech in medieval China. The trial resulted in Su Shi's conviction and exile, as well as the conviction of over thirty other individuals, who faced varying punishments including fines and official reprimands. The Crow Terrace Poetry Trial had the significant effect of dampening subsequent creative expression and set a major negative precedent for freedom of speech, at least for the remainder of Song Dynasty China. Besides the significance of the Crow Terrace Poetry Trial for Su Shi and poetry, it is also a rather remarkably well-documented instance of a medieval Chinese literary prosecution, with surviving copies of indictments, arguments, case disposition, and also numerous poems by Su Shi which had been entered as evidence.

== General background ==
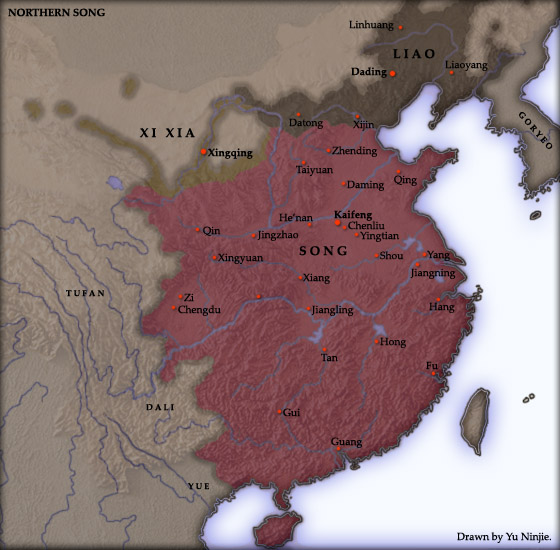
Approximate map of Northern Sung China (960–1127), with neighboring empires indicated.

The Crow Terrace Poetry Trial took place in 1079, the 2nd year of the Yuanfeng era (Yuán Fēng 元豐; "Primary Abundance") 1078–1085 of the Song dynasty. The disparate states of the Five Dynasties and Ten Kingdoms period had been unified by the first Song ancestor, Zhao Kuangyin (Emperor Taizu of Song); and, the capital city established in Kaifeng. The Crow Terrace Affair occurred during the reign of Emperor Shenzong of Song, who was then emperor: he was born in 1048 and reigned from 1067 to 1085.

== Poetic background ==
As Alfreda Murck puts it: "Poetry pervaded the lives of educated scholars in the Song dynasty". The poetic legacy was greatly derived from poetry of the Tang dynastic era. Especially important was the work of the Tang poet Du Fu. Du Fu (712 – 770) caused a revival of interest in poetry during the Song dynastic era. One of Du Fu's poems was "Autumn Day in Kui Prefecture": written in and about the exile experience in Kui Prefecture.

== Su Shi's early life ==
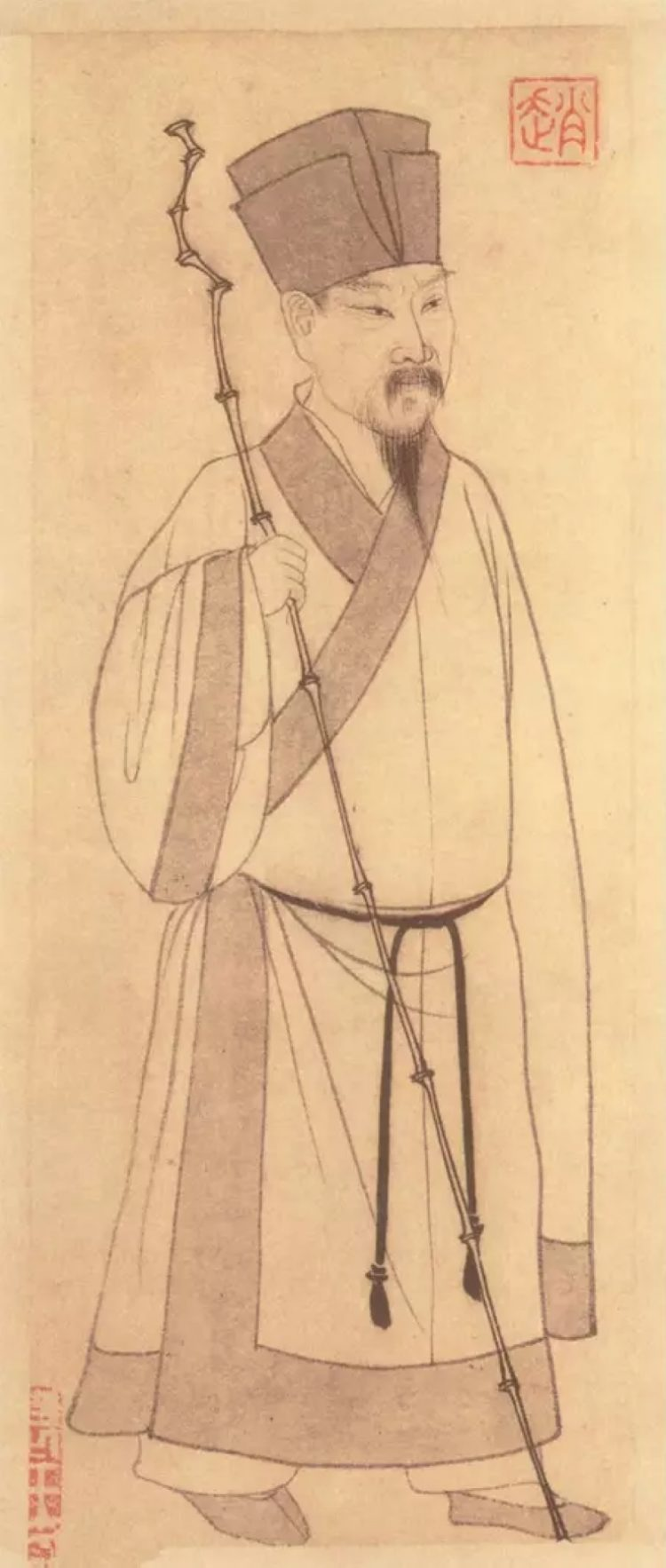
An early Yuan Dynasty portrait of Su Shi, by Zhao Mengfu 趙孟頫, held at the National Palace Museum in Taipei.

Su Shi was a prominent and popular poet, as well as being deeply involved in the factional politics of the time. Su Shi's career began with particular promise. His father, Su Xun, was a known scholar-official and his brother, Su Zhe, followed. The brothers passed the imperial civil service tests in 1057 with honors (followed up in 1061 with specially-decreed examinations). Thus, Su Shi came to the attention of emperor Renzong, who reigned from 1022 to 1063. Not only that, but Su Shi obtained the patronage of prominent government official and renowned poet Ouyang Xiu. When Renzong died in 1063, he was replaced by Yingzong, who ruled for 4 years till his death. The new emperor was the 19-year-old Shenzong, who was eager for a full treasury to fund his ambitions of re-conquest of the former Tang empire's northern territories, which had been incorporated into neighboring, non-Chinese empires.

== Wang Anshi's New Policies: initial implementation ==
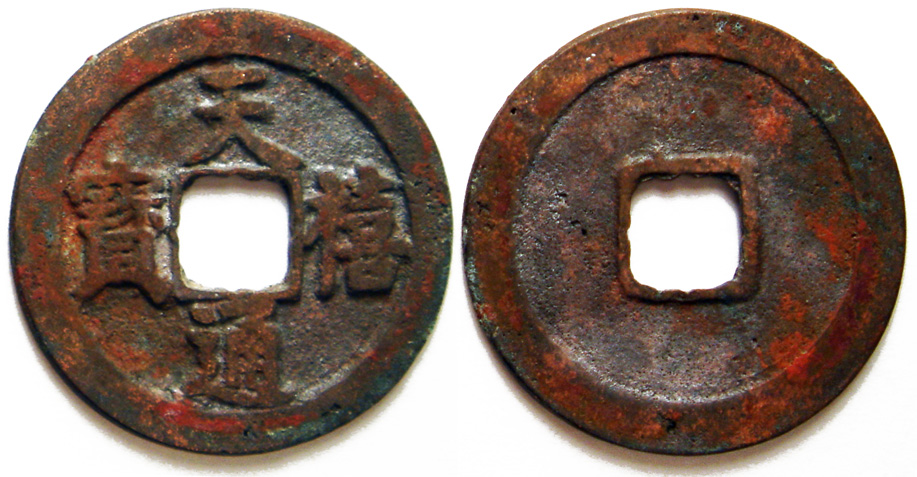
Much of Wang Anshi's New Policies had to do with fiscal issues. Shenzong's support of them had much to do with the aspiration to expand the imperial sway beyond the current borders. For this, much cash would need to be forthcoming. Pictured here is the obverse and reverse of a Tian Xi Tong Bao (1017–1022) coin, typical for much of Chinese history. The holes could be used to string coins together into convenient groups. Song dynasty monetary policies also included experimentation with paper notes.

Although theoretically, the emperor was the final and absolute authority in Chinese politics during the Song dynasty, in actuality many factors importantly affected events: these included other politically influential persons such as the emperor's in-laws and other relatives and also party politics. Party political division at the time was severe: Wang Anshi led a group of "reformists", also known as the "New Policy party", whose ideas were perhaps ahead of their time. Su Shi was part of the politically opposed "conservative" group, later known as the "Yuanyou party", after the era-name during which they had exercised most power. Wang Anshi's New Policies had their ups-and-downs in imperial favor, but initially he was able to sweep the political field of oppositional voices. Sima Guang, the main oppositional leader retired to Luoyang, as did various others in his faction. Su Shi's patron Ouyang Xiu (1007 – 1072) was demoted, exiled, and eventually permitted to retire. Su Shi was not identified as a main leader of the opposition party and was exiled as governor of Hangzhou, which in itself was not the worst place to be sent, or the worst position for someone pursuing a career in politics, but it forbade his appearance at court, and consequentially denied him direct influence or interaction with the imperial government, at the national level.

== Hangzhou: life and poetry in exile ==
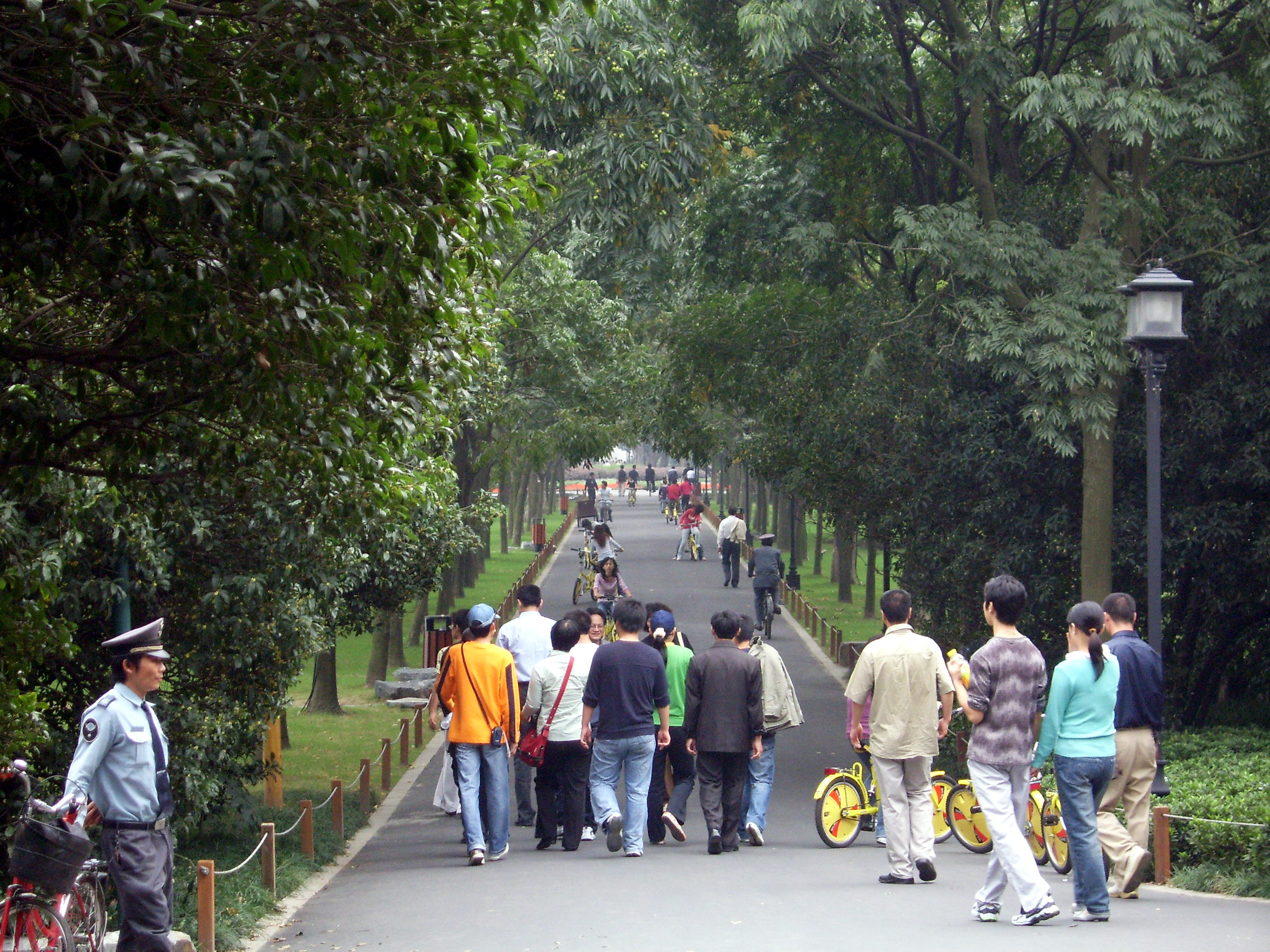
Su Shi caused a causeway to be created across West Lake. This is a view of it from 2005.

Su Shi's political vulnerability had been increased by a prior conviction, which resulted in his first sentence to exile, before the Crow Terrace incident. His first exile was relatively mild: it was as governor of Hangzhou, on beautiful West Lake, where the poet Bai Juyi had previously governed, a city which would later become the capital of the Song dynasty after the fall of Kaifeng to invasion (much after Su Shi's lifetime). Su Shi obtained a small farm-hold, here, which he worked while fulfilling his service as a local official. As governor of Hangzhou, Su Shi employed more than 200,000 workers in environmental works to dredge mud and sediment out of West Lake, thus preserving it from silting up and no longer being a lake, as it was in danger of doing so. The dredged material was used to build a causeway (just as the poet Bai Juyi had done similarly, in similar circumstance, back in the Tang dynasty era). Su Shi's works helped endear him to the local population. An anthology of Su Shi's poetry from his Hangzhou era came into circulation, collected and published by his friends. David Hinton describes this first exile in Hangzhou as the time when he "consolidated his mature poetics".

== New Policy: continuation without Wang Anshi ==
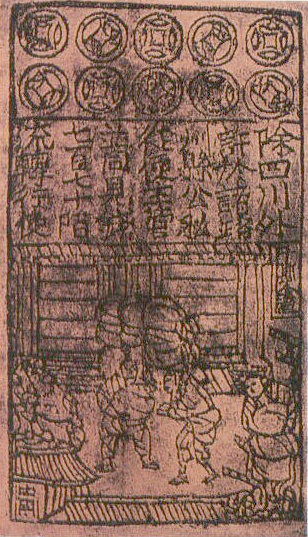
Among the fiscal novelties of the Song dynasty was their use of paper money. This is a specimen.

While Su Shi concentrated on making the lives of the local people in his charge better, and pursued his poetry which his position allowed time for, Wang Anshi's policies went awry. Were they bad policies, or were they badly implemented, or were climatic changes leading to drought and poor harvests to blame? These are all serious questions, important to historians of the time, and nowhere near to being definitively answered; but, they are rather subject of great scholarly debate. What is certain is that Su Shi was exiled until emperor Shenzong became somewhat disillusioned with Wang Anshi (the powerful empress dowager had never been much of a fan of his). The Kaifeng merchants were becoming angry at the price inflation of wholesale goods together with additional tax increases and imposition of fees; and in north of the country a major drought followed by horrible famine occurred in 1074, displacing thousands of refugees. In late 1075, this was followed by a spectacular comet, traditionally viewed as a sign of great changes on earth, if not portending the fall of dynasties. These events helped to lead Wang Anshi into a relatively gentle exile, and to lead to the restoration of Su Shi and other banished officials to positions of power and respect, aided by empress dowager Cao. However, this was just the warm-up to a bitter and deadly political struggle between the two factions in the ensuing years: now both groups had had their ranks decimated, and all sorts of charges of criminal impropriety were our would be filed. Ouyang Xiu had even already been charged with incest, and placed in early retirement: the battle lines drawn, and Su Shi would soon be charged with treason to the state.

== End of exile ==
Su Shi was no longer in formal exile, but he avoided returning to the court in Kaifeng. His persecutor Wang Anshi had been removed from there. And, Su Shi had the support of Renzong's widow, who recalled his stellar performance in the examinations. However, despite recall and promotion, in the field of bitter factional politics, this made Su Shi a target for whatever charges could be invented or discovered. However, avoiding the harsh scrutiny in Kaifeng would not guarantee safety.

== Accusation and arrest ==
Su Shi's poetry was not only popular with the literate set: his poems were even sung in the streets. This came to official attention. In the summer of 1079, Su Shi was arrested and spent the next 4 months in jail, in Kaifeng, during his trial. He was also beaten. When his family packed up their goods and followed him to Kaifeng, they were brutally seized and searched by soldiers sent to stop their boat and search for incriminating manuscripts: as a result the women of the family burned most of Su Shi's writings that the soldiers did not take away. Fearing that any of his writings could be used against him, Su Shi's wife burned his papers on the deck. Despite this, some 2,400 of his poems yet survive.

== Other conspirators ==
Another major figure indicted in this case was Wang Shen, a wealthy noble and imperial in-law, who was also a painter, poet, and friend of Su Shi. Wang was particularly accused of having caused a collected edition of Su Shi's allegedly subversive poems to be printed and published. Another person involved in the case was Huang Tingjian. Huang and his uncle were heavily fined, and Huang was exiled. Another person implicated in the events was Su Shi's brother Su Zhe. There were in total more than 30 indictments in the case.

== Prosecution ==
Prosecution was by the Office of the Censor (censorate, or "Crow Terrace"). This office, under a head official was charged with investigating and prosecuting the other officials within the imperial bureaucracy. Lead prosecutors in the case (non-pinyin) were Li Ting and Shu Tan, early supporters of Wang Anshi and New Policy party members: Li Ting had been appointed chief of the censorate in 1078. Su Shi's case involved an initial indictment, out of an eventual total of four separate indictments.

== Evidence ==
The main evidence used by the prosecution in the trial were over thirty years of poetry and prose written by Su Shi. This was collected from many of his associates, and printed editions from the market place were also considered. The analysis as to the meanings and implications of Su Shi's writings was not clear-cut, in terms of whether they were actually treasonous, or whether they were in the bounds of acceptable expression. Much of Su Shi's testimony revolved around these points, what was said versus what Su Shi intended to imply: various matters being much open to interpretation, of erudite nature, involving scholarly allusions, often obscure, and, dating back over a millennium and more of a continuous literary tradition.

== Defense ==
Su Shi seems to have represented himself, as according with the legal tradition in China at the time, as would have been the case also with the other accused. His defense relied on admitting that he criticized the New Policy legislation and its supporters at the court. This criticism was legal, and his poetry would not have been needed to demonstrate that he was critical of these policies. Su Shi had in fact memorialized the emperor explicitly detailing his thoughts and feelings in this regard, in forceful prose. (Note: For a sample translation see de Bary 1960, pp. 425–431) To avoid conviction, it was necessary for Su Shi to avoid the prosecution being able to prove that he had criticized or demeaned the emperor or his dynasty: using poetry to give indirect advice to the emperor which involved criticism of his subordinates and suggested policy improvements could be construed as a service to the state, and indeed there was a time-honored tradition of doing so, dating back through the earliest phases of the Chinese poetic tradition. The main question was: did Su Shi's poems cross the line from criticizing the imperial subordinates and their actions, or did his criticism extend to actually defaming the emperor himself? Whether Su Shi had crossed this line was also key in the case of the other persons accused, as their indictments centered around publishing or disseminating Su Shi's poems, which if illegally found to defame the emperor, automatically made them guilty of criminal conspiracy, if found that they were even merely aware of the poems and failed to report them to the authorities.

== Trial ==
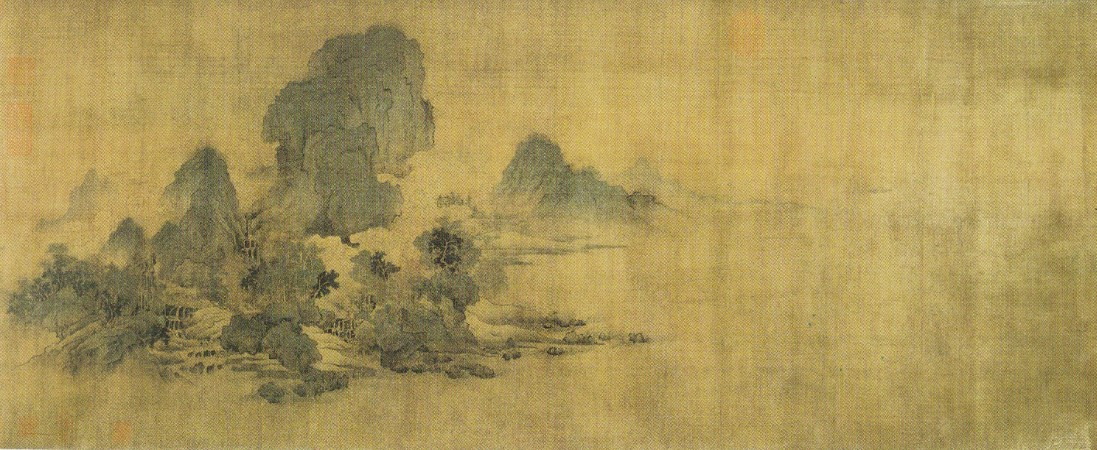
Misty River, Layered Peaks, by Wang Shen.

Su Shi's trial lasted for 4 months, starting in the summer of 1079: he was accused of writing or allowing writings to circulate that the government might consider to be treasonously derogatory to the person of the emperor or to the state, which were considered to be basically equivalent. The charges were of "denouncing the imperial chariot". and of "great irreverence toward the emperor": conviction carried a mandatory death penalty by beheading, according to the statutory Song penal code, although this had never yet been applied. Among the evidence were poems by Su Shi. Su Shi defended himself, denying accusations, or explaining how the lines of his poems really referred to the results of the actions of corrupt ministers, which according to ancient tradition it was incumbent as a duty of a loyal official to point out. In his trial, Su Shi confessed to such things as comparing the attachment of unscrupulous officials to their salaries with an owl's attachment to eating a rotten rat. According to Alfreda Murck, in a further confession, this time regarding the interpretation of a poem that he had written on the occasion of the banishment of Zeng Gong to serve in a remote government posting, Su Shi admitted: "This criticizes indirectly that many unfeeling men have recently been employed at Court, that their opinions are narrow-minded and make a raucous din like the sound of cicadas, and that they do not deserve to be heard." However, he omitted to enlighten the court upon his use in this poem of matched rhymes from Du Fu's "Autumn Day in Kui Prefecture", or the added meanings which could then be derived from his poem. In the end, Su Shi was convicted. The failure of the court to notice the extended meanings derivable by comparison of his rhymes with Du Fu's was apparent (to those in the know), and Su Shi and others, such as Wang Shen, having learned a way to avoid censorial persecution while still being able to express themselves to each other would continue to employ and expand upon this rhyme-matching, in conjunction with similarly coded painting.

== Sentencing ==
Numerous convictions resulted from the Crow Terrace Poetry Case. Sentences ranged from fines to exile. Some of the fines were quite large, and some of the exile destinations were to remote and dangerous locations, with little literary culture and a prevalence of malaria and other diseases. However, Su Shi and the rest avoided the death penalty.

=== Su Shi: Commutation of death sentence ===
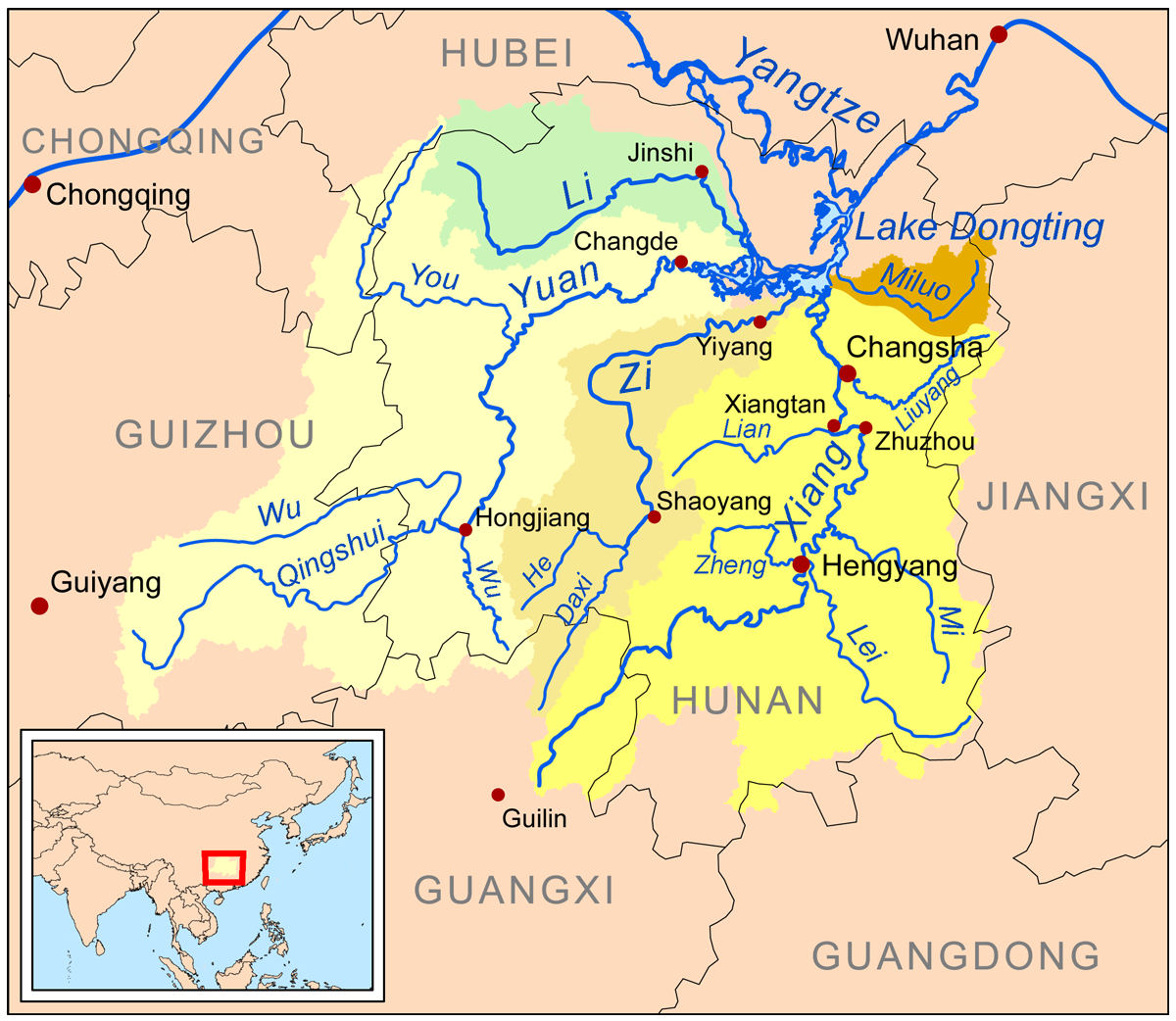
Map of the XiaoXiang area.

Su Shi avoided the death sentence, partly due to the embarrassment which the government would face for decapitating a popular figure for some verses of poetry which it took them 4 months to explain as being derogatory towards itself, and partly because of the influence of empress dowager Cao. Cao was Renzong's widow, and former regent, during the few years of the reign of the sickly and infirm emperor Yingzong. She remembered Renzong's pleasure at discovering the talents of the Su brothers through the imperial examinations process. Also, capital punishment by the public removal of Su Shi's head would have been a clear violation of the Song dynastic founder Taizu's precepts, who had had written in stone for all of his successors to read that "Officials and scholars must not be executed", as the 2nd of his 3 admonitions which each of his successors were supposed to kneel down before and to read as part of their ceremony of investiture as emperor. In early 1080, Su Shi was sentenced to exile, and placed under 2 years of house arrest, in a very remote and difficult place, the then relatively small village of Huangzhou District, on the Yangzi River. Technically the sentence was penal servitude for 2 years. At the end of the 2 years he was then by law allowed to apply to the imperial authority for recall from exile, but there was no legal mechanism by which this pardon would be automatically granted, and by this time Su's supporter dowager empress Cao was dead; thus, Su Shi remained in exile for a few more years.

=== Others ===
Others convicted included Su Shi's brother, Su Zhe, who was exiled. Huang Tingjian and his uncle Li were heavily fined, and Huang was exiled. In total, there were over 30 convictions.

== Social and political import ==
The Crow Terrace Poetry Case had an important and lasting effect on Song dynasty society and culture. The fact that a popular poet and popular government official could be censored and relegated to extreme exile had a chilling effect on freedom of speech.:

"The 1079 trial and conviction of a prominent figure, one of the realm's most respected scholars, marks a further change in political culture. Civil bureaucrats were losing security along with respect. Su's conviction caused consternation.... Already habituated to elaborate indirection in their commentaries and poetry, anti-reformers were revising or burning poems that might be interpreted as seditious".

== Poetry criticism ==
The Crow Terrace Poetry Trial's surviving manuscripts provide a rare instance of self-criticism by a poet. Su Shi was forced to defend himself against charges for which the chief evidence was his poetry. The surviving records of the case include detailed commentary by Su Shi on his own poems. The context in which his self-commentary is made tends to emphasize the political and social criticism implied in many of his poems, which may not otherwise be so evident today. Also, Su Shi's defense relied on making a case that his sociopolitical criticism was directed toward New Policy supporters as court, and not against the emperor himself or the state itself, rather that he was fulfilling a time-honored and legally acceptable function (if not indeed a duty), in which his poetry was intended as a service toward the emperor and the state (the "imperial chariot"), intended to advise rather than illegally criticize the emperor or the dynasty (criticism of Wang Anshi and other officials was legally permissible, as such, so long as no blame appeared to be directed towards the emperor for retaining their services).

== New poetry ==
Cold Food Observance. Su Shi's calligraphy is on the right side. Huang Tingjian's calligraphy is to its left. (Meant to be read right-to-left.)

Su Shi and friends continued to write poetry, despite (or perhaps encouraged by) their frequent banishment. Su Shi collected some of his extant works from friends, having ensured that any offending lines had been removed. Some of his poetry began more and more to use such a deep and subtle allusive process that it would be difficult for those outside his group to grasp the real meaning, let alone put him back on trial. One of these techniques was to use rhymes from other poems; thus, alluding to lines from that poem, and also alluding to other poems which Su Shi and his friends circulated which also matched these rhymes. Subtle complexities of profound political dissent could then be masked under cover of seemingly innocuous lines about nature scenes in the Xiaoxiang region: indeed a set of 8 conventional scenes evolved. These are known as the Eight Views of Xiaoxiang.
