= Xiaoxiang poetry =

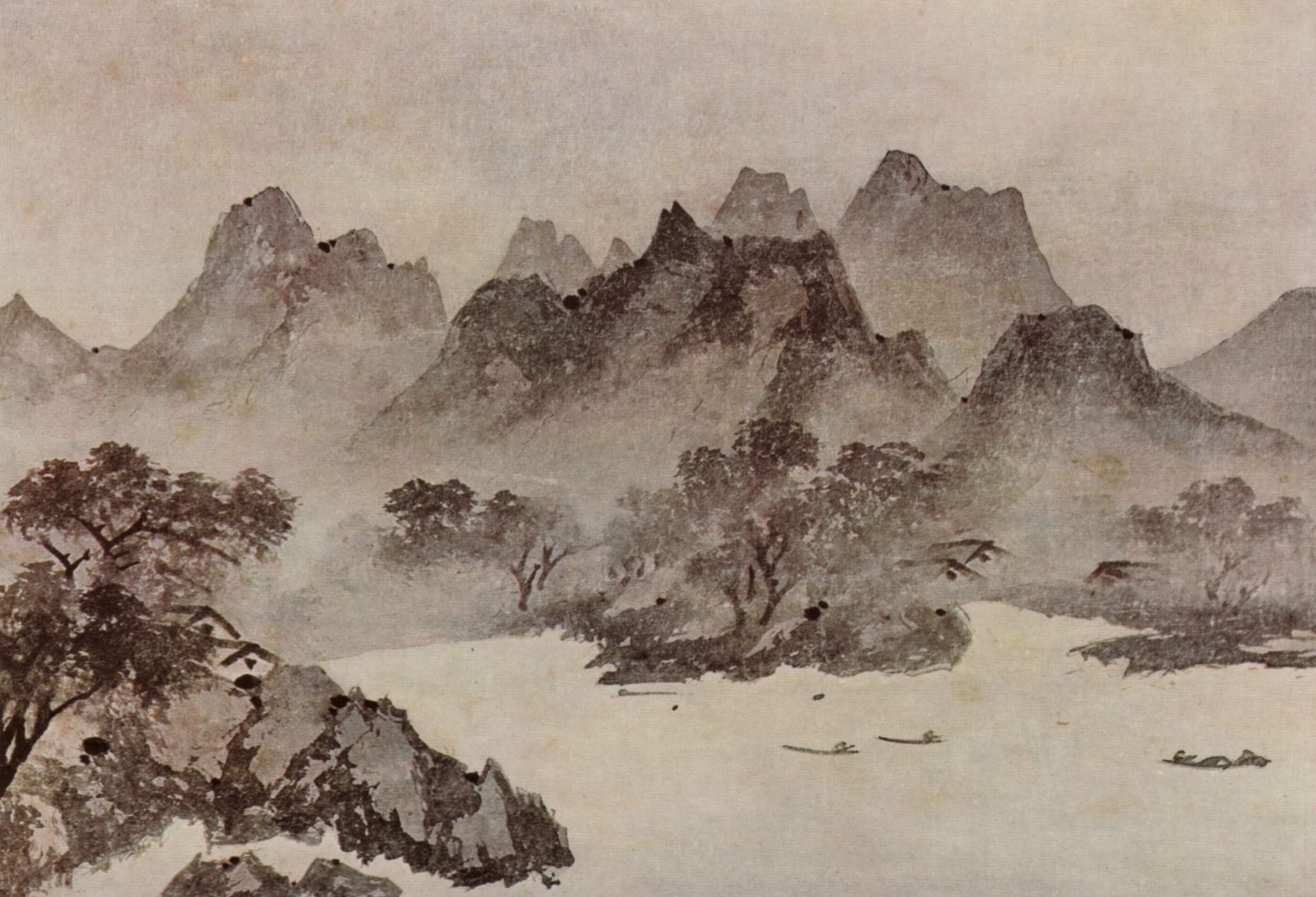
Xiaoxiang view painted about 1250. Attributed to Muqi Fachang.

Xiaoxiang poetry is one of the Classical Chinese poetry genres, one which has been practiced for over a thousand years. It is a poetry of scenic wonders, a poetry of officials exiled for their views and beliefs, and a poetry of dissent against submitting to government control. Xiaoxiang poetry is geographically associated with the Xiaoxiang region, around and south of Dongting Lake. The Xiaoxiang genre of literature is often associated with similarly themed Chinese calligraphy and Chinese painting. Famous poets in this genre include Qu Yuan, Song Yu, Jia Yi, Wang Yi, Yu Xin, Shen Quanqi, Zhang Yue, Li Bai, Du Fu, Han Yu, Liu Zongyuan, and Su Shi.

== Name ==
Xiaoxiang appears as a name with various spellings and transcriptions, such as: (simplified Chinese: 潇湘; traditional Chinese: 瀟湘; pinyin: Xiāo Xiāng), also transliterated XiaoXiang. Xiao-Xiang, Hsiao Hsiang, and Chiu Chiang, in some older sources. Poems written according to various of the Classical Chinese poetry forms may be considered to be Xiaoxiang poetry genre.

== Xiaoxiang region ==
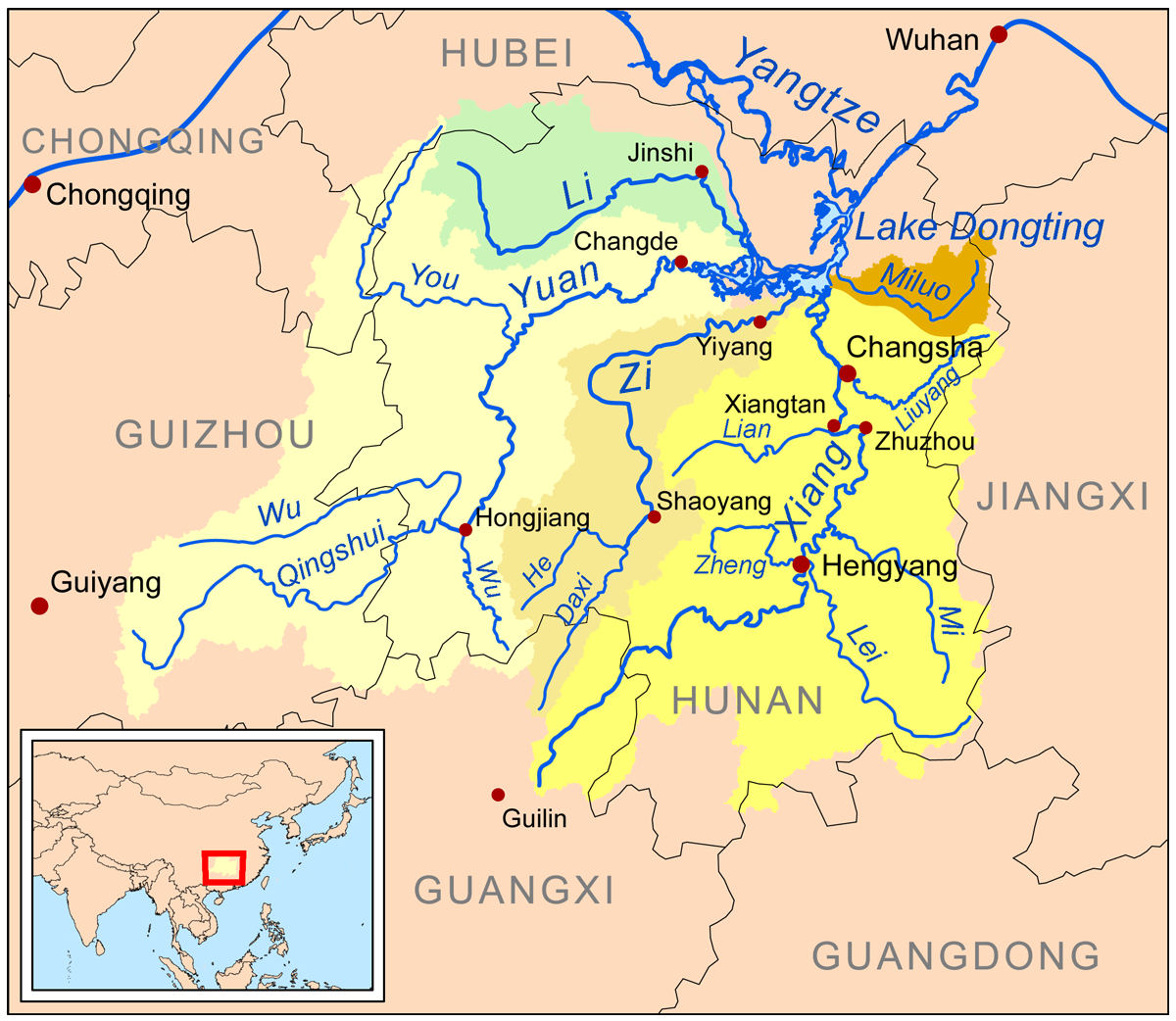
Map showing various lakes and rivers in the Xiaoxiang region, including the Xiao and Xiang Rivers

The Xiaoxiang poetry genre is symbolically oriented around a certain geographic region, known as the Xiaoxiang, more-or-less modern Hunan Province. "Xiaoxiang" refers to the "lakes and rivers" region in south-central China south of the middle-reaches of the Yangtze River and more-or-less corresponding with Hunan province: it is less a precise geographic entity than a concept:

XiaoXiang poetry is not just about a place; it is also about giving subtle expression to discontent.

The Xiaoxiang region was a typical place of exile for the poet-officials of numerous Chinese dynasties, from the 3rd century BCE, or earlier. Although not allowed to necessarily speak their mind about their feelings in this regard, on penalty of further punishment, many of the exiles felt that the exile was unjustified and that they were being punished unjustly for performing their duties according to their sense of conscience. The sense of punishment was a complex of various factors: generally the exiles continued on serving as governmental officials, but receiving a demotion in status and a decrease in salary; the geographic distance and terrain made travel between the Xiaoxiang and the Central Plains regions of China onerous, dangerous and lengthy; the Xiaoxiang exiles were denied direct contact with the sophisticated, urban society of the imperial capital, having to adapt to different customs, dialects, or languages of the region, and for the most part denied direct association with their peers; the climate was hotter and more humid than they were accustomed to, and the fear of associated disease made many of the exiles to the Xiaoxiang area complain about the huge risk to their life and health involved, something which known cases of exiles succumbing to illness shortly after being posted there did little to dispel. The complaints about the region generally found a balanced tension in the Xiaoxiang poetry with the hopes for a pardon for the crimes for which they had been convicted, or a reprieve of their sentences, and especially for the recall back home.

== Mythology ==
Even before the beginnings of modern recorded history, the Xiaoxiang region was the part of a rich cultural tradition, including shamanic religious traditions and mythology. Reference to this tradition is a part of the Xiaoxiang poetry. References are made to Shun (also known as Chong Hua) and to the Xiang River goddesses. Although he is generally considered historical to some extent, other references frequently involve the mythology surrounding Qu Yuan.

== History ==
The Xiaoxiang poetry tradition begins with Qu Yuan, of the Kingdom of Chu, before the initial unification of China into an empire. Further development continued on through the Han dynasty, the Tang dynasty and the Tang poetry, and on into the times of the Song dynasty and the Song poetry. With such exponents as Du Fu and Su Shi, the Xiaoxiang genre of poetry continued as a vigorous source of inspiration for Chinese poetry and contribution to culture.

=== Qu Yuan and Chuci ===
The Xiaoxiang poetry tradition begins with the Chuci tradition, which was associated with Qu Yuan's exile, in the centuries before the Common Era, and continued to be developed through the times of the Han dynasty, in the milieu of Han poetry, when the work entitled Chuci was published in what is basically its modern form.

Although many of the poets of the early tradition are anonymous, another important name linked with this tradition is Song Yu, who, like Qu Yuan, was a native of Chu, traditionally thought to have been wrongfully and mistakenly dismissed from court despite possessing both great talents and loyalty.

=== Han dynasty ===
Besides the Han dynasty writers and editors, such as Wang Yi, who contributed to the Chuci, another important Han era poet in the Xiaoxiang tradition was Jia Yi, who was exiled by Han Wendi to Changsha. On his way into exile, and upon crossing the Xiang River, Jia Yi wrote a fu named "Lament for Qu Yuan". After 3 years in exile, at sunset, an owl flew into his room: the depressed Jia Yi considered this as an omen of his exile soon reaching its miserable end, but only by means of his impending death, as signaled by this avian harbinger of doom; and so, he wrote another and subsequently renowned fu, "The Owl". After making these contributions to the Xiaoxiang poetry tradition, Jia Yi nevertheless lived on to be subsequently recalled to court.

=== Six Dynasties ===
During the Six Dynasties period, Yu Xin contributed to the Six Dynasties poetry in the genre of the Xiaoxiang poetry. Born into the Liang nobility, upon the defeat of Liang he was kept in captivity in the state of Western Wei. His fu "Lament for the South" is known in this regard.

=== Tang dynasty ===
Further development of the Xiaoxiang poetry genre continued on through the Tang dynasty, including the interlude of Wu Zetian's "Zhou" dynasty, with authors such as Shen Quanqi, Zhang Yue, Li Bai, Du Fu, Han Yu, and Liu Zongyuan.

=== Song dynasty ===
Su Shi, Huang Tingjian, and other poets of the Song dynasty wrote poetry in the Xiaoxiang genre.

== Influence ==
=== Eight Views of Xiaoxiang ===
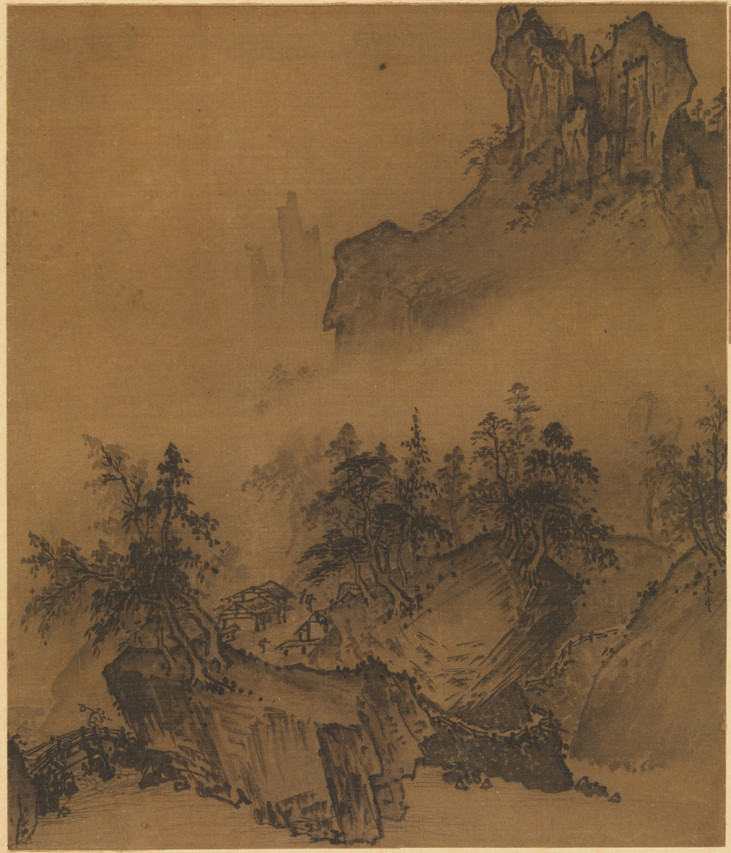
Xia Gui (Song dynastic era) – "Mountain Market- Clear with Rising Mist", one of the 8 scenarios.

Xiaoxiang poetry and Chinese painting were fruitfully and mutually influential with each other in the development of the Eight Views of Xiaoxiang genre of serial art. A standard list is:

- Geese Descending to Level Sand (平沙雁落)
- Sail Returning from Distant Shore (遠浦帆歸)
- Mountain Market, Clearing Mist (山市晴嵐)
- River and Sky, Evening Snow (江天暮雪)
- Autumn Moon over Dongting (洞庭秋月)
- Night Rain on the Xiao Xiang (瀟湘夜雨)
- Evening Bell from Mist-Shrouded Temple (煙寺晚鍾)
- Fishing Village in Evening Glow (漁村夕照)

== See also ==
- "Autumn Day in Kui Prefecture"
- Classical Chinese poetry
- Classical Chinese poetry genres
- Crow Terrace Poetry Trial
- Dong Yuan
- Eight Views of Xiaoxiang
- Fu (poetry) § Sociopolitical protest
- Geese in Chinese poetry
- "Li Sao"
- Ovid, a Roman (for cross-cultural comparison), wrote poems of exile, collected in Tristia and Epistulae ex Ponto
- Song Di
- Spotted bamboo
- Xiang River
