= Wang Shen (Song dynasty) =

Wang Shen 王詵
- Born: c. 1036
- Died: c. 1093 (aged 56–57)
- Other name: Jinqing (晋卿)
- Occupations: Calligrapher, painter, poet, politician
- Spouse: Princess Xianhui
- Children: One son

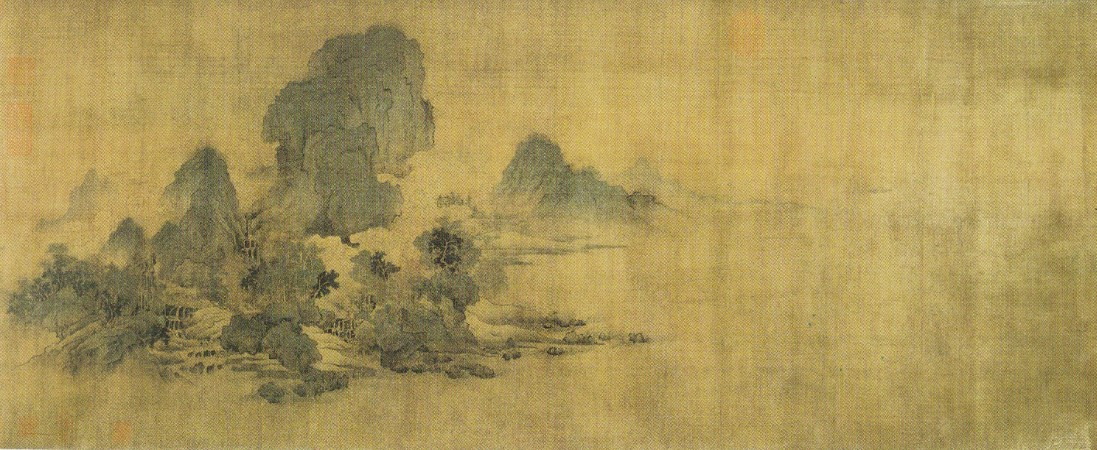
"Misty River, Layered Peaks" by Wang Shen

Wang Shen (c. 1036 – c. 1093), courtesy name Jinqing, was a Chinese calligrapher, painter, poet, and politician of the Song dynasty. He is best known for his surviving paintings, poetry, and calligraphy (Murck 2000, pp. 126–156), and for his relationships with prominent statesmen and early amateur literati artists such as Su Shi, Huang Tingjian and Mi Fu.

== Life ==
Born in the city of Taiyuan, Shanxi Province, Wang rose to a senior military position before marrying Princess Shuguo (1051-1080), the daughter of Emperor Yingzong of Song. Her older brother, Emperor Shenzong of Song, succeeded Yingzong to the throne.

In 1079, Wang was implicated in a political scandal by virtue of his friendship with Su Shi and demoted as a result of the Crow Terrace Poetry Trial, before later being exiled from the Song capital for three years.

== Painting ==
Wang was an accomplished amateur painter, whose widely accepted surviving works are handscrolls depicting landscape scenes. One of these, painted in ink with light color in the stylistic tradition of Li Cheng and Guo Xi, is entitled "Light Snow on a Fishing Village". A handscroll in the Shanghai Museum called "Misty River, Layered Peaks" is painted in a blue-and-green palette associated with Tang painter Li Sixun. Another landscape handscroll in the Shanghai Museum shares the same title but depicts a different scene. It is noteworthy for a series of poems Wang and Su wrote each other on the scroll. Richard Barnhart has proposed that a hanging scroll attributed to Guo Xi in the Shanghai Museum is instead a fourth surviving painting by Wang.

== Poetry ==
Although less remembered as a poet than a painter, Wang Shen traded rhymes with Su Shi, one of the most renowned poets of the Song dynastic era, if not all time.

== See also ==
- Classical Chinese poetry
- Crow Terrace Poetry Trial
- Emperor Shenzong of Song
- Huang Tingjian
- Li Cheng (painter)
- Mi Fu
- Su Shi
- Xiaoxiang poetry
