= Xiao River =

Coordinates: 26°12′15″N 111°38′28″E

Xiao River Xiaoshui, Shenshui, Daqiao River, Feng River, Dong River, Tuojiang, etc.
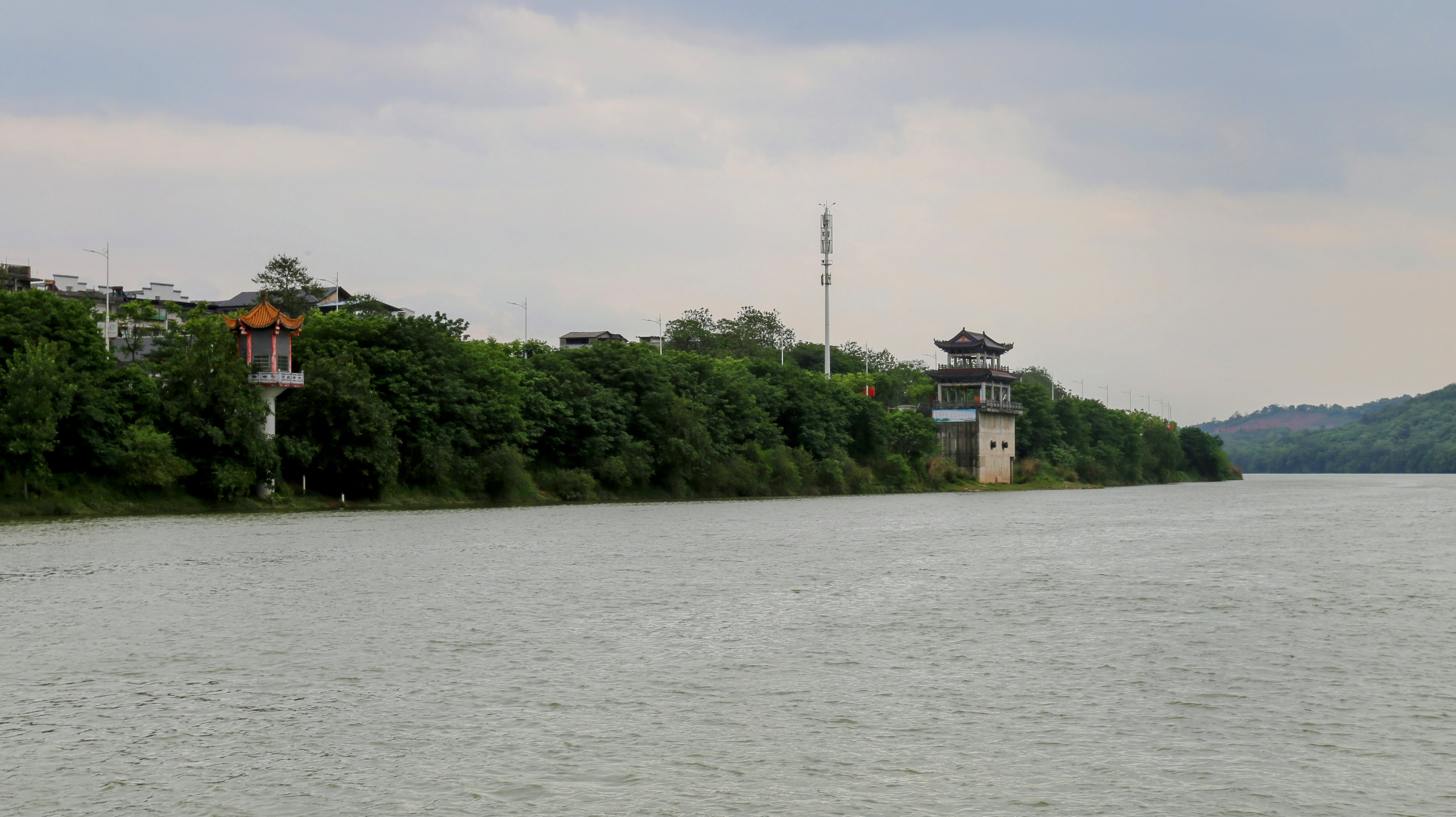
- Picture of Xiao River in Yongzhou, Hunan, China.

- Location in Hunan
- Native name: 潇水 (Chinese)

Location
- Country: China
- Province: Hunan
- City: Yongzhou

Physical characteristics
- Source
  - location: Yegou Mountain (野狗岭)
- Mouth
  - location: Ping Island (萍岛)
- Length: 365 km (227 mi)
- Discharge
  - location: Yongzhou
  - average: 345 m^{3}/s (12,200 cu ft/s)

Basin features
- River system: Xiang River

The Xiao River (Chinese: 瀟水; pinyin: Xiāoshuǐ [ɕjáʊ.ʂwèɪ]) is the main stream of the upper Xiang River located in Yongzhou, Hunan. As of the 2011 Water Census of China, it has a length of 365 kilometres (227 mi) from the headwaters to the confluence in the Ping Island of Yongzhou with the Xiang River West Branch (Left Branch) originating from Guangxi. With the tributaries, its drainage basin area is 12,094 square kilometres (4,670 sq mi). Night rain on the Xiaoxiang (瀟湘夜雨 Xiāoxiāng yèyǔ), one of the Eight Views of Xiaoxiang, is located at this river.

== Geography ==
The Xiao River borders to the south by the Mengzhu Mountains and Gui River of Xi River tributary, to the east by Yangming Mountains (阳明山), Chongling River and Lianjiang River of Bei River tributary, to the west by the Dupang Mountains. The tributaries of the Xiao reach Lianzhou of Guangdong and Guangxi. Originating from the southern side of Yegou Mountain (野狗岭) in Zhulin Village (竹林村) of Xiangjiangyuan Township, Lanshan County, the Xiao River flows southwest to northeast through Lanshan, Jianghua, Jiangyong, Ningyuan, Dao, Shuangpai and Lingling seven counties, joining the Main Stem of the Xiang at the confluence in Ping Island of Yongzhou with the West Branch from Guangxi.

== See also ==
- List of rivers in China
- Xiaoxiang
- Hunan
