= Jiuyi Mountains =

Mountain range in Hunan, China

Jiuyi Range
- 九嶷山
- Location within China

Highest point
- Elevation: 1,959 m (6,427 ft)
- Coordinates: 25°25′15″N 113°2′49″E

Geography
- Location: Hunan, China
- Parent range: Mengzhu Mountains, Nanling Range

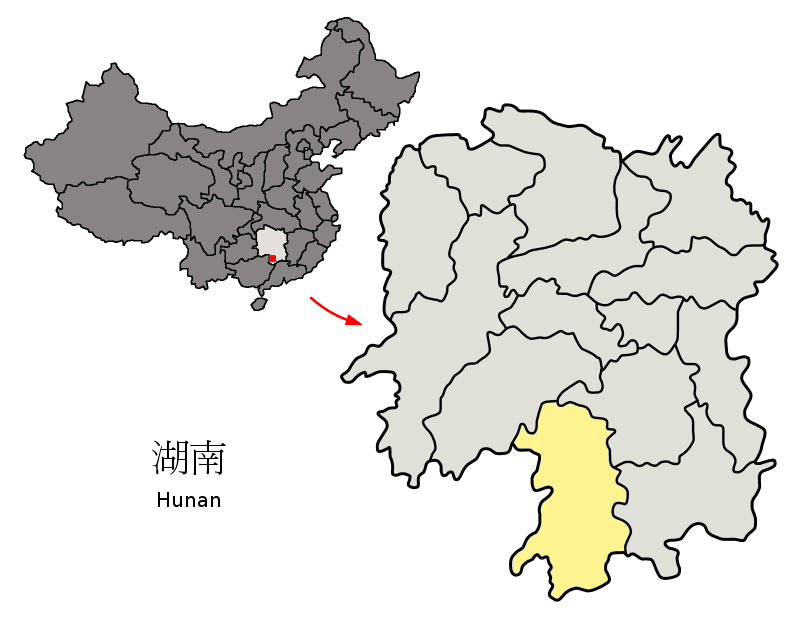
Location of Yongzhou Prefecture within Hunan

The Jiuyi Mountains (Chinese: 九嶷山 Jiuyi Shan) are a mountain range in Hunan province, China. They are located in the Yongzhou, Ningyuan and Lanshan region, bordering Guangdong province. They are part of the Mengzhu Mountains of the Nanling Range.

These mountains are reputed to be the burial place of Emperor Shun in ancient Chinese tradition.

It is traditionally inhabited by the Yao people. Autonomous counties include: Daqiao Yao Ethnic Township
