= Eight Views of Taiwan =

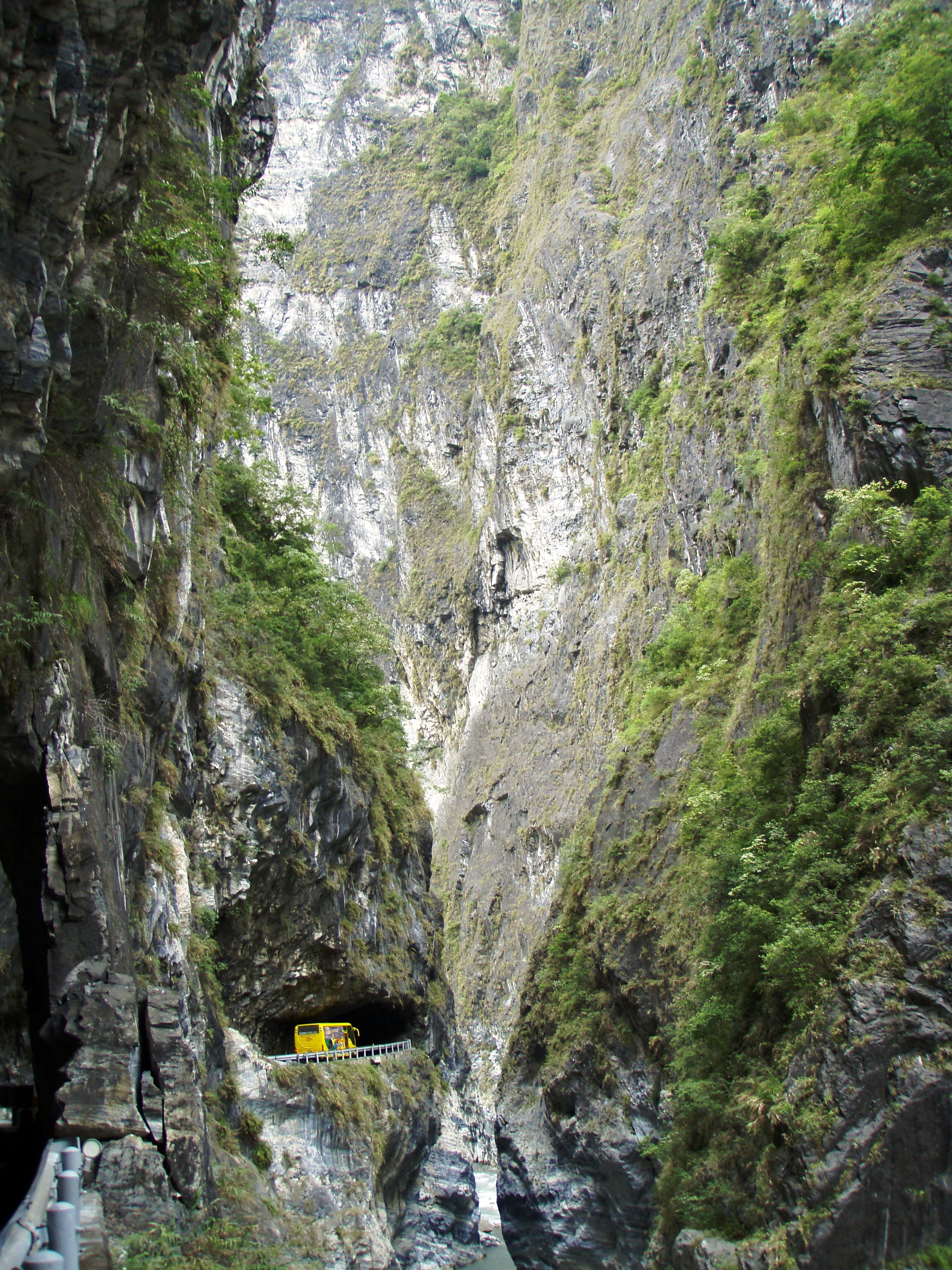
Taroko Gorge

The Eight Views of Taiwan (Chinese: 臺灣八景) have been variously defined throughout Taiwan's history.

== Under Japanese occupation ==
In 1927 (during the Japanese occupation of Taiwan), the newspaper Taiwan Nichinichi Shimpō (Japanese: 臺灣日日新報) elected the Eight Views of Taiwan according to its readers' votes as:

- Rising Sun Hill (旭岡), now Sun Yat-sen Park, Keelung
- Tamsui
- Eight Immortals Mountain
- Sun Moon Lake
- Alishan
- Monkey Mountain
- Cape Eluanbi
- Taroko

== Republic of China ==
After the retrocession of Taiwan to the Republic of China, the Taiwan Provincial Government defined the Eight Views of Taiwan in 1953 as follows:

- Sun Moon Lake
- Yushan
- Fort Zeelandia
- Alishan
- Yangmingshan
- Taroko
- Qingshui Cliff
- Penghu Islands

In 2005, an updated version of the Eight Views of Taiwan was published by the ROC Ministry of Transportation and Communications:

- Taipei 101
- National Palace Museum
- Sun Moon Lake
- Alishan
- Yushan
- Kaohsiung Love River
- Kenting
- Taroko

== See also ==
- Eight Views in China, Japan and Korea
- Eight Views of Xiaoxiang
- Eight Views of Jinzhou (Dalian)
- Eight Views of Lushun South Road, Dalian
- Eight Views of Omi, Japan
- Eight Views of Korea
- Thirty-six Views of Mount Fuji, by Hokusai and Hiroshige
