= Song Di =

Minor government official, writer, and a painter of the Chinese painting tradition

- Chinese: 宋迪
- Hanyu Pinyin: Sòng Dí

Courtesy name (zi)
- Traditional Chinese: 復古
- Simplified Chinese: 复古
- Literal meaning: Recovering antiquity
- Hanyu Pinyin: Fùgǔ

Song Di (Chinese: 宋迪; pinyin: Sòng Dí) (c. 1015 – c. 1080), courtesy name Fugu, was a minor government official, writer, and a painter of the Chinese painting tradition. He was one of three brothers, and part of the Song clan which had served in government offices for six generations. Song Di was part of the social milieu of a major artistic period of the Song dynasty, and is largely known through his interactions with famous figures of the period, such as Su Shi and Sima Guang. He is especially acknowledged as the original creator of the Eight Views of Xiaoxiang.

== Family ==
Song Di had many well-known relatives, including his brothers Dao and Xuan.

== Career ==
Song Di's career began when he passed his jinshi in the same year as his brother Dao, who achieved some measure of fame for coming in first in one of the sections. The career as governmental officials of the three Song brothers, Di, Dao, and their older brother Xuan was in part shaped through their friendship with Sima Guang; and also, through the friendship of Su Shi with the Song family. During Emperor Renzong of Song's final regnal era (Jiayou, 1056–1063) Song Di held the posts of assistant for transport commission and vice director of administration in Changsha, an important commercial and administrative city located on along the lower reaches of the Xiang River. In 1062, Song Di was in the city now known as Kaifeng, with the Imperial examinations. Song Di's career came to an abrupt end after he was blamed for a fire in a government building.

== Works ==
All of Song Di's writings have been lost. Also, most or all of Song Di's original paintings have been lost. However, works which reference him by important poets and painters still exist.

== Influence ==
Song Di's major influence was in creating the original set of Eight Views of Xiaoxiang.

== See also ==
- Classical Chinese poetry genres
- Xiaoxiang poetry
