= Eight Views of Pyongyang =

Scenic places in Pyongyang, North Korea

- Chosŏn'gŭl: 평양팔경
- Hancha: 平壤八景
- Revised Romanization: Pyeongyang Palgyeong
- McCune–Reischauer: P'yŏngyang P'algyŏng

The Eight Views of Pyongyang are a collection of scenic views of Pyongyang, North Korea, that are alleged to have been handed down from the time of the Joseon dynasty in Korean poetry and paintings.

They were modeled after the Eight Views of Xiaoxiang of the Song dynasty of China.

== The Eight Views ==
1. Admiring spring from Ulmildae (Ŭlmil Sangch'un, 을밀상춘/乙密賞春)
2. Enjoying the moon at Pubyokru (Pubyŏk Wanwŏl, 부벽완월/浮碧翫月)
3. Monk searching at Yongmyongsa (Yŏngmyŏng Samsŭng, 영명삼승/永明尋僧)
4. Seeing off travelers at Pothong River (Pot'ong Songgaek, 보통송객/普通送客)
5. Boating on the Taedong River (Kŏmun Pŏpch'u, 거문범추/車門泛舟)
6. Listening to rain at the lotus pond (Ryŏndang Ch'ŏngu, 련당청우/蓮塘聴雨)
7. Evening kingfishers at Mt. Ryongak (Ryongsan Manch'wi, 룡산만취/龍山晩翠)
8. Spring floods at Mat'an (Mat'an Ch'ungyŏng, 마탄춘경/馬灘春漲)

== See also ==
- Eight Views of Korea
- Eight Views
