= Eight Views of Danyang =

Tourist destinations in South Korea

The Eight Views (or Vistas) of Danyang (Korean: 단양팔경; Hanja: 丹陽八景) are the selected natural scenes of Danyang County, North Chungcheong Province in Korea.

== General ==
The Eight Views (or Vistas) of Danyang are the selected natural scenes of Danyang County, North Chungcheong Province in Korea. They are mainly famous rocks and peaks of this mountainous region.

- Dodam Sambong (3 Peak Island - 도담삼봉; 島潭三峰)
- Seokmun (Stone Gate - 석문; 石門)
- Gudambong (Hanja:亀潭峰)
- Oksunbong (Hanja:玉筍峰)
- Sangseonam (Hanja:上仙岩)
- Jungseonam (Hanja:中仙岩)
- Haseonam (Hanja:下仙岩)
- Sainam (Hanja:舎人岩)

Among these sights the best known is Dodam Sambong (3 Peak Island), representing the typical love triangle of ancient Korea: a husband, his wife and his mistress. The biggest peak, about 20 feet high with a pavilion on top, in the middle represents the husband, while the first smaller peak on one side of the husband is the wife. On the other side the smallest peak is the mistress. According to legend, the wife was not able to give birth to a son, so the husband found a mistress to produce a son. The wife was upset, which is why the wife peak is farther from the husband than the mistress. If you look at the wife from a specific angle and use a bit of imagination, you will see that the wife was so angry that she turned away from the husband.

Danyang County is in the area of the Namhan River, upstream south of the Han River where Seoul is located. It is said to be in the middle of the route on which the Chinese culture in ancient days reached the southern area of Korean and ultimately Japan.

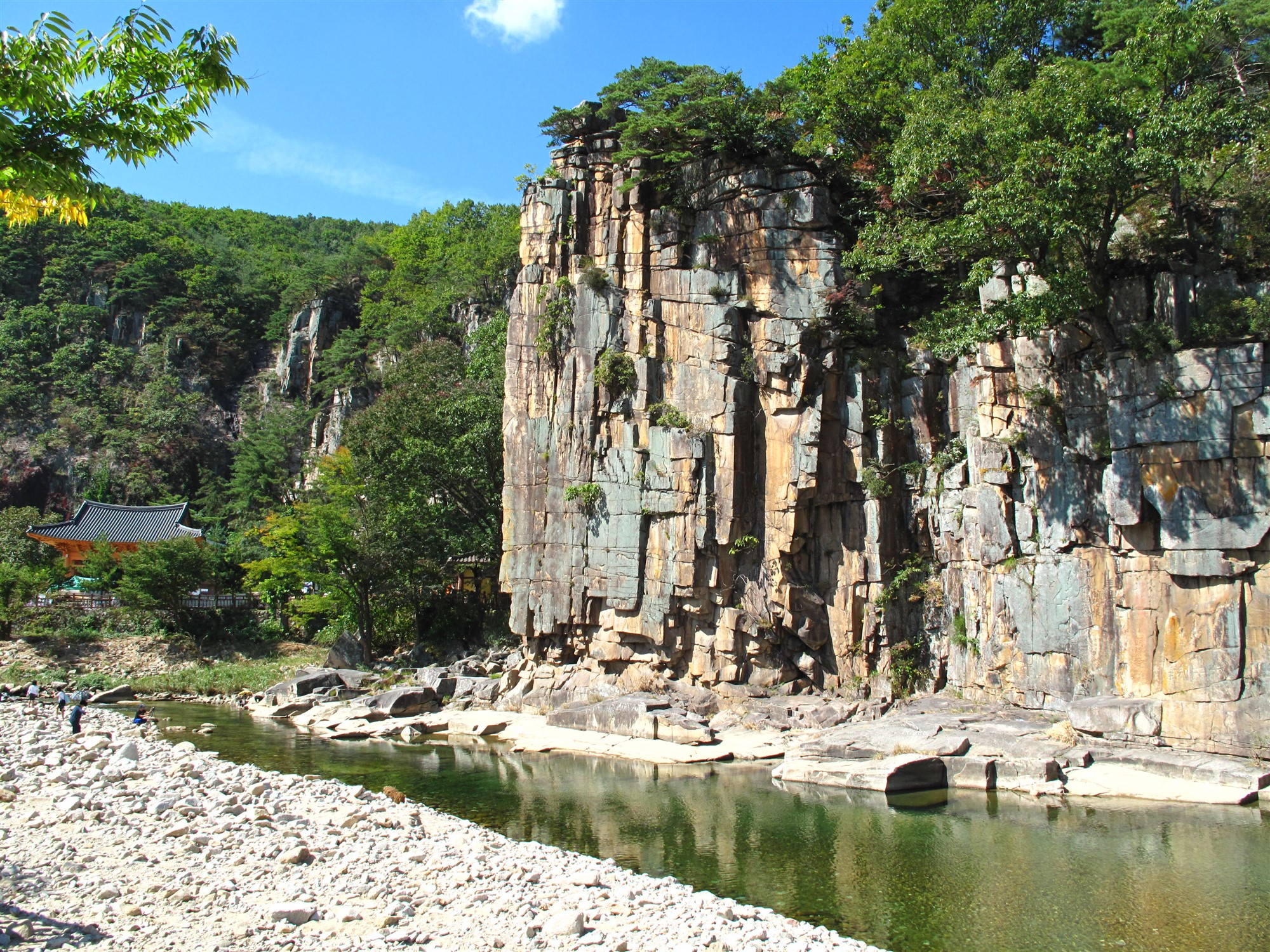
Sainam Cliff near Danyang

== See also ==
- Eight Views
- Eight Views of Korea
