= Ping Island =

Coordinates: 26°15′07″N 111°36′18″E

Ping Island (Chinese: 𬞟岛, 萍岛, 𬞟洲, or 萍洲; pinyin: píng dǎo or píng zhōu) is a river island with a general perimeter of about 600 metres (2,000 ft) and an area of 0.6 square kilometres (0.23 sq mi) in the middle north of Lingling District, Yongzhou, Hunan.

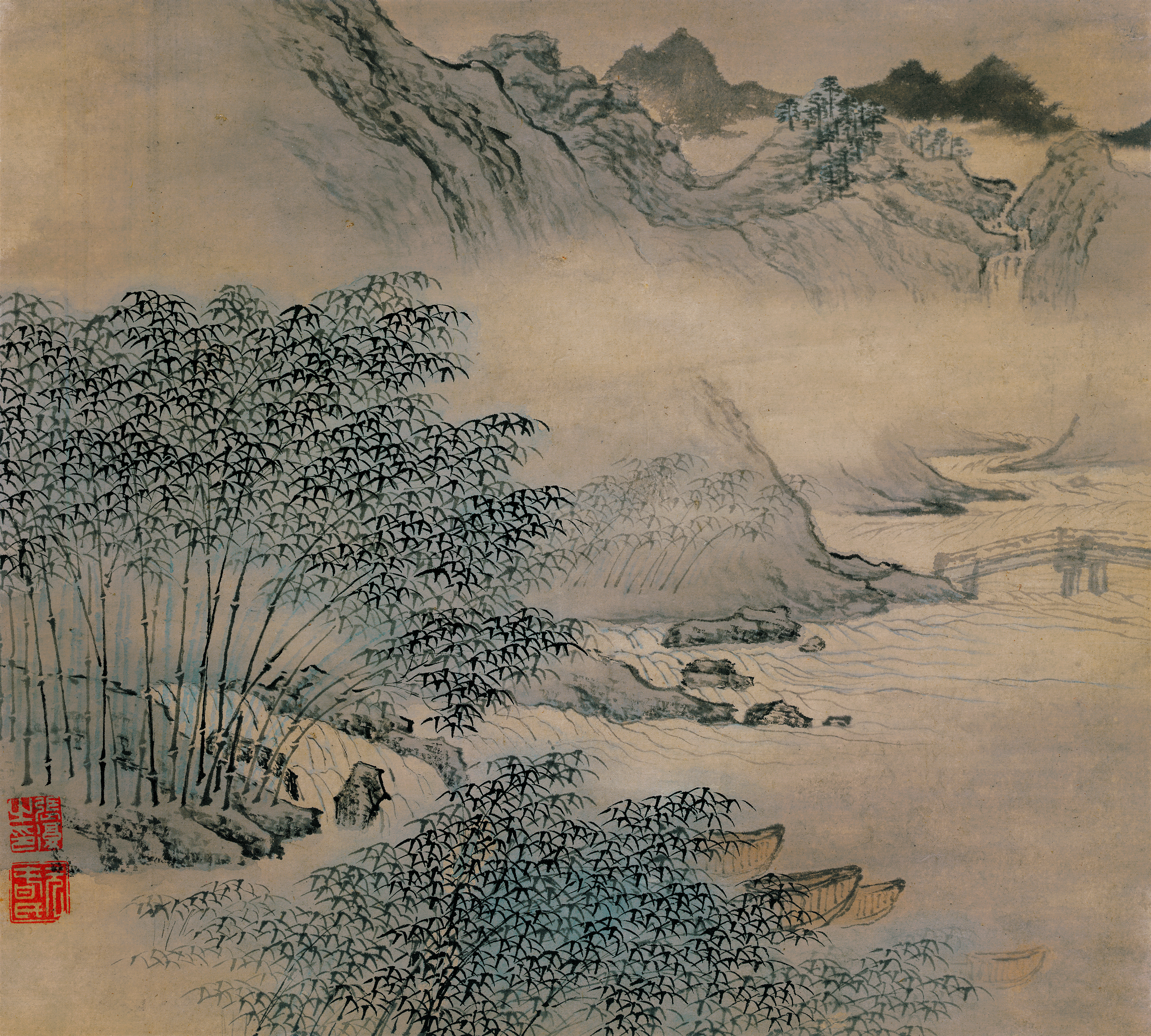
A painting by Zhang Fu during Ming Dynasty depicts the "Night rain on Xiaoxiang"

As one of the main attractions in Yongzhou, it is located at the confluence of the east branch and west branch (from Guangxi) of the Xiao River, and the main course of the Xiang River. Night rain on Xiaoxiang(Chinese: 潇湘夜雨; pinyin: xiāoxiāng yèyǔ) in Eight Views of Xiaoxiang is about Ping Island.

Pingzhou academy (Chinese: 萍洲书院 or 蘋洲書院; pinyin: píng zhōu shū yuàn) is one of the four major shuyuan in Hunan Province. Located on Ping Island, it was originally built in 1739 and was last rebuilt in 2013.
