= Tafeng =

Tafeng 塔峰镇
- Town
- Location in Hunan
- Coordinates: 25°22′39″N 112°12′12″E
- Country: People's Republic of China
- Province: Hunan
- County: Lanshan

Area
  - Total: 285.7 km^{2} (110.3 sq mi)

Population (2015)
  - Total: 150,800
  - Density: 527.8/km^{2} (1,367/sq mi)
- Time zone: UTC+8 (China Standard)
- Postal code: 4258XX
- Languages: Xiangnan Tuhua, Standard Chinese

Tafeng Town (Chinese: 塔峰镇; pinyin: tǎfēng zhèn) is a town and the county seat of Lanshan County, Hunan, China. The town covers an area of 285.7 square kilometres (110.3 sq mi), as of November 2015, it has a population of 150,800. It is divided into 21 villages and 6 communities, and the seat of the town is at Gucheng Village.

== Geography ==
Tafeng is located in the central Lanshan. It is bordered to the north by Nanshi (楠市) and Tushi (土市) townships, to the east by Taipingyu (太平圩) and Maojun (毛俊) towns, to the south by Jiangdong (浆洞) and Suocheng (所城) townships, to the west by Huiyuan (汇源), Litou (犁头) and Citangyu (祠堂圩) townships.

== History ==
The modern-day Tafeng Town is the land of the historic Chengguan Town (城关镇), Gucheng Township (古城乡), Longxi Township (龙溪乡), Zhuguansi Township (竹管寺乡) and Zongshi Township (总市乡).

The former Tafeng Town was part of the historic Zhengzhong Town (正中镇) in 1949, part of the historic Zhengzhong District (正中区) in 1950. The Chengguan Town was created from part of the historic Zhengzhong District in 1952. With establishing the Dongfeng People's Commune (东风人民公社), the Chengguan Town was merged with Gucheng (古城), Longxi (龙溪) and Huiyuan (汇源) three townships in 1958. The Chengguan Town was reformed in 1962, the Gucheng Towhship was merged to the Chengguan in 1987. The Longxi Township was merged into the Chengguan, meanwhile the Chengguan Town was renamed as Tafeng Town, Zongshi Township was merged to Zhuguansi Town (竹管寺镇) in June 1995. On November 18, 2015, the modern-day Tafeng Town was reformed by merging the former Zhuguansi Town, the former Tafeng Town and 21 villages of Maojun Town (毛俊镇).
