= Xinglian Road Bridge =

Xinglian Road Bridge 兴联路大桥
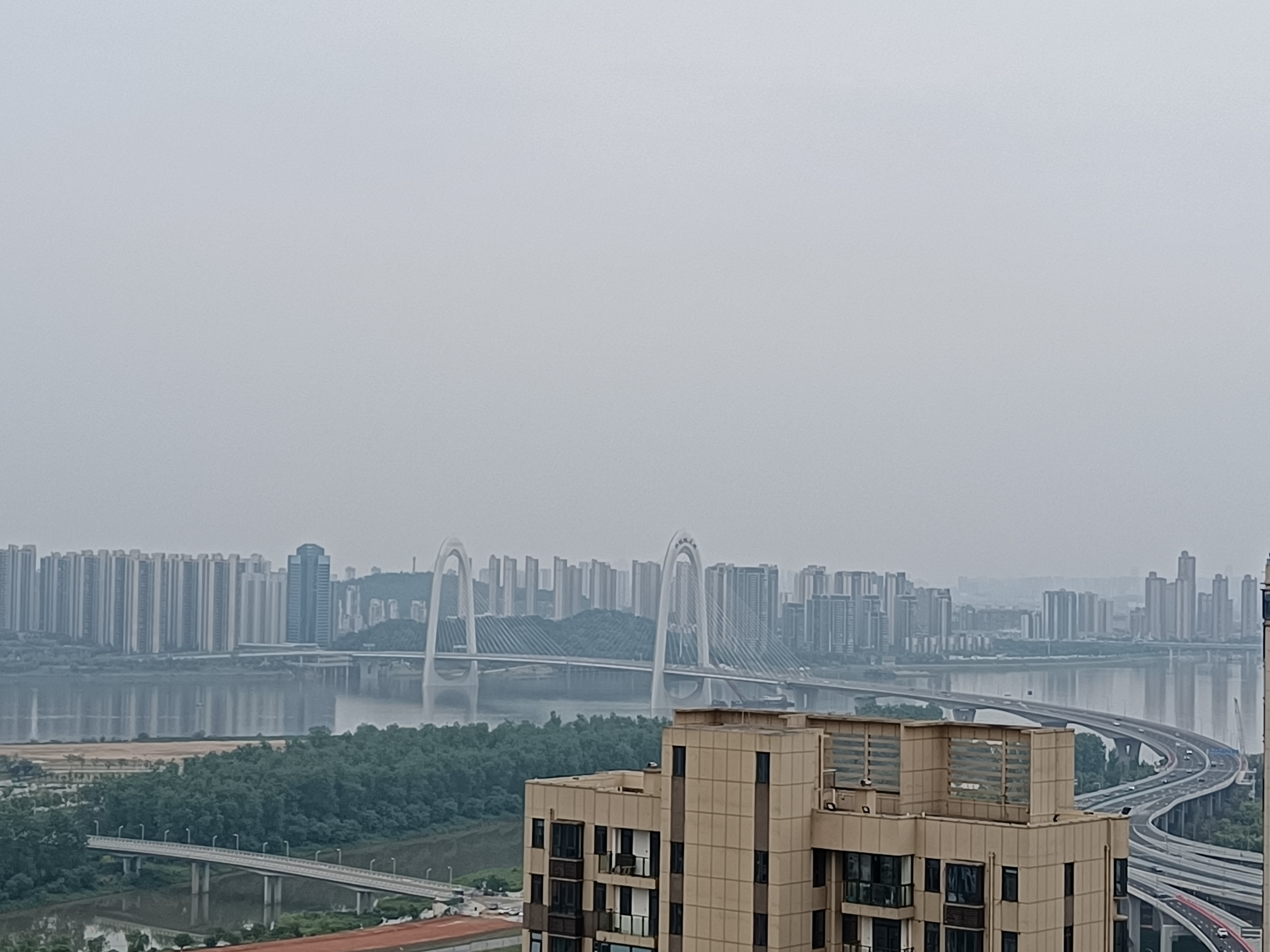
- Xinglian Road Bridge
- Coordinates: 28.2898°N 112.9480°E
- Carries: Pedestrians and bicycles
- Crosses: Xiang River
- Locale: Changsha, Hunan, China

Characteristics
- Design: Cable-stayed bridge
- Material: Stone
- Total length: 4.96 kilometres (3.08 mi)
- Longest span: 380 metres (1,250 ft)

History
- Constructed by: CCCC First Highway Engineering Group Co., Ltd. Hunan Provincial Transportation Planning Survey and Design Institute Co., Ltd.
- Construction start: September 2021
- Construction end: April 2025
- Opened: 28 April 2025

Location
- Interactive map of Xinglian Road Bridge

The Xinglian Road Bridge (simplified Chinese: 兴联路大桥; traditional Chinese: 興聯路大橋; pinyin: Xīnglián Lù Dàqiáo) is bridge over the Xiang River in Kaifu District/ Wangcheng District of Changsha, Hunan, China.

The total investment of the Xinglian Road Bridge route is 3.793 billion yuan, with a main bridge length of 4.96 kilometres (3.08 mi). The main bridge crossing the Xiang River is a twin tower cable-stayed bridge with a main span of 380 meters, eight lanes in both directions, and a traffic speed of up to 60 kilometers per hour (50 kilometers per hour in the East Xiang River section). It is connected to the Changyi Expressway in the west and Xinglian Road urban arterial road in the east, including four main traffic arteries: Yinshan Road, Xiaoxiang Avenue, Xiangjiang Avenue, and Furong Road.

== History ==
Construction of Xinglian Road Bridge, designed by the CCCC First Highway Engineering Group Co., Ltd. and Hunan Provincial Transportation Planning Survey and Design Institute Co., Ltd., commenced in September 2021. Xinglian Road Bridge was officially opened to traffic at 11:18 am on 28 April 2025.
