= Eight Views =

East Asian term for beautiful places

Chinese name
- Chinese: 八景
Transcriptions
Standard Mandarin
- Hanyu Pinyin: bājǐng bā jǐng
- Wade–Giles: pa ching pa-ching
- IPA: [pá.tɕìŋ]
Wu
- Wugniu: paeq^{7} cin^{3}
- IPA: Shanghainese: [paʔ˧ tɕin˦]
Yue: Cantonese
- Yale Romanization: baat-gíng
- Jyutping: baat^{3} ging^{2}
- IPA: [pat̚˧.kɪŋ˧˥]

Korean name
- Hangul: 팔경
- Hanja: 八景
Transcriptions
- Revised Romanization: palgyeong
- McCune–Reischauer: p'algyŏng

Japanese name
- Kanji: 八景
Transcriptions
- Romanization: hakkei

The Eight Views is an East Asian term used to allude to the most beautiful or otherwise significant scenes of a certain area. It is a term often used in East Asia. Historically, various series of eight views were produced; in some cases, such as in the Eight Views of Xiaoxiang multiple series, a whole artistic tradition was developed, with a number of artists doing versions of the series. Series of eight views typically appeared in poetry and paintings in the olden times; and now, they may appear in local governments' advertisements to tourists.

== China ==
- Eight Views of Chang'an (長安八景) or Guanzhong (關中八景), Xi'an, Shaanxi
- Eight Views of Huangshan (黃山八勝), Huangshan, Shandong
- Eight Views of Jinling (金陵八景), Nanjing, Jiangsu
- Eight Views of Jinzhou (金州古八景), Dalian, Liaoning
- Eight Views of Luda (旅大八景), Liaoning
- Eight Views of Luoyang (Chinese: 洛陽八景), Luoyang, Henan
- Eight Views of Ram City (羊城八景), Guangzhou, Guangdong
- Eight Views of Xiaoxiang (Chinese: 瀟湘八景), Hunan, the original "Eight Views" that influenced the others
- Eight Views of Yanjing (鷰京八景), Beijing
- Twelve Views of Bayu (巴渝十二景), Chongqing
- Eighteen Views of Lushan (廬山十八景), Lushan, Jiangsu
- Twenty-Four Views of Yangzhou (揚州二十四景), Jiangsu
- Eight Views of Xin'an (新安八景), Xin'an (today Shenzhen), Guangdong
  - Eight Views of Shenzhen (深圳八景)

== Hong Kong ==
- Eight Views of Hong Kong (香港八景)

== Taiwan ==
- Eight Views of Taiwan (臺灣八景)

== Japan ==
- Eight Views of Omi (近江八景), Shiga
- Eight Views of Lake Biwa (琵琶湖八景), Shiga
- Eight Views of Kanazawa (金沢八景), Kanagawa
- Eight Views of Samani (様似八景), Hokkaido
- New Eight Views of Japan (ja:日本新八景)
- Thirty-Six Views of Mount Fuji, by Hokusai and Hiroshige

== Korea ==
- Eight Views of Korea
- Eight Views of Danyang
- Eight Views of Pyongyang
