= Eight Views of Ōmi =

Scenic views of Ōmi Province, Japan, by Hiroshige

The autumn moon at Ishiyama
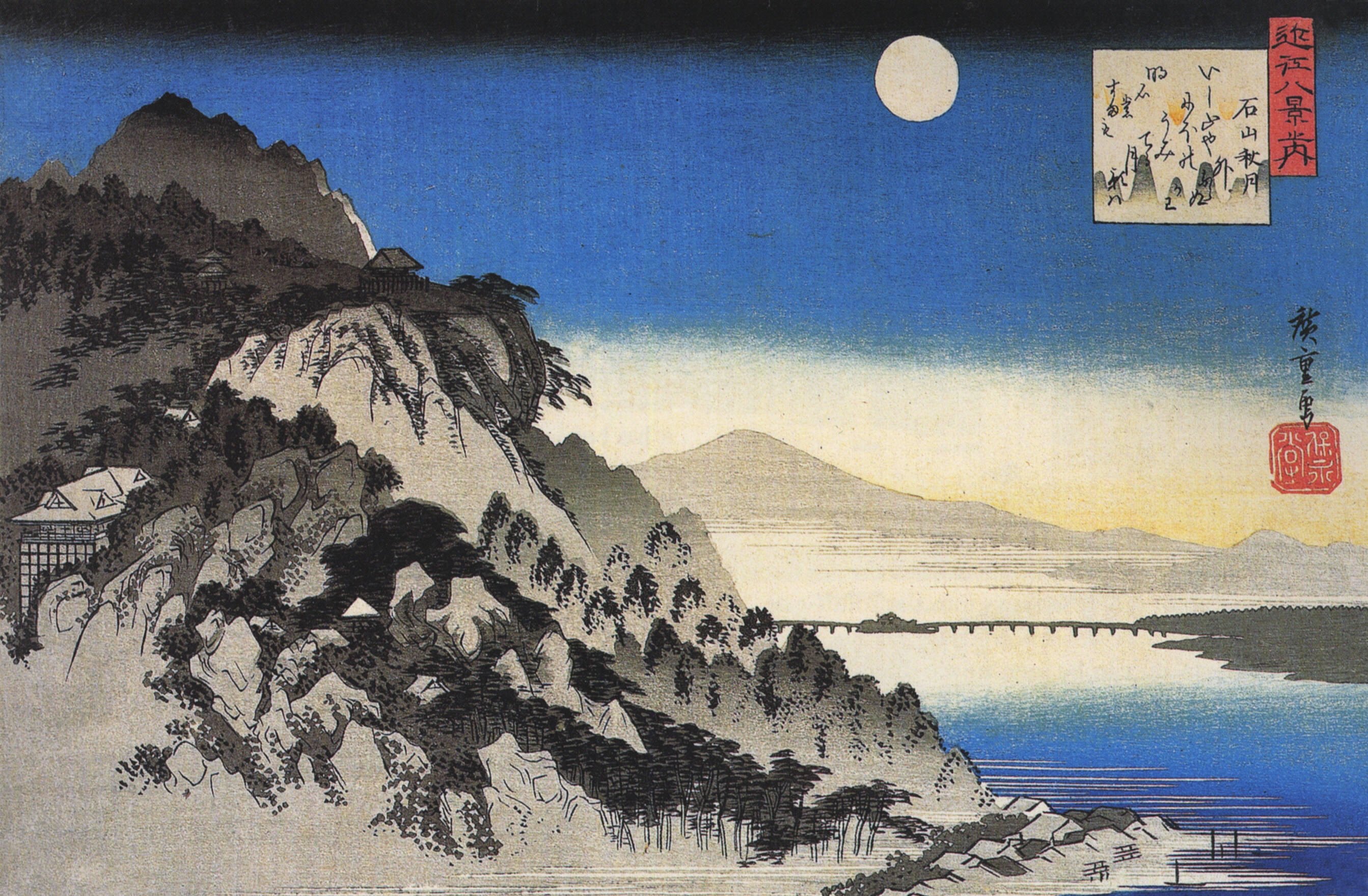
- Artist: Hiroshige

The Eight Views of Ōmi (in Japanese: 近江八景 or Ōmi hakkei) are traditional scenic views of Ōmi Province which is now Shiga Prefecture in Japan.

They were inspired by the Eight Views of Xiaoxiang in China which were first painted in the 11th century and then brought to Japan as a popular theme in the 14–15th centuries. The theme was then used to describe Ōmi province in poetry by Prince Konoe Masaie and his son, Prince Hisamichi, in the 15–16th centuries. The Eight Views of Ōmi then became a popular subject for artists such as Suzuki Harunobu and Utagawa Hiroshige. The theme continued to develop, being transposed to other locations and settings in a process which the Japanese called mitate, such as in Harunobu's Zashiki Hakkei series.

The sights were depicted by Hiroshige in several different series of ukiyo-e pictures, as well as other artists.

They are sometimes erroneously called "Eight Views of Lake Biwa", but the latter were defined to include different locations in 1949 by the government of Shiga Prefecture. The eight themes remain unchanged from the Chinese series: Returning sails, descending geese, autumn moon, evening bells, evening glow, evening snow, evening rain, and clearing weather.

== The Eight Views ==
All views are situated at the southern end of Lake Biwa. There is no fixed order. The following list circles the lake, beginning on the east side.

- Returning sails at Yabase (Yabase no kihan 矢橋帰帆). Yabase is an old harbor on the east side of the lake. Near the Tōkaidō, it was used as a shortcut to Ōtsu by boat. In the early Meiji era steamers appeared, until the railway began its service.
- Evening glow at Seta (Seta no sekishō 瀬田夕照) – The Chinese Bridge at Seta. The long bridge across the Seta River was used by the Tōkaidō. Nowadays is there a bridge in the old Chinese style, a concrete construction, but nice to walk over. (Road traffic uses a new bridges to the north). In the background is the "Fuji of Ōmi" Mount Mikami. It is just above 400 meters tall, but indeed well visible.
- Autumn moon at Ishiyama (Ishiyama no shūgetsu 石山秋月) – Ishiyama Temple. The Ishiyama-dera was located on a hillside next to the Seta River. It got his name from the strange rocks on which it is built, partly on supporting beams. A hut at the upper end of the site allows a view of the lake and of the moon.
- Clear breeze at Awazu (Awazu no seiran 粟津晴嵐) – Awazuhara. Awazu is well known for its pine wood, Awazu-ga-hara. In some pictures the Zeze Castle can be seen. It was dismantled in the Meiji era.
- Evening bell at Miidera (Mii no banshō 三井晩鐘) – Mii-dera. Miidera temple was built in the 8th century. Its bell is one of the "Three bells of Japan", the other two being those at Byōdō-in, Uji and at Jingo-ji, Kyoto.
- Evening rain at Karasaki (Karasaki no yau 唐崎夜雨) – Karasaki Shrine. Karasaki is a small cape with a single large pine tree, a hitsu-matsu. The pine has been replaced several times since Hiroshige's era.
- Wild geese returning home at Katata (Katata no rakugan 堅田落雁) – Ukimido. Alighting geese cannot be seen always, however the little temple near Katata in the square hōkyō-style, detached from the lakeside, connected by a bridge. The first part of the name uki is the same as in Ukiyo-e, meaning floating. Midō means temple.
- Evening snow at Hira (Hira no bosetsu 比良暮雪) – Hira Mountains. The Hira Mountains on the west side of the lake experience the hard winter, when the winter monsoon brings much snow from the continent.

== Other Eight views ==
Hiroshige alone produced nearly 20 different series "Omi hakkei". Other artists followed. To please everybody, "Eight views of" were created for many parts of Japan, e.g. using surroundings of Edo. A series called "Eight views of Kanazawa" reflects a bay near Yokohama.

== From the Eight Views of Ōmi by Harunobu (c. 1760) ==
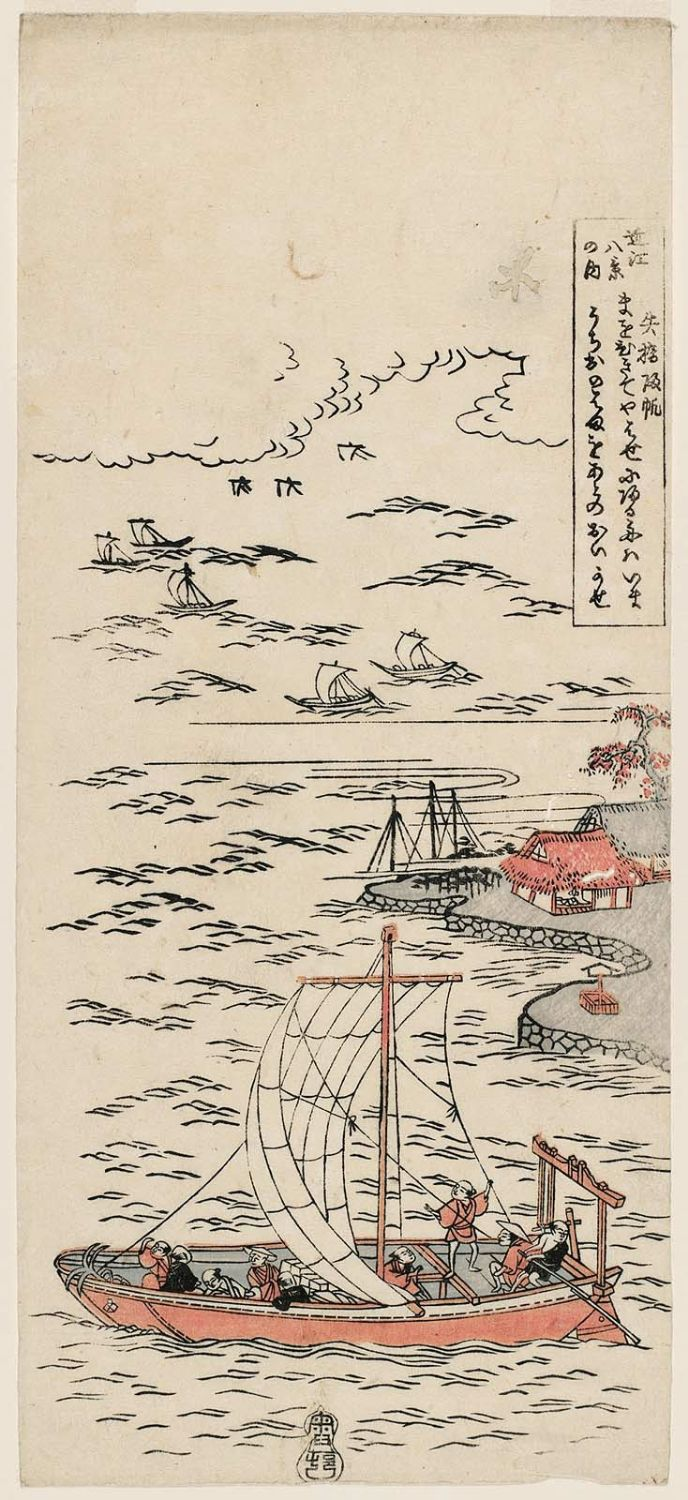
Yabase (矢橋帰帆)

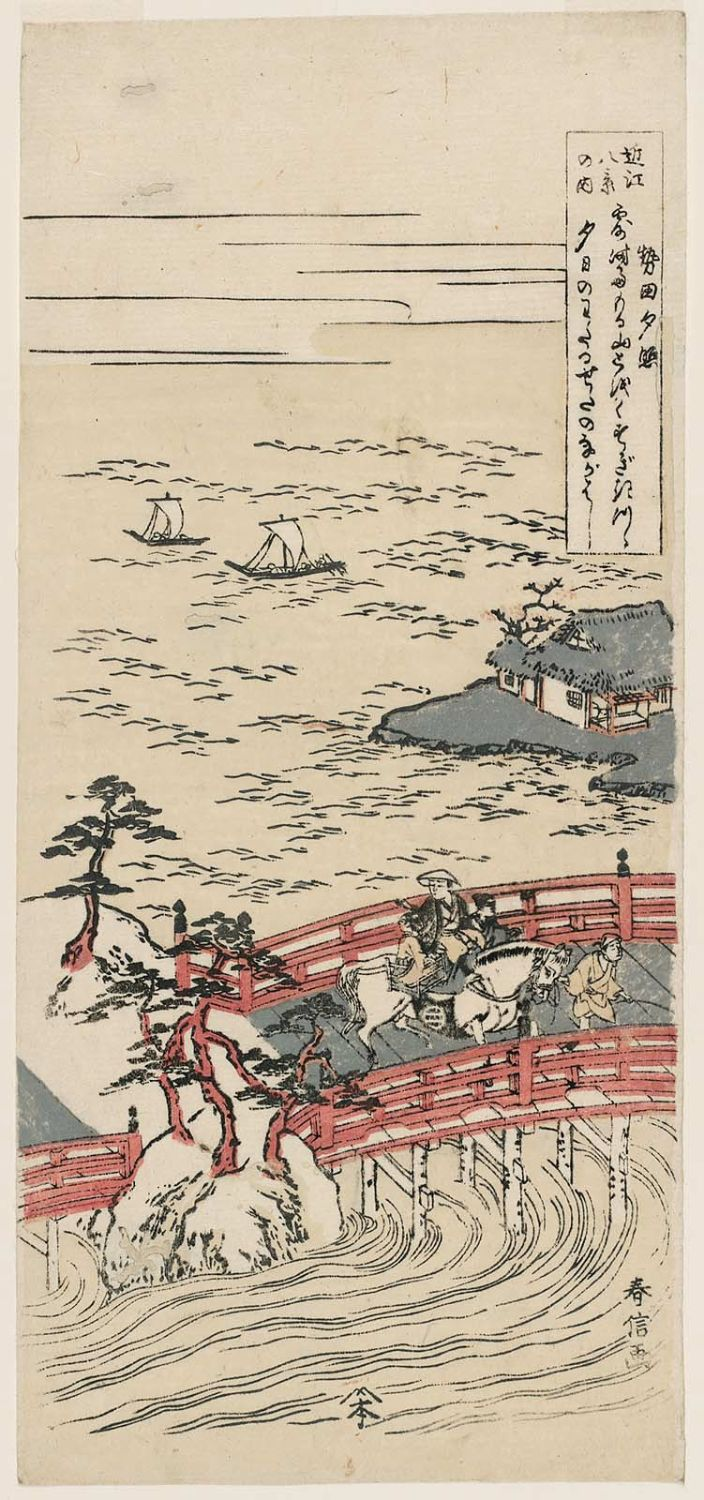
Seta (勢多夕照)

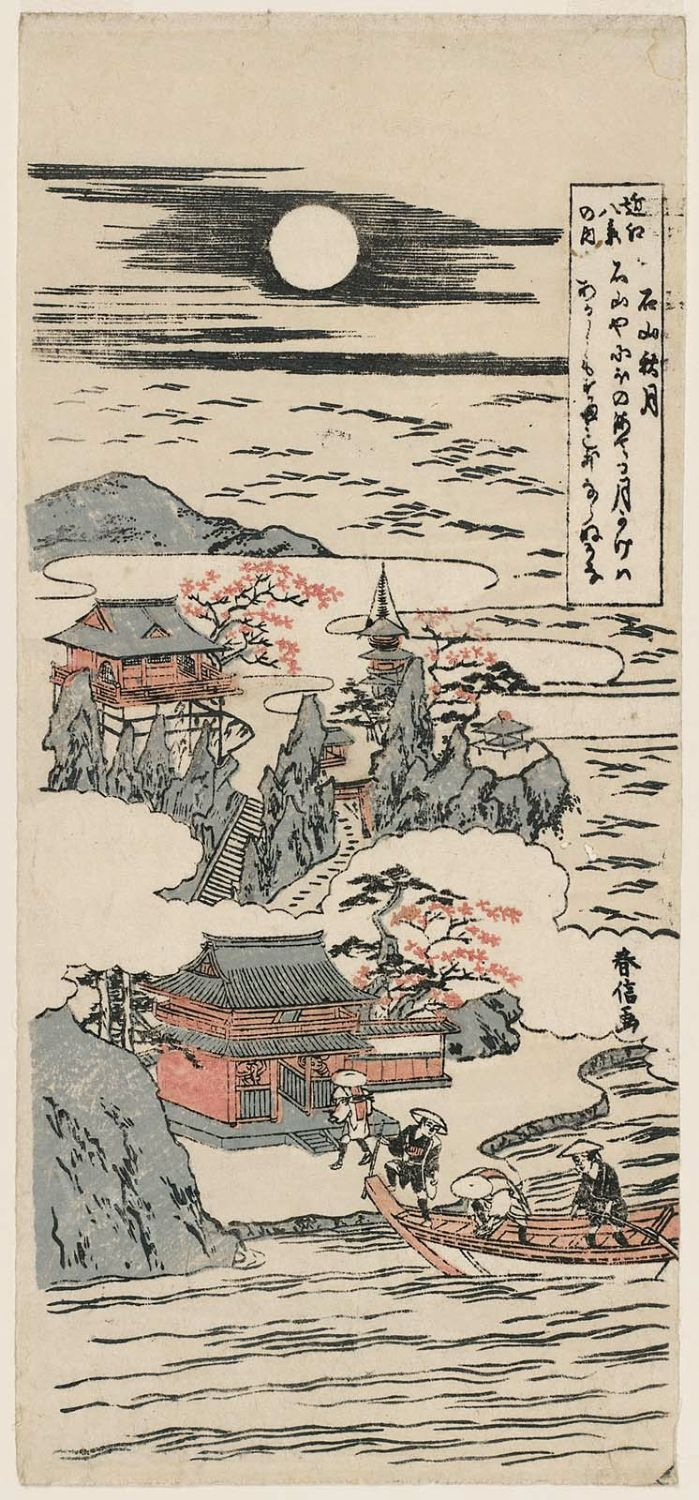
Ishiyama (石山秋月)

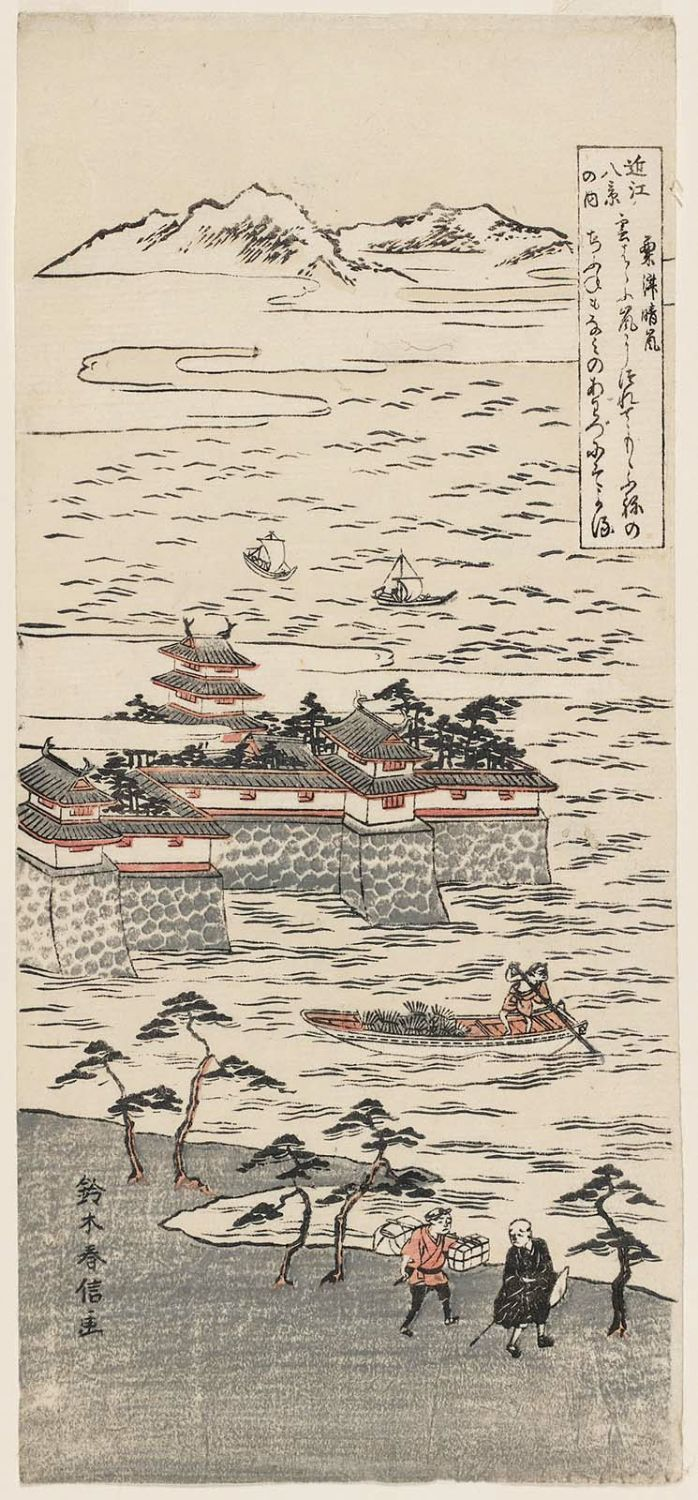
Awazu (粟津晴嵐)

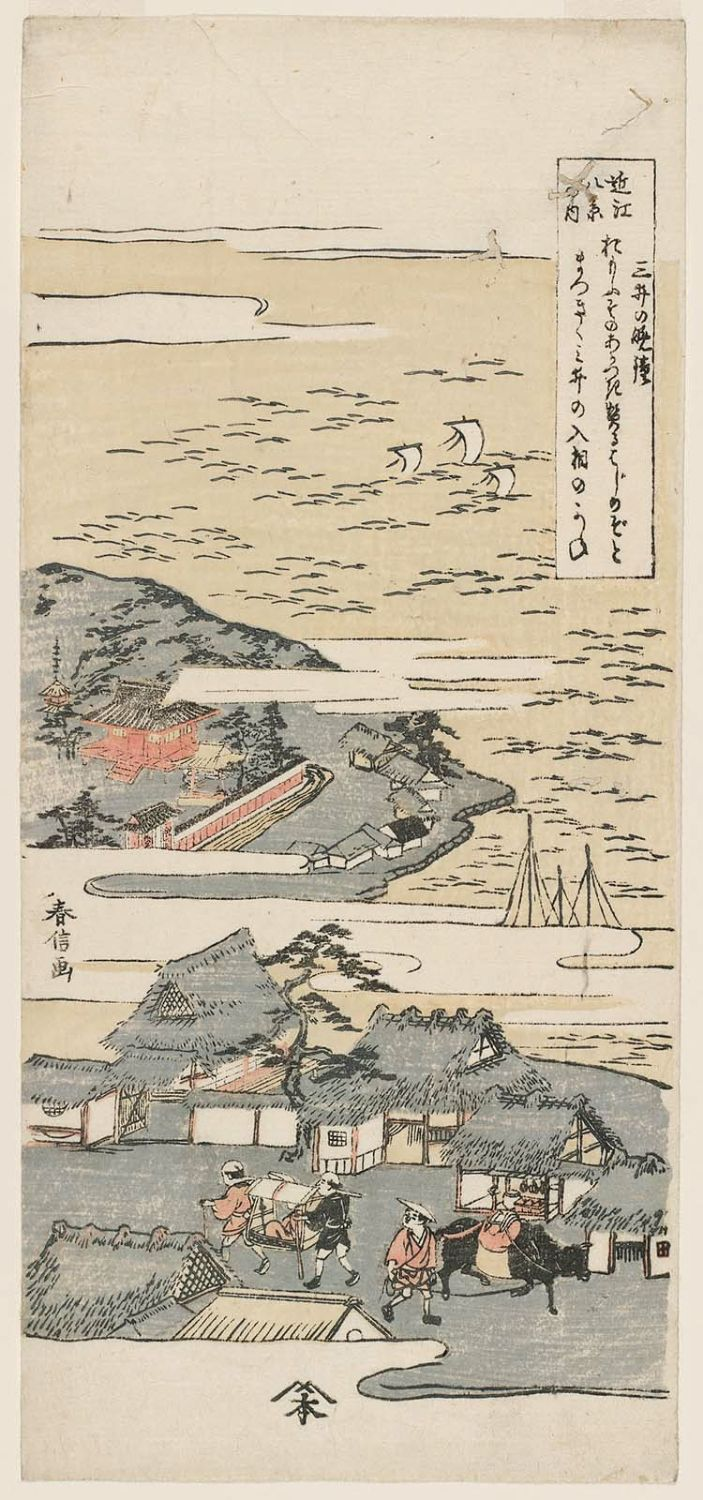
Mii Temple (三井晩鐘)

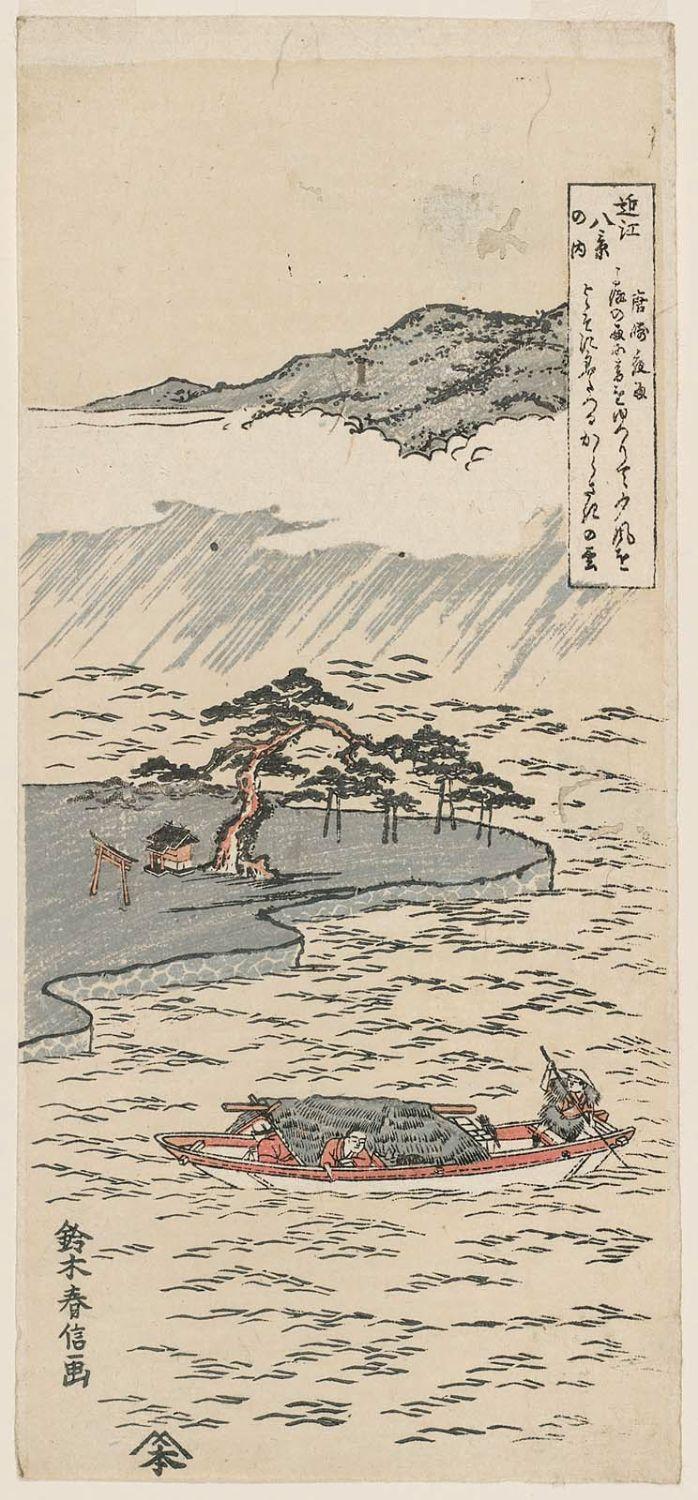
Karasaki (唐崎夜雨)

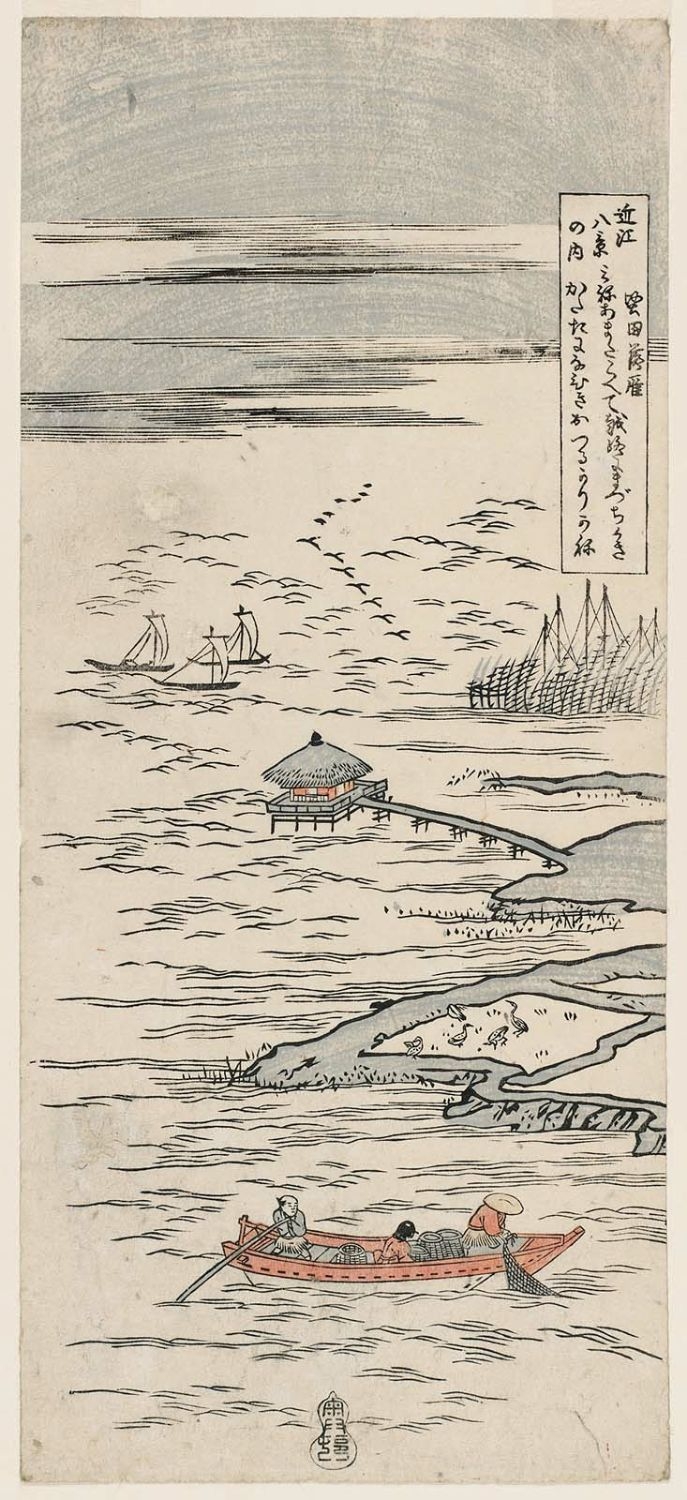
Katata (堅田落雁)

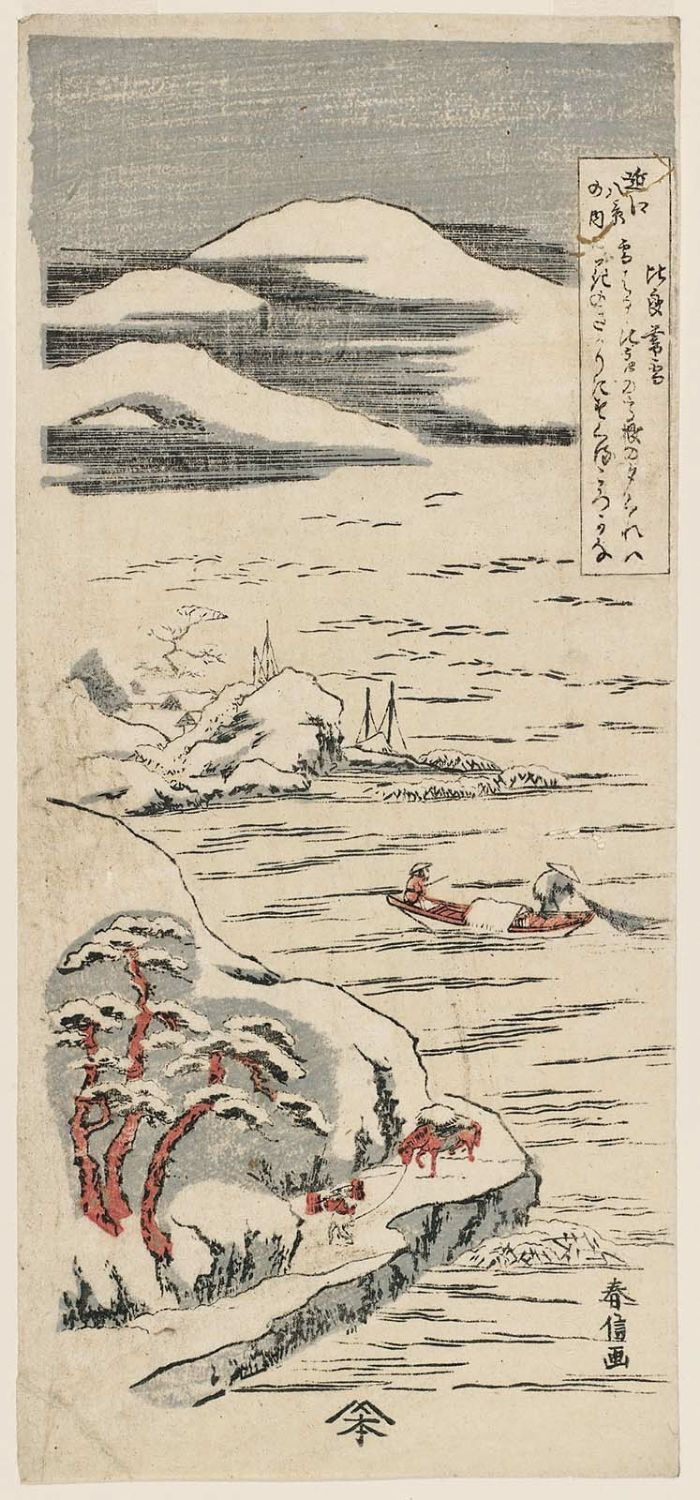
Hira Mountains (比良暮雪)

== Ukiyoe pictures by Hiroshige ==
Hiroshige designed the following ukiyo-e pictures:

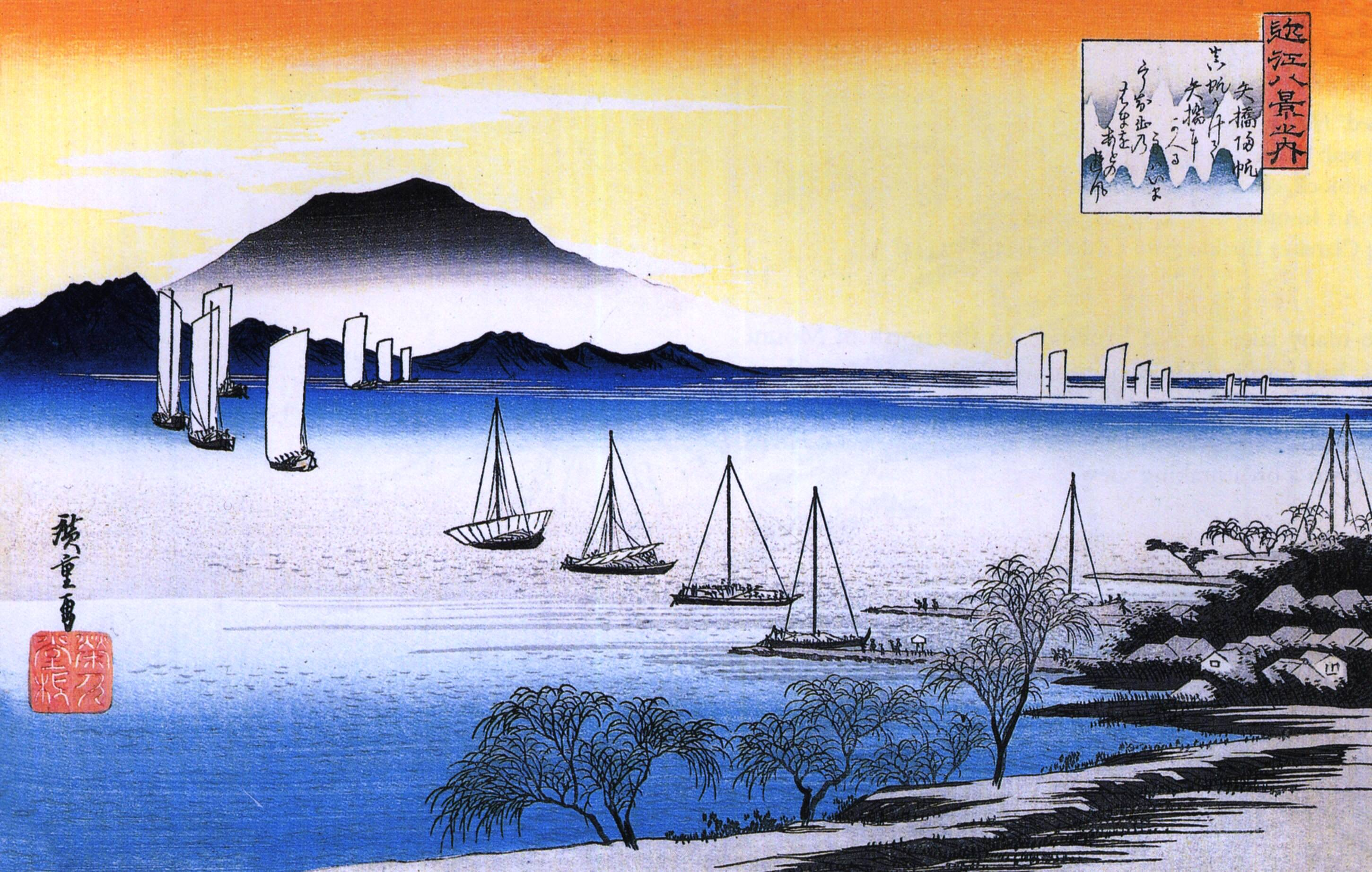
Yabase (矢橋帰帆)

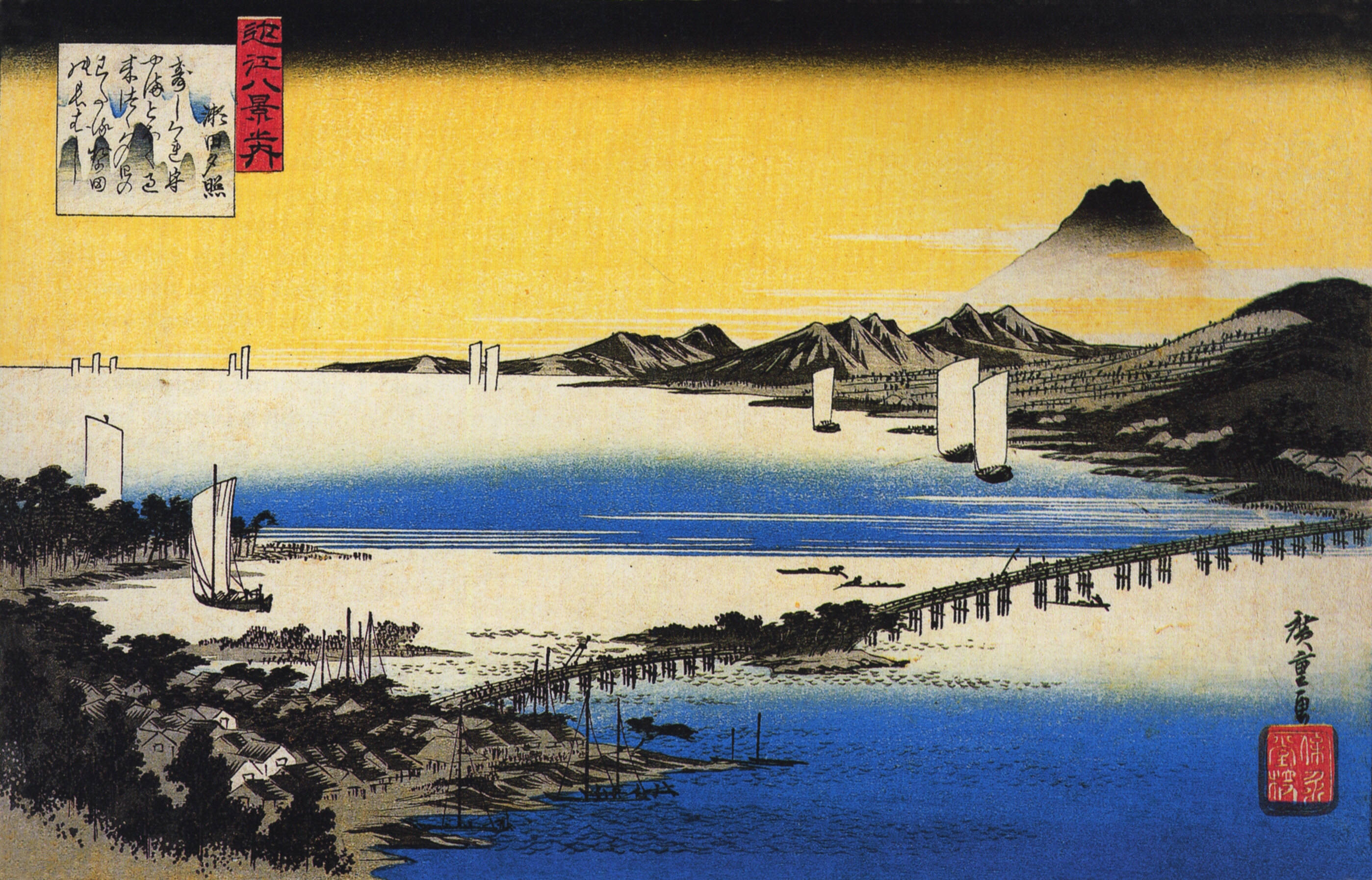
Seta (勢多夕照)

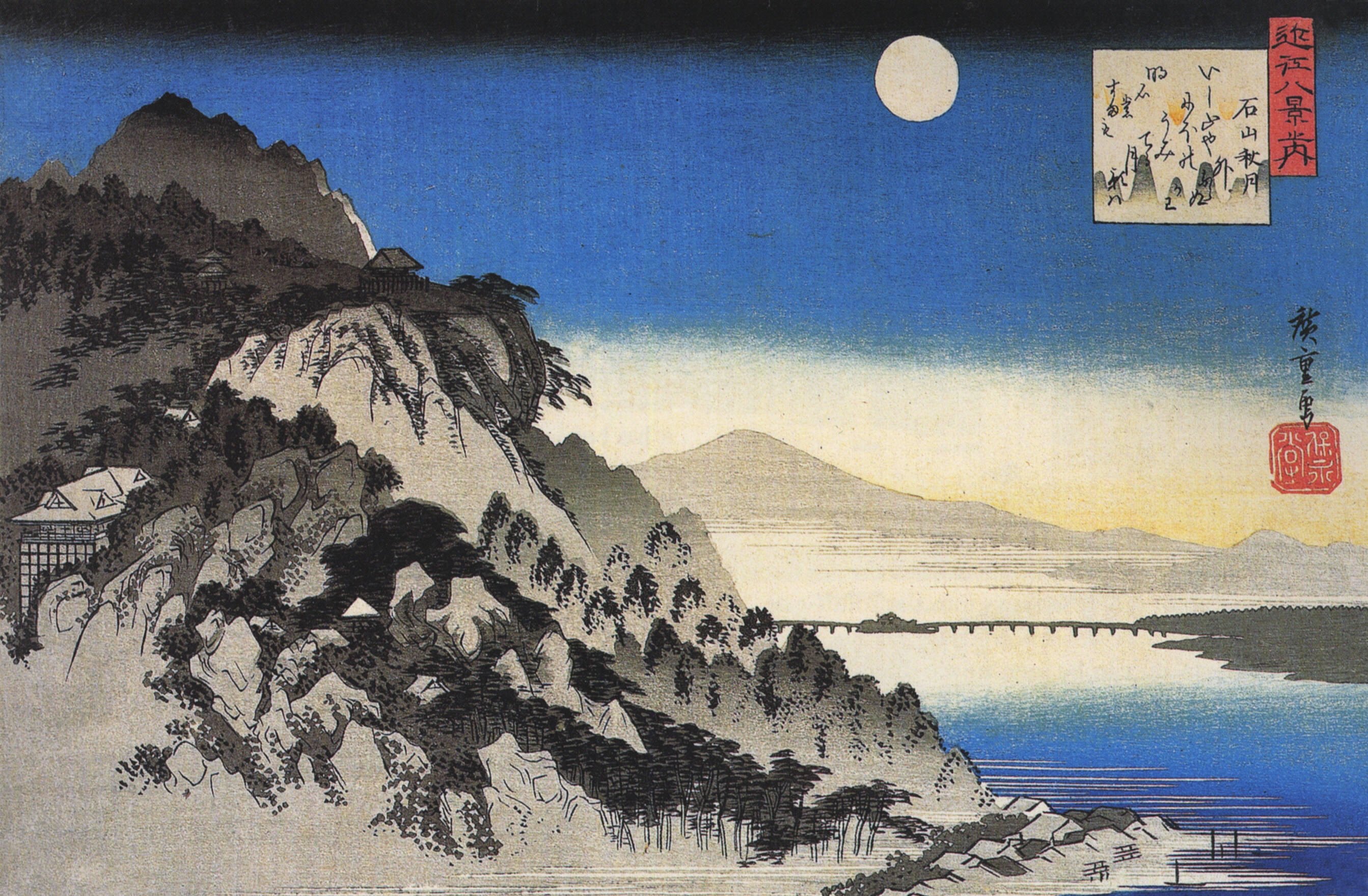
Ishiyama (石山秋月)

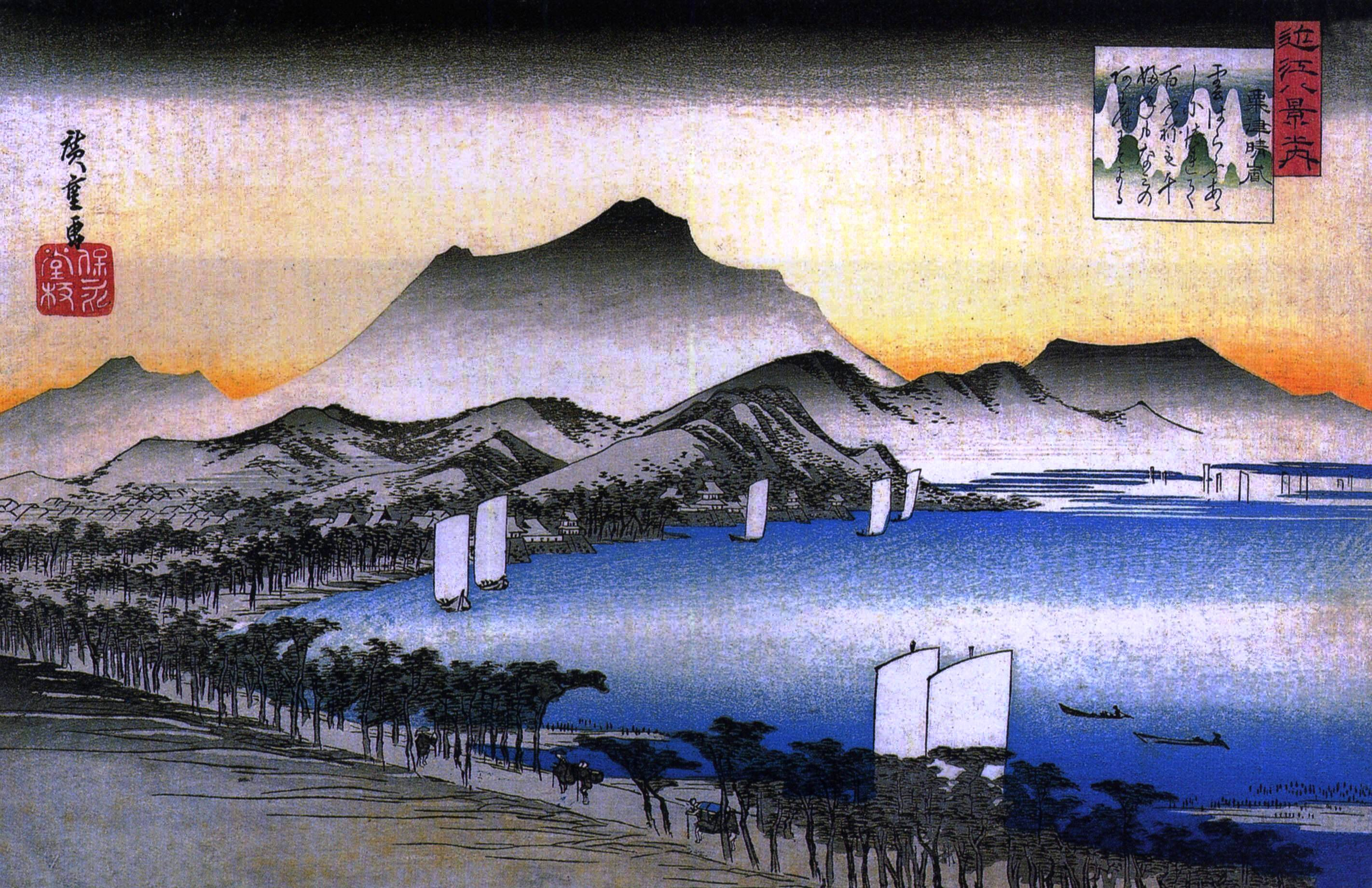
Awazu (粟津晴嵐)

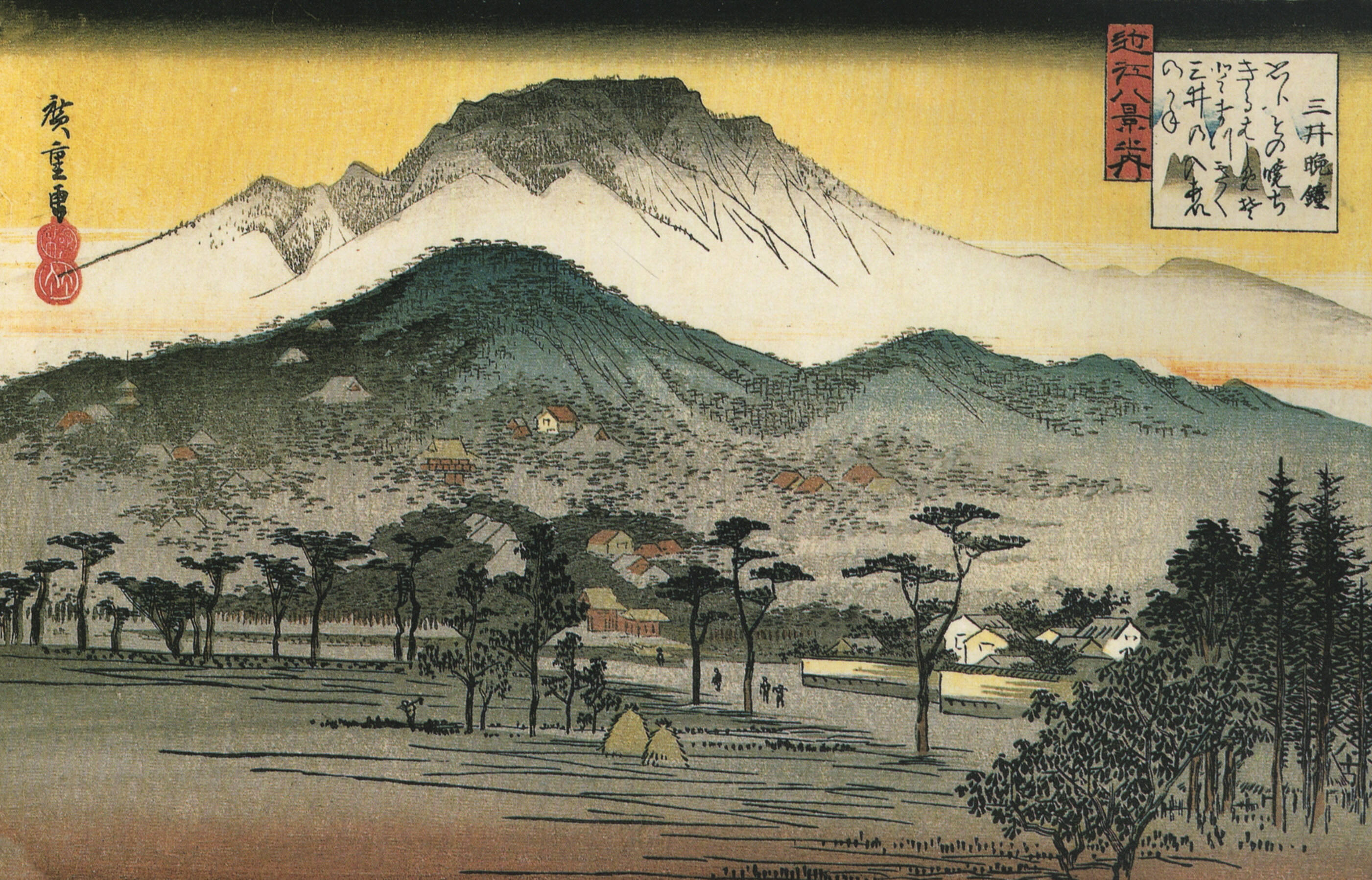
Mii Temple (三井晩鐘)

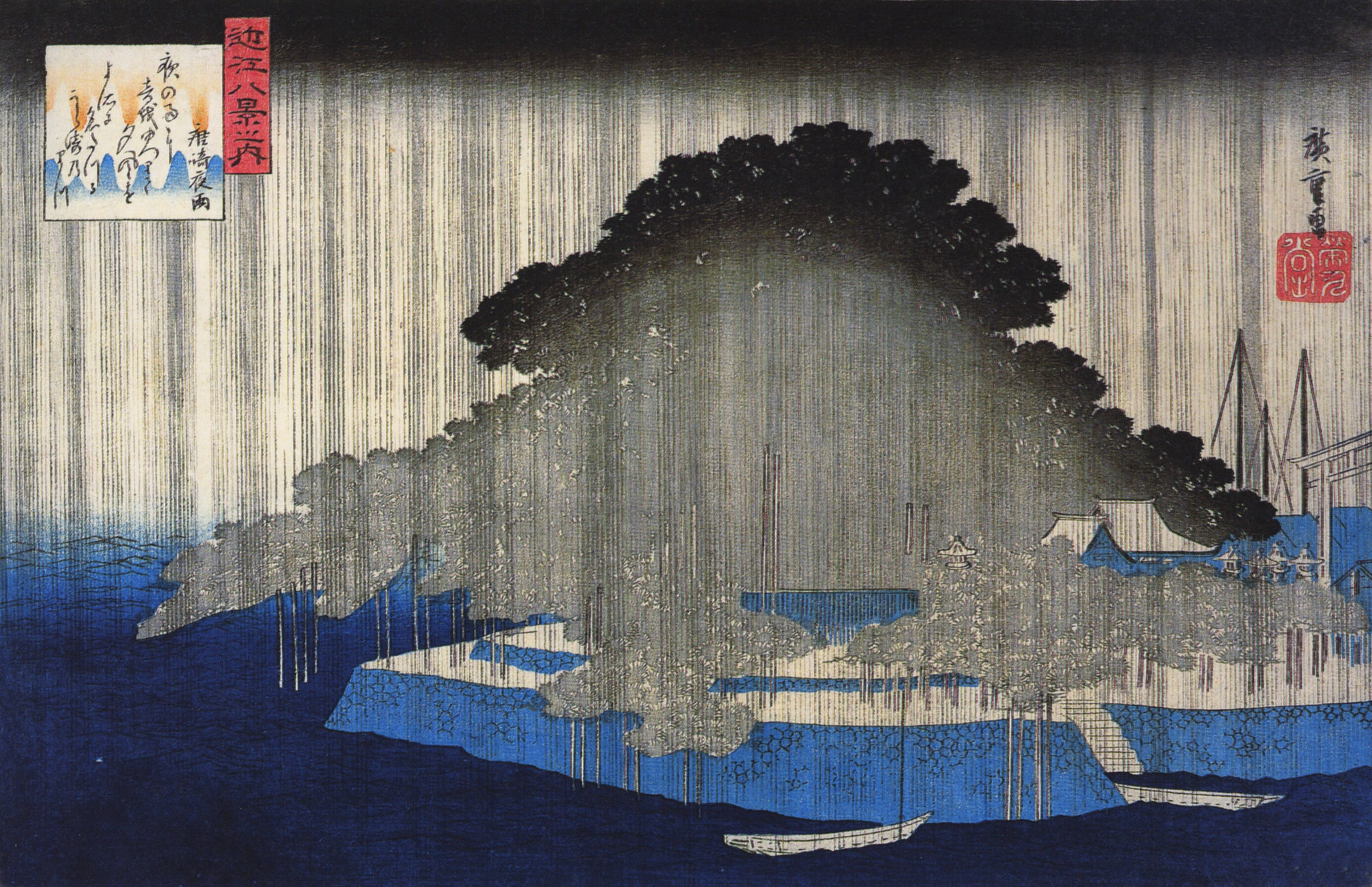
Karasaki (唐崎夜雨)

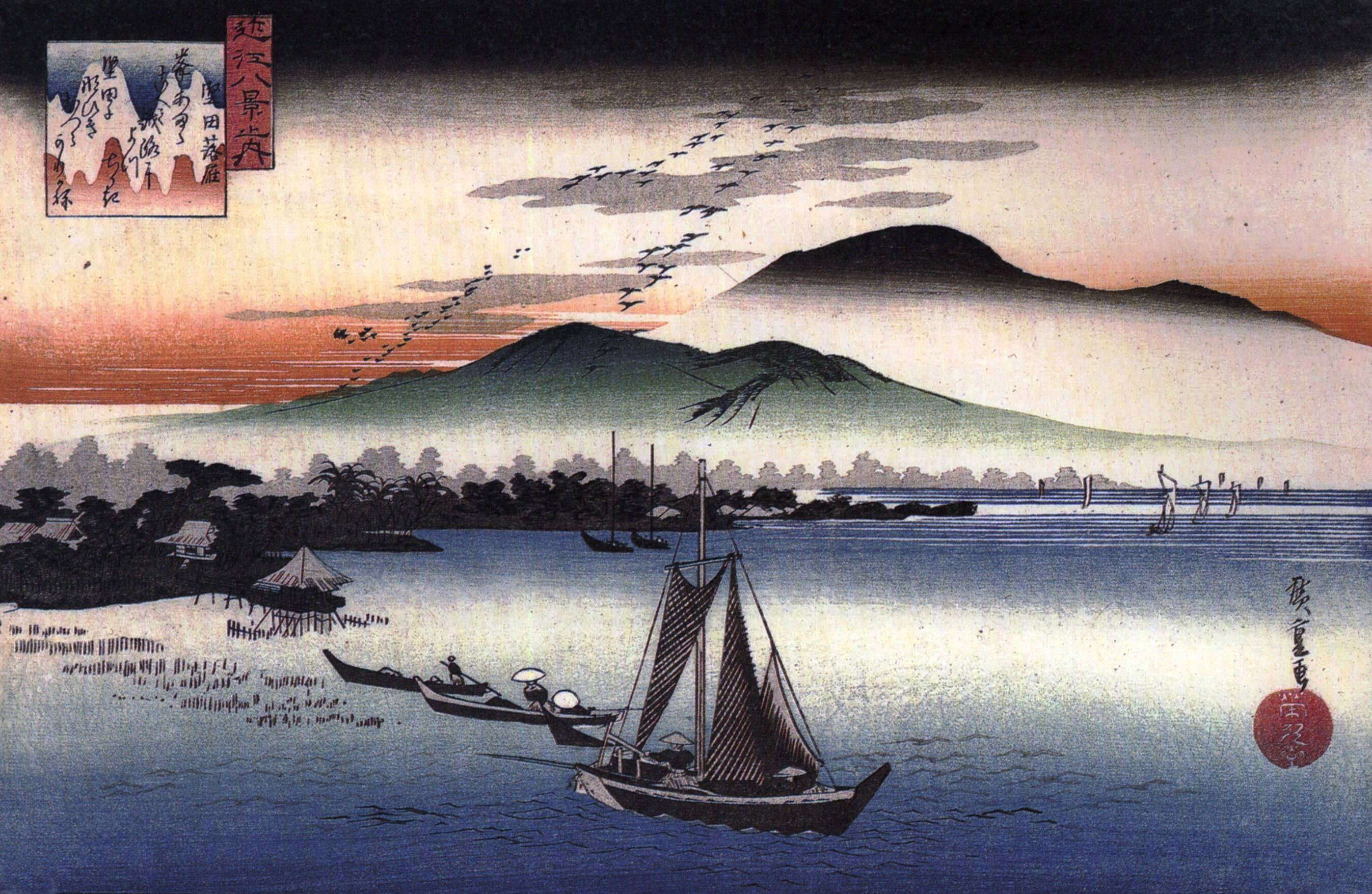
Katata (堅田落雁)

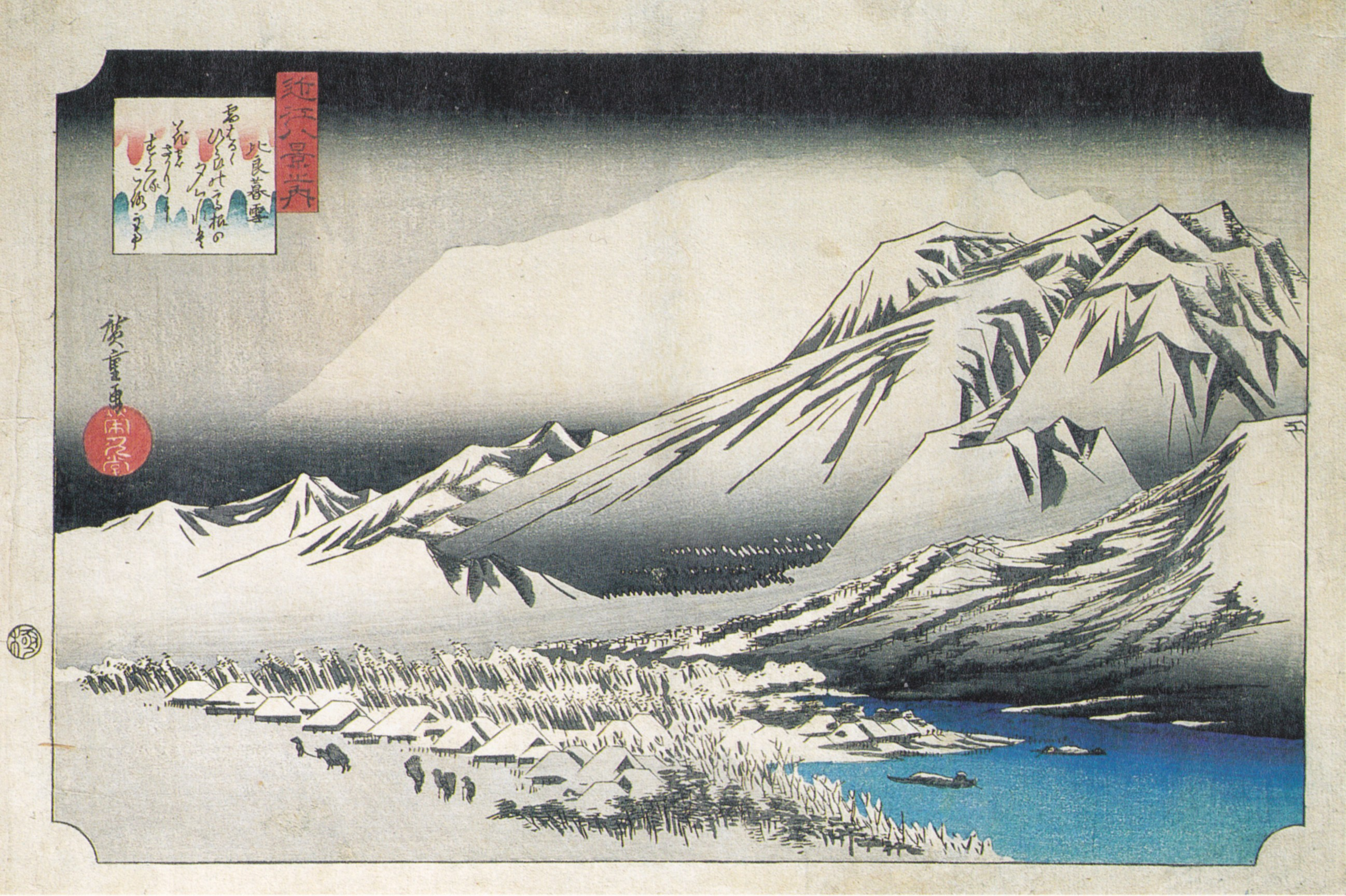
Hira Mountains (比良暮雪)

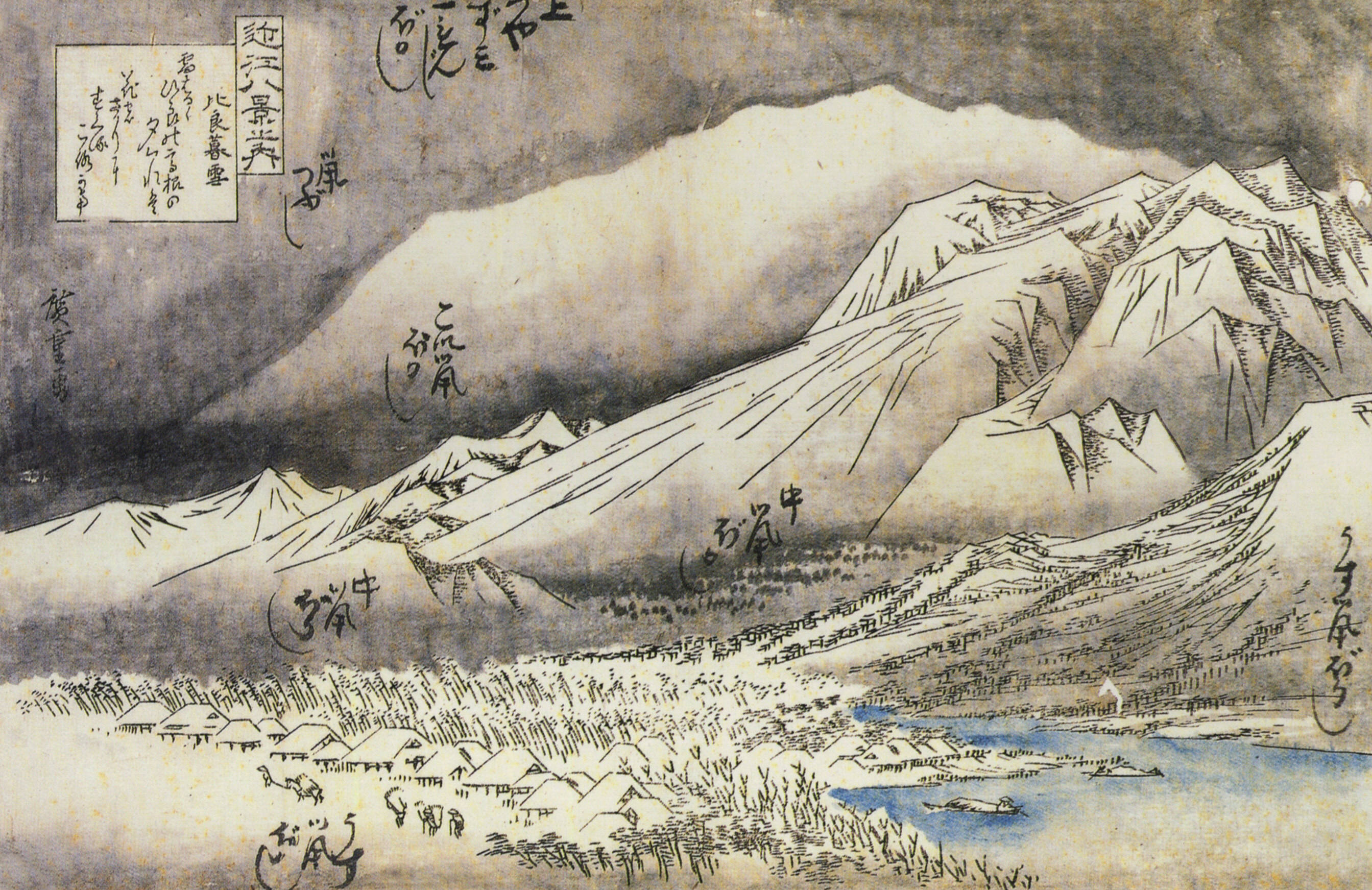
Hira Mountains (A predrawing by Hiroshige)

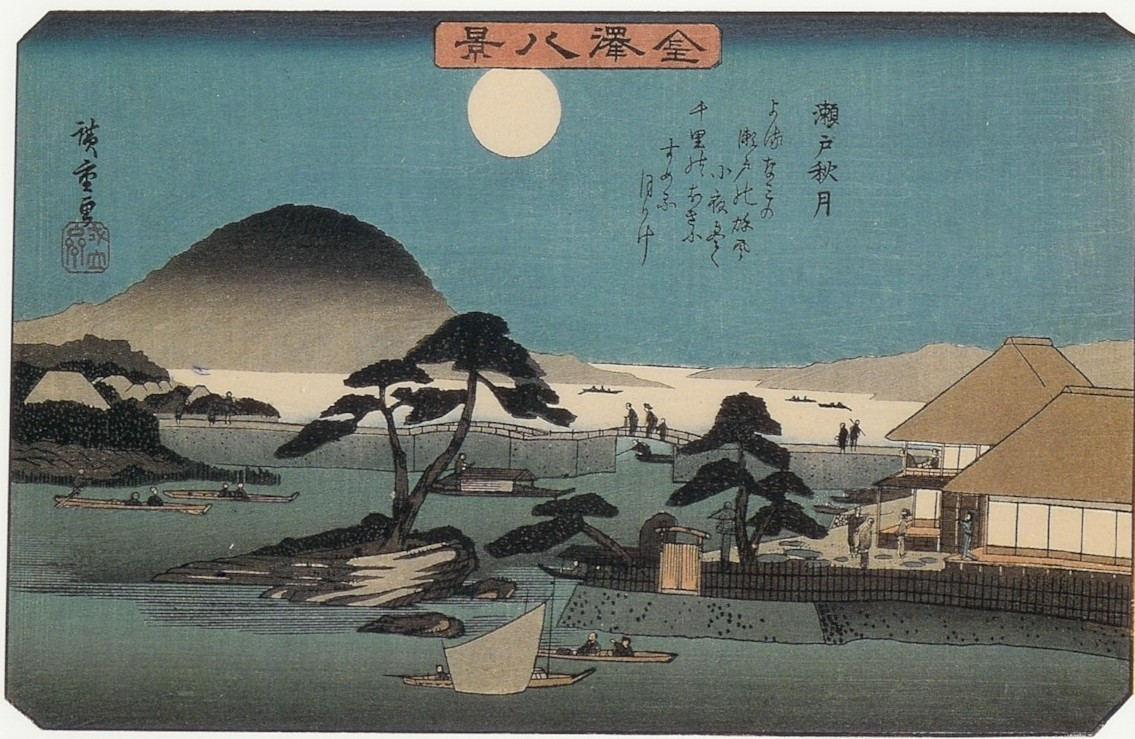
Full moon in Hiroshiges Kanazawa series

== See also ==
- Eight Views
- Eight Views of Xiaoxiang
- Eight Views of Taiwan
- Eight Views of Jinzhou (Dalian)
- Eight Views of Lushun South Road, Dalian
- Eight Views of Korea
- Thirty-six Views of Mount Fuji, by Hokusai and Hiroshige
