= Eight Views of Korea =

List of places considered to define Korea's beauty

The Eight Views of Korea are a collection of places that are considered to capture the beauty of Korea. The concept of Eight Views is shared across East Asia, with the example of the Eight Views of Xiaoxiang during the Song dynasty of China.

== List ==
The Eight Views of Korea are a collection of the beautiful scenery of Korea, that are now understood to be as follows:

- Mount Kumgang (금강산, 金剛山)
- Hallasan (한라산, 漢拏山)
- Seokguram (석굴암, 石窟庵)
- Haeundae (해운대, 海雲臺)
- Pujon Highland (부전고원, 赴戰高原)
- Pyongyang (평양, 平壤)
- Baekdu Mountain (백두산, 白頭山)
- Yalu River (압록강, 鴨緑江)

These Eight Views were sung in a popular song called "the Song of the Eight Views of Korea".

== See also ==
- Eight Views of Danyang
- Eight Views of Pyongyang
