= Lanshan County =

Lanshan County 蓝山县
- County
- Location of the seat in Hunan
- Coordinates: 25°22′16″N 112°11′49″E
- Country: People's Republic of China
- Province: Hunan
- Prefecture-level city: Yongzhou
- County seat: Tafeng Town

Area
  - Total: 1,807.04 km^{2} (697.70 sq mi)

Population (2010)
  - Total: 332,940
  - Density: 184.25/km^{2} (477.20/sq mi)
- Time zone: UTC+8 (China Standard)
- Postal code: 4258XX
- Languages: Xiangnan Tuhua, Standard Chinese

Lanshan County (simplified Chinese: 蓝山县; traditional Chinese: 藍山縣; pinyin: Lánshān Xiàn) is a county of Hunan Province, China. It is under the administration of Yongzhou prefecture-level City.

Located on the south margin of the province, it is adjacent to the northern border of Guangdong. Lanshan covers 1,806 km^{2} (697 sq mi). In 2015, it had a registered population of 400,200 and a permanent resident population of 339,100. The county has eight towns and six ethnic townships of Yao people under its jurisdiction. The county seat and the largest town is Tafeng (塔峰镇).

== Geography and climate ==
Lanshan is a mountainous county located in the east of Jiuyi Mountains on the northern side of the middle Nanling Range. The county is bordered to the southwest by Jianghua County, to the northwest by Ningyuan County, to the northeast by Jiahe County, to the east by Linwu County, to the southeast by Lianzhou City of Guangdong. It covers 1,806 km^{2} (697 sq mi), the county is 67 square kilometres (26 sq mi) north to south with 55 square kilometres (21 sq mi) west to east.

Lanshan has a humid subtropical monsoon climate with an annual average temperature of 18.0 °C (64.4 °F), annual rainfall of 1,581 mm (62.2 in). There are 69 rivers with drainage area of more than 10 square kilometers or length of more than 5 kilometers, most rivers belong to the Yangtze River system, less to the Pearl River system. The county is the source place of the Xiang River, originating from Yegou Mountain (野狗岭) in Zhulin Village (竹林村) of Xiangjiangyuan Town.

Climate data for Lanshan, elevation 277 m (909 ft), (1991–2020 normals, extremes 1981–2010)
Month	Jan	Feb	Mar	Apr	May	Jun	Jul	Aug	Sep	Oct	Nov	Dec	Year
Record high °C (°F)	25.9 (78.6)	29.0 (84.2)	33.8 (92.8)	33.9 (93.0)	35.8 (96.4)	37.0 (98.6)	39.0 (102.2)	38.8 (101.8)	36.3 (97.3)	35.2 (95.4)	33.4 (92.1)	26.9 (80.4)	39.0 (102.2)
Mean daily maximum °C (°F)	10.7 (51.3)	13.8 (56.8)	17.5 (63.5)	23.8 (74.8)	27.8 (82.0)	30.6 (87.1)	33.2 (91.8)	32.4 (90.3)	29.0 (84.2)	24.4 (75.9)	19.4 (66.9)	13.5 (56.3)	23.0 (73.4)
Daily mean °C (°F)	6.9 (44.4)	9.6 (49.3)	13.4 (56.1)	19.3 (66.7)	23.4 (74.1)	26.5 (79.7)	28.6 (83.5)	27.5 (81.5)	24.3 (75.7)	19.5 (67.1)	14.3 (57.7)	8.9 (48.0)	18.5 (65.3)
Mean daily minimum °C (°F)	4.3 (39.7)	6.8 (44.2)	10.4 (50.7)	15.9 (60.6)	20.1 (68.2)	23.4 (74.1)	25.1 (77.2)	24.1 (75.4)	21.1 (70.0)	16.1 (61.0)	10.8 (51.4)	5.6 (42.1)	15.3 (59.6)
Record low °C (°F)	−4.0 (24.8)	−2.9 (26.8)	−1.1 (30.0)	3.0 (37.4)	9.9 (49.8)	13.4 (56.1)	17.8 (64.0)	19.1 (66.4)	11.5 (52.7)	3.3 (37.9)	−2.1 (28.2)	−6.5 (20.3)	−6.5 (20.3)
Average precipitation mm (inches)	81.5 (3.21)	87.5 (3.44)	158.4 (6.24)	183.9 (7.24)	215.4 (8.48)	246.5 (9.70)	148.0 (5.83)	195.3 (7.69)	94.8 (3.73)	75.9 (2.99)	84.3 (3.32)	60.3 (2.37)	1,631.8 (64.24)
Average precipitation days (≥ 0.1 mm)	15.7	14.9	19.7	17.3	18.5	18.7	13.9	16.8	12.5	10.6	10.9	11.9	181.4
Average snowy days	3.0	1.3	0.3	0	0	0	0	0	0	0	0.1	0.8	5.5
Average relative humidity (%)	82	82	83	80	80	79	73	78	80	79	79	78	79
Mean monthly sunshine hours	55.8	55.8	60.8	89.4	105.0	109.2	190.4	163.5	126.0	114.6	105.7	89.7	1,265.9
Percentage possible sunshine	17	17	16	23	25	27	46	41	35	32	33	27	28
Source: China Meteorological Administration

== Administrative divisions ==
8 towns

- Citangxu (祠堂圩镇)
- Maojun (毛俊镇)
- Nanshi (楠市镇)
- Suocheng (所城镇)
- Tafeng (塔峰镇)
- Taipingxu (太平圩镇)
- Tushi (土市镇)
- Xinyu (新圩镇)

6 Yao ethnic townships

- Daqiao (大桥瑶族乡)
- Huiyuan (汇源瑶族乡)
- Jiangdong (浆洞瑶族乡)
- Jingzhu (荆竹瑶族乡)
- Litou (犁头瑶族乡)
- Xiangjiangyuan (湘江源瑶族乡)

== Transportation ==
The G55 Expressway runs through the middle land north to south, the G76 Expressway passes through the north of the county west to east, they meet at Citangyu Town (祠堂圩镇) in the north. the two national expressways and the other three Hunan Provincial Highway of S216, S322 and S324 form the main road network connecting the county.
