= Daqiao Yao Ethnic Township =

Daqiao Yao Ethnic Township 大桥瑶族乡
- Ethnic township
- Location in Hunan
- Coordinates: 25°6′50″N 112°7′11″E
- Country: People's Republic of China
- Province: Hunan
- Prefecture-level city: Yongzhou
- County: Lanshan County
- Village-level divisions: 7 villages
- Time zone: China Standard

Daqiao Yao Ethnic Township (simplified Chinese: 大桥瑶族乡; traditional Chinese: 大橋瑶族鄉; pinyin: Dàqiáo Yáo Zú Xiāng; lit. 'great or large bridge') is an ethnic township for Yao people under the administration of Lanshan County in southern Hunan province, China. As of 2018, it has 7 villages under its administration.

== See also ==
- List of township-level divisions of Hunan
