= Xiangjiangyuan =

Xiangjiangyuan 湘江源瑶族乡
- Ethnic township
- Location in Hunan
- Coordinates: 25°13′31″N 112°06′16″E
- Country: People's Republic of China
- Province: Hunan
- Prefecture-level city: Yongzhou
- County: Lanshan

Area
  - Total: 149 km^{2} (58 sq mi)

Population (2015)
  - Total: 3,188
  - Density: 21.4/km^{2} (55.4/sq mi)
- Time zone: UTC+8 (China Standard)
- Postal code: 4258xx
- Languages: Xiangnan Tuhua, Standard Chinese

Xiangjiangyuan Yao Township (simplified Chinese: 湘江源瑶族乡; traditional Chinese: 湘江源瑤族鄉; pinyin: Xiāngjiāngyuán Yáozú Xiāng; lit. 'Xiang River source') is an ethnic township of the Yao people in Lanshan County, Hunan, China. It is the home of the Yao people and is named after the source of the Xiang River. The township covers an area of 149 square kilometres (58 sq mi). At the end of 2015, it had 742 resident families with a population of 3,188; the Yao people account for 95 percent of the population. The township is divided into five villages and part of the Jingzhu Forest Farm (荆竹林场). The seat of the township is at the village of Tongcun (桐村).

== History ==
The Xiangjiangyuan Yao Township historically was named Ziliang Ethnic Township (紫良民族乡), Qunfeng People's Commune (群峰人民公社), Ziliang Yao People's Commune (紫良瑶族人民公社) and Ziliang Yao Township (紫良瑶族乡). The historic Ziliang Ethnic Township was formed in April 1950. It was renamed Qunfeng People's Commune in 1958. The Ziliang Yao People's Commune was reformed in 1961. The people's commune was transformed into a township in 1982. The Ziliang was allowed to renamed Xiangjiangyuan on November 18, 2015. The Xiangjiangyuan Yao Township was officially established on December 30, 2016.

== Geography ==
The Xiangjiangyuan is a mountainous township located in the southeastern margin of Lanshan. It is bordered to the north and northeast by Suocheng Town (所城镇), to the southeast by Daqiao Yao Township (大桥瑶族乡), to the south by Jingzhu Yao Township (荆竹瑶族乡), to the west by Ningyuan County. The township is at 800 metres above sea level, the source of the Xiang River is at Yegou Mountain (野狗岭) in Zhulin Village (竹林村). It is also the location of the Xiangjiangyuan National Forest Park (湘江源国家森林公园), established by the State Forestry Administration in 2008.
