= Xiang River =

River in China

Coordinates: 29°26′N 113°8′E

Xiang
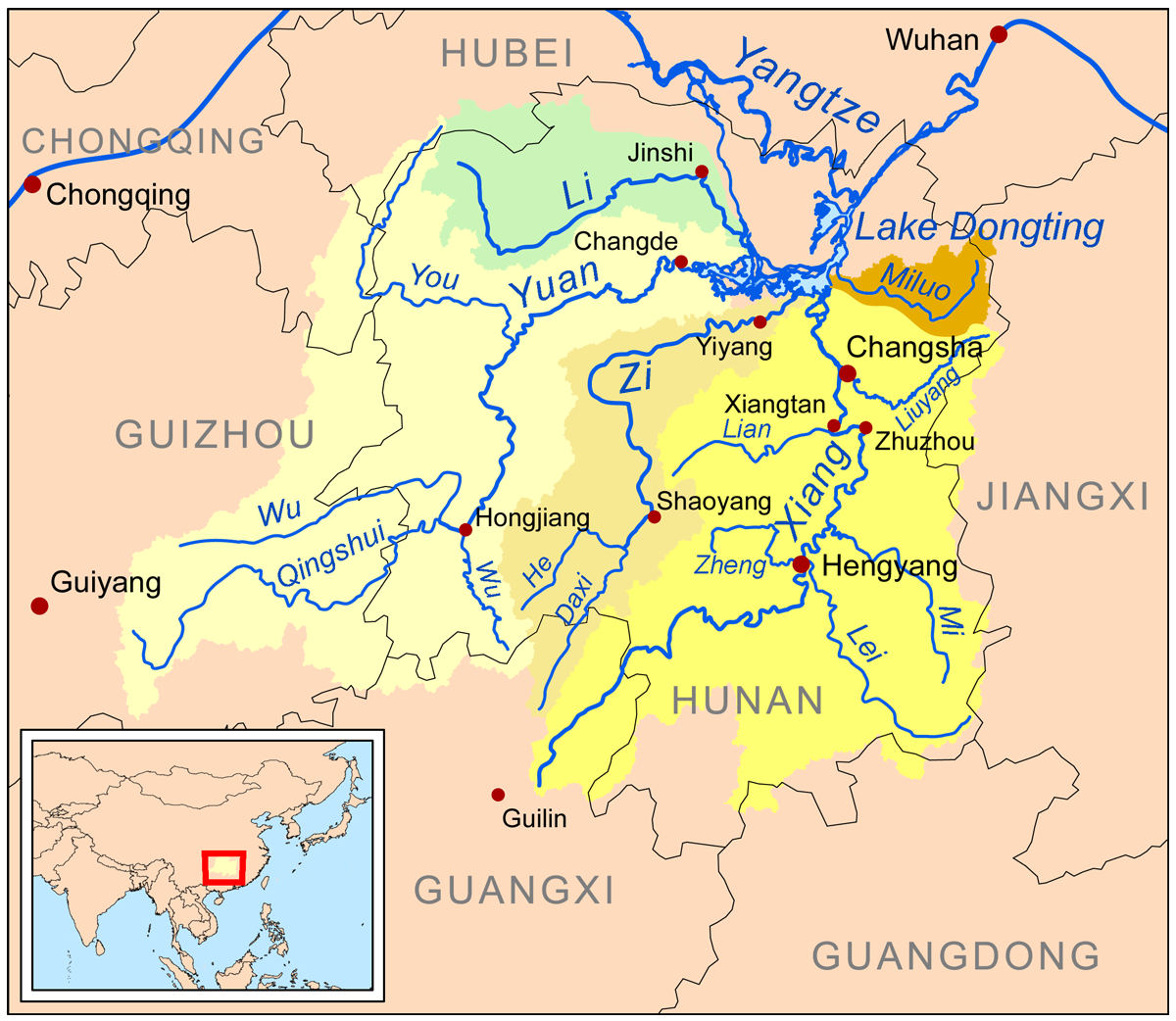
- The Yuan (left) and Xiang (right) basins, draining north to Lake Dongting.
- Chinese: 湘
Transcriptions
Standard Mandarin
- Hanyu Pinyin: Xiāng
- Wade–Giles: Hsiang
- IPA: [ɕjáŋ]
Xiang
- IPA: Siɔ̃^{44}-ziɔ̃^{31} Siɔ̃^{44}-swɛ^{13}
Old Chinese
- Zhengzhang: *Slaŋ

Xiang River
- Chinese: 湘江
Transcriptions
Standard Mandarin
- Hanyu Pinyin: Xiāngjiāng
- Wade–Giles: Hsiang Chiang
- IPA: [ɕjáŋ.tɕjáŋ]

Xiang River
- Chinese: 湘水
Transcriptions
Standard Mandarin
- Hanyu Pinyin: Xiāngshǔi
- Wade–Giles: Hsiang Shui
- IPA: [ɕjáŋ.ʂwèɪ]

The Xiang River is the chief river of the Lake Dongting drainage system of the middle Yangtze, the largest river in Hunan Province, China. It is the second-largest tributary (after the Min River) in terms of surface runoff, the fifth-largest tributary by drainage area of the Yangtze tributaries. The river flows generally northeast through the provinces of Guangxi and Hunan, its tributaries reaching into Jiangxi and Guangdong.

Traditionally, it was regarded that the West (left) Branch is the Main Stream of the Upper Xiang, which rises in the Haiyang Mountains between Xing'an and Lingchuan counties of Guangxi. In the 1st national water census of China in 2011, the East Branch Xiao River, was identified as the Main Stem of the Upper Xiang. The Ping Island of Yongzhou is the meeting of the two streams, the West source originating from Guangxi and the East source of the Xiao River originating from Lanshan County of Hunan.

With the tributaries, the Xiang has a river basin area of 94,721 square kilometres (36,572 sq mi), of which Hunan has an area of 85,383 square kilometres (32,967 sq mi). In a situation of Guangxi source, the Xiang has a length of 844 kilometres (524 mi). In another situation of Xiao River as the main source stream, the Xiang has a length of 948 kilometres (589 mi).

== Geography ==
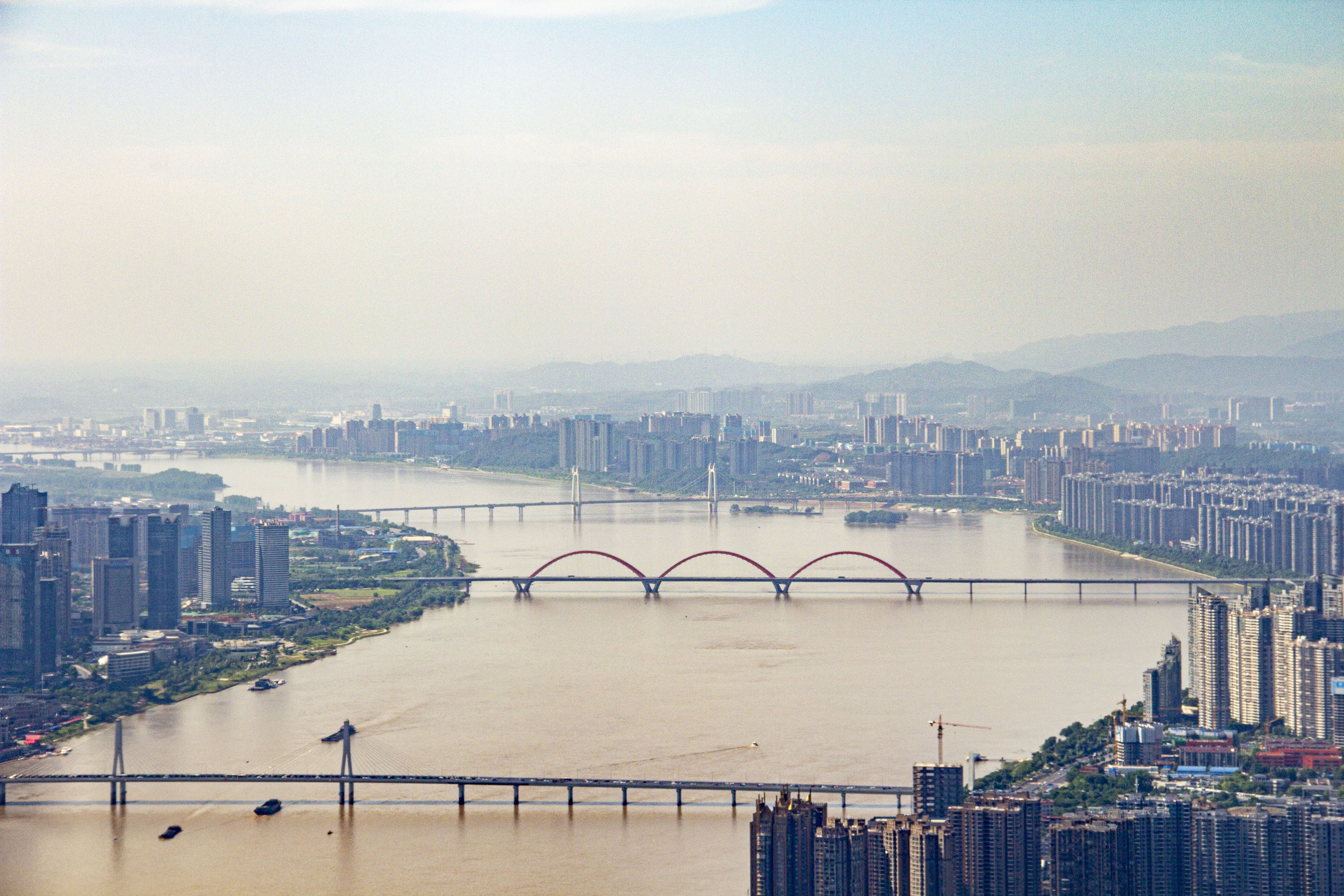
Xiang River in Changsha.

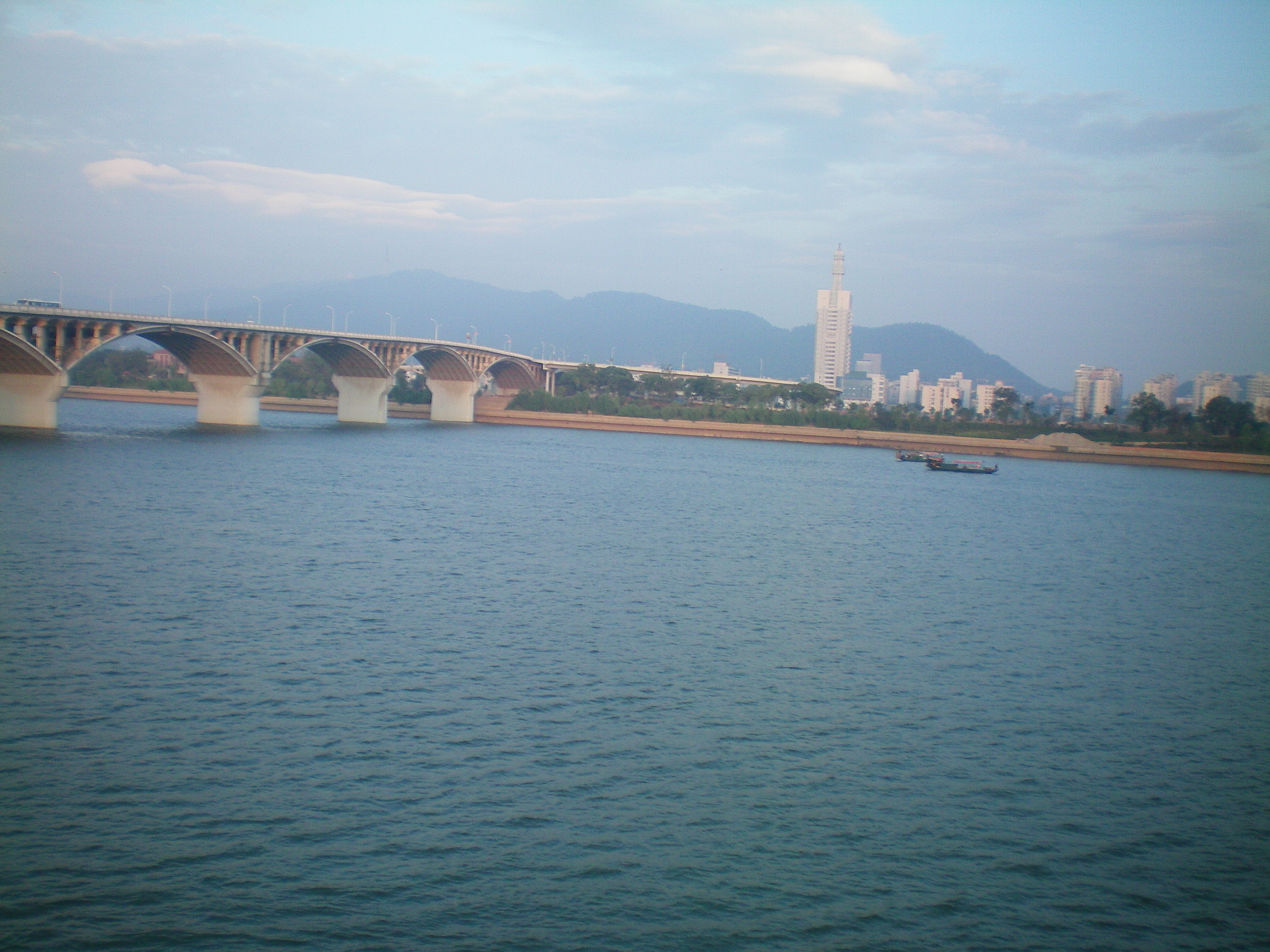
Picture of Xiang River in Changsha, the Orange Island Bridge is on the left and Orange Isle (Juzizhou) is in front.

The Upper Xiang River has two large Branches, the West (left) and East (right). The West Branch is traditionally known as the main stream, originating from the Haiyang Mountains in Guilin of Guangxi. In Hunan, there had been debate on whether or not this tradition of regarding the West Branch as the main stream is actually founded. According to the 2011 national Water Census of China, it is the East Branch, not the West, that should be regarded as the main stream of the Xiang. This is because it is both longer and contributes a greater volume of water than the western branch. The east branch retains the name of Xiao River, and it rises in Yegou Mountain (野狗岭) of Xiangjiangyuan Township (湘江源瑶族乡) in Lanshan County, Hunan. The two branches converge at Ping Island to form the Main Stem of the Xiang. The Main Stem is located in the eastern part of Hunan. The Xiang generally flows southwest to northeast from Lingling District of Yongzhou to Xiangyin County, and empties into the Yangtze River via Lake Dongting.

=== Upper Course ===
The Left Branch, also known as the West Branch of the upper course is traditionally known the upper Xiang River, the portion of the Xiang River upstream called Xiangshui River (湘水). From the headwaters at Xing'an County, Guangxi, the West Branch flows approximately 261 kilometres (162 mi) to Ping Island of Yongzhou, where it is joined by the Xiao River to form the middle Xiang River.

Historically it was recognized that the headwaters of the Xiang rise in Haiyang Mountains. People say the Xiang and the Li Rivers share the same origin, because the upper reaches of the two rivers are connected by the ancient Lingqu Canal, which is located in Xing'an County, Guangxi. According to a traditional saying, 70% of the water in Lingqu flows into the Xiang and 30% flows into the Li River. In the past, the canal, along with the Xiang River and the Gui River provided an important waterway connecting the Yangtze River with the Pearl River Delta.

=== Xiao River ===
The Xiao River is the East Branch of the upper course. As of 2011 Water Census of China, it may be regarded as the Main Stream of the upper Xiang River. Xiao rises in Xiangjiangyuan Township of Lanshan County, from the headwaters to Ping Island at the confluence with the West Branch (Left Branch) from Guangxi, it runs 365 kilometres (227 mi). With the tributaries, the Xiao River has a drainage basin area of 12,094 square kilometres (4,670 sq mi).

== In culture ==
In the Chinese folk religion, the river is protected by the "Xiang River goddesses" or "Xiang Consorts" Ehuang and Nüying. They are said to have been the daughters of the legendary ruler Yao and the wives of his successor Shun. Unable to bear the pain of their husband's death, they committed suicide in this river. An etiological myth relates the spots on the spotted bamboo (斑竹), also known as the Xiang bamboo (湘竹 or 湘江竹), Xiang Consort bamboo (湘妃竹), and teardrop bamboo (淚竹), to the tears of the weeping consorts. They were worshipped in some form by the people of Chu during the Warring States and its poet Qu Yuan is credited with writing the "Ladies Xiang" (湘夫人) to document the ritual songs in their honor.

The late Tang Dynasty poet Yu Wuling is supposed to have been fond of the scenery along the Xiang River.

The classic Chinese novel The Dream of the Red Chamber includes a character Shi Xiangyun who takes one of the characters of her name from the river.

Mao Zedong's Shian Kian Weekly Review, founded on 14 June 1919, publicized Marxism in Changsha.

== Major cities along the river ==
- Hengyang
- Zhuzhou
- Xiangtan
- Changsha

== See also ==
- Dongting Lake
- List of Chinese rivers
- Xiaoxiang
- Xinglian Road Bridge
- Dongjiang Lake
