= Mengzhu Mountains =

Mountain ranges in China

The Mengzhu Mountains (Chinese: 萌渚岭; pinyin: méngzhǔ lǐng), also known as Mingzhu Mountains (名渚岭) are a group of mountain ranges located in Guangxi and Hunan Provinces, one of the Five Ranges in the Nanling Ranges. The Mengzhu Mountains generally runs northeast to southwest and stretch more than 130 kilometres (81 mi) from Jiangyong, Jianghua Counties in the Southern Hunan, to Babu District of Hezhou, Fuchuan County in the eastern Guangxi.
