= Yinzhen tea =

Yinzhen tea may refer to:

- Baihao Yinzhen tea, a white tea
- Junshan Yinzhen tea, a yellow tea
