= Junshan =

Junshan may refer to:

- Junshan District, in Yueyang, Hunan, China
- Junshan Island, on Dongting Lake, in Hunan, China
- Junshan Yinzhen tea, Yellow tea from Junshan Island
- Junshan Township in the Caidian District of Wuhan, Hubei, China
