= Yu Wuling =

Chinese poet of the late Tang dynasty

- Chinese: 于武陵
- Literal meaning: (courtesy name)
Transcriptions
Standard Mandarin
- Hanyu Pinyin: Yú Wūlíng
- Wade–Giles: Yu^{1} Wu^{2}ling^{1}

Alternative Chinese name
- Traditional Chinese: 于鄴
- Simplified Chinese: 于邺
- Literal meaning: (given name)
Transcriptions
Standard Mandarin
- Hanyu Pinyin: Yú Yè
- Wade–Giles: Yu^{1} Yeh^{4}

Yu Wuling (810–?) was a Chinese poet of the late Tang dynasty. His birth name was Yu Ye; Wuling was his courtesy name.

He attained a jinshi degree in the imperial examination, but gave up his position in order to wander around the country.

His best-known poem is the jueju "Offering Wine", and Book 595 of the Quan Tangshi is devoted to his poetry.

== Biography ==
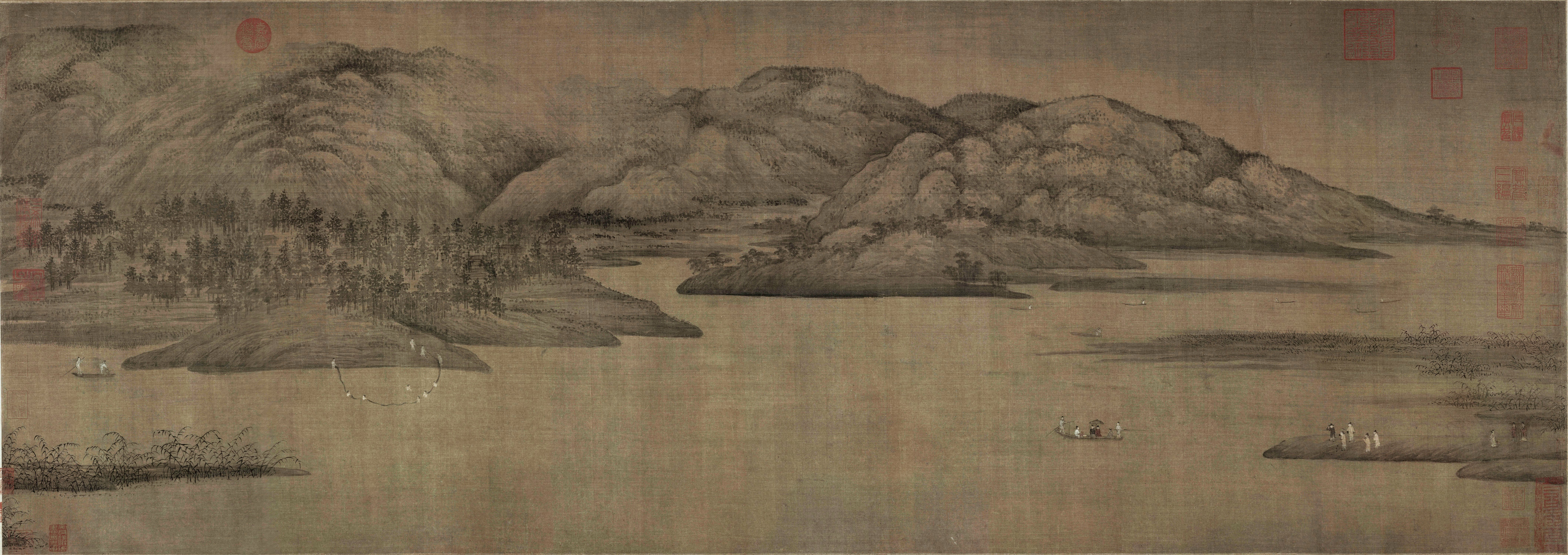
Xiang River

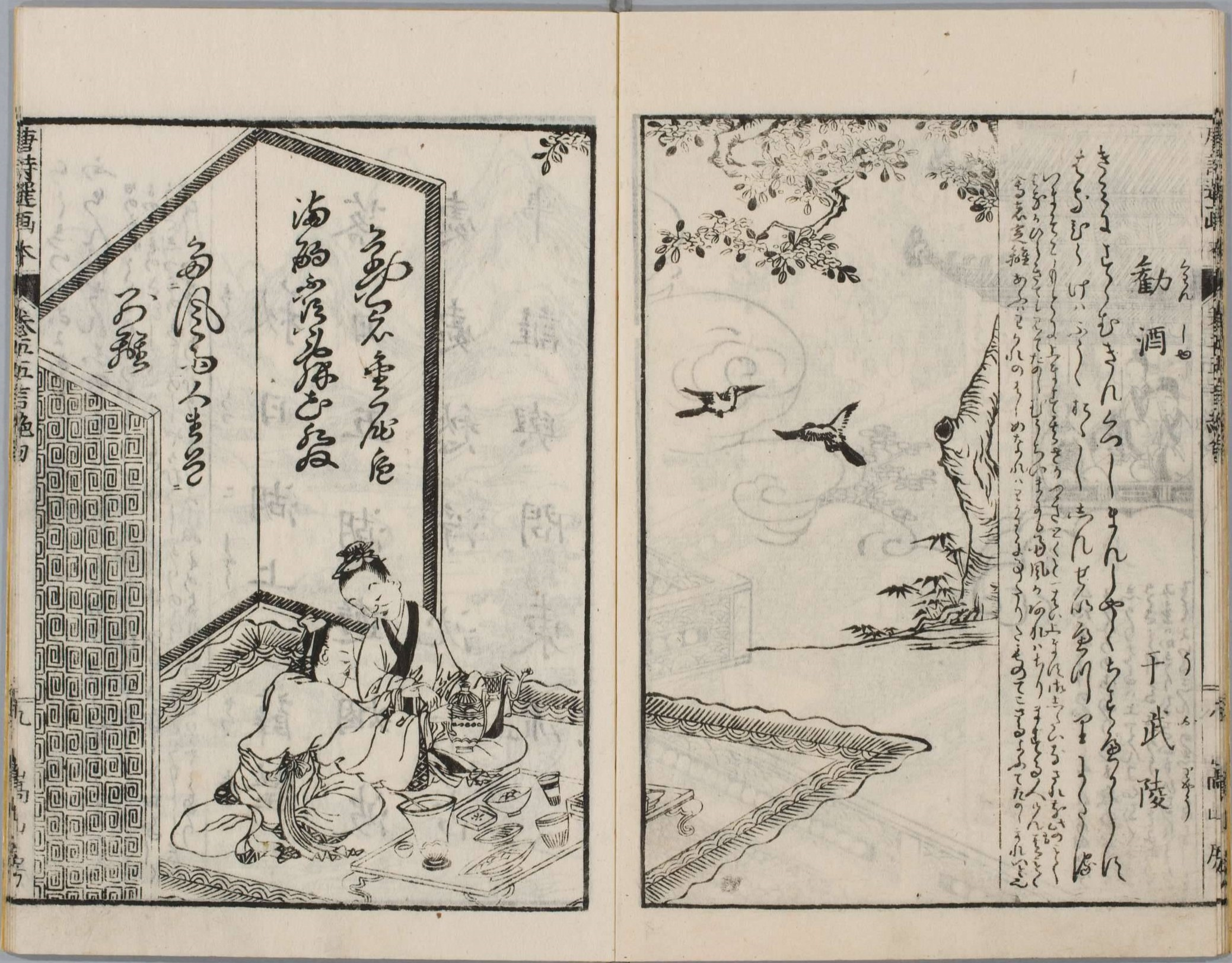
"Offering Wine" by Yu Wuling, in a Japanese edition of selected Tang poems with illustrations (1836).

He was born in 810, (Note: Ōtani 2013 and Ueki et al. 1999 both state that his year of birth is not known.) in Duqu (Chinese: 杜曲; pinyin: Dùqū; Wade–Giles: Tuch'ü, in modern-day Xi'an, Shaanxi Province). What little is known of his life comes from the Tang Cai Zi Zhuan.

The name by which he is usually known, Wuling, was his courtesy name, his birth name having been Yu Ye.

During the Dachong era (847–859) he attained a jinshi degree in the imperial examination. Unsatisfied with his position, he took up a life of wandering around various parts of the country.

After giving up his position at court and travelling around the country, he is supposed to have shown particular fondness for Dongting Lake and the Xiang River. He spent his later years living in seclusion south of Mount Song.

The date of his death is unknown.

== Poetry ==
There is an anthology of his poetry called the Yu Wuling Ji (Chinese: 于武陵集; pinyin: Yú Wūlíng-jí; Wade–Giles: Yu^{1} Wu^{2}ling^{1} Chi^{1}; lit. 'Yu Wuling Anthology'). The two primary texts of his poems are found in Book 595 of the eighteenth-century Quan Tangshi and the Tangren Wushi Jia Xiaoji (Chinese: 唐人五十家小集; pinyin: Tángrén Wǔshí Jiā Xiǎojí), which each order his poems differently.

His best-known poem is the jueju "Offering Wine" (simplified Chinese: 劝酒; traditional Chinese: 勸酒; pinyin: quàn jiū; Wade–Giles: ch'üan^{4} chiu^{2}).

Traditional	Simplified	Pinyin	English translation (by Burton Watson)
勸君金屈卮， 滿酌不須辭。 花發多風雨， 人生足別離。	劝君金屈卮， 满酌不须辞。 花发多风雨， 人生足别离。	quàn jūn jīn qū zhī, mǎn zhuó bù xū cí. huā fā duō fēng yǔ, rén shēng zú bié lí.	I offer you the golden flagon; do not disdain its brimming gift. Wind and rain await the opening flower, and partings make up too much of our life.

Ueki et al. speculate, based on a passage in the Song Huiyao (Chinese: 宋会要; Chinese: 宋會要; pinyin: Sòng Huìyāo) that records that qū zhī were offered as tribute from Srivijaya (Chinese: 三佛齐国; Chinese: 三佛齊國; pinyin: Sānfóqí-guó), that the "golden flagon" in this poem may also have been a valuable imported item. This, combined with the use of mǎn zhuó ("brimming") create an atmosphere in the first half of the quatrain of an extravagant banquet. This atmosphere contrasts with that of the last two lines, which carry the implication that one should drink deeply before the blossoms fall, before the time for parting arrives.

The final line of this poem has become particularly well-known and is sometimes taken to represent Yu Wuling's view of life. Masuji Ibuse's Japanese translation of this poem is also famous.

== Works cited ==
- "Yu Wu-ling (U Buryō in Japanese)". Britannica Kokusai Dai-Hyakkajiten (in Japanese). Encyclopædia Britannica, Inc. 2014. Archived from the original on 2016-11-03.
- Kageyama, Tatsuya. "Chūgoku no Hon no Hanashi 60 – Bungō to Kanshi (Sono Ni): Ibuse Masuji Yakuyoke Shishū" (PDF). Kyoto University of Foreign Studies Library (in Japanese). Kyoto University of Foreign Studies. p. 11.
- Ōtani, Junko (2013-12-13). U Buryō Shi Kenkyū: Shigo ni takusareta wakare no omoi (PDF) (thesis outline). Hyogo University of Teacher Education. Archived from the original (PDF) on 2016-11-05.
- Ueki, Hisayuki; Uno, Naoto; Matsubara, Akira (1999). "Shijin to Shi no Shōgai (U Buryō)". In Matsuura, Tomohisa (ed.). Kanshi no Jiten 漢詩の事典 (in Japanese). Vol. 1. Tokyo: Taishūkan Shoten. pp. 133–134. OCLC 41025662.
