= TGL Co. =

Indian tea manufacturer

The Good Life Company
- Company type: Private
- Industry: Internet, FMCG
- Founded: 2016
- Founders: Bhuman Dani, Shariq Ashraf
- Headquarters: Mumbai, India
- Services: E-commerce (Online shopping)
- Number of employees: 85
- Website: TGLCompany.com

TGL Co. (The Good Life Company) is an Indian tea and coffee company headquartered in Mumbai.

== History ==
Bhuman Dani and Shariq Ashraf co-founded The Good Life Company (d/b/a TGL Co.) in 2016. Dani was inspired by the East India Company in London and undertook apprenticeship with Jane Pettigrew to learn more about teas. Ashraf was influenced with the tea knowledge of Inés Berton, the founder of Tealosophy, and the coffee culture of Melbourne where he lived. Dani and Ashraf met at the Boston Consulting Group alumni meet and shared their mutual interest in teas and coffees. The duo decided to bring specialty tea and coffee range to India and founded the company in 2016.

In 2017, it received seed round of investments from Ayesha Takia Azmi and Abu Farhan Azmi.

== Product ==
TGL Co. sources teas and coffees from plantations in Japan, China, Taiwan, Sri Lanka, and India. They are blended with various spices and herbs. Their products include various types of teas such as green teas, white teas, black teas, oolong teas, and tisanes. In 2018, the company ventured into coffee segment with roasted coffee beans and instant coffees. In 2019, they sold over 6 tonnes of tea and 4 tonnes of coffee through their presence across online marketplaces and over 600 HORECA and retail outlets in India.

== Recognition ==
In 2019, The Good Life Company won the Best Entrepreneur Award at the second edition of the Indo-French Chamber of Commerce and Industry (IFCCI) awards and bronze medal at the Global Tea Spring Hot Loose Tea Championship held in Colorado, in the gunpowder tea category. It also won the Most Admired Startup of the Year of 2019 by IMAGES Group. In 2020, it won Startup of the Year by Entrepreneur India.
