= Spotted bamboo =

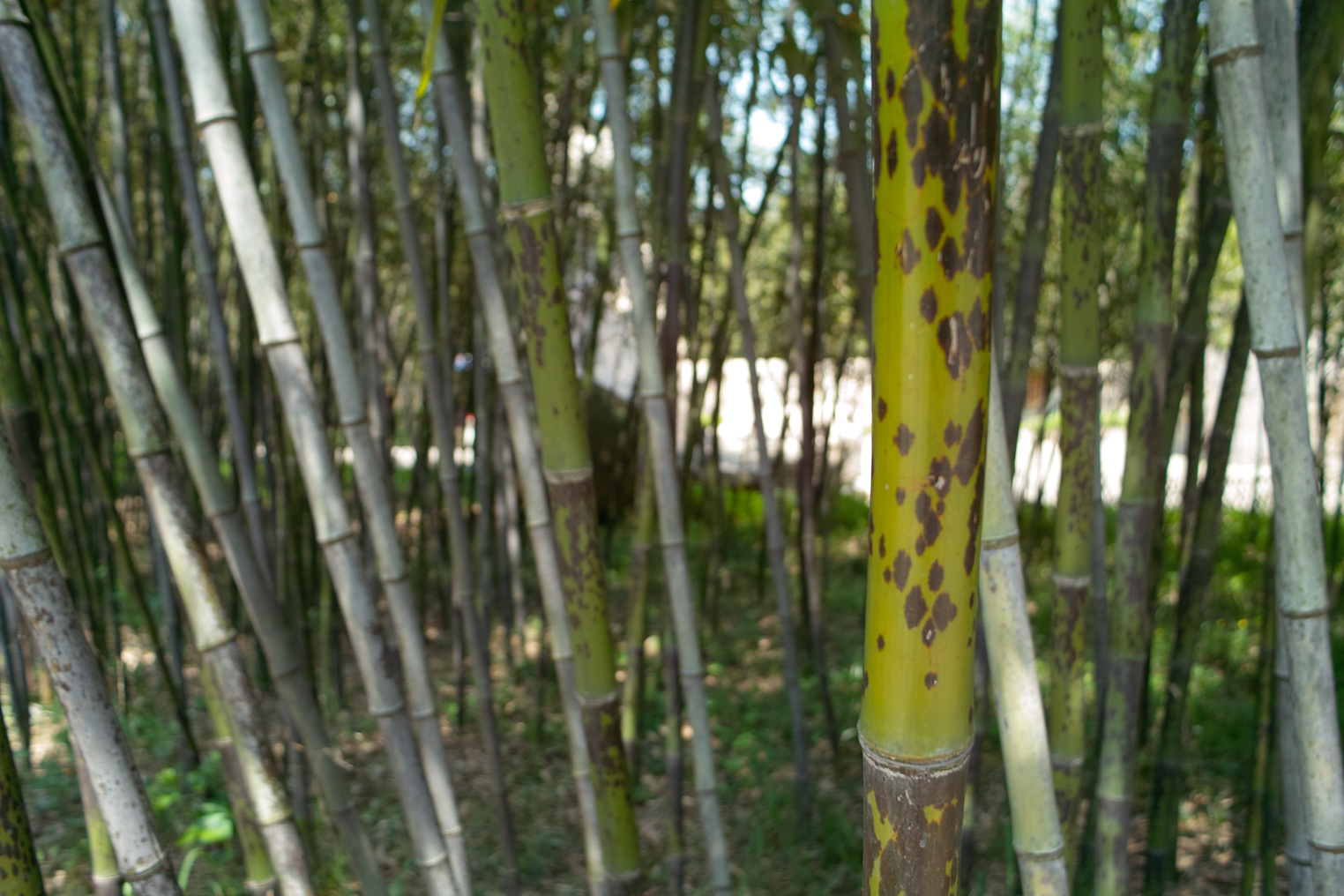
- Spotted bamboo (Phyllostachys bambusoides f. lacrima-deae Keng & Wen), also known as Chinese: 斑竹; pinyin: bānzhú
- Species: Phyllostachys bambusoides f. lacrima-deae
- Origin: China

Spotted bamboo refers to several types of bamboo with stems that are mottled by dark spots, sometimes considered to be within the genus Phyllostachys and forms of Phyllostachys bambusoides, also known as teardrop bamboo and as mottled bamboo. Phyllostachys bambusoides forma. lacrima-deae is widely encountered.

== Distribution ==
Phyllostachys bambusoides forma. lacrima-deae, is native to Hunan, Henan, Jiangxi and Zhejiang, and especially the Jiuyi Mountains areas of China.

== Uses ==
The stems of the spotted bamboos are esteemed and cost-effective for making the handles of Chinese brushes, used for calligraphy and painting.

Examples of brushes from the eighth century CE (corresponding to the Tang dynasty, in China) are preserved in the Shōsōin, in Japan; in fact, the prestige value of this type of bamboo was evidently so high at the time that among the Shōsōin treasures are preserved objects made out of some sort of imitation spotted bamboo.

== Legendary origins ==
Legend has it that when Emperor Shun died suddenly during a trip to Cangwu, the tears of his two concubines, (the Xiang River goddesses Ehuang (娥皇) and Nüying (女英)) dropped onto surrounding bamboo and stained it forever. Mottled bamboo is known for being a decorative plant. The Chinese name of Chinese: 湘妃竹; pinyin: Xiāngfēi zhú originates from the legend. Xiang (湘) refers to the Xiang River, where the story supposedly took place, fei (妃) means "concubine" and zhu (竹) means "bamboo", thus the "bamboo of the concubines by the Xiang River".

The term "mottled bamboo" is also used to describe online discussion board moderators in Mainland China, because when the word for moderator (版主) is entered using the keyboard in Pinyin, the word for mottled bamboo (斑竹) appears as the first option, as they sound very similar. Hence, mottled bamboo gradually became another way of calling a moderator.

== See also ==
- Cosmopterix phyllostachysea
- Bamboo
- Dongting Lake
- Four Treasures of the Study
- Mottled Bamboo
- Xiaoxiang
- Xiaoxiang poetry
- Xiang River
- Xiang River goddesses
