= Virgin white tea =

Sri Lankan white tea

Virgin white tea is a white tea of Sri Lankan origin.

== History ==
The concept of the virgin white tea is found in Chinese mythology. The virgin white tea is considered as one of the most expensive teas in the world.

== Health effects ==
The virgin white tea is considered rich in antioxidants.

== Plantations ==
Weligama, Sri Lanka is well-known for virgin white tea plantations.
