= Wei Yifan =

Wei Yifan (韋貽範) (died December 16, 902), courtesy name Chuixian (垂憲), was an official of the Chinese Tang dynasty, who briefly served as chancellor in 902, while Emperor Zhaozong was under the physical control of the warlord Li Maozhen the military governor (Jiedushi) of Fengxiang Circuit (鳳翔, headquartered in modern Baoji, Shaanxi) and Li's eunuch allies, led by Han Quanhui.

== Background ==
Little is known about Wei Yifan's family background, and it is not known when or where he was born. His family was described as "of Jingzhao" (京兆, i.e., the special municipality containing the Tang dynasty imperial capital Chang'an), but was not known to be connected to the families of other chancellors named Wei throughout Tang history. Neither his grandfather Wei Zongli (韋宗立) nor his father Wei Shi (韋式) was listed with any official offices. He had at least three older brothers — Wei Kuangfan (韋匡範), Wei Zhaofan (韋昭範), and Wei Changfan (韋昌範); Wei Changfan was also an imperial official.

Wei Yifan's early official career was also not given in detail in traditional histories. He had, at one point, served as the prefect of Long Prefecture (龍州, in modern Mianyang, Sichuan) but was demoted to be the prefect of the less important Tong Prefecture (通州, in modern Dazhou, Sichuan).

== As chancellor ==
After then-reigning Emperor Zhaozong was forcibly taken from Chang'an to Fengxiang Circuit in late 901 by the powerful eunuchs, led by Han Quanhui, Wei Yifan, along with another demoted prefect, Su Jian, went to Fengxiang and was made an imperial attendant (給事中, Jishizhong). Shortly after, in spring 902, apparently at the insistence of the eunuchs' ally, Fengxiang's military governor Li Maozhen, Wei was made the deputy minister of public works (工部侍郎, Gongbu Shilang) and a chancellor, with the designation Tong Zhongshu Menxia Pingzhangshi (同中書門下平章事).

Shortly after Wei became chancellor, there was a banquet that included Emperor Zhaozong, the chancellors, the imperial scholars, and the leading eunuchs. After Li and Han left the banquet, Emperor Zhaozong questioned Wei about the current predicament the emperor was in, and Wei gave no substantive response, drawing Emperor Zhaozong's anger and rebuke. It was said that at the same banquet, Wei insisted on offering Emperor Zhaozong large amounts of wine, and when Emperor Zhaozong would not drink, Wei would go as far as taking the cup and force it on Emperor Zhaozong's lips.

Several months later, Wei's mother died. Pursuant to Confucian principles, he left governmental service to observe a mourning period, traditionally for three years. However, both Wei and his close associate Liu Yanmei (劉延美) soon ran into trouble with creditors whom he had borrowed money from with the promises that he would give them official positions — which, as he was not chancellor at that point any more, he was unable to fulfill. He therefore sent messengers to Li as well as the leading eunuchs daily, begging to be recalled to governmental service. Apparently at Li's demand, less than a month after Wei's mother's death, Emperor Zhaozong agreed to recall Wei to serve as chancellor, but when the task of drafting the edict was assigned to the imperial scholar Han Wo, Han refused — and instead submitted a petition pointing out the extreme impropriety of recalling Wei to governmental service after such a short mourning period. Li initially threatened Han with death, but thereafter relented and instead threatened to send Wei to Bin Prefecture (邠州, in modern Xianyang, Shaanxi). Wei therefore stopped his lobbying for some time. Liu, unable to face the creditors, committed suicide.

Less than a month later, however, apparently Li again insisted on Wei becoming chancellor again. This time, the task of drafting the edict was assigned to a different imperial scholar, Yao Ji. In contravention to the usual custom of initially declining the commission and then accepting it, Wei made no efforts to decline, and instead immediately submitted a petition thanking the emperor for the commission. He resumed his chancellor office the next day. He died in late 902.

== Notes and references ==
- New Book of Tang, vol. 182.
- Zizhi Tongjian, vol. 263.
