= Junshan Yinzhen =

Chinese yellow tea

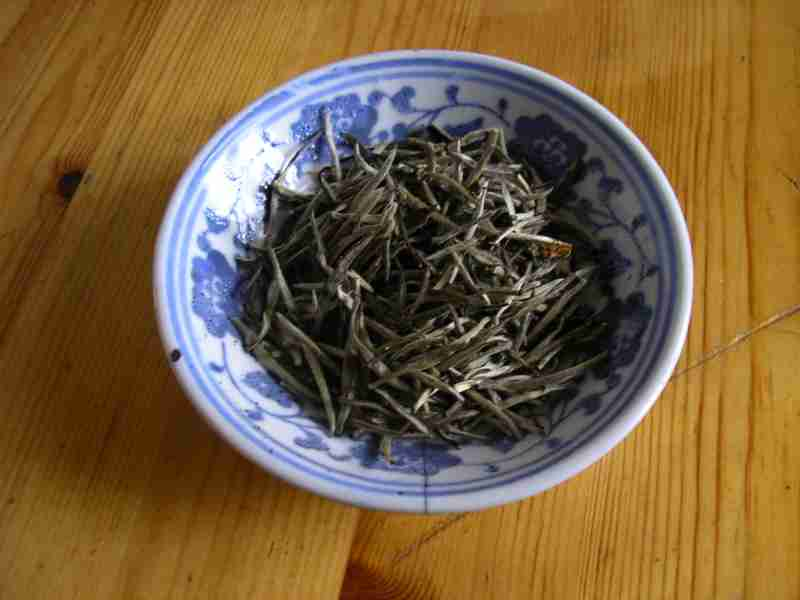
- Type: Yellow
- Other names: Mount Jun Silver Needle; Jun Mountain Silver Needle
- Origin: China
- Quick description: One of the Famous Chinese Teas.

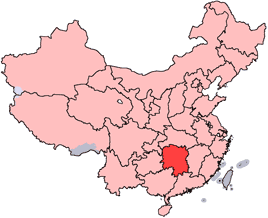
Junshan Yinzhen is grown in Hunan province, China.

Junshan Yinzhen (simplified Chinese: 君山银针; traditional Chinese: 君山銀針; pinyin: Jūnshān Yínzhēn; lit. 'Silver Needle(s) of the Jun Mountain'; Standard Chinese pronunciation [tɕýn.ʂán ǐn.ʈʂə́n]) is a yellow tea from Junshan Island of the Hunan Province in China. It is considered to be China's rarest tea and one of the Ten Chinese Famous Teas.

Although the same kind of tea trees are also planted around Dongting Lake, where Junshan Island is located, those teas should not be called Junshan Yinzhen. The tea resembles the White tea Yinzhen known as Bai Hao Yinzhen. Junshan Yinzhen, allegedly the preferred tea of Chairman Mao Zedong, is a rare tea sometimes sold as White tea.

== See also ==
- Baihao Yinzhen
- China Famous Tea
