= Xiaoxiang =

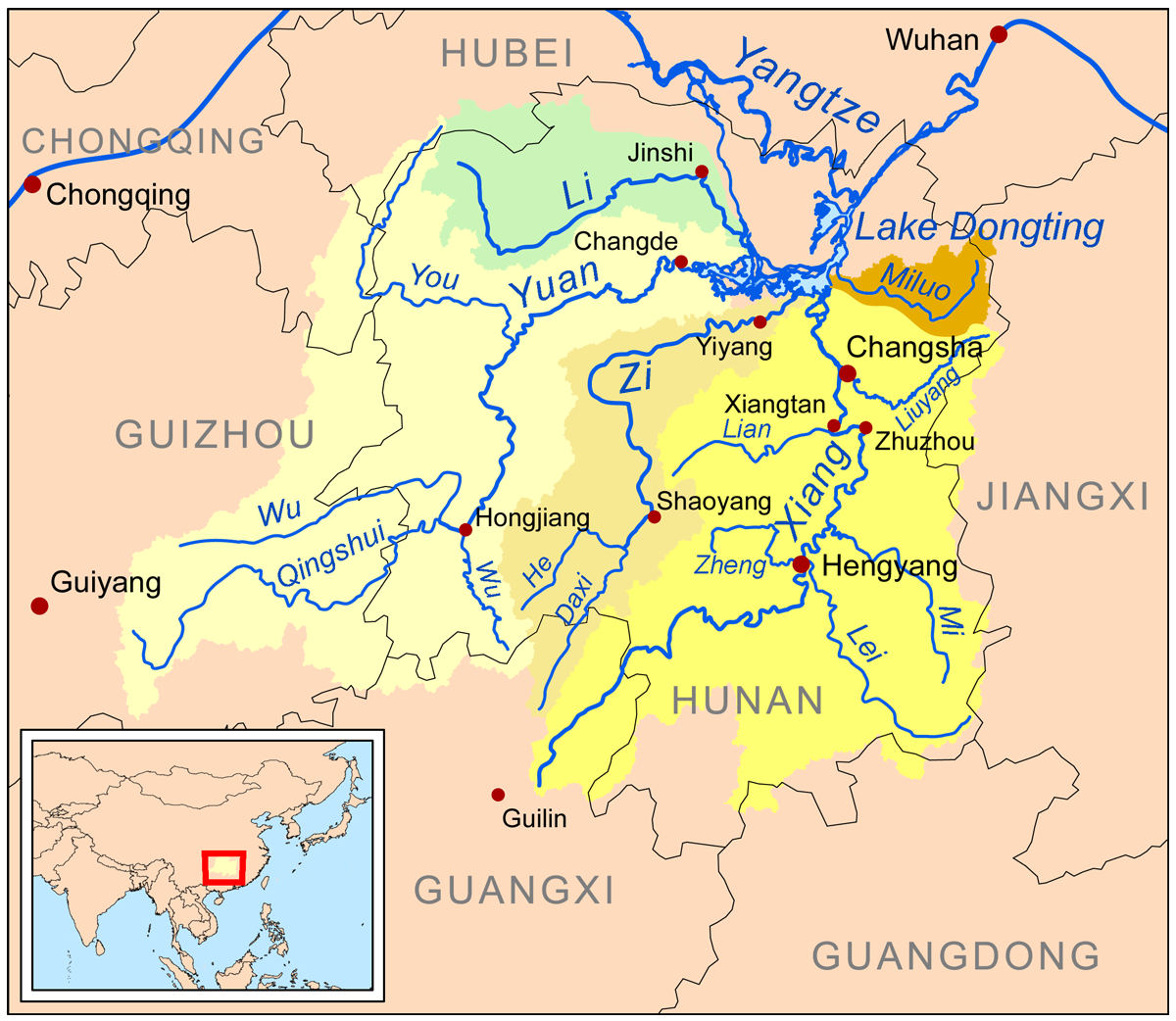
Map showing various lakes and rivers in the Xiaoxiang region, including the Xiao and Xiang Rivers

Xiaoxiang (traditional Chinese: 瀟湘; simplified Chinese: 潇湘; pinyin: Xiāo Xiāng), also transliterated XiaoXiang, Hsiao Hsiang, and Chiu Chiang, in some older sources, refers to the "lakes and rivers" region in south-central China south of the middle-reaches of the Yangtze River and corresponding, more or less, with Hunan province. Xiaoxiang is less a precise geographic entity than a concept. Xiaoxiang is used in the genre of Xiaoxiang poetry of Classical Chinese poetry and in literature for symbolic purposes, in part because this was a significant area, which at least through the Song dynastic era was still considered a wild place full of malaria and wild beasts. For much of early Chinese history, this area belonged to the state of Chu. Beginning at least with Qu Yuan, in the third century BCE, this region came to symbolically represent the unjust exile of a talented minister or government official by an unappreciative king or emperor.

The following quote succinctly describes the authors who helped shape the literary image of the Xiaoxiang and their feelings in that regard:

With few exceptions, their compositions adopted the literary trope of the south as a place of unjust exile, and the XiaoXiang literary paradigm came to be permeated with the themes of separation and accusations that the sovereigns were listening to the wrong men. Even the name XiaoXiang has a melancholy ring.

— Alfreda Murck

The name Xiaoxiang comes in part from the name of the Xiang River, which rises in the mountains of Guangxi and flows into Dongting Lake. There is a modern Xiao River, which is a tributary of the Xiang River, and joins it near present-day cities of Yongzhou and Changsha; however, the name Xiaoxiang predates the bestowing of that name on the Xiao River: originally the adjective xiao, meaning "clear and deep", was used to descriptively for the Xiang River.

The Xiaoxiang region is the somewhat imaginative location of the various eponymous and symbolic Eight Views of Xiaoxiang series of eight paintings and/or poetry verses.

== See also ==
- Cangwu County
- Changsha
- Chu (state)
- Chuci
- Classical Chinese poetry
- Dong Yuan
- Dongting Lake
- Eight Views of Xiaoxiang
- Hunan
- Miluo River
- Qu Yuan
- Shōnan
- Shun (Chinese leader)
- Spotted bamboo
- Xiang River
- Xiang River goddesses
- Xiao River
- Xiaoxiang poetry
- Yongzhou
