= Baimudan tea =

White tea

Bai Mu Dan tea
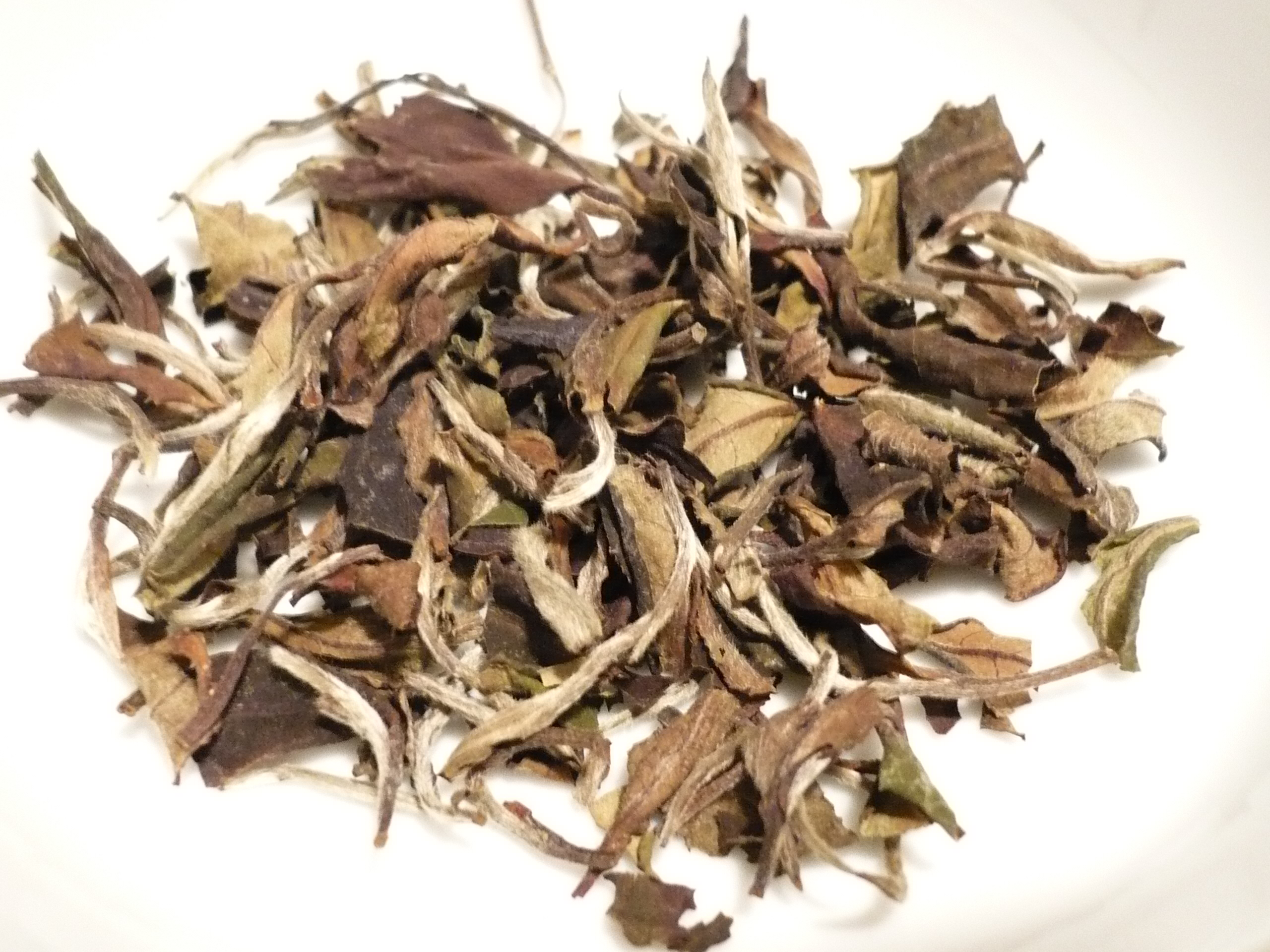
- Type: White
- Other names: Mudan White tea Mutan White tea White Peony tea Pai Mu Tan
- Origin: Fujian Province, China
- Quick description: A fruity tea, similar to Yinzhen but fuller in body and more floral in aroma, yet not as astringent as Shou Mei.

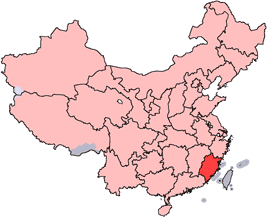
Baimudan tea is grown in Fujian province, China.

Bai Mudan (Chinese: 白牡丹; pinyin: bái mǔdān; Wade–Giles: pai^{2} mu^{3}-tan^{1}; lit. 'white peony') is a type of white tea made from plucks each with one leaf shoot and two immediate young leaves (one bud two leaf ratio) of the Camellia sinensis plant. Bai Mudan is sometimes preferred by white tea drinkers for its fuller flavor and greater potency than the other major type of white tea, Bai Hao Yinzhen. The latter is made purely with leaf shoots, and so it is comparatively softer and more subtle. The typical taste of Bai Mudan is a result of both the processing and the tea plant cultivars employed in the production.

== Production and processing ==
The family of tea cultivars used in producing Bai Mudan are the "Da Bai" (大白) varietal. In eastern Fujian, the cultivar Fuding Da Bai is used. In northern Fujian, the Zhenghe Da Bai cultivar is used. The differences in the plant yield two distinct styles of Bai Mudan: the Fuding variety and the Zhenghe variety.

Genuine Bai Mudan is a white tea; therefore, it is a slightly oxidized tea. The plucks are sun-withered for an extended period of time and then piled briefly for oxidation, during which enzymes of the tea leaves interact with other constituents to form new materials that result in the final taste and aromatic character of the tea. Depending on the weather, conditions of the pluck and the taste style requirements of the finished products, the sunning may last between 1 and 3 days and the piling between one half and 3 hours.

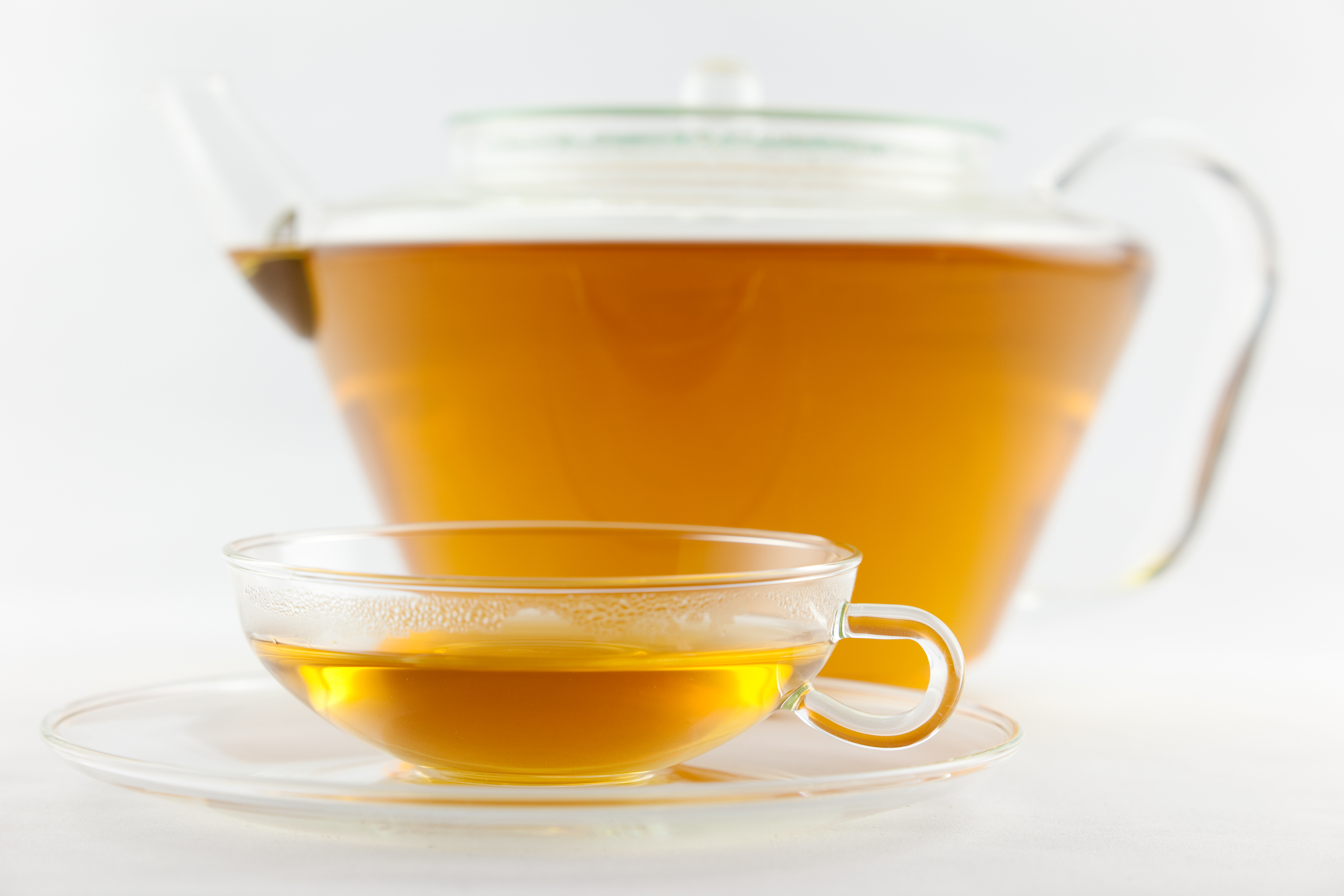
A glass of Bai Mudan

The leaves are then baked to dry for packing. The handling of the leaves remains gentle and non-intrusive throughout the process to avoid breakage of the cellular structure. This is needed because once the cell walls are physically broken, oxidation of the leaves quickens and the quality will be compromised.

Although the processing steps are simpler than those for other teas, the long process and the variable factors during which are key cost factors. For example, a sudden rainstorm during the lengthy withering can be destructive.

== Tasting and brewing ==
A very mild peony aroma and a floral aroma are noticed when brewing the tea. The tea is best brewed with good mineral water and at 70 to 80 °C (158 to 176 °F). The brew is a very pale green or golden color. The flavor is fruity; stronger than Silver Needle, yet not as strong as Shou Mei. The finest quality should have a shimmering clear infusion with a delicate lingering fragrance and a fresh, mellow, sweet taste devoid of astringency, and grassy flavors.

== Varieties ==
- Gushan Baiyun, otherwise known as, Drum Mountain White Cloud is a good quality Bai Mu Dan, originally grown by Buddhist monks at the monastery on Drum Mountain in the Fujian Province. The tea has a nutty aroma and was apparently tasted by Robert Fortune on his trip to China.

== See also ==
- Baihao Yinzhen
- Robert Fortune
- Shou Mei tea
- Silver Needle tea
- White tea
