= Shoumei tea =

Chinese white tea

Shou Mei
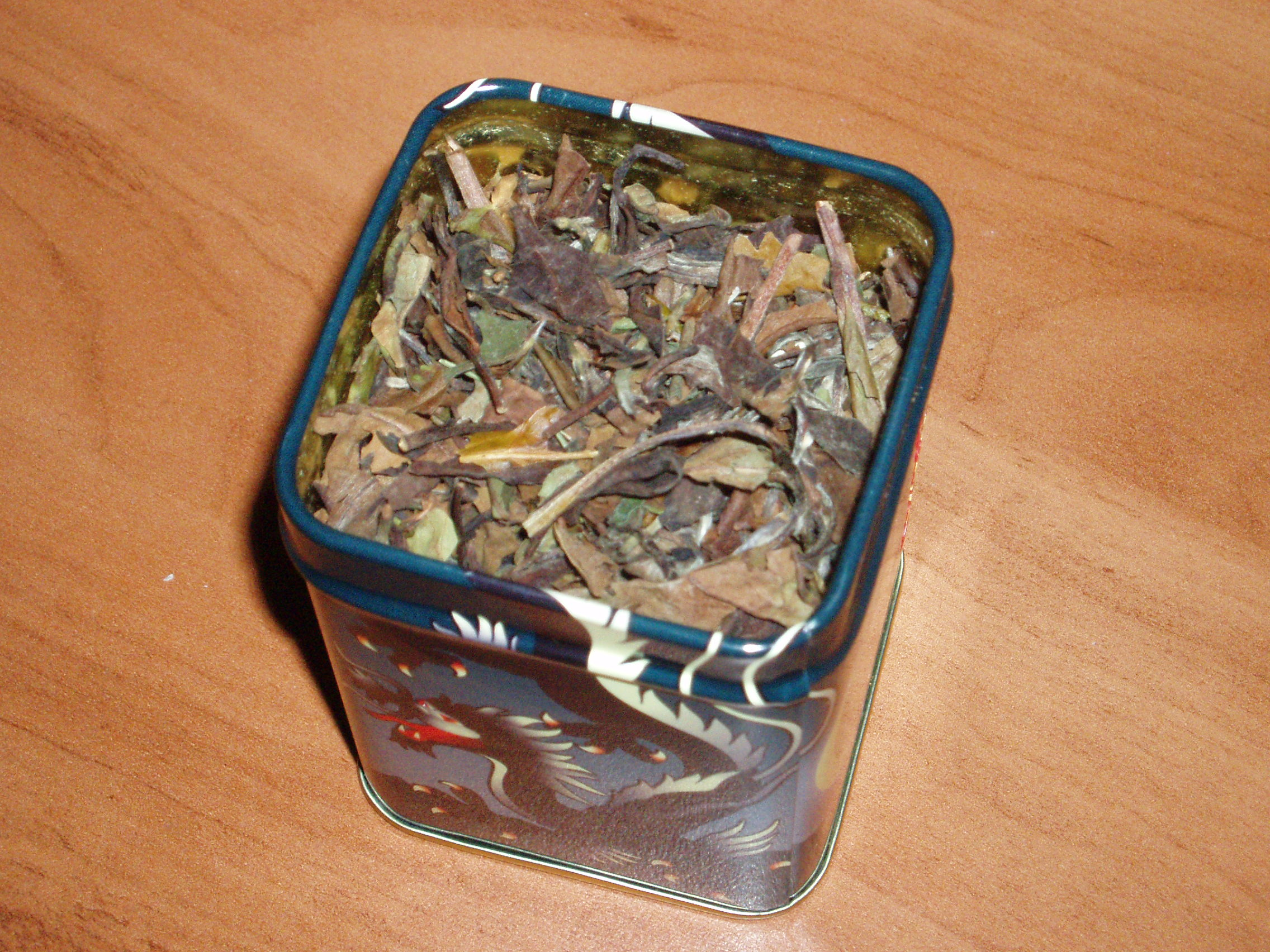
- Type: White
- Other names: Sow Mee, Longevity Eyebrow, 壽眉, 寿眉
- Origin: China
- Quick description: A fruity furry white tea that is a chaotic mix of tips and upper leaf, it has a stronger flavor than other white teas, similar to Oolong

Shoumei (simplified Chinese: 寿眉; traditional Chinese: 壽眉; pinyin: shòuméi; Cantonese Yale: sauh méi; Standard Chinese pronunciation [ʂôʊ.měɪ]) is a white tea that is produced from naturally withered upper leaf and tips, with a stronger flavor reminiscent of lighter oolong teas. It is mostly grown in Fujian Province and Guangxi Province in China. Because it is plucked later than Bai Mudan, the tea may be darker in color, but it should still have a proportionate green color. Some lower grades of Shou Mei may be golden in color with many black and red leaves, making a darker brew with more depth.

Technically this tea, being a fourth-grade tea, is a by-product of Baihao Yinzhen tea production and uses Da Bai or Large White leaves.

== Tasting and brewing ==
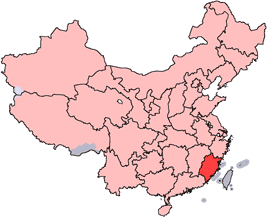
Shoumei tea is grown in Fujian province, China.

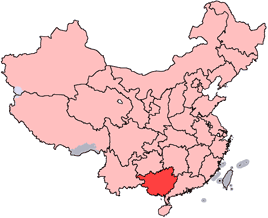
Shoumei tea is grown in Guangxi province, China.

The tea can be brewed very differently and there are many combinations that yield interesting results, but it is important to use good mineral water to bring out the sweetness and aroma of the tea and not to over brew or make a bitter and very strong brew.

Typically, white teas are brewed at a lower temperature than black teas. Often temperatures such as 70 degrees Celsius is all that is required. Different steep times and different temperatures have a remarkably different effect on the outcome of the final brew, but two to five minutes is ideal. This is correct for western style brewing when one is making the tea in a mug or western teapot, but when a gaiwan or yixing teapot is used in the gong fu style of brewing where larger quantities of leaf and smaller quantities of water are used and shared amongst the tea drinkers, steep times of less than a minute and measured in seconds would be preferred.

== See also ==
- List of Chinese teas
