= Dongting Lake =

Lake in Hunan province, China

- Tung-tʻing Lake
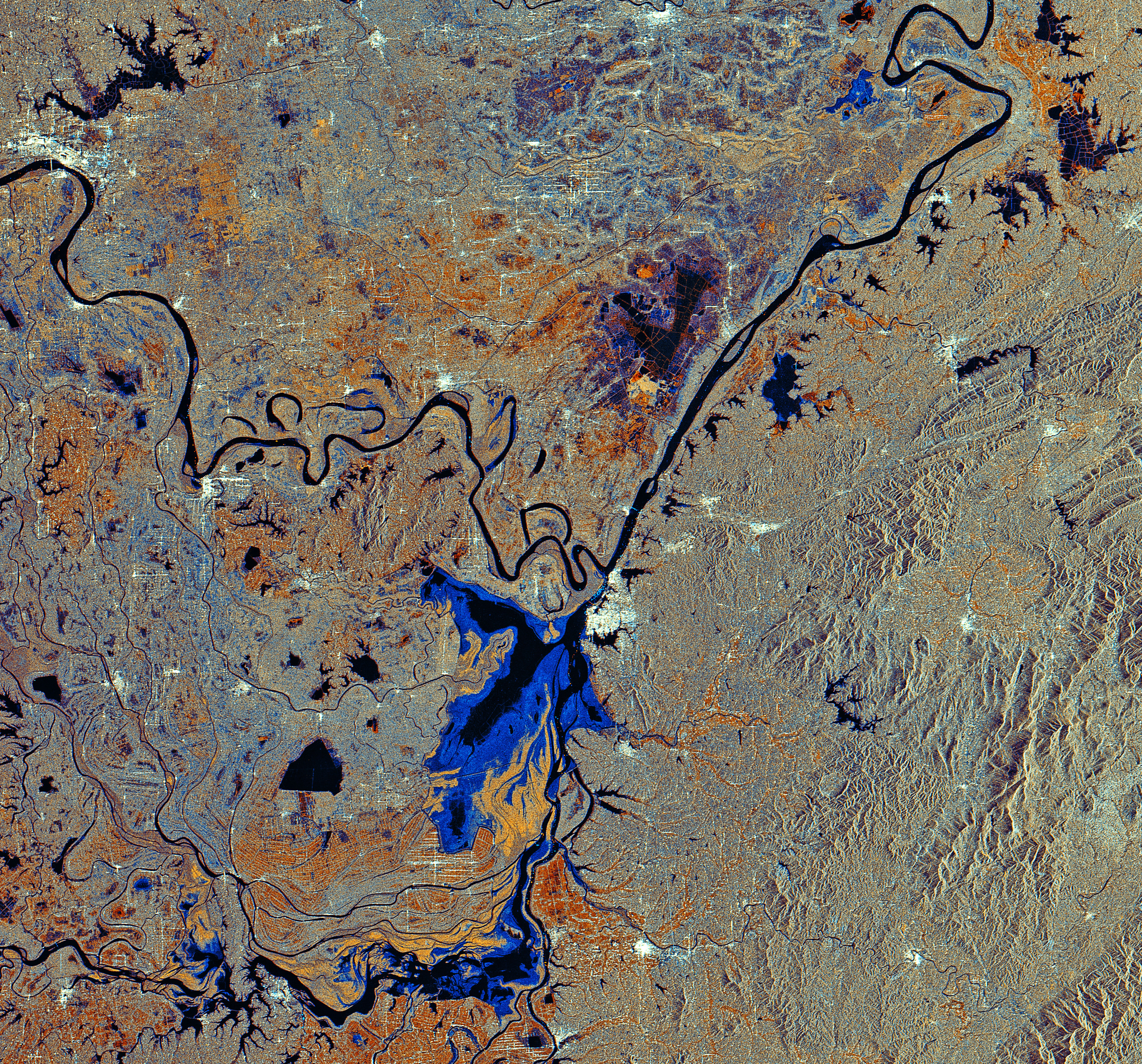

- Location within Hunan
- Location: Hunan Province
- Coordinates: 29°18′36″N 112°57′00″E
- Primary inflows: Yangtze, Xiang, Zi, Yuan, Li
- Primary outflows: Yangtze
- Basin countries: China
- Surface area: 2,820 km^{2} (1,090 sq mi) flood season: 20,000 km^{2} (7,700 sq mi)

Ramsar Wetland
- Official name: Dong-ting hu
- Designated: 31 March 1992
- Reference no.: 551

Dongting Lake
- "Lake Dongting" in Chinese characters
- Chinese: 洞庭湖
- Literal meaning: "Grotto Court Lake"
Transcriptions
Standard Mandarin
- Hanyu Pinyin: Dòngtíng Hú
- Wade–Giles: Tung^{4}-t'ing^{2} Hu^{2}
- IPA: [tʊ̂ŋ.tʰǐŋ xǔ]
Yue: Cantonese
- Yale Romanization: Duhng-tìhng Wùh
- Jyutping: Dung6-ting4 Wu4
- IPA: [tʊŋ˨tʰɪŋ˩ wu˩]
Southern Min
- Tâi-lô: Tōng-tîng Ôo

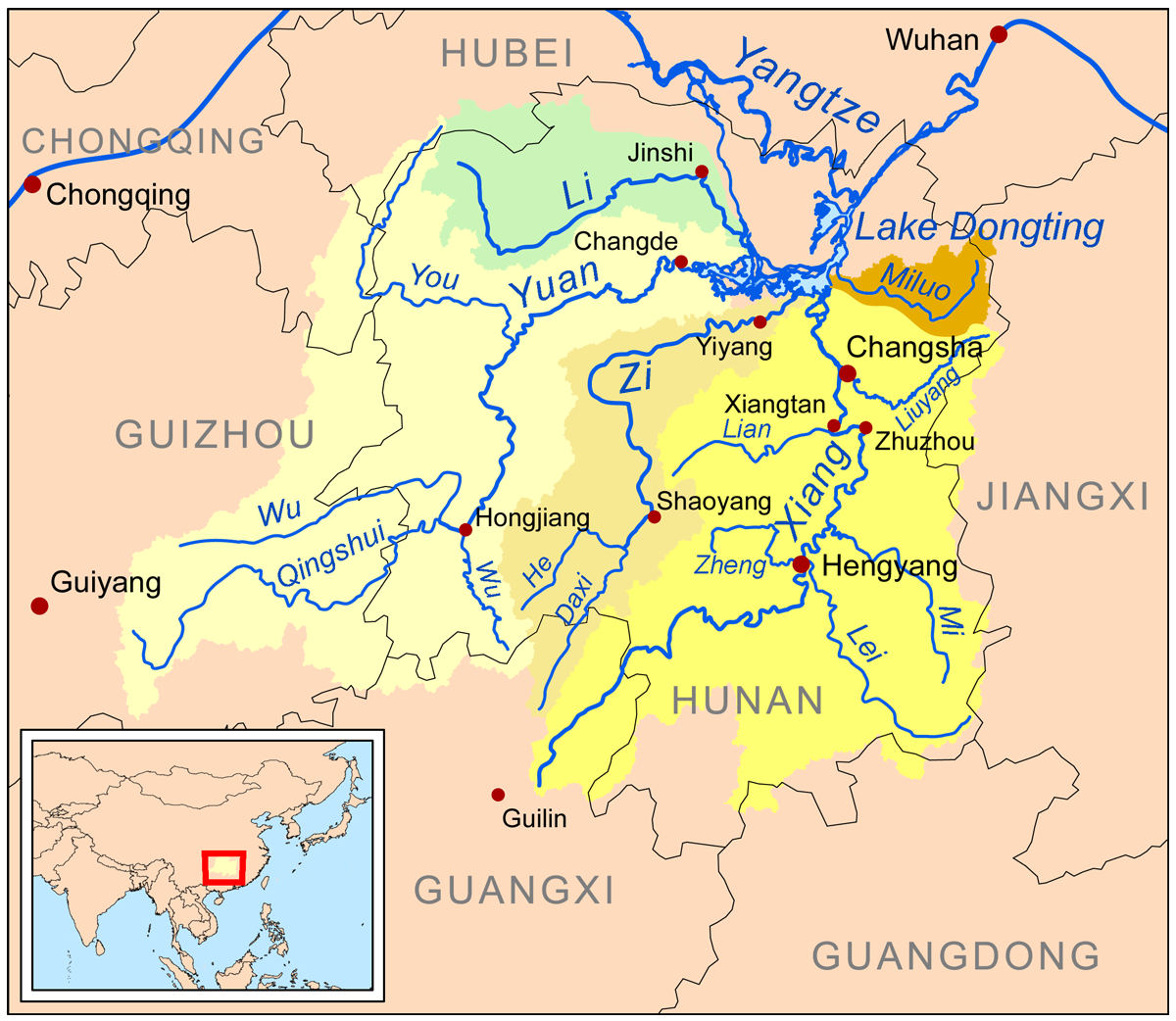
Map showing Lake Dongting and the major rivers flowing into it

Dongting Lake (Chinese: 洞庭湖) is a large, shallow lake in northeastern Hunan Province, China. Also referred to less frequently as the Dongting Plain, it is a flood basin of the Yangtze River, so its volume depends on the season. The provinces of Hubei and Hunan are named after their location relative to the lake: Hubei means "North of the Lake" and Hunan, "South of the Lake".

Dongting Lake is famous in Chinese culture as the place of origin of dragon boat racing and is home to the critically endangered Yangtze finless porpoise.

== Geography ==
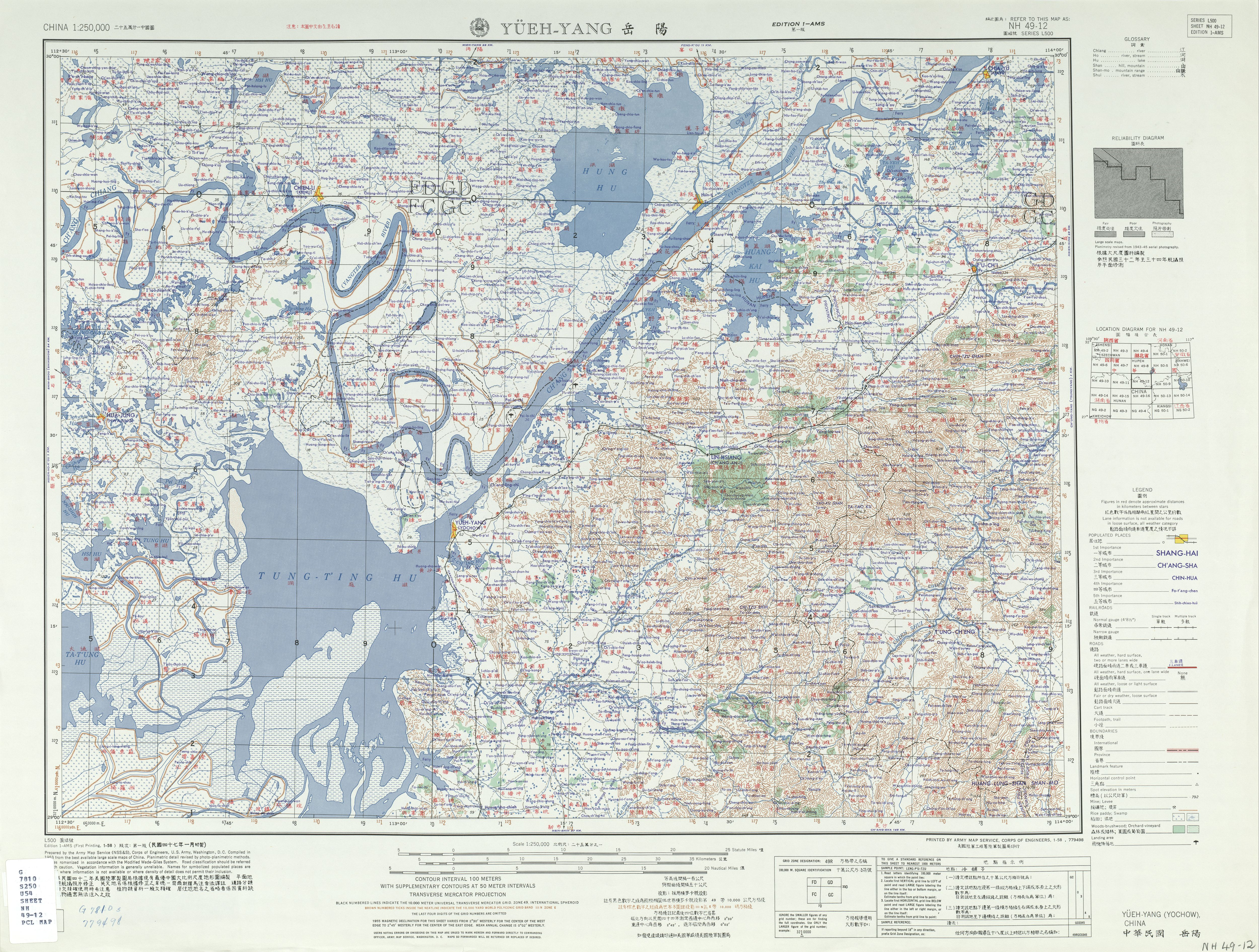
Map including Dongting Lake (labeled as TUNG-T'ING HU 洞庭湖) (1953)

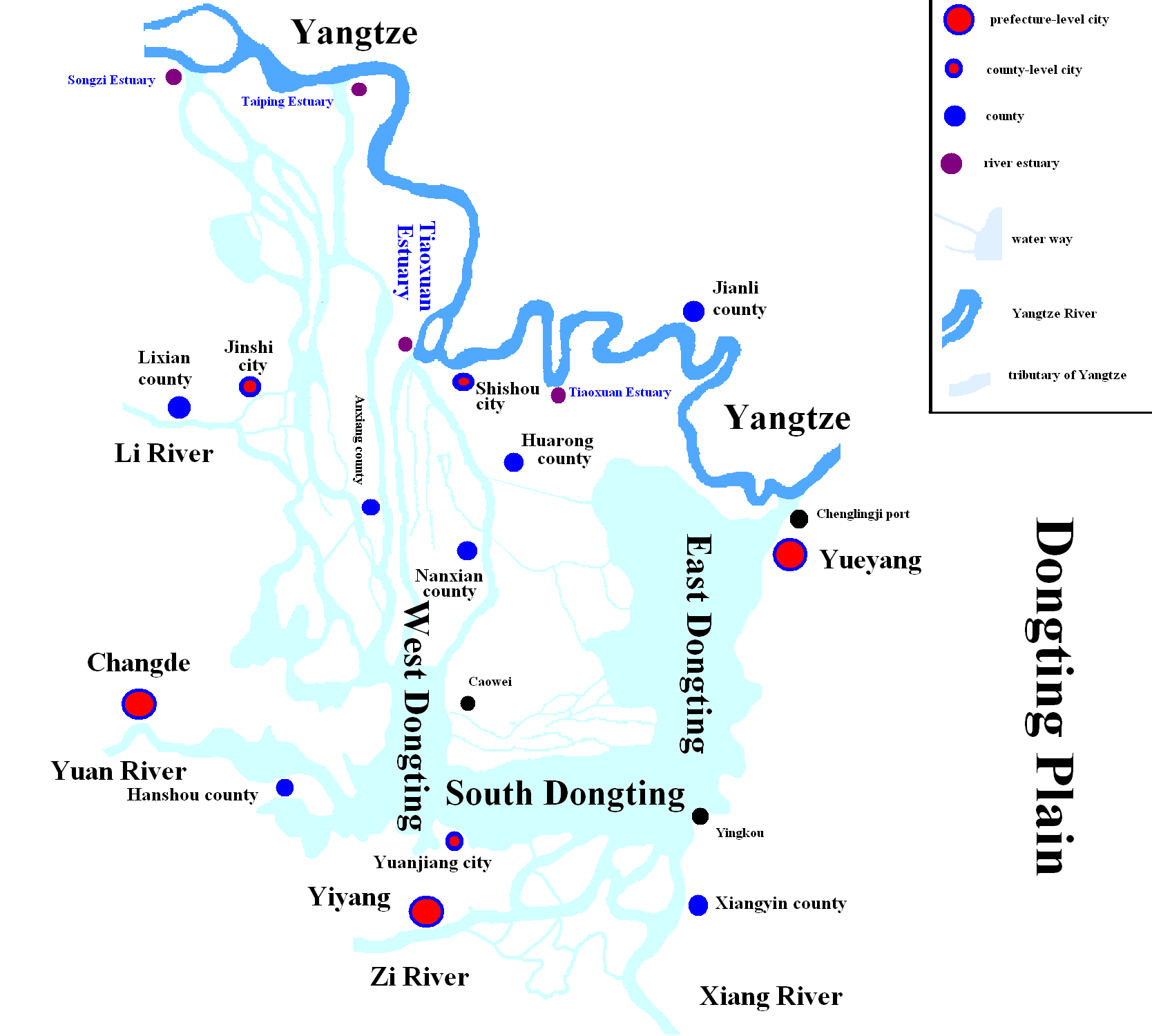
Map of Dongting Plain

In the July–September period, flood water from the Yangtze flows into the lake, enlarging it greatly. The lake's area, which normally is 2,820 km^{2} or 1,090 mi^{2} (data before 1998), may increase to 20,000 km^{2} (7,700 mi^{2}) in flood season, when vast amounts of water and sediment from the Chang Jiang flow into the lake. The lake is also fed by four major rivers: the Xiang, Zi, Yuan and Li rivers. Small rivers also flow in, the most famous being the Miluo River, where the loyal official and poet Qu Yuan committed suicide in the early 3rd century BC, according to tradition. In addition, the Xiao River flows into the Xiang near Yongzhou, before the Xiang flows into the lake. Ocean-going vessels can travel through the Xiang to reach Changsha.

== River and lake ==
The Dongting Plain is usually referred to as a lake because it sometimes expanded to become a single body of water.

The Dongting Lake catchment area is 257,000 km^{2} (99,000 mi^{2}). The lake's only outlet is a natural channel 14 km long and on average 1 km wide.

There are five main rivers in the catchment (excluding the area whose water flows directly into the Yangtze River, the same hereafter):

- Xiang, from the south;
- Zi, from the southwest;
- Yuan, from the west;
- Lishui, from the north;
- Miluo, from the east.

All of these rivers flow directly into the lake. In addition, some of water of the Yangtze River also flows into the lake through the Sankou distributary channels.

The catchment has highly complex flow regimes featuring strong river-lake interactions. Dongting Lake receives water from the upper Jingjiang reach of the Yangtze River. The water in Dongting Lake finally flows into the lower Jingjiang reach of the Yangtze River at the Chenglingji Station and discharges downstream. The water in Dongting Lake mainly comes from surface runoff and direct rainfall on the lake surface. The Dongting Lake catchment begins to enter the rainy season in April and the rainfall reaches its maximum in June. Then, the rainy area moves to the upper part of the Yangtze River Basin in July and flood water flowing into the lake from upstream increases significantly. The rainy season may continue until the end of September. The flow regime of Dongting Lake maintains the same temporal pattern as the rainfall regime.

The flood season is from April to September. In general, flood water comes mainly from the catchment from April to June and from water diversion of the upper reaches of the Yangtze River from July to September.

The annual runoff from Dongting Lake to the Yangtze River is 278.6 km^{3}/a (8,830 m^{3}/s), of which to 92.3 km^{3}/a (2,920 m^{3}/s) is received from the Yangtze River through the inlets. Influenced by the monsoon, the lake shows a significant seasonal change in its flow regime. The lake water level fluctuates dramatically throughout a year, up to 12.9 m (42 ft). The water surface area also varies with the fluctuation of the water level from thousands of square kilometers in the flood season to only a few hundred square kilometers in the dry season.

== History ==
The earliest rice paddies yet discovered in the world were in the Liyang plain, which was then on the western edge of Dongting lake. The state of Chu occupied the region in the Eastern Zhou period, and its territory there was taken over by Qin in the 3rd century BCE. During the Han dynasty, Yunmeng Marsh (雲夢大澤; Yúnmèng dàzé literally "Great Marsh of Cloud Dream"), which lies to the north of Dongting Lake in Hubei Province, served as the main flood basin of the Yangtze. The rich sediment of the marsh attracted farmers. As embankments were built along the north bank of the Yangtze River, floodwaters that would previously have accumulated there were diverted southwards into Dongting Lake. This means that the large size of Dongting Lake was increasingly the result of human activity.

At that time, Dongting Lake was China's largest freshwater lake. Because of its size, it gained the name Eight-hundred-li-Dongting (八百里洞庭). Nowadays, it is the second-largest, after Poyang Lake, as much of the lake has been turned into farmland. The development of the center of the basis into polders resulred in east and south Dongting lakes.

== Culture and mythology ==
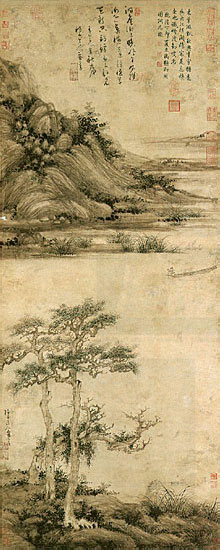
Hermit Fisherman on Lake Dongting, by Wu Zhen (1287–1354)

The area is well known in Chinese history and literature. "Dongting" literally means "Grotto Court", and the lake was named for the huge hall or cavern, which was believed to exist beneath the lake, where the spirits of the Sage-King Shun's wives Ehuang and Nüying were said to be the rulers of this grotto, which was claimed to have underground passages opening to all parts of the empire. Dragon boat racing is said to have begun on the eastern shores of Dongting Lake as a search for the body of Qu Yuan, the Chu poet (340–278 BC), and a dragon-king is said to live at the bottom of the lake.

The scenery of the Jiuyi Mountains and of the Xiao and Xiang rivers below is often mentioned in Chinese poetry. The late Tang dynasty poet Yu Wuling is supposed to have been fond of the scenery of Dongting Lake. During the Song dynasty, it became the fashion to paint this region's scenery in a set of eight scenes, usually entitled Eight Views of Xiaoxiang. It is also said that Han Shizhong settled in the region after retiring from military service. The fashion spread to Japan, where eventually other famous places were substituted for the Xiao and Xiang rivers. One of the famous ponds based on the geography of the lake is at the Daikaku-ji in Kyoto.

Qu Yuan traveled by boat from Dongting Lake to Nanhu Lake and the Canglong River (also known as the Wangjia River), journeying through the heartland of Baling. When his boat reached Jiazi Mountain, he saw the mountain covered in bright yellow oranges. He joyfully climbed the mountain and wrote the famous poem "Ode to the Orange" (橘颂). Later generations built the Orange Ode Pavilion on Jiazi Mountain in Yueyang City to commemorate Qu Yuan.

Junshan was also named after the goddess-wives of Shun, who lived there after his death by drowning, while they mourned him and sought for his body all the way from the source of the Xiang River, in which he drowned, and then on down to where it could have drifted, into the lake. Junshan Island, a former Taoist retreat, is a famous 1 km (0.62 mi)-wide island with 72 peaks in the middle of the lake. The island is also famous for its Junshan Yinzhen tea. The basin of Dongting Lake and its surrounding area is famous for its scenic beauty.

During Emperor Shun's southern tour, he sought to bring enlightenment through music. He is credited with composing the renowned Shao Music (韶乐), a series of ceremonial compositions believed to elevate the spirit and harmonize the natural world. During one journey, Shun arrived at Phoenix Mountain (鳳凰山), located along the shores of Dongting Lake in present-day Hunan Province.

Moved by the natural beauty of the landscape, Shun ascended the mountain and gazed out over the vast lake. There, he personally performed the Shao Music. As he reached the ninth movement, an extraordinary phenomenon occurred: a dragon emerged from the depths of Dongting Lake and began to soar among the clouds, while a phoenix appeared gracefully gliding over the lake's surface. The two mythical creatures—symbols of cosmic balance and imperial authority—danced in harmony to the rhythm of Shun's music.

Witnessing this scene, Shun's loyal minister Cangshu (倉舒) exclaimed:

"This is a sign of the dragon and phoenix bringing prosperity! When the dragon appears, there will be favorable weather and abundant harvests; when the phoenix arrives, the nation will be at peace and the people will be blessed."

— Cangshu

The spectacle was interpreted as a divine omen, symbolizing unity between Heaven and Earth. Since then, the phrase "dragon and phoenix bringing prosperity" (龍鳳呈祥) has been used in Chinese culture as a traditional expression of good fortune, national peace, and bountiful harvests.

=== The Carp Leaps Over the Dragon Gate ===
According to legend, the immortal Lü Dongbin once passed by Dongting Lake and decided to enlighten the aquatic creatures dwelling within its waters. Upon hearing of his arrival, the fish of the lake gathered to see him. To test their worthiness, Lü Dongbin set a condition for enlightenment: he commanded the dragon he was riding to form a Dragon Gate. Any creature that could leap over this gate would be transformed into a dragon and granted immortality. Eager to ascend, the fish tried one by one to leap over the gate. However, the Dragon Gate stood far too high, and despite their efforts, each fell back into the lake, injured and defeated.

Among them was a large red carp, residing more than a mile away. Upon hearing of the challenge, it swam swiftly toward the site. Summoning all its strength, the carp launched itself like an arrow shot from a bow. Amidst swirling wind and rain, it soared high into the air above Dongting Lake, successfully clearing the Dragon Gate before plunging back into the water. In the blink of an eye, the carp transformed into a majestic dragon.

=== The Pearl Maiden and the Ninth Dragon Son ===
According to local folklore, an immortal clam residing in Dongting Lake, said to be ten thousand years old, produced an offspring known as the Pearl Maiden. She was distinguished among the lake's aquatic population for her exceptional beauty, as well as her notable kindness, intelligence, and hardworking character. The narrative takes a dramatic turn with the introduction of the Bashe, a grotesque and malevolent water monster who became infatuated with the Pearl Maiden and made persistent attempts to force her into marriage. The maiden, however, had already given her heart to the Ninth Dragon Son, who was the youngest son of the region's Dragon King. The prince was a popular figure, respected for his courage, pleasant demeanor, and helpfulness.

The monster reacted to the Pearl Maiden's polite but firm rejection with violent fury. It created a massive storm on the lake and began to consume both the local fauna and human populations. In response to this crisis, the Dragon King orchestrated a two-part solution: he instructed his son and the Pearl Maiden to hide near the Wangjia River while simultaneously summoning the mythological hero Hou Yi to subdue the monster. Hou Yi successfully neutralized the threat, first by striking Bashe with an arrow and then slaying it. The creature's remains are said to have formed a hill that is now known as Baling. The Ninth Dragon Son and the Pearl Maiden ultimately chose to remain by the Wangjia River, where they fell in love and raised a child, preferring a peaceful life over a return to the Dongting Dragon Palace. Over time, the Pearl Maiden transformed into Pearl Mountain, while the Ninth Dragon Son became the Canglong River (also known as the Wangjia River), and they remain together, watching over one another for all time.

== Environmental issues ==
The agricultural colonization of the region began in ancient times, and by the 19th century much of the lake's shallower areas had been destroyed to create farmland. After 1949 a new round of wetland drainage destroyed much of what remained, leaving only a fraction of the original wetland intact, though some of that area has subsequently been returned to wetland conditions. Nonetheless, along with Poyang Lake, it remains one of the largest lakes in China, and is an important wintering area for migratory birds. It has been designated as a protected Ramsar site since 1992.

In 2007, fears were expressed that China's finless porpoise, a native of the lake, might follow the baiji, the Yangtze river dolphin, into extinction. There have been calls for action to save the finless porpoise, of which there are about 1400 left living, with approximately 700 to 900 in the Yangtze, and approximately another 500 in Poyang and Dongting Lakes. The 2007 population levels were less than half the 1997 levels, and the population continues to drop at a rate of 7.3 per cent per year. Pressure on the finless porpoise population on Poyang Lake comes from the high numbers of ships passing through, as well as sand dredging.

After flooding of the Yangtze River in late June 2007, approximately 2 billion reed voles were displaced from the islands of the lake when water was released from the Three Gorges Dam to control the excess. The rodents invaded surrounding communities, damaging crops and dikes and forcing the government to construct walls and ditches to control the population. Reduced populations of predators such as snakes and owls worsened the overpopulation of rodents. Villagers killed an estimated 2 million mice by beating them to death or using poisons.

A restoration project, the Sino-Norwegian Project of Biodiversity Protection Management, began in 2005. According to a 2007 article in the China Daily, "[The Dongting Lake area] will be restored to a sustainable biodiversity environment within five to 10 years".

== Major cities on the lake ==
- Yiyang
- Yueyang
- Changde

== See also ==
- Eight Views of Xiaoxiang
- Emperor Shun
- Hunan
- Junshan Island
- Spotted bamboo
- Xiang River
- Xiang River goddesses
- Xiaoxiang
- Xiaoxiang poetry
- Yangzi River
