= Han Wo =

Chinese poet of the Tang and Min dynasty

- Traditional Chinese: 韓偓
- Simplified Chinese: 韩偓
Transcriptions
Standard Mandarin
- Hanyu Pinyin: Hán Wò
- Wade–Giles: Han^{2} Wo^{4}

Courtesy name: Zhiyao
- Traditional Chinese: 致堯
- Simplified Chinese: 致尧
Transcriptions
Standard Mandarin
- Hanyu Pinyin: Zhìyáo
- Wade–Giles: Chih^{4}-yao^{2}

Art name: Yushan-Qiaoren
- Chinese: 玉山樵人
Transcriptions
Standard Mandarin
- Hanyu Pinyin: yùshān-qiáorén
- Wade–Giles: yü^{4}shan^{1}-ch'iao^{2}jên^{2}

Possible alternate courtesy name: Zhiguang
- Chinese: 致光
Transcriptions
Standard Mandarin
- Hanyu Pinyin: Zhìguāng
- Wade–Giles: Chih^{4}-kuang^{1}

Possible alternate courtesy name: Zhiyuan
- Chinese: 致元
Transcriptions
Standard Mandarin
- Hanyu Pinyin: Zhìyuán
- Wade–Giles: Chih^{4}-yüan^{2}

Han Wo (c. 842–844 – c. 923) was a Chinese poet of the late Tang dynasty and the Min state. His courtesy name was Zhiyao, or possibly Zhiguang or Zhiyuan, and his art name was Yushan-Qiaoren. He was a native of Jingzhao, in or near the capital Chang'an. An anthology of his poems, the Xianglian Ji survives.

== Biography ==
=== Sources ===
Chapter 183 of the New Book of Tang gives a short biography of Han Wo.

=== Birth and early life ===
He was born in either 842 or 844. (Note: Ueki, Uno & Matsubara (1999, p. 148) give "842?", while Noguchi (1994), Arai (1998) and Daijirin (2006) give 844.) He was a native of Wannian, Jingzhao (modern-day Xi'an, Shaanxi Province). His father, Han Zhan (traditional Chinese: 韓瞻; simplified Chinese: 韩瞻; pinyin: Hán Zhān; Wade–Giles: Han^{2} Chan^{1}) took the imperial examination in the same year as Li Shangyin, who was also connected to Wo's family through marriage. The young Wo supposedly was recognized for his poetic genius by Li, who praised him.

=== Political career ===
In 889 (Longji 1) he passed the imperial examination, receiving his Jinshi degree. He became a scholar at the Hanlin Academy and a low-ranking official at the Central Secretariat, eventually becoming Vice-Minister of Defense (兵部侍郎). He earned the trust of Emperor Zhaozong, working with him against the eunuchs, and was recommended for the position of chancellor, but he was disliked by Zhu Quanzhong (later to become Emperor Daizu of Liao) and was therefore exiled to Pu Prefecture (modern Fan County, Henan).

=== Later life and death ===
Following his exile, Han did not return to government, and spent his last years in the Min Kingdom. He died around 923, (Note: Noguchi (1994), Arai (1998) and Daijirin (2006) all give 923 as the year of his death, while Ueki, Uno & Matsubara (1999, p. 148) give the same date with a question mark.) having never returned to the capital.

== Names ==
=== Courtesy name ===
His courtesy name was either Zhiyao or Zhiguang, or possibly Zhiyuan.

The New Book of Tang, as well as a work by Han's contemporary Wu Rong, refer to him as Zhiguang, but the Liexian Zhuan associates the character used in his given name Wo with the second character of Zhiyao, lending support to the idea that Zhiguang would have fit his given name better. Both the Tang Cai Zi Zhuan and the Tangshi Jishi (唐詩紀事) give his courtesy name as Zhiyao. The theory that his courtesy name was Zhiyuan relies on the Tiao xi yu yin cong hua.

=== Art name ===
His art name was Yushan-Qiaoren.

== Poetry ==
In literary history, Han is generally considered a poet of the so-called late Tang period, which spanned the early-ninth century to 907.

An anthology of his poems, the Xianglian Ji (traditional Chinese: 香奩集; simplified Chinese: 香奁集; pinyin: xiānglián jí; Wade–Giles: hsiang^{1}-lien^{2} chih^{2}), survives. His poetry is noted for its sensual beauty, with the Xianglian Ji having given its name to xianglian-ti (traditional Chinese: 香奩體; simplified Chinese: 香奁体; pinyin: xiānglián tǐ; Wade–Giles: hsiang^{1}-lien^{2} t'ih^{3}), a style of poetry associated with him. His poems of other types are collected in the Yushan-Qiaoren Ji (Chinese: 玉山樵人集; pinyin: yùshān-qiáorén jí; Wade–Giles: yü^{4}shan^{1}-ch'iao^{2}jên^{2} chih^{2}).

== Reception ==
His poetry influenced the work of the fourteenth-century poet Yang Weizhen.

== Works cited ==
- Arai, Ken (1998). "Han Wo (Kan Aku in Japanese)". World Encyclopedia (in Japanese). Heibonsha.
- Chen Fumika. "第一章 韓偓の事蹟に關する再考證" [Chapter 1 Reconsideration of Han Wo]. 森春濤の香奩體詩受容と漢詩創作 ―― 韓偓の香奩詩から森春濤の艷體詩へ [Acceptance of incense poetry by Haruo Mori and creation of Chinese poetry--From Han Wo's incense poem to Moriharu's poem] (PDF) (Thesis) (in Japanese). Archived from the original (PDF) on 2017-10-22.
- "Han Wo (Kan Aku in Japanese)". Daijirin (in Japanese). Sanseidō. 2006.
- Kawai, Kōzō (1975). "Kan Aku (844-923): Shin Tō Sho kan 183". In Ogawa, Tamaki (ed.). Tōdai no Shijin: Sono Denki. Tokyo: Taishūkan Shoten. pp. 612–625.
- Noguchi, Kazuo (1994). "Han Wo (Kan Aku in Japanese)". Encyclopedia Nipponica (in Japanese). Shogakukan.
- Ueki, Hisayuki; Uno, Naoto; Matsubara, Akira (1999). "Shijin to Shi no Shōgai (Kan Aku)". In Matsuura, Tomohisa (ed.). Kanshi no Jiten 漢詩の事典 (in Japanese). Vol. 1. Tokyo: Taishūkan Shoten. pp. 148–149. OCLC 41025662.
- Wixted, John Timothy (2001). "Chapter 19: Poetry of the Fourteenth Century". In Mair, Victor H. (ed.). The Columbia History of Chinese Literature. New York: Columbia University Press. ISBN 0-231-10984-9.
