= Junshan Island =

Island in Hunan province in China

Native name: 君山島
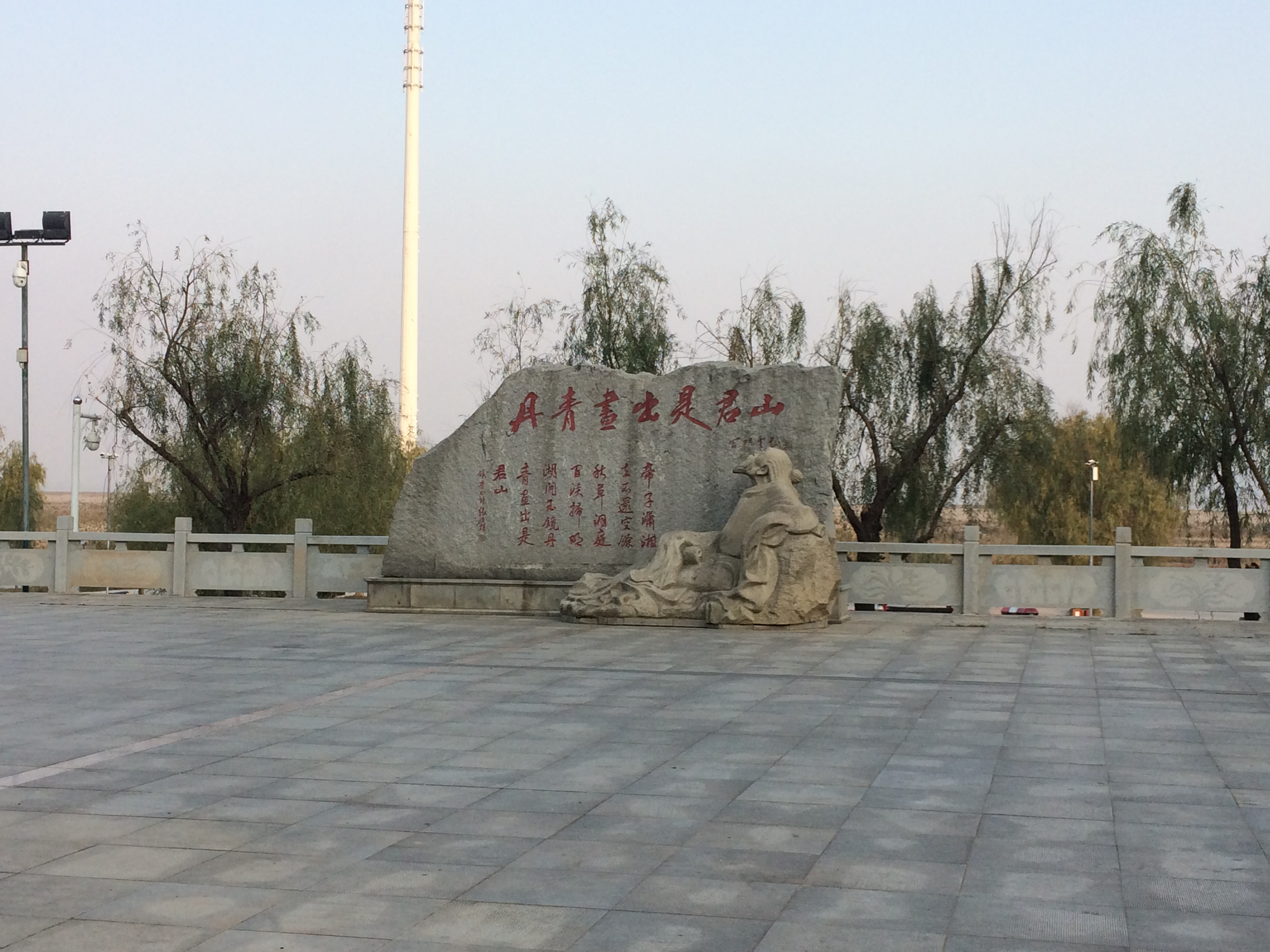
- A stele in Junshan Island.

- Location within Hunan Location within China

Geography
- Location: Dongting Lake, Yueyang, Hunan
- Coordinates: 29°21′18″N 113°00′09″E
- Area: 0.96 km^{2} (0.37 sq mi)
- Highest elevation: 55 m (180 ft)

Administration
- China

Demographics
- Population: 100 (administrators)
- Languages: Mandarin; Xiang
- Ethnic groups: Han Chinese

Additional information

Chinese name
- Chinese: 君山島
Transcriptions
Standard Mandarin
- Hanyu Pinyin: Jūnshān Dǎo

Junshan Island (simplified Chinese: 君山岛; traditional Chinese: 君山島; pinyin: Jūnshān Dǎo; lit. 'Jun Mountain Island') is an island in Hunan province in China on Dongting Lake. The name derives from the legend of the Xiang River goddesses. It is 0.96 km^{2} (0.37 sq mi) in area. It was formerly a Daoist retreat.

== History ==
Junshan Island consists of 72 peaks on an oval island in Dongting Lake. It was initially called "Mount Xiang" (湘山) in ancient times, also referred to as "Mount Dongting" (洞庭山).

Junshan Island is full of historical sites such as the Tomb of Xiangfei (湘妃墓). Legend said that 4,000 years ago during Emperor Shun's inspection visit in the south, two concubines named "Ehuang" (娥皇) and "Nüying" (女英) followed him to Dongting Lake, but they were stopped by stormy weather. When they heard that Emperor Shun had died suddenly they cried so bitterly that their teardrops turned the bamboo into mottled bamboo. Soon they died of overwhelming sadness and locals built a tomb on Junshan Island to commemorate them.

== Attractions ==
- Feilai Bell
- Junshan Garden of Love
- Liu Yi Well
- Tomb of Xiangfei
- Xiangfei Ancestral Temple
- Xiaoyao Palace

== Literature ==
Li Bai, a poet of the Tang dynasty (618–907), wrote: "淡掃明湖開玉鏡，丹靑畫出是君山". Liu Yuxi, another poet of the Tang dynasty, eulogized: "遥望洞庭山水翠，白銀盤裏一靑螺".

== Speciality ==
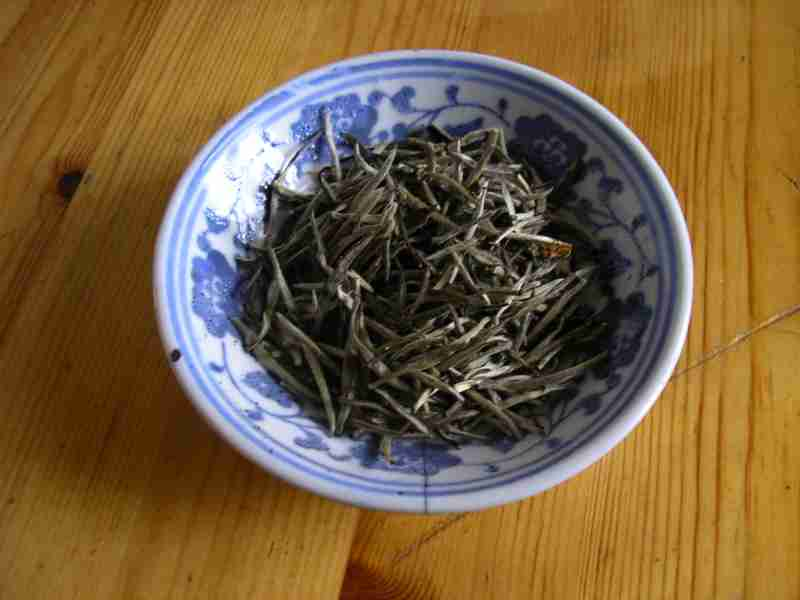
Junshan Silver Needle Tea.

Junshan Island produces a lot of local specialities among which the most famous is Junshan Silver Needle Tea (君山銀針茶) also known as "Gold Inlaid Jade" (金鑲玉). The tea was listed as a tribute to the imperial family in the Tang dynasty (618–907). The golden tea leaves narrow and thin as needles, are wrapped by a layer of white filaments. When the tea is being brewed, tea leaves first float up to the top and then sink to the bottom in a vertical position as if they were swords standing upward creating a peculiar phenomenon in the tea cup.
