= Baihao Yinzhen =

Chinese white tea

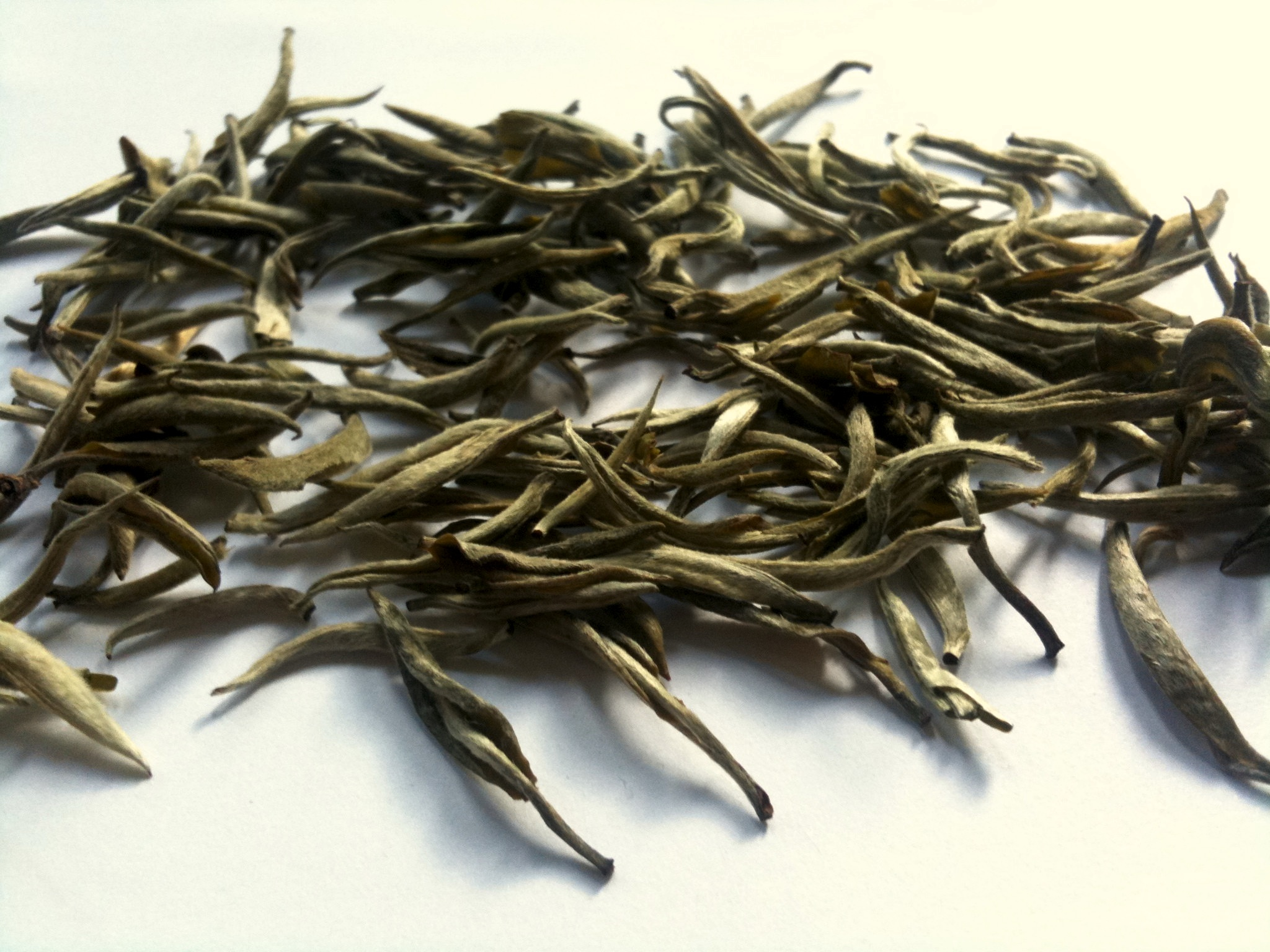
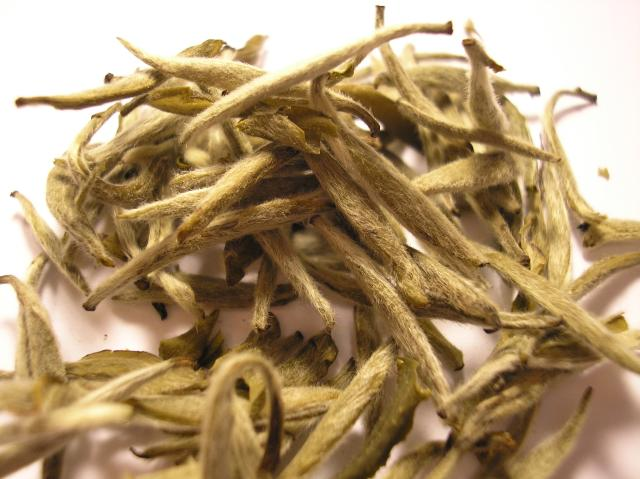
- Type: White
- Other names: Silver Needle; White Hair Silver Needle; Yinzhen
- Origin: Fuding and Zhenghe counties, Fujian Province
- Quick description: The highest grade of White tea, Bai Hao Yin Zhen, should be fleshy, bright colored and covered with tiny white hairs.

Baihao Yinzhen (simplified Chinese: 白毫银针; traditional Chinese: 白毫銀針; pinyin: báiháo yínzhēn; Wade–Giles: bai^{2}-hao^{2} yin^{2}-chên^{1}; pronounced [pǎɪ.xǎʊ ǐn.ʈʂə́n]), also known as White Hair Silver Needle, is a white tea produced in Fujian Province in China. Amongst white teas, this is the most expensive variety and the most prized, as only top buds (leaf shoot) of the Camellia sinensis plant are used to produce the tea. Genuine Silver Needles are made from cultivars of the Da Bai (Large White) tea tree family. There are other productions that look similar with downy leaf shoots but most are green teas, and as green teas, they taste differently and have a different biochemical potency than the genuine white tea Silver Needle. It is commonly included among China's famous teas.

== Possible origins ==
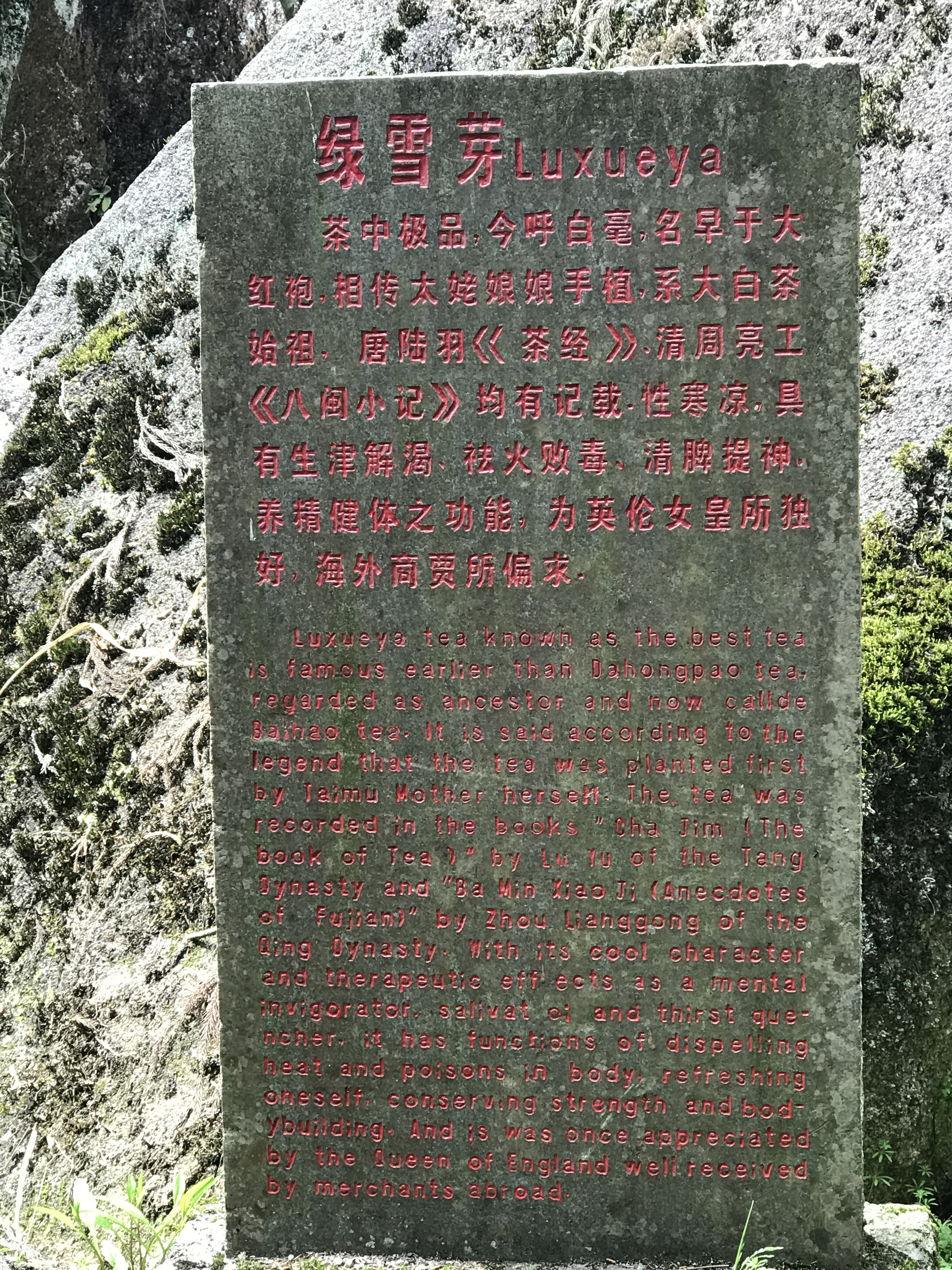
A sign describing Lüxueya, an ancestor of white tea, at Taimu Mountain, Fuding, Fujian Province

In the early years of Jiaqing in the Qing Dynasty (AD 1796), Baihao Yinzhen was successfully cultivated from vegetable tea in Fuding. The export of Baihao Yinzhen started in 1891. Baihao Yinzhen used to be called Lüxueya (绿雪芽, literally "green snow shoots"), which is regarded as the ancestor of white tea. The mother tree is planted in Hongxue Cave on Taimu Mountain in Fuding.

== Plantation ==
Fuding, located in the northeast of Fujian Province, has mild and warm climate and plenty of rainfall. Perennial mean temperature is 18.4 °C. It is surrounded by hills on 3 sides and the East China Sea on 1 side. The position is 26°52′～27°26′ north, 119°55′～120°43′ east.

== Production ==
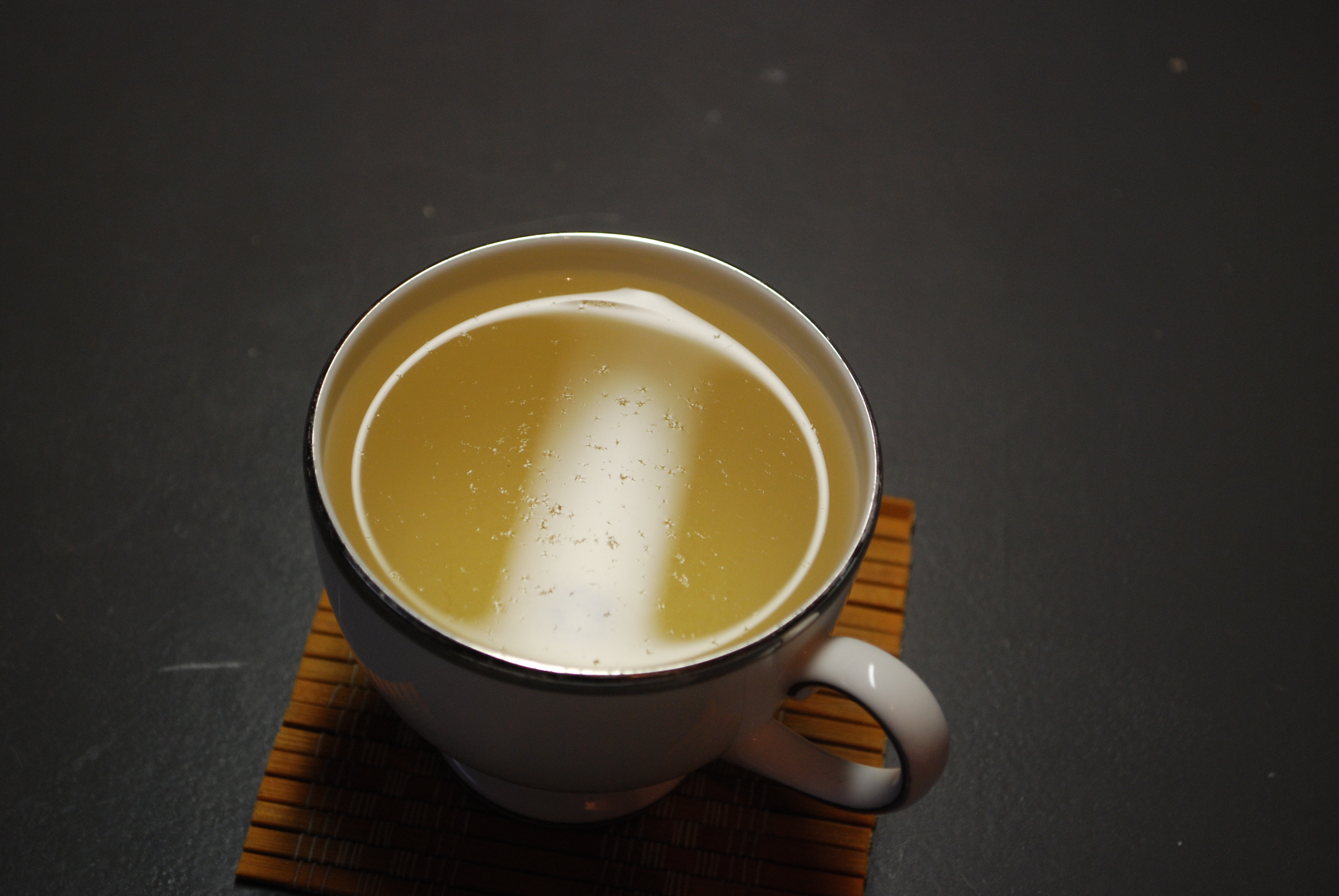
The fleshy hairs are visible, a unique characteristic of the Silver Needle White Tea

A genuine Silver Needle is a white tea. As such, it is only lightly oxidized. The most sought after productions are from the first flushes, which generally take place between late March to early April, when the year's first new buds "flush". For the production of Silver Needle, only the leaf shoots, i.e. the leaf buds before opening, are plucked. Unlike the plucking of green tea, the ideal time and weather for plucking white tea is a sunny morning when the sun is high enough to have dried any remaining moisture on the buds.

Traditionally, the plucks are laid in shallow baskets to wilt under the sun for an extended period, and the best quality produced today are still made this way. To avoid loss due to sudden rain, gusts, or other accidents, some producers are taking the plucks indoors to wilt in a chamber with artificial warm air flow. The softened shoots are then piled for the required enzyme oxidation (often incorrectly referred to as fermentation) before they are taken for a low temperature bake-dry.

Two regions, Zhenghe and Fuding, spanning the north to north-eastern parts of the Fujian province are the major and original producers of this tea, although neighboring counties have also been producing. The two major cultivars employed by these regions are Fuding Da Bai and Zhenghe Da Bai, named after their origins. These differences are important to distinguish the two major styles of Silver Needles—the Zhenghe style and the Fuding style. The former is usually a lot darker, with significantly longer piled-up time for oxidation, yielding a tea with fuller body than the latter style, which is generally lighter with shorter oxidation. The character of the tea tree leaves of the former allows for the extended piled-up time without turning bad. Both styles have their own group of followers, as taste is a rather personal preference.

Baihao Yinzhen can be harvested in spring, summer and autumn. Spring tea has the highest quality and most abundant which makes up half of annual production.

== Process ==
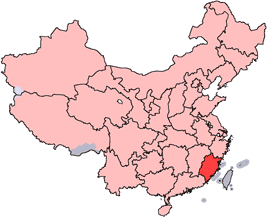
Baihao Yinzhen is grown in Fujian province, China.

=== Hand-picking ===
Baihao Yinzhen is the tender bud of the white tea. It needs to be picked up before the buds open. Tea planters pick the leaves straight from the tea bush and put them into the baskets on dry sunny days.

=== Withering (sun drying) ===
The withering of white tea leaves is a natural process which requires the tea workers to use their real skills. The freshly picked leaves and buds are left in a dormant state for a maximum of 3 days to have them dried thoroughly.

=== Dehydrating ===
Drying the Baihao Yinzhen is a complicated step. The process has a strict range of temperature and workers’ skills. If the temperature fails to be in the specific range, Baihao Yinzhen will lose its unique taste.

== Brewing ==
As with all white teas, it is best prepared with water below boiling (at around 75 to 80 degrees Celsius or 167 to 176 degrees Fahrenheit) and produces a slightly viscous glittering pale yellow color with evidence of floating white hairs that reflect light. Baihao Yinzhen is said to smell of "fresh-cut hay", and the flavour is described as sweet, vegetal, and delicate. Steeping should be longer than other white teas; up to 5 minutes per brew, and the volume of tea to be used can be higher. There are few parallels to be drawn as the taste is not similar to any other teas but Bai Mu Dan, except the latter is fuller but not as sweet and delicate.

== Storage ==
Baihao Yinzhen needs to be stored with a lower amount of moisture. If the bud turns into powder after squeezing it, it means the amount of humidity is low enough. If not, the tea needs to be brewed as soon as possible. Tinfoil cylinders, porcelains, and tinted glass bottles are the best containers for Baihao Yinzhen. Cans, wooden boxes and bamboo boxes are also acceptable. Baihao Yinzhen should be stored in dry and clean containers and a ventilated area. Also, the tea cannot be stored alongside things with strong smells like camphor, medicines, cosmetics, and detergents.

== See also ==
- Bai Mu Dan tea
- Shoumei tea
- Ceylon tea (white)
- Darjeeling tea (white)
