= Tang Cai Zi Zhuan =

Collection of biographies of Chinese poets

The Tang Cai Zi Zhuan (simplified Chinese: 唐才子传; traditional Chinese: 唐才子傳; pinyin: Táng Cái Zǐ Zhuán; Wade–Giles: Tang^{3} Tsai^{1} Tzu^{3} Chuan^{1}) is a Chinese collection of biographies of poets of the Tang Dynasty.

== Compiler and date ==
It was compiled by the Yuan dynasty figure Xin Wenfang.

== Contents ==
It is in ten volumes, and contains biographies of 278 poets.

== Textual tradition ==
The work was lost in China from the mid-Ming dynasty. It was, however, copied in Japan at the Five Mountains, and that text was later reexported back to China at the end of the Qing dynasty.

== Works cited ==
- Satō, Tamotsu (1994). "Tang Cai Zi Zhuan (Tō sai shi den in Japanese)". Encyclopedia Nipponica (in Japanese). Shogakukan.
