= White tea =

Tea from the Camellia sinensis plant

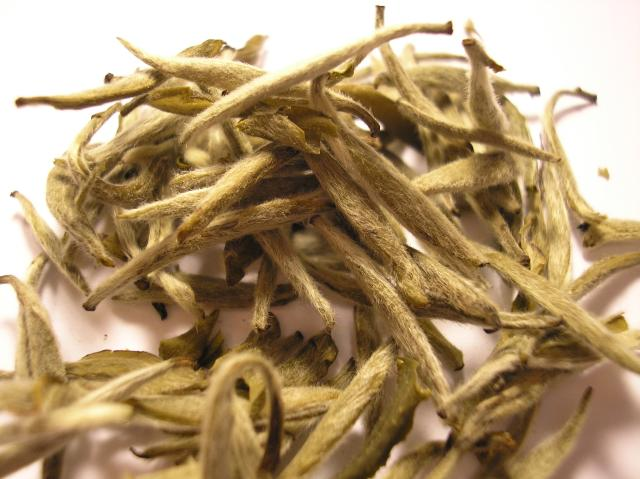
- White Bai Hao Yinzhen tea leaves
- Chinese: 白茶
- Literal meaning: White tea
Transcriptions
Standard Mandarin
- Hanyu Pinyin: báichá
- IPA: [pǎɪʈʂʰǎ]
Yue: Cantonese
- Yale Romanization: baahk-chàh
- Jyutping: baak^{6}-caa^{4}
- IPA: [pak̚˨.tsʰa˩]
Southern Min
- Tâi-lô: pe̍eh-têe

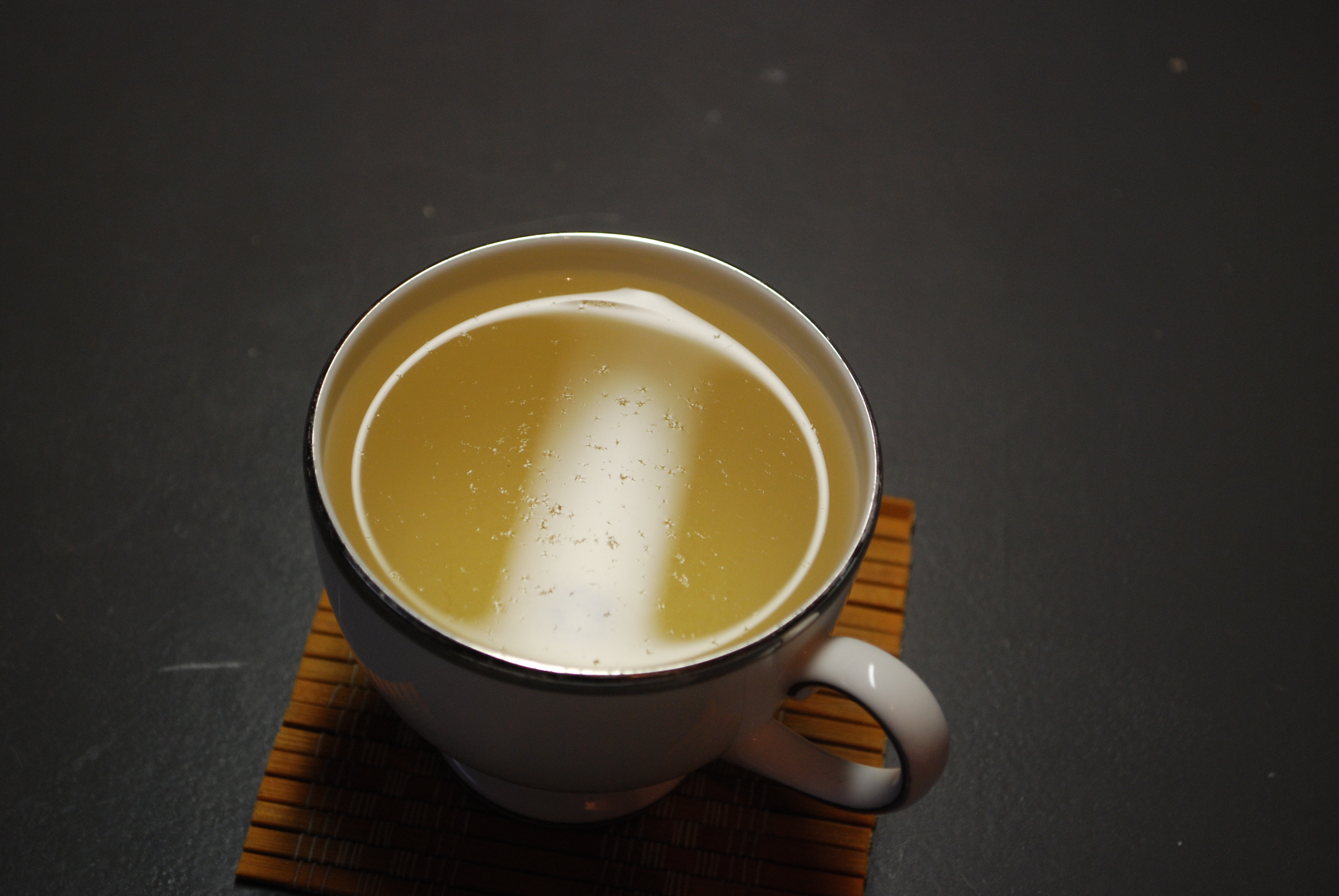
The visible white hairs are a unique characteristic of many white teas

White tea may refer to one of several styles of tea which generally feature young or minimally processed leaves of the Camellia sinensis plant.

Currently there is no generally accepted definition of white tea and very little international agreement on how it can be defined. Some sources use the term to refer to tea that is merely dried with no additional processing. Therefore, white tea is very close to the natural state of the tea plant. Other sources use the term to refer to tea made from the buds and immature tea leaves picked shortly before the buds have fully opened and traditionally allowed to wither and dry under the sun, while others include tea buds and very young leaves which have been steamed or fired before drying. Most definitions agree, however, that white tea is not rolled or oxidized, resulting in a flavor characterized as lighter than that of most green or traditional black teas.

In spite of its name, brewed white tea is pale yellow. Its name derives from the fine silvery-white hairs on the unopened buds of the tea plant, which give the plant a whitish appearance. The unopened buds are used for some types of white tea.

It is produced primarily in China, mostly in the Fujian province, but more recently also in Taiwan, Eastern Nepal, Thailand, Galle (Southern Sri Lanka) and northeast India.

== History ==
What is today known as white tea may have come into creation in the last two centuries; scholars and tea merchants generally disagree as to when the first production of white tea (as it is understood in China today) began. White tea may have first appeared in English publication in 1876, where it was categorized as a black tea, because the leaves are not steamed first as in the making of green tea in order to denature intrinsic oxidative enzymes.

White tea is often sold as Silvery Tip Pekoe in the style of the tea leaf grading system, as well as under the simple designations China White and Fujian White.

Some tea from the related wild Camellia taliensis in Yunnan is made using white tea processing techniques.

== Composition ==
White tea, like black and green tea, is made from the Camellia sinensis plant and contains polyphenols, a set of phytonutrients that are thought to be responsible for the health effects of tea. Different white teas have different amounts of catechins, a category of polyphenols, and the overall range of concentrations overlaps with that of green tea, meaning that some white teas have the same concentration of polyphenols as some green teas. This may be due to the variety of the tea plant from which the tea was picked, the cultivation technique, and the way in which the tea was processed.

=== Caffeine content ===
The caffeine content of tea depends on many factors, including the type of tea and the brewing method. Estimates for the caffeine content of a cup of brewed white tea range widely, from less than 10 mg to over 50 mg, with some studies concluding that white tea tends to have less caffeine than green tea. For comparison, according to the U.S. Department of Agriculture, an 8 US fl oz (240 mL) cup of brewed black tea contains 47 mg caffeine, green tea contains about 29 mg caffeine, and oolong tea contains about 38 mg caffeine. Due to the wide variability of the caffeine content in brewed tea, some studies have failed to prove a relationship between the variety of tea and the caffeine content.

== Manufacturing ==
The base process for manufacturing white tea is as follows:

Fresh tea leaf → withering → drying (air drying, solar drying or mechanical drying) → white tea

White tea belongs to the group of tea that does not require panning, rolling or shaking. However, the selection of raw material in white tea manufacture is extremely stringent; only the plucking of young tea leaves with much fine hair can produce good-quality white tea of a high pekoe (grading) value.

=== Plucking style ===
Chinese white teas are traditionally categorized into a four-level hierarchy of quality. The first, and highest quality, Baihao Yinzhen, is just the bud of the tea plant. Bai Mudan white tea is typically composed of one bud and two leaves. Gongmei white tea is similar to Bai Mudan, but includes three to four leaves. The lowest grade of white tea, Shoumei, has many leaves and few buds.

== Popular types of white tea ==
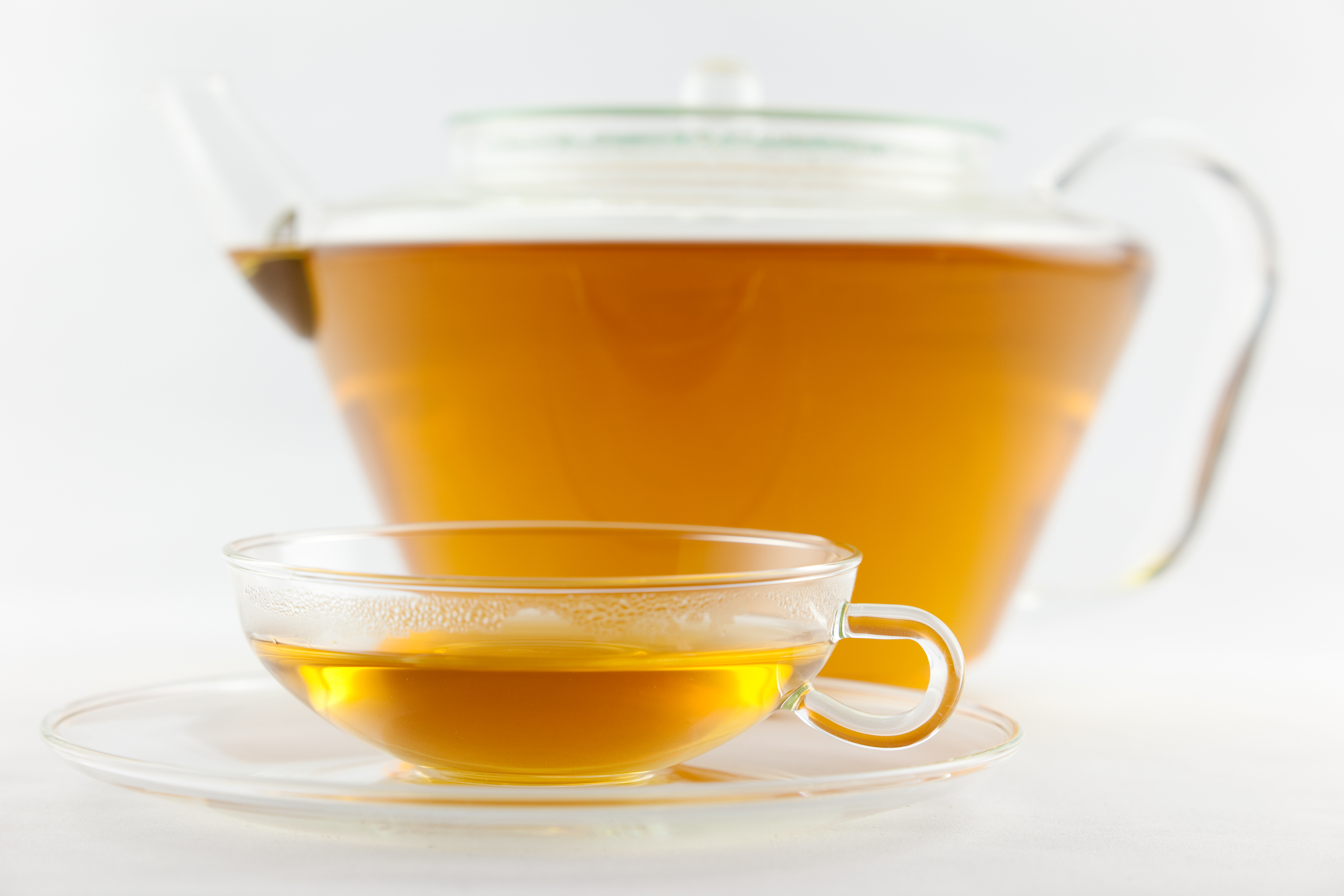
A glass of White peony

The three main classes of Chinese white tea are:

- Longevity Eyebrow (shòu méi) - typically these whites have no buds
- White peony (bái mǔdān): white teas that include some buds mixed in with the leaves
- Silver Needle (báiháo yínzhēn) - only buds are included in these teas

There are also other whites such as:

- Ya Bao, a white tea made entirely of buds, from Yunnan
- Yue guan bai ("moonlight white"), these teas are supposedly dried under the moonlight rather than the sun

There are also other white teas grown in other regions, such as in the Himalayan region. White Darjeeling teas are one such type of Himalayan white.
