= Zhejiang Anji High Middle School =

School in Anji County, China

Zhejiang Anji High Middle School (浙江 安吉 高级 中学 Zhè-jiāng ān-jí gāo-jí zhōng-xué) is located in east of Dipu (递铺), central town of Anji (安吉).

Since its foundation in August 1998, it has been one of the key high middle schools in Zhejiang. The whole campus covers about 30 acres (120,000 m^{2}) and the building covers 38,000 square meters.

The school, known locally as Angao (安高, short for 安吉高级中学), has 42 classes and around 1,700 students as of July 2014.
