= Daxi Creek =

Coordinates: 30°31′03″N 119°37′00″E

Daxi

Location
- Country: China

Physical characteristics
- Mouth
  - location: Xitiao River near Huzhou, Anji County of Zhejiang Province, China

The Daxi Creek (Chinese: 大溪) is a tributary of the Xitiao River in Anji County of Zhejiang Province, China. It is interrupted by the Tianhuangping Dam.
