= Yellow tea =

Variety of tea

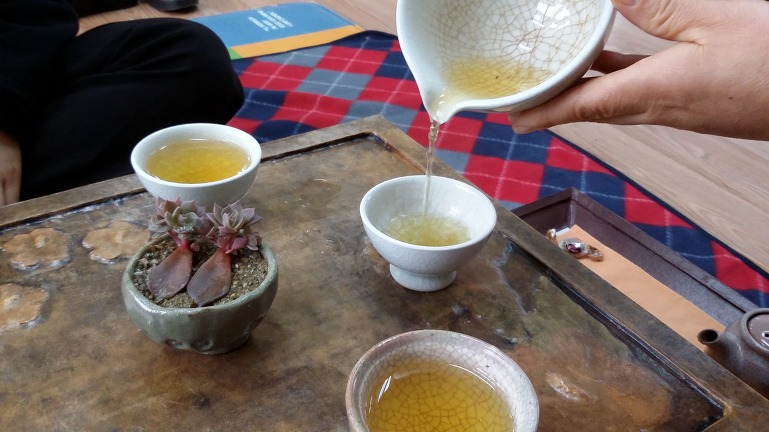
- Type: Tea
- Origin: China, East Asia
- Color: Yellow
- Ingredients: Tea leaves
- Related products: Tea

Yellow tea is a particular lightly oxidized tea, either Chinese huángchá (黄茶; 黃茶) and Korean hwangcha (황차; 黃茶).

== Chinese huángchá ==
Chinese name
- Traditional Chinese: 黃茶
- Simplified Chinese: 黄茶
- Literal meaning: Yellow tea
Transcriptions
Standard Mandarin
- Hanyu Pinyin: huángchá
- Wade–Giles: huang2-ch'a2
- IPA: [xwǎŋ.ʈʂʰǎ]
Hakka
- Romanization: vòng-chhà

Huángchá is increasingly rare and expensive. The process for making it is similar to that of green tea but with an added step of encasing, or sweltering, (Note: Unique to yellow teas, warm and damp tea leaves from after kill-green are allowed to be lightly heated in a closed container, which causes the previously green leaves to turn yellow. The resulting leaves produce a beverage that has a distinctive yellowish-green hue due to transformations of the leaf chlorophyll. Through being sweltered for 6–8 hours at close to human body temperatures, the amino acids and polyphenols in the processed tea leaves undergo chemical changes to give this tea its distinct briskness and mellow taste.) giving the leaves a slightly yellow coloring during the drying process. Chinese yellow tea is often placed in the same category as green tea because of its light oxidation. One of the goals of this production method is to remove the characteristic grassy smell of green tea.

=== Varieties ===
- Junshan Yinzhen (君山銀針): from Hunan Province, China is a Silver Needle yellow tea. A Chinese Famous Tea.
- Huoshan Huangya (霍山黃芽): from Mt. Huo, Anhui Province, China.
- Meng Ding Huangya (蒙頂黃芽): from Mt. Meng, Ya'an, Sichuan Province, China.
- Mogan Huangya (莫干黃芽): from Mount Mogan, Zhejiang Province, China.
- Beigang Maojian (北港毛尖): from Yueyang, Hunan Province, China. Also known by the Tang Dynasty-era name Yōnghúchá (邕湖茶).
- Weishan Maojian (溈山毛尖): from Mt. Wei, Weishan Township, Ningxiang, Hunan Province, China.
- Haimagong Cha (海馬宮茶): from Dafang County, Guizhou Province, China.
- Da Ye Qing (大葉青): from Guangdong Province, China. Literally Big Leaf Green.
- Pingyang Huangtang (平陽黃湯): from Zhejiang Province, China. Could be called one of the Wenzhou Huangtang (溫州黃湯); the latter term is literally translated as Yellow Broth or Yellow Soup.
- Yuan'an Luyuan (遠安鹿苑): from Yuan'an County, Hubei Province, China.

== Korean hwangcha ==
- Yellow tea
- Hangul: 황차
- Hanja: 黃茶
- RR: hwangcha
- MR: hwangch'a
- IPA: [hwaŋ.tɕʰa]

In Korean tea terminology, domestic tea is categorized mainly as either green (nokcha; 녹차) or fermented (balhyocha; 발효차), "fermented" here practically meaning "oxidized"; "yellow tea" (hwangcha) denotes lightly oxidized balhyocha without implications of processing methods or a result that would qualify the tea as "yellow" in the Chinese definition. Unlike Chinese huángchá, Korean hwangcha is made similarly to oolong tea or lightly oxidized black tea, depending on who makes it. The key feature is a noticeable but otherwise relatively low level of oxidation which leaves the resulting tea liquor yellow in color.

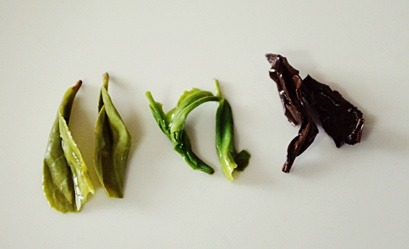
Tea leaves: sejak (green tea), ujeon (green tea), hwangcha (yellow tea)

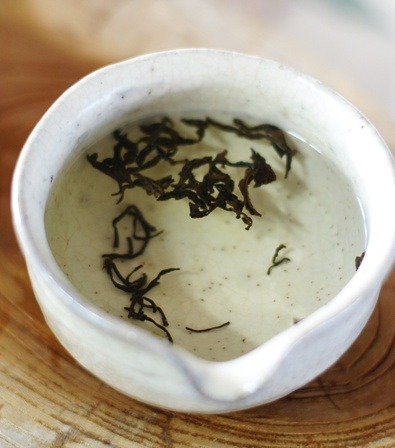
Hadong hwangcha

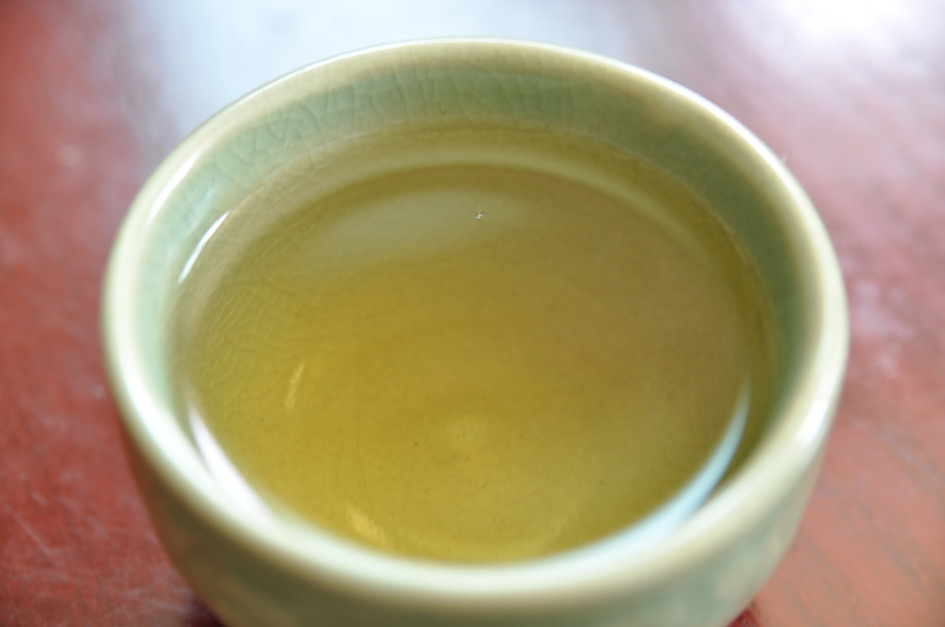
Hwangcha

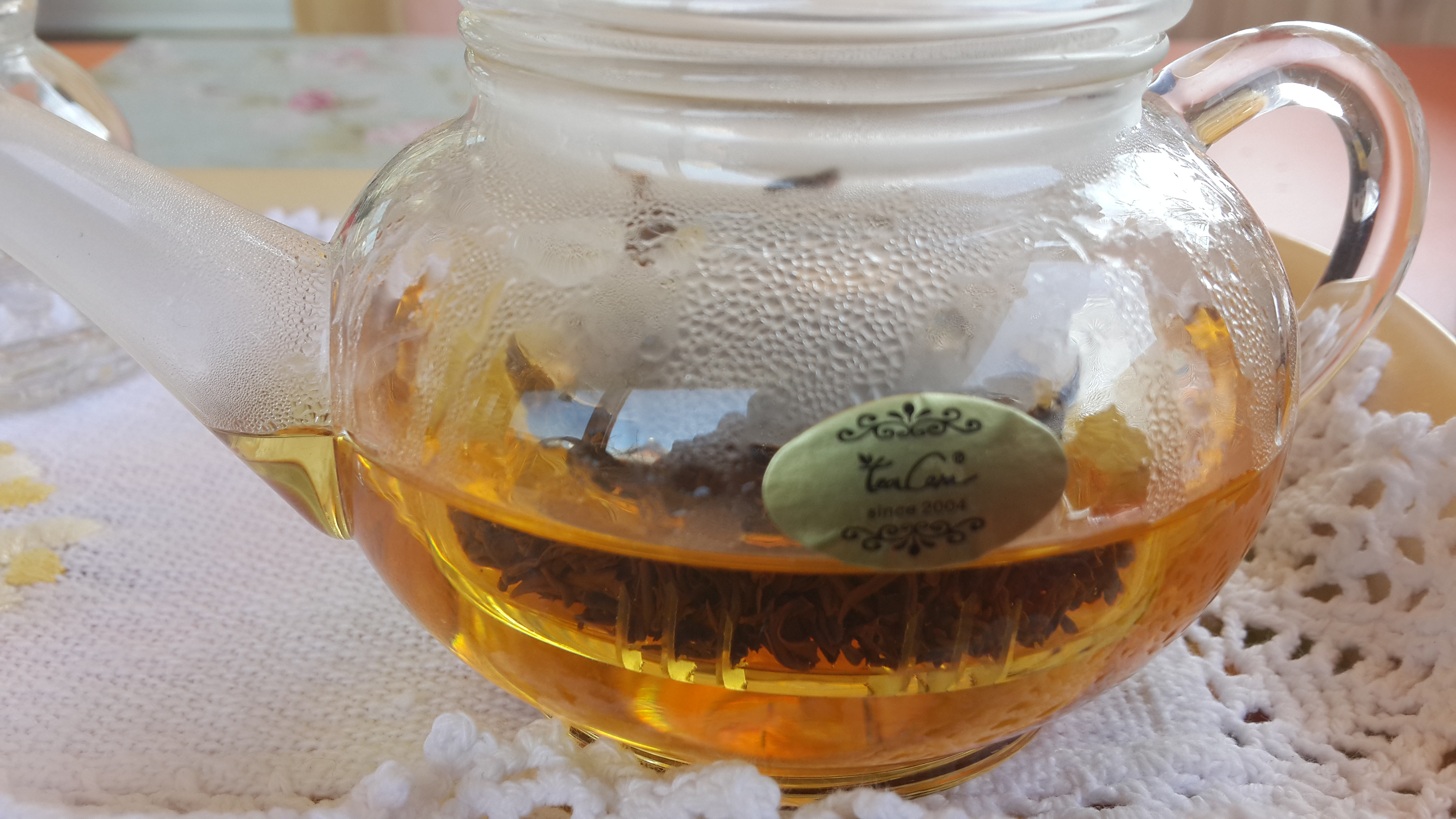
infusing hwangcha

== See also ==
- Black tea
- Oolong tea
- Dark tea
- Green tea
- White tea
