= Mengding Ganlu tea =

Chinese green tea

Mengding Ganlu
- Type: Green
- Other names: simplified Chinese: 蒙顶甘露; traditional Chinese: 蒙頂甘露; pinyin: Méngdǐng Gānlù; lit. 'Meng Peak Sweet Dew'; pronounced [mə̌ŋ.tìŋ kánlû]
- Origin: Sichuan Province, China
- Quick description: A yellowish-green tea with sweet aftertaste.

Mengding Ganlu or Ganlu tea is a tea from Meng Mountain (Meng Shan), Sichuan Province in the southwest part of China. Meng Shan is reputed to be the place where tea was first cultivated. Mengding Ganlu means "Sweet Dew of Mengding" where Mengding refers to "the top of Meng Shan".

== History ==
According to legend, a Taoist Master Wu Lizhen (吴理真) first planted seven tea bushes on Meng Mountain during the Ganlu era (53-50 BCE) of Emperor Xuan of Han dynasty. Prior to this, tea were picked from wild tea bushes. After he died, the tea was called "tea of the immortals" (仙茶). Buddhist monasteries were later established on the five peaks of the mountain, and from the Tang dynasty to the Qing dynasty, 360 tea leaves were picked and prepared each spring by the Buddhist monks to be presented to the emperor. The tea was used as ceremonial offering by the emperor. Wu Lizhen was conferred the posthumous honorific title of Master of Ganlu (meaning "Sweet Dew", full title Ganlu Puhui Miaoji Dashi 甘露普惠妙济大师) by Emperor Xiaozong of the Song dynasty, from which the tea acquired its name.

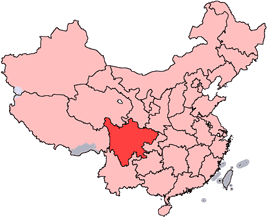
Mengding Ganlu tea is grown in Sichuan province, China.

Before the mid-Tang dynasty, tea from the Meng Mountain was rare and highly prized; and as demand grew, more tea bushes were planted. Mengding Ganlu is one of the teas produced in the Meng Mountain and it is a green tea, other teas from Meng Mountain include "Mengding Huangya" (蒙顶黄芽) and "Mengding Shihua" (蒙顶石花) which are yellow teas. According to the 16th century scholar Li Shizhen who compiled Compendium of Materia Medica, tea produced from Meng Mountain is "warm and able to take charge of disease," unlike other kinds of tea which are generally cool in nature.
