= Baicha =

Baicha or bai cha may refer to:

- White tea, several styles of tea using young or minimally-processed tea leaves
- Anji bai cha, green tea variety produced in Anji, Zhejiang, China
- Baicha, Jiangxi, town in Yongxiu County, Jiujiang, Jiangxi, China
- Bai cha, a Khmer variation of fried rice
