= Anji dialect =

Wu Chinese dialect of Zhejiang, China

- 安吉說話/安吉说话
- Native to: People's Republic of China
- Region: Anji, Zhejiang, China
- Language family: Sino-Tibetan: Sinitic; Chinese; Wu; Taihu; Tiao-xi; Anji dialect

Language codes
- ISO 639-3: –

The Anji dialect is a dialect of the Wu spoken in the county of Anji in Zhejiang province, China. Anji dialect is the local language spoken by the indigenous people of Anji and is the common language of communication in the county.

== Grammar ==
=== Pronouns ===
	1st person	2nd person	3rd person
Singular	我/ŋoʔ^{2}/	你/nəʔ^{2}/	渠/ʥi^{2}/
plural	伢/ŋaʔ^{2}/	倷/naʔ^{2}/	伽/ʥia^{2}/
