= Huoshan Huangya tea =

Yellow tea from Anhui Province, China

Huoshan Huangya
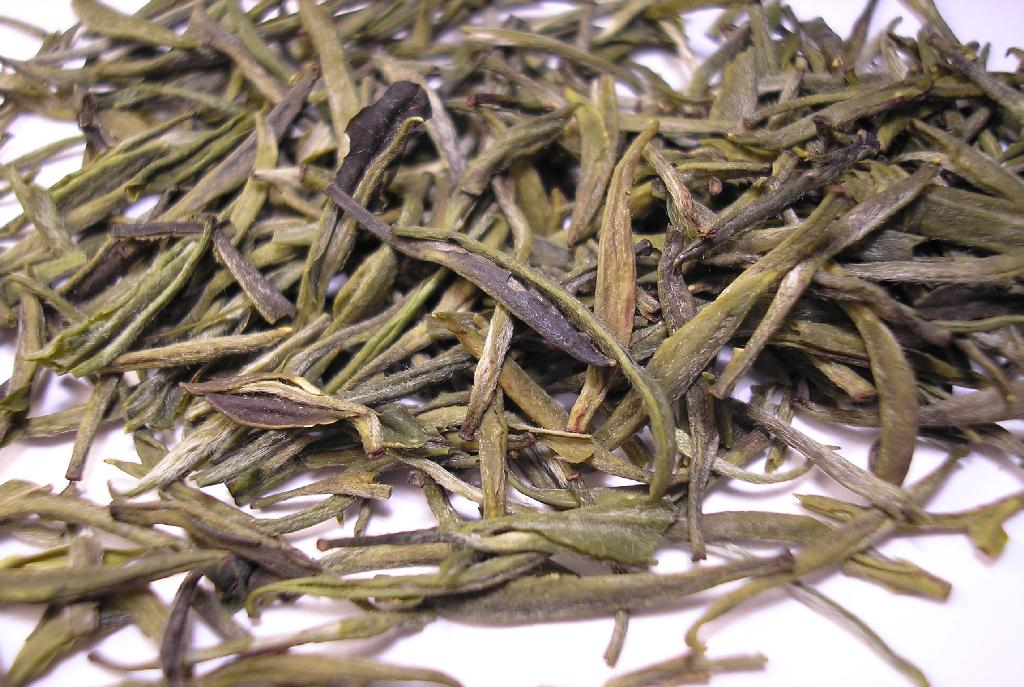
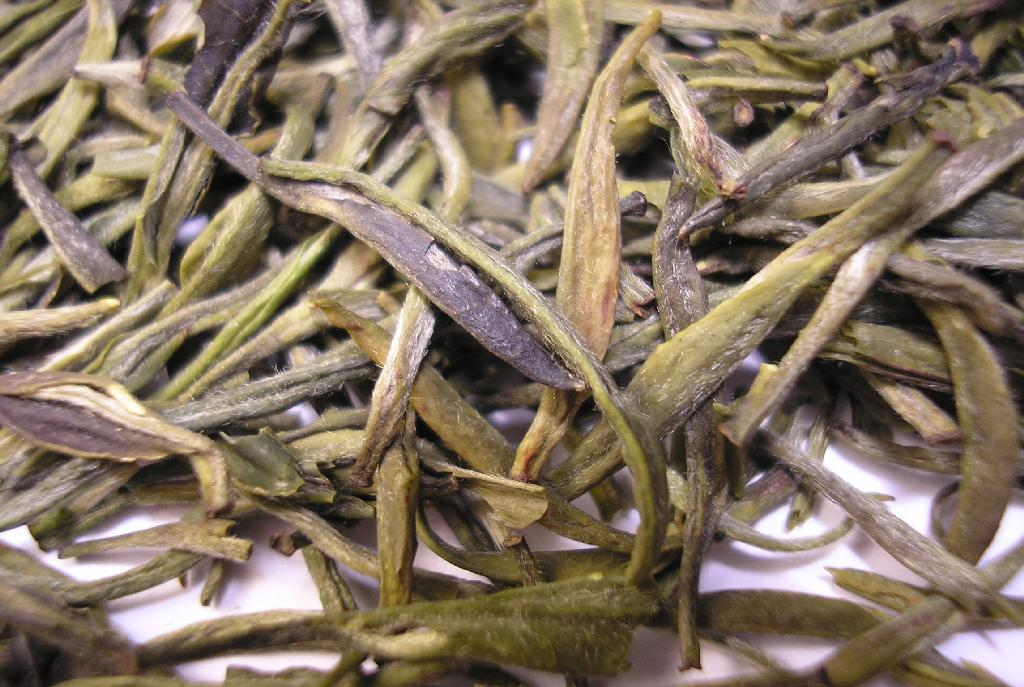
- Type: Yellow
- Other names: Huo Mountain Yellow Sprout
- Origin: Anhui Province, China
- Quick description: Refreshing bamboo-like fragrance.

Huoshan Huangya tea is grown in Anhui province, China.

Huoshan Huangya tea (simplified Chinese: 霍山黄芽; traditional Chinese: 霍山黃芽; pinyin: huòshān huángyá; pronounced [xwô.ʂán xwǎŋ.jǎ]) is a yellow tea from Huoshan County of Anhui Province in China. It is an imperial tribute tea, that dates back to the Ming Dynasty. The dry tea leaves have a shiny appearance and are very similar to Huang Shan Mao Feng tea. This tea is usually harvested in early April, and only includes cuttings with one bud and one leaf, or one bud with two unopened leaves. When steeped, the tea has a very sweet and nutty taste as well as an unusual green-yellow color. As with most bud teas, the color and fragrance are slight.
