= Shangshu Township =

Shangshu Township 上墅乡
- Township
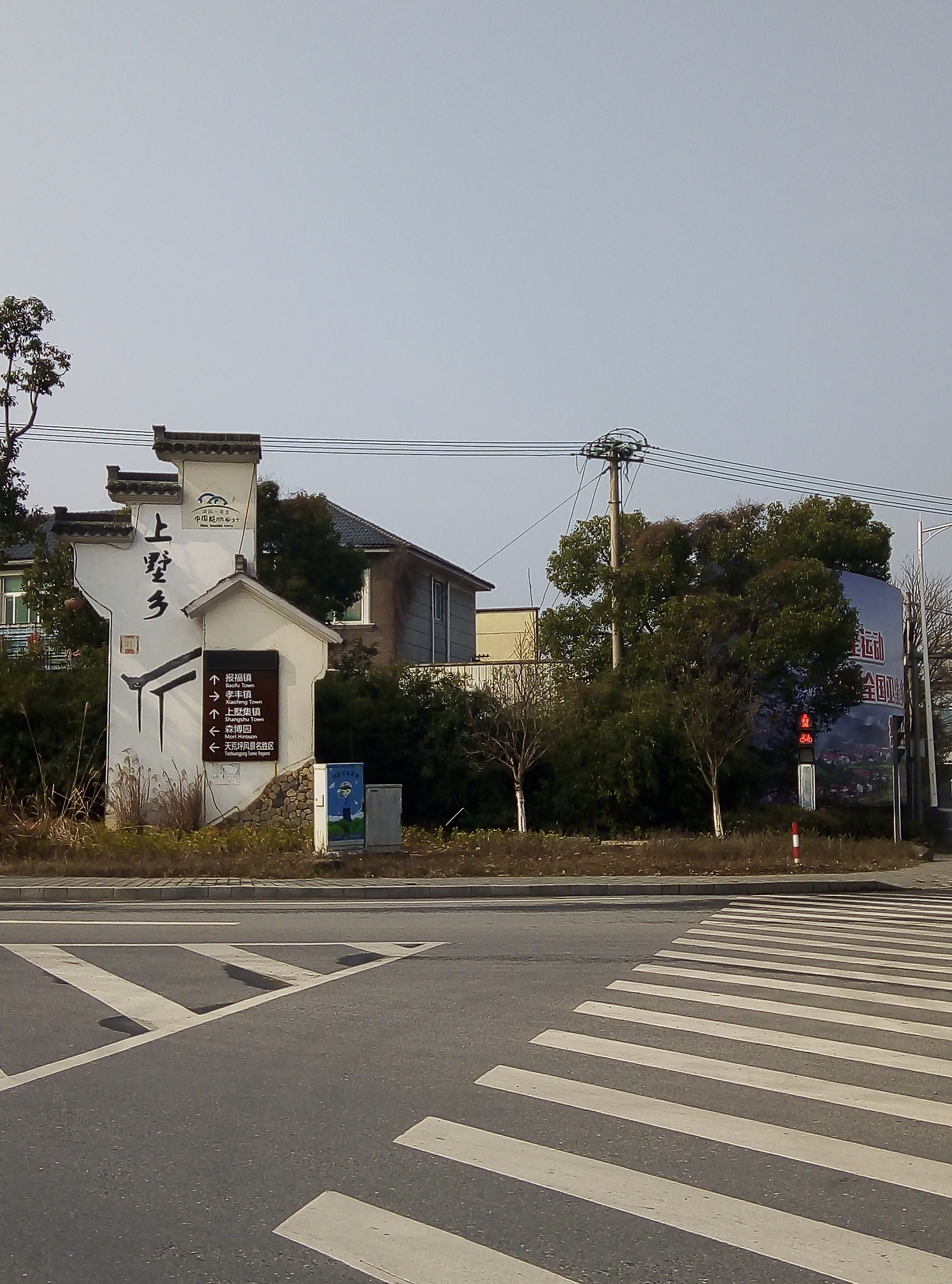
- Shangshu Town.jpg

- Location in Zhejiang
- Coordinates: 30°32′58″N 119°34′11″E
- Country: People's Republic of China
- Province: Zhejiang
- Prefecture-level city: Huzhou
- County: Anji County
- Time zone: UTC+8 (China Standard)

Shangshu Township (simplified Chinese: 上墅乡; traditional Chinese: 上墅鄉; pinyin: Shàngshù Xiāng) is a township under the administration of Anji County, Zhejiang, China. As of 2020, it has seven villages under its administration:

- Shangshu Village
- Dongling Village (董岭村)
- Liujiatang Village (刘家塘村)
- Luo Village (罗村)
- Tiangai Village (田垓村)
- Longwang Village (龙王村)
- Shiruan Village (施阮村)
