= Green tea =

Unoxidized tea

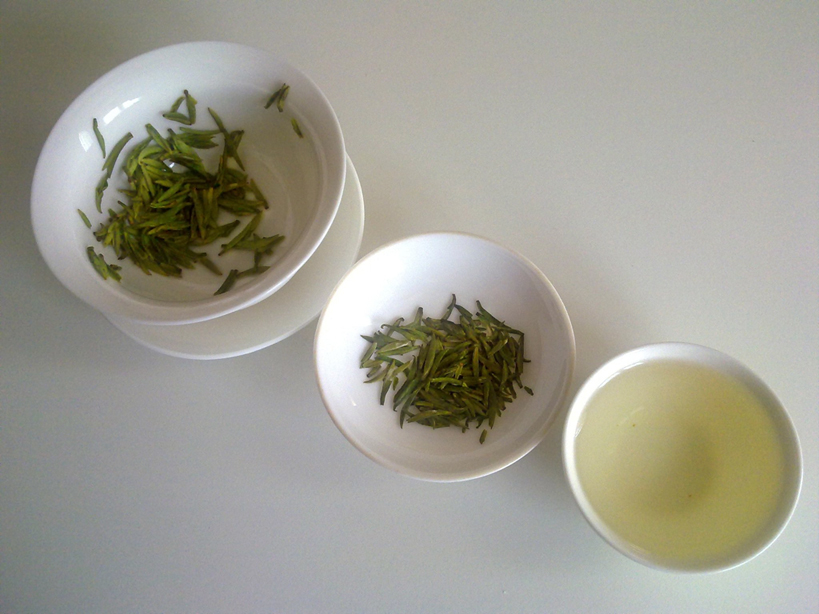
- The appearance of green tea in three different stages (from left to right): the infused leaves, the dry leaves, and the liquid.
- Type: Tea
- Origin: China, East Asia
- Colour: Green
- Ingredients: Tea leaves
- Related products: Tea

Green tea

Chinese name
- Traditional Chinese: 綠茶
- Simplified Chinese: 绿茶
- Literal meaning: Green tea
Transcriptions
Standard Mandarin
- Hanyu Pinyin: lǜchá
- Bopomofo: ㄌㄩˋ ㄔㄚˊ
- Wade–Giles: lü^{4}-ch'a^{2}
- IPA: [lŷ.ʈʂʰǎ]
Yue: Cantonese
- Yale Romanization: luhk-chàh
- Jyutping: luk6-caa4
- IPA: [lʊk̚˨.tsʰa˩]
Southern Min
- Tâi-lô: li̍k-tê

Japanese name
- Kanji: 緑茶
- Hiragana: りょくちゃ
Transcriptions
- Revised Hepburn: Ryoku-cha
- Kunrei-shiki: Ryoku-tya

Green tea is a type of tea made from the leaves and buds of the Camellia sinensis that have not undergone the withering and oxidation process that creates oolong teas and black teas. Green tea originated in China in the late 1st millennium BC, and since then its production and manufacture has spread to other countries in East Asia.

Several varieties of green tea exist, which differ substantially based on the variety of C. sinensis used, growing conditions, horticultural methods, production processing, and time of harvest. While it may slightly lower blood pressure and improve alertness, consuming green tea does not provide health effects. Excessive intake of green tea extracts can cause liver damage, interfere with prescription drugs, and produce gastrointestinal discomfort.

== History ==
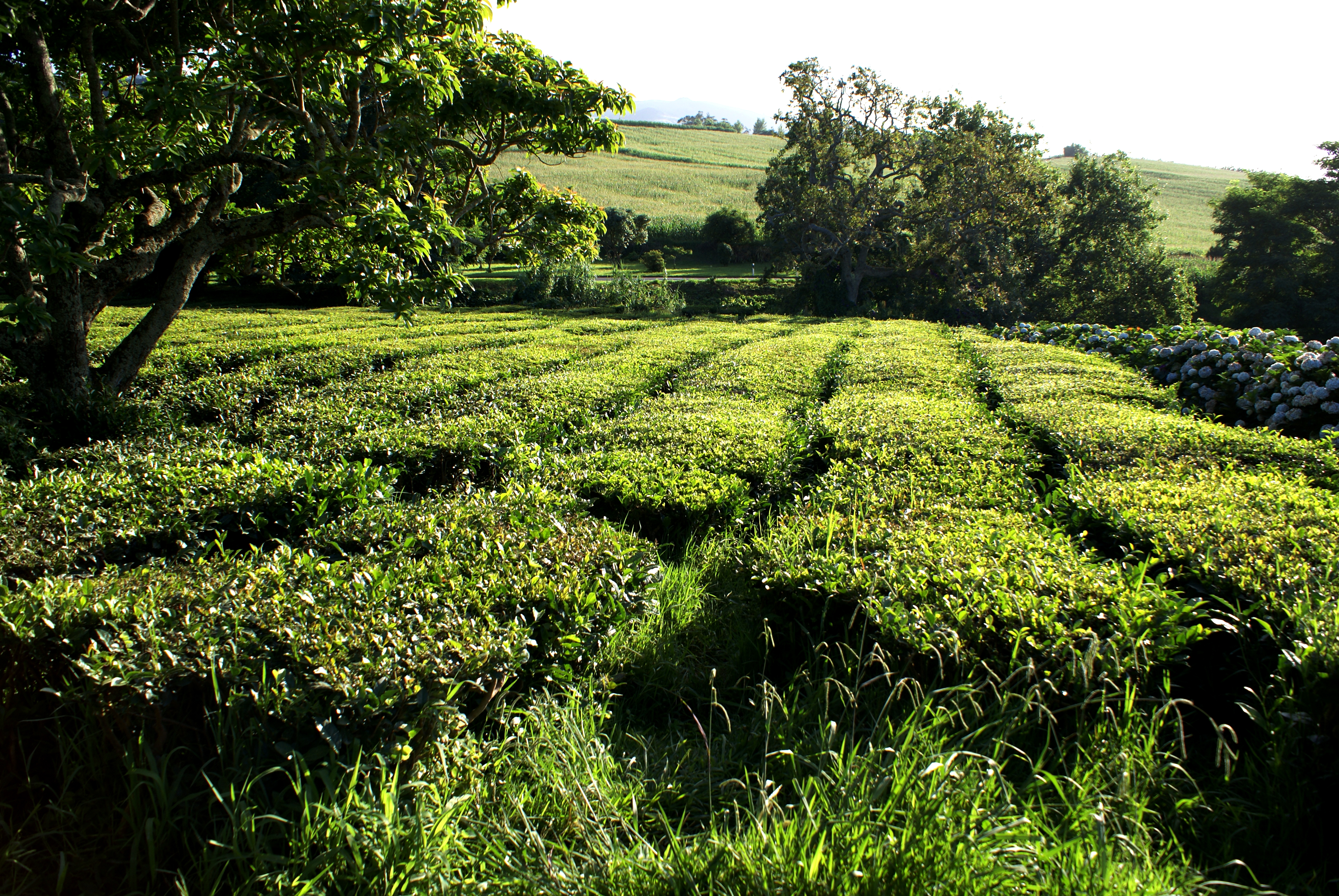
The tea fields in the foothills of Gorreana, Azores Islands, Portugal: the only European region other than Georgia to support green tea production.

Tea consumption has its legendary origins in China during the reign of mythological Emperor Shennong.

A book written by Lu Yu in 618–907 AD, The Classic of Tea (Chinese: 茶經; pinyin: chájīng), is considered important in green tea history. Another early text, the Book of Tea (Kissa Yōjōki, lit. Record [of] Drinking Tea [for] Nourishing Life), written by Zen priest Eisai in 1211, discusses tea drinking in relation to health and the five viscera.

== Steeping, brewing and serving ==
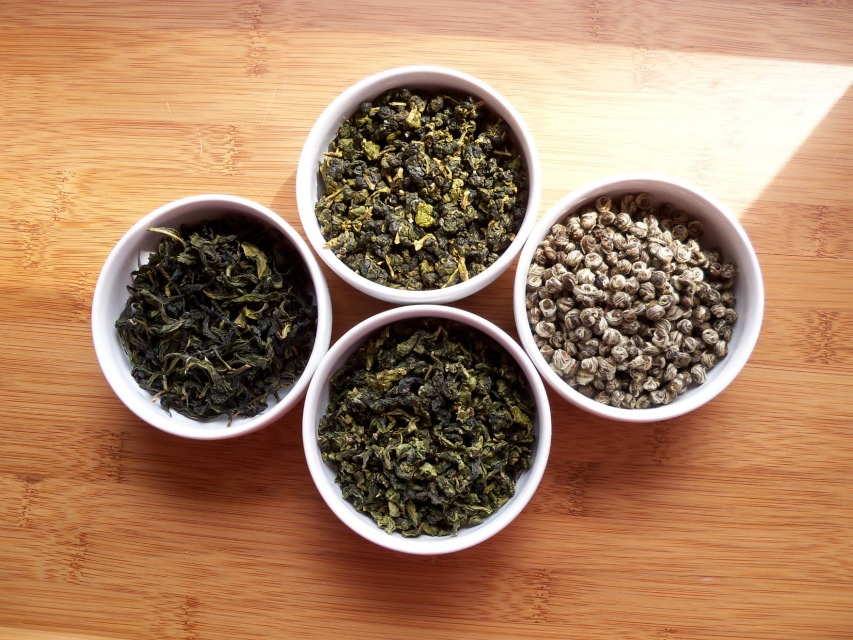
Four varieties of green tea prior to brewing

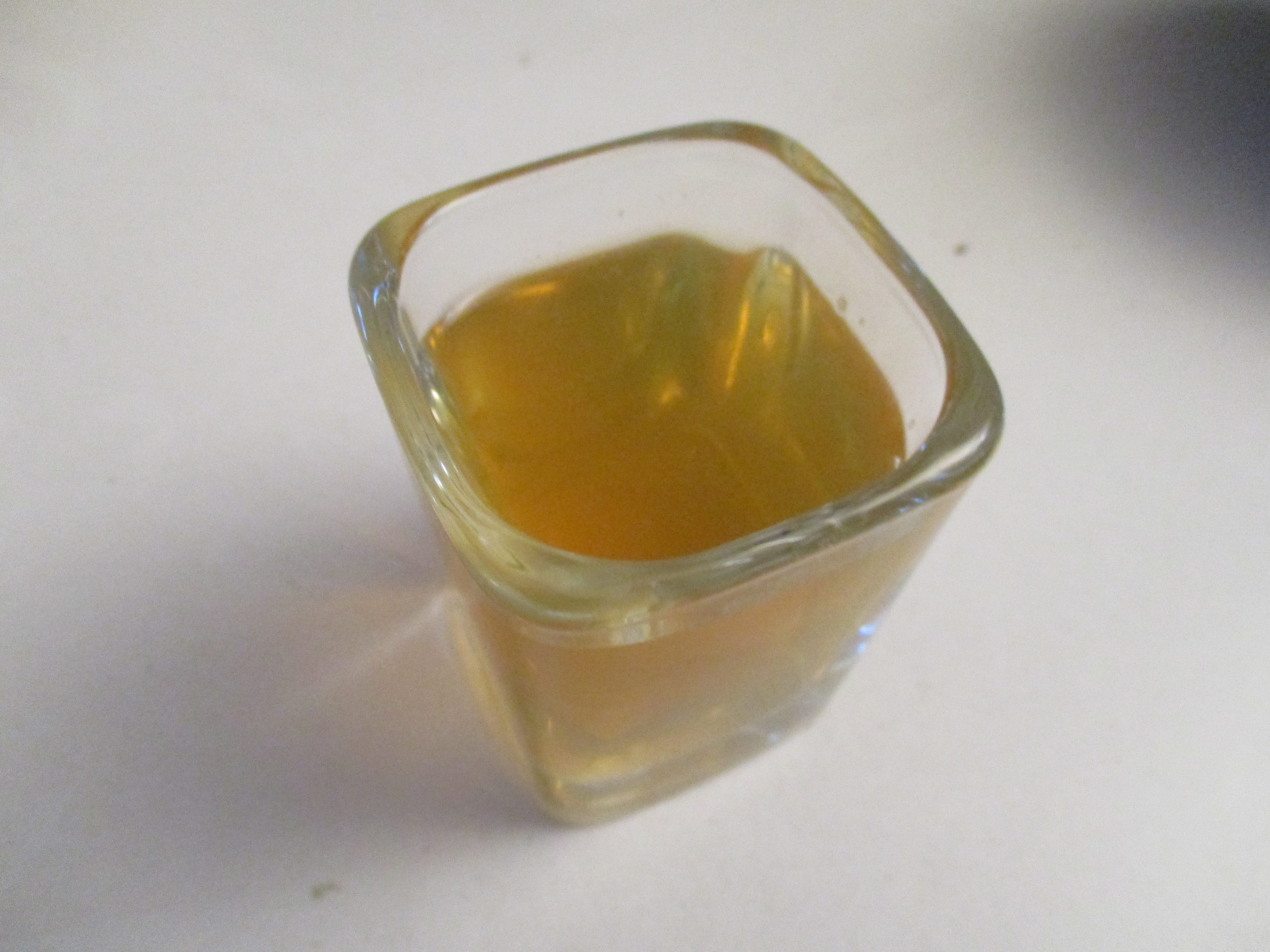
The colour of green tea brewed for 3 minutes at 90 °C (194 °F)

Steeping, or brewing, is the process of making tea from leaves and hot water, generally using 2 grams (0.07 oz) of tea per 100 mL (3.5 imp fl oz; 3.4 US fl oz) of water or about 1 tsp (5 mL) of green tea per 150 mL (5.3 imp fl oz; 5.1 US fl oz) cup. Steeping temperatures range from 61 °C (142 °F) to 87 °C (189 °F) and steeping times from 30 seconds to three minutes.

Generally, lower-quality green teas are steeped hotter and longer while higher-quality teas are steeped cooler and shorter, but usually multiple times (2–3 typically). Higher-quality teas like gyokuro use more tea leaves and are steeped multiple times for short durations. Steeping too hot or too long results in the release of excessive amounts of tannins, leading to a bitter, astringent brew, regardless of initial quality. The brew's taste is also affected by the steeping technique; two important techniques are to warm the steeping container beforehand to prevent the tea from immediately cooling down, and to leave the tea leaves in the pot and gradually add more hot water during consumption.

== Production ==
In 2013, global production of green tea was approximately 1.7 million tonnes, with a forecast to double in volume by 2023. As of 2015, China provided 80% of the world's green tea market, leading to its green tea exports rising by 9% annually, while exporting 325,000 tonnes in 2015. In 2015, the US was the largest importer of Chinese green tea (6,800 tonnes), an increase of 10% over 2014, and Britain imported 1,900 tonnes, 15% more than in 2014.

=== Growing, harvesting and processing ===
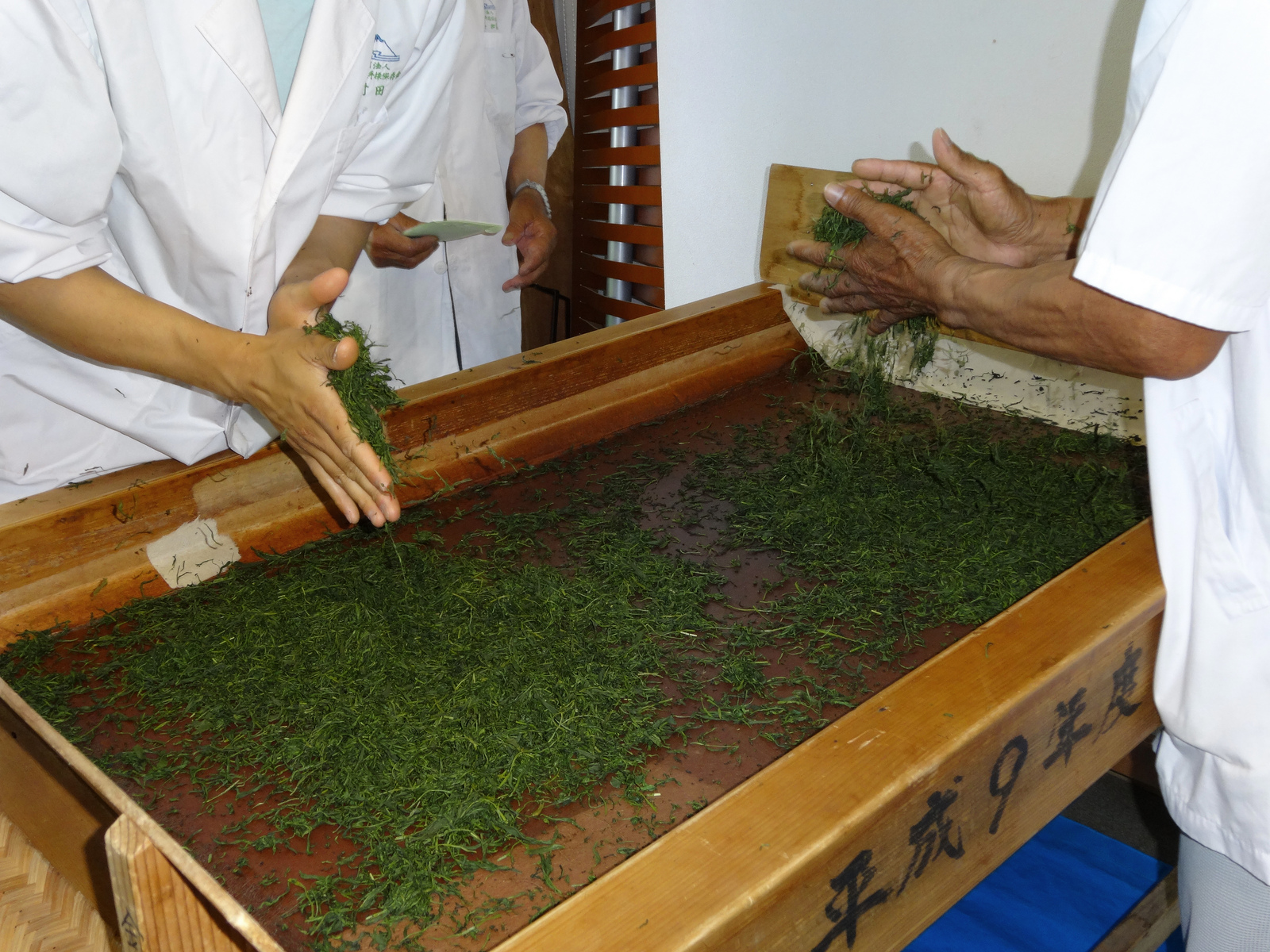
Hand-rolling green tea after steaming

Green tea is processed and grown in a variety of ways, depending on the type of green tea desired. As a result of these methods, maximum amounts of polyphenols and volatile organic compounds are retained, affecting aroma and taste. The growing conditions can be broken down into two basic types − those grown in the sun and those grown under the shade. The green tea plants are grown in rows that are pruned to produce shoots in a regular manner, and in general are harvested three times per year. The first flush takes place in late April to early May. The second harvest usually takes place from June through July, and the third picking takes place in late July to early August. Sometimes, there will also be a fourth harvest. The first flush in the spring brings the best-quality leaves, with higher prices to match.

Green tea is processed after picking using either artisanal or modern methods. Sun-drying, basket or charcoal firing, or pan-firing are common artisanal methods. Oven-drying, tumbling, or steaming are common modern methods. Processed green teas, known as aracha, are stored under low humidity refrigeration in 30- or 60-kilogram paper bags at 0–5 °C (32–41 °F). This aracha has yet to be refined at this stage, with a final firing taking place before blending, selection and packaging take place. The leaves in this state will be re-fired throughout the year as they are needed, giving the green teas a longer shelf-life and better flavour. The first flush tea of May will readily store in this fashion until the next year's harvest. After this re-drying process, each crude tea will be sifted and graded according to size. Finally, each lot will be blended according to the blending order by the tasters and packed for sale.

== Green tea across East Asia ==
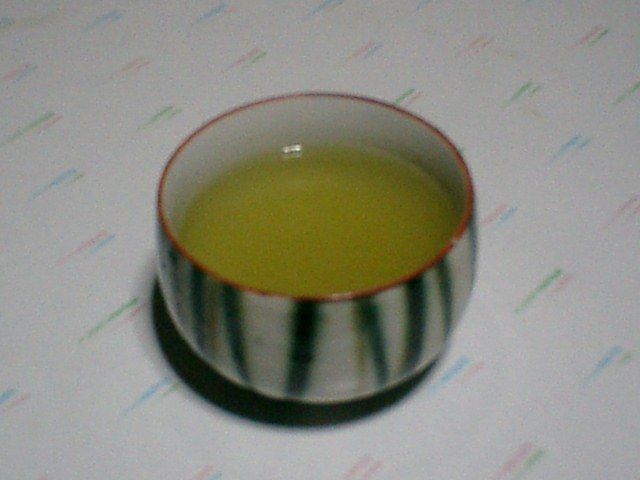
A little cup of green tea

=== Mainland China and Taiwan ===
Chinese name
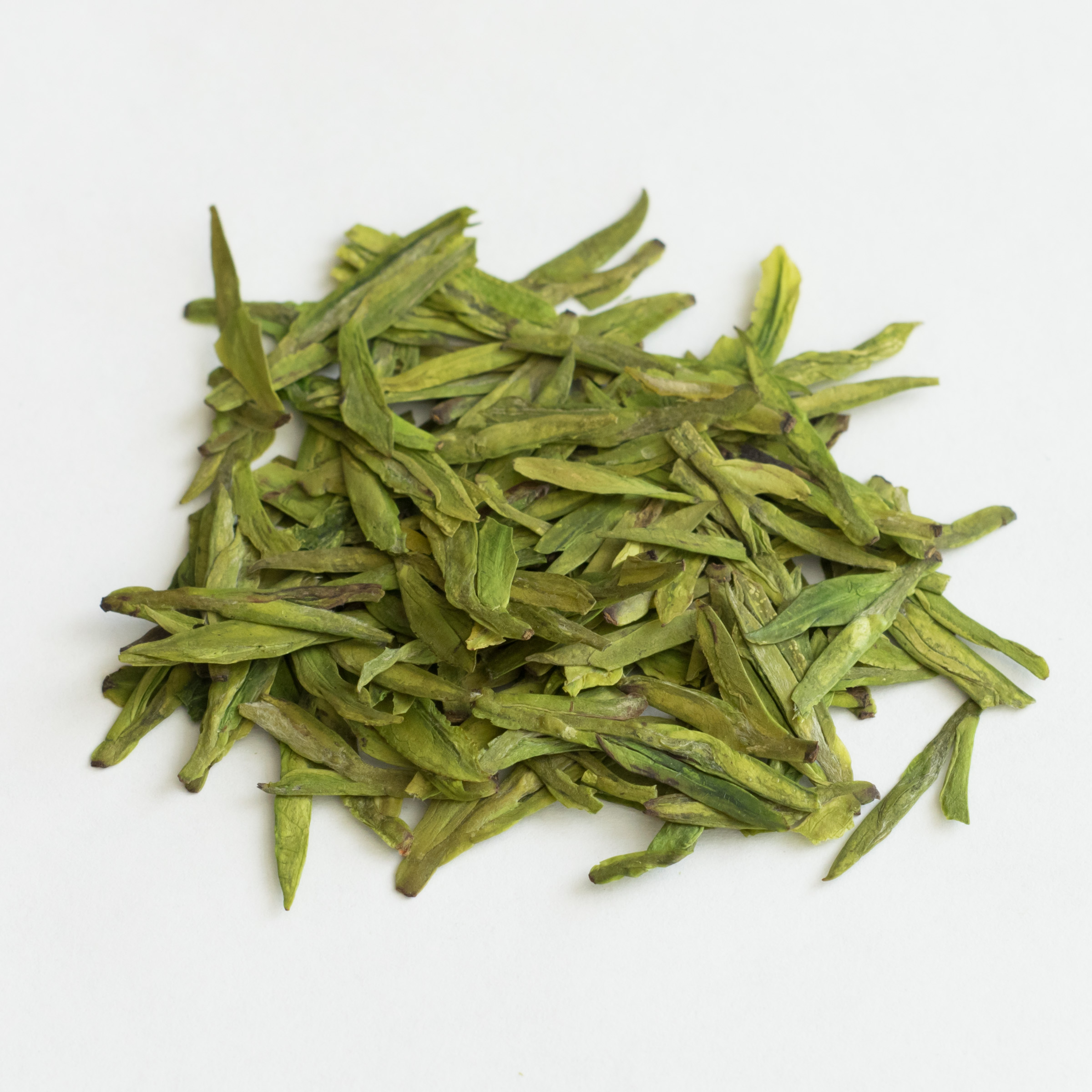
- Longjing, a green tea from Zhejiang, China
- Traditional Chinese: 綠茶
- Simplified Chinese: 绿茶
- Hanyu Pinyin: lǜchá
Transcriptions
Standard Mandarin
- Hanyu Pinyin: lǜchá
- Wade–Giles: lü4-ch'a2
- IPA: [lŷ.ʈʂʰǎ]
Yue: Cantonese
- Jyutping: luk6 caa4
Southern Min
- Hokkien POJ: le̍k-tê

Loose leaf green tea has been the most popular form of tea in China since at least the Southern Song dynasty. While Chinese green tea was originally steamed, as it still is in Japan, after the early Ming dynasty it has typically been processed by being pan-fired in a dry wok. Other processes employed in China today include oven-firing, basket-firing, tumble-drying and sun-drying. Green tea is the most widely produced form of tea in China, with 1.42 million tons grown in 2014.

Popular green teas produced in China today include:

- Green snail spring (碧螺春; Bì luó chūn)
  Produced in Jiangsu, this tea is named after the shape of the leaves, which are curled like snails.
- Precious eyebrows (珍眉; zhēn méi)
  Known in English by its Cantonese name, and popular outside China. It has a plum-like flavour.
- Gunpowder tea (珠茶; zhū chá)
  "Pearl tea", also called Gunpowder tea, is a form of tea which is tumble-dried so that each leaf is rolled into a small pellet that resembles gunpowder.
- Yellow Mountain fur peak (黄山毛峰; huángshān máofēng)
  A type of maofeng tea grown in the microclimate of the Huangshan mountain range in Anhui province. Maofeng teas are harvested by plucking intact two equal-sized leaves and a bud together.
- Dragon Well (龍井茶; lóngjǐng)
  Grown near Hangzhou in Zhejiang province, Longjing is the most well-known pan-fired Chinese green tea. Its flavour derives partly from the terroir of the region in which it is produced.
- Lu'an melon seed (六安瓜片; Lù'ān guāpiàn)
  Grown in Anhui province. Unlike typical Chinese teas, two leaves are plucked separately from each branch, with no bud and no stems. Harvested later in the season, it has a grassier flavour than typical Chinese green teas.
- Peaceful monkey leader (太平猴魁; tàipíng hóukuí)
  Grown in Anhui province. Uses a cultivar with an unusually large leaf. The production process flattens the tea leaves, creating the so-called "two knives and a pole" shape from the leaves and stem.
- Tippy green (信陽毛尖; Xìnyáng Máojiān)
  A type of maojian tea grown in Xinyang, Henan province. Maojian teas are harvested by plucking a bud and one leaf together.
- Anji white (安吉白; Ānjí bái)
  A type of green tea from Anji
- Sweet dew of Mengding (蒙頂甘露; Méngdǐng Gānlù)
  A yellowish-green tea with sweet aftertaste from Mending mountain in Sichuan
- Duyun Maojian (都匀毛尖)
  One of the famous Chinese teas which was a favourite of Mao Zedong.
- Cloud tea (雲雾茶; yún wù chá)
  A type of green tea originally cultivated in Le Mountain (南岳山; nányuè shān), named for the mountain clouds. It is mentioned in The Classic of Tea and is one of the famous Chinese teas.

=== Japan ===
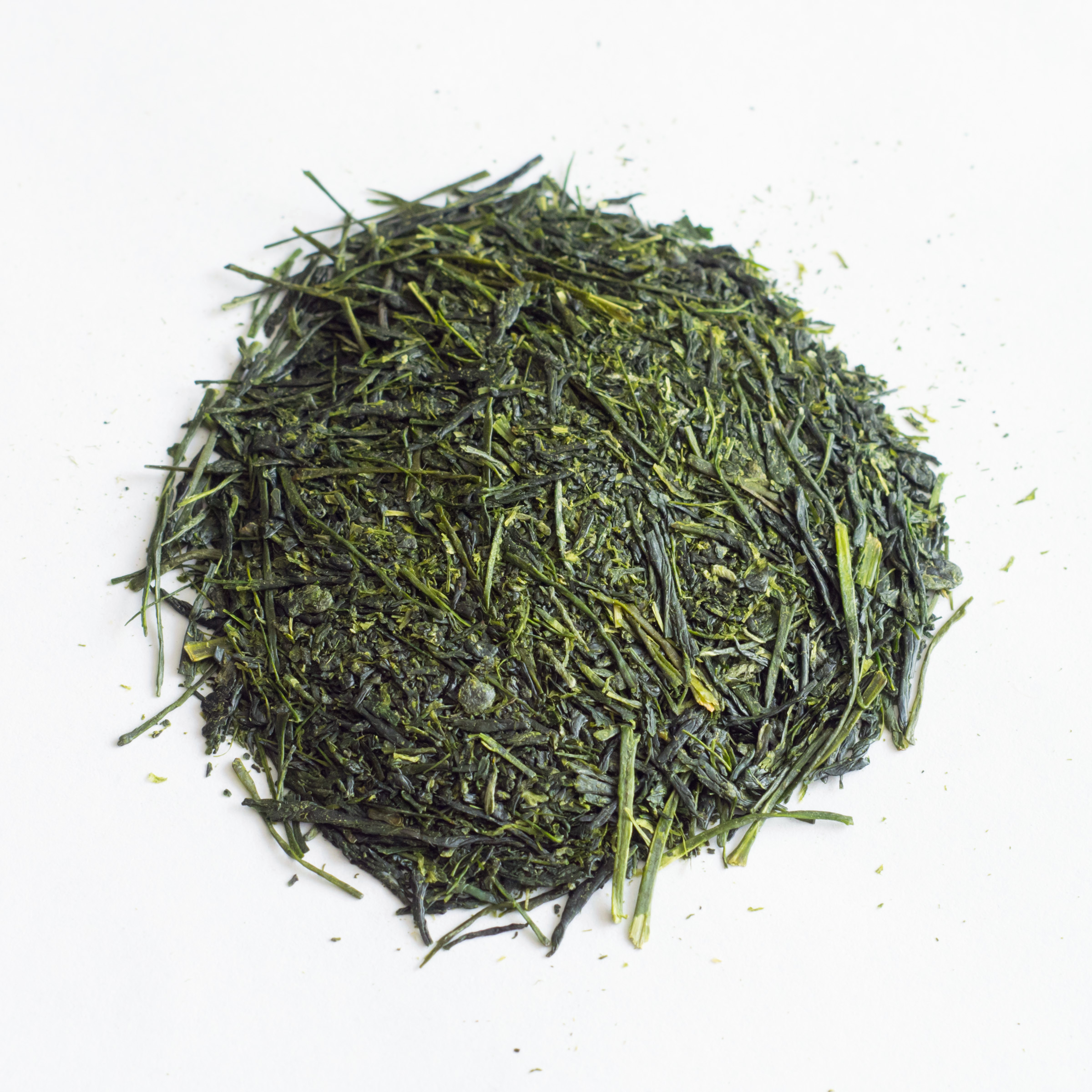
Sencha green tea, the most popular form of tea in Japan

Tea seeds were first brought to Japan in the early 9th century by the Buddhist monks Saicho and Kūkai. During the Heian period (794–1185), Emperor Saga introduced the practice of drinking tea to the imperial family. The Zen Buddhist priest Eisai (1141–1215), founder of the Rinzai school of Buddhism, brought tea seeds from China to plant in various places in Japan. Eisai advocated that all people, not just Buddhist monks and the elite, drink tea for its health benefits.

The oldest tea-producing region in Japan is Uji, located near the former capital of Kyoto. It is thought that seeds sent by Eisai were planted in Uji, becoming the basis of the tea industry there. Today, Japan's most expensive premium teas are still grown in Uji. The largest tea-producing area today is Shizuoka Prefecture, which accounts for 40% of total Japanese sencha production. Other major tea-producing regions include the island of Kyushu and the prefectures of Shiga, Gifu, and Saitama in central Honshu.

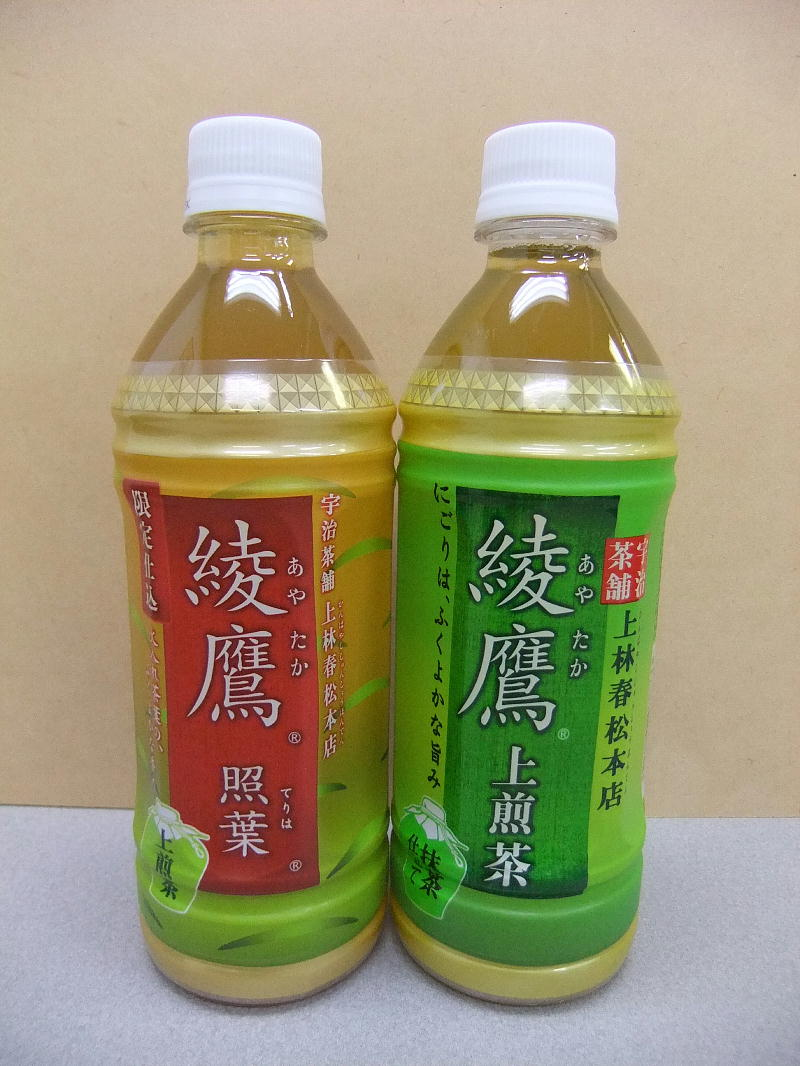
A sample of bottled unsweetened iced green tea produced by The Coca-Cola Company that is primarily sold in Japan under the brand name Ayataka.

All commercial tea produced in Japan today is green tea, though for a brief period black tea was also produced in the late 19th and early 20th centuries. Japanese tea production is heavily mechanized, and is characterized by the use of modern technology and processes to improve yields and reduce labour. Because of the high cost of labour in Japan, only the highest quality teas are plucked and processed by hand in the traditional fashion.

Japanese green teas have a thin, needle-like shape and a rich, dark green colour. Unlike Chinese teas, most Japanese teas are produced by steaming rather than pan-firing. This produces their characteristic colour, and creates a sweeter, more grassy flavour. A mechanical rolling/drying process then dries the tea leaves into their final shape. The liquor of steamed Japanese tea tends to be cloudy due to the higher quantity of dissolved solids.

Most Japanese teas are blended from leaves grown in different regions, with less emphasis on terroir than in the Chinese market. Because of the limited quantity of tea that can be produced in Japan, the majority of production is dedicated to the premium tea market. Cheaper bottled teas and tea-flavoured food products usually use lower-grade Japanese-style tea produced in China.

Although a variety of commercial tea cultivars exist in Japan, the vast majority of Japanese tea is produced using the Yabukita cultivar developed in the 1950s.

Popular Japanese green teas include:

- Bancha (番茶)
  A lower-grade tea plucked from the same bushes used to produce sencha. It has a somewhat bolder flavour, and is plucked each season after sencha production is finished.
- Genmaicha (玄米茶)
  Made by combining sencha tea leaves with toasted puffs of rice.
- Gyokuro (玉露)
  Grown under shade for three weeks prior to plucking, gyokuro is one of the most exclusive varieties of tea produced in Japan. The shading technique imparts a sweeter flavour, and produces a particularly rich colour thanks to the higher amounts of chlorophyll in the shaded leaf. Gyokuro tea is associated with the Uji region, the first tea-growing region in Japan. It is often made using smaller-leaf cultivars of the tea plant.
- Hōjicha (焙じ茶)
  This type of tea is made by roasting sencha or bancha leaves with kukicha twigs.
- Kabusecha (かぶせ茶)
  Similar to gyokuro, kabusecha is shaded for only a week prior to plucking. Its flavour is somewhat between that of gyokuro and normal sencha.
- Kukicha (茎茶)
  A blended tea made of sencha leaves and stems.
- Matcha (抹茶)
  Like gyokuro, matcha is shaded before plucking. The plucked and processed leaf is called tencha. This product is then ground into a fine powder, which is matcha. Because the tea powder is very perishable, matcha is usually sold in small quantities. It is typically rather expensive. Matcha is the type of tea used in the Japanese tea ceremony. It is prepared by whisking the tea with hot water in a bowl, until the surface is frothy. If the water is too hot, the tea may become overly bitter.
- Sencha (煎茶)
  This type of tea is produced throughout the tea season, and is the standard style today, representing 80% of all tea produced in Japan. 90% of sencha is grown from the Yabukita cultivar.
- Shincha (新茶)
  The first early harvest of tea, plucked before the first flush, is called shincha. Shincha is made from the youngest new growth leaves, and is plucked from early April to early May. Shincha typically refers to the early harvest of sencha, but can refer to any type of tea plucked early in the season, before the main harvest. Because of the limited quantities in which it is produced, shincha is highly prized and expensive to obtain.

=== Korea ===
- Green tea
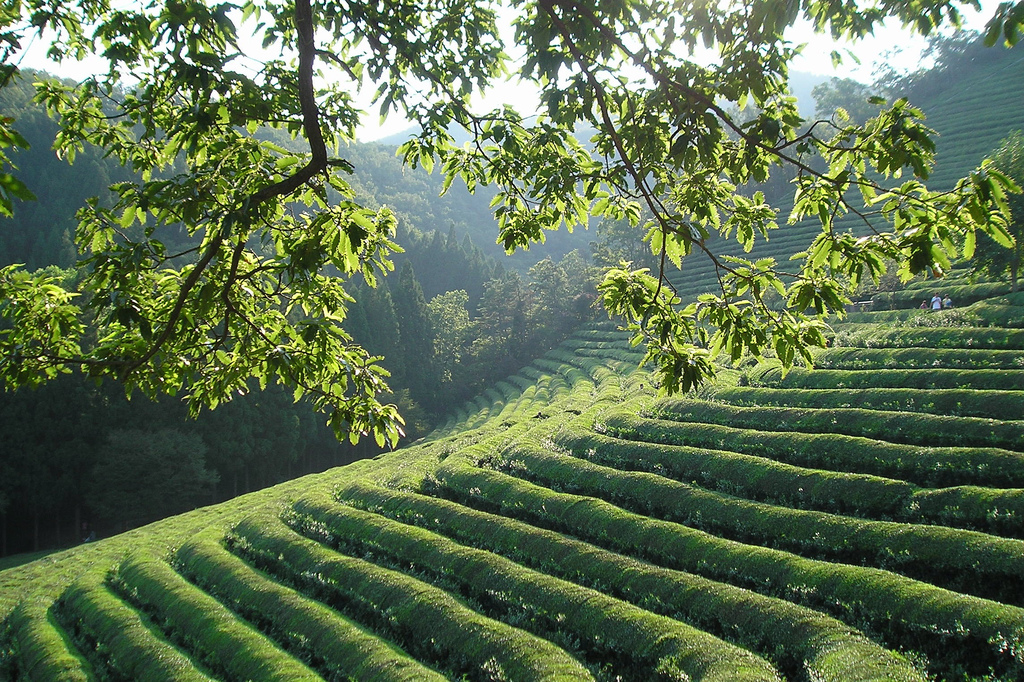
- Tea field in Boseong, South Korea

Korean name
- Hangul: 녹차
- Hanja: 綠茶
- RR: nokcha
- MR: nokch'a
- IPA: [nok̚.tɕʰa]

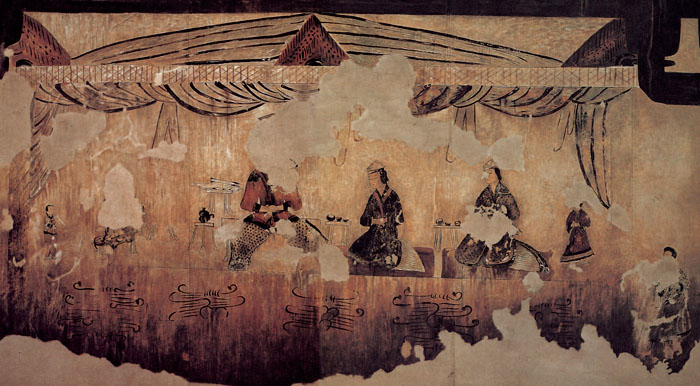
Gakjeochong, a Goguryeo tomb, shows a knight drinking tea with two ladies (5–6th century).

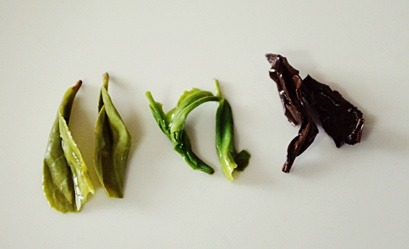
Tea leaves: sejak (green tea), ujeon (green tea), and hwangcha (yellow tea) from Hadong County

According to Record of Gaya cited in Memorabilia of the Three Kingdoms, the legendary queen Heo Hwang-ok, a princess of the Ayodhya married to King Suro of Gaya, brought the tea plant from India and planted it in Baegwolsan, a mountain in current Changwon. However, it is a widely held view that systematic planting of tea bushes began with the introduction of Chinese tea culture by the Buddhist monks around the 4th century. Amongst some of the earliest Buddhist temples in Korea, Bulgapsa (founded in 384, in Yeonggwang), Bulhoesa (founded in 384, in Naju) and Hwaeomsa (founded in Gurye, in 544) claim to be the birthplace of Korean tea culture. Green tea was commonly offered to Buddha, as well as to the spirits of deceased ancestors. Tea culture continued to prosper during the Goryeo period, with the tea offering being a part of the biggest national ceremonies and tea towns were formed around temples. Seon-Buddhist manners of ceremony prevailed. During the Joseon period, however, Korean tea culture underwent secularization, along with the Korean culture itself. Korean ancestral rite jesa, also referred to as charye (차례; 茶禮, "tea rite"), has its origin in darye (다례; 茶禮, "tea rite"), the practice of offering tea as simple ancestral rites by the royal family and the aristocracy in Joseon.

Tea culture of Korea was actively suppressed by the Japanese during the Japanese forced occupation period (1910‒1945), and the subsequent Korean War (1950‒1953) made it even harder for the Korean tea tradition to survive. The restoration of the Korean way of tea began in the 1970s, around Dasolsa. Commercial production of green tea in South Korea only began in the 1970s,. By 2012 the industry was producing 20% as much tea as Taiwan and 3.5% as much as Japan. Green tea is not as popular as coffee or other types of Korean teas in modern South Korea. The annual consumption per capita of green tea in South Korea in 2016 was 0.16 kg (5 1/2 oz), compared to 3.9 kg (8 lb 10 oz) coffee. Recently however, as the coffee market reached saturation point, South Korean tea production doubled during 2010‒2014, as did tea imports during 2009–2015, despite very high tariff rate (513.6% for green tea, compared to 40% for black tea, 8% for processed/roasted coffee, and 2% for raw coffee beans).

Korean green tea can be classified into various types based on several different factors. The most common is the flush, or the time of the year when the leaves are plucked (and thus also by leaf size).

- Ujeon
  Ujeon (우전; 雨前; lit. '"pre-rain"'), or cheonmul-cha (첫물차; lit. '"first flush tea"'), is made of hand-picked leaves plucked before gogu (20–21 April). The ideal steeping temperature for ujeon tea is 50 °C (122 °F).
- Sejak
  Sejak (세작; 細雀; lit. '"thin sparrow"'), or dumul-cha (두물차; lit. '"second flush tea"'), is made of hand-picked leaves plucked after gogu (20–21 April) but before ipha (5–6 May). The tea is also called jakseol (작설; 雀舌; lit. '"sparrow tongue"') as the tea leaves are plucked when they are about the size of a sparrow's tongue. The ideal steeping temperature for sejak tea is 60–70 °C (140–158 °F).
- Jungjak
  Jungjak (중작; 中雀; lit. '"medium sparrow"'), or semul-cha (세물차; lit. '"third flush tea"'), is made of leaves plucked after ipha (5–6 May) until the mid May. The ideal steeping temperature for jungjak tea is 70–80 °C (158–176 °F).
- Daejak
  Daejak (대작; 大雀; lit. '"big sparrow"'), or kkeunmul-cha (끝물차; lit. '"final flush tea"'), is made of tea leaves plucked in late May and after. It is usually made into tea bags or used in cooking. The ideal steeping temperature for daejak tea is 80–90 °C (176–194 °F).

The mode of preparation also differs:

- Ipcha (yeopcha)
  The synonyms ipcha (잎차; lit. '"leaf tea"') and yeopcha (엽차; 葉茶; lit. '"leaf tea"') refer to loose leaf tea, often in contrast to tea in tea bags. As the words mean "leaf tea", they can also be used in contrast to powdered tea.
- Garucha (malcha)
  The synonyms garucha (가루차; lit. '"powder tea"') and malcha (말차; 末茶; lit. '"powder tea"') refer to powdered tea.

Leaf teas are processed either by roasting or steaming.

- Deokkeum-cha (bucho-cha)
  Roasting is the most common and traditional way of tea processing in Korea. Also translated into "pan-fried tea", the deokkeum-cha (덖음차; lit. '"roasted tea"') or bucho-cha (부초차; 麩炒茶; lit. '"roasted tea"') varieties are richer in flavour.
- Jeungje-cha
  Steaming is less popular in Korean green tea processing, but the method is still used in temple cuisine. Tea prepared with steamed tea leaves, called jeungje-cha (증제차; 蒸製茶; lit. '"steamed tea"'), are more vivid in colour.

Southern, warmer regions such as Boseong in South Jeolla Province, Hadong in South Gyeongsang Province, and Jeju Island are famous for producing high-quality tea leaves.

- Banya-cha
  Banya-cha (반야차; 般若茶; lit. '"prajñā tea"') is one of the most renowned Korean green teas. This steamed tea is developed by Buddhist monks in Boseong. The tea is grown on sandy loam near mountains and sea. The word banya is a Korean transliteration of the Buddhist concept prajñā.
- Jungno-cha
  Jungno-cha (죽로차; 竹露茶; lit. '"bamboo dew tea"') is one of the most renowned Korean green teas. The roasted variety of tea is made of tea leaves grown among the bamboo in Gimhae, Hadong, and Jinju in South Gyeongsang Province.

Green tea can be blended with other ingredients.

- Hyeonmi-nokcha
  Nokcha (green tea) blended with hyeonmi-cha (brown rice tea) is called hyeonmi-nokcha (현미녹차; 玄米綠茶; lit. '"brown rice green tea"').
- Remon-nokcha
  Nokcha (green tea) blended with lemon is called remon-nokcha (레몬 녹차; lit. '"lemon green tea"').

=== Vietnam ===
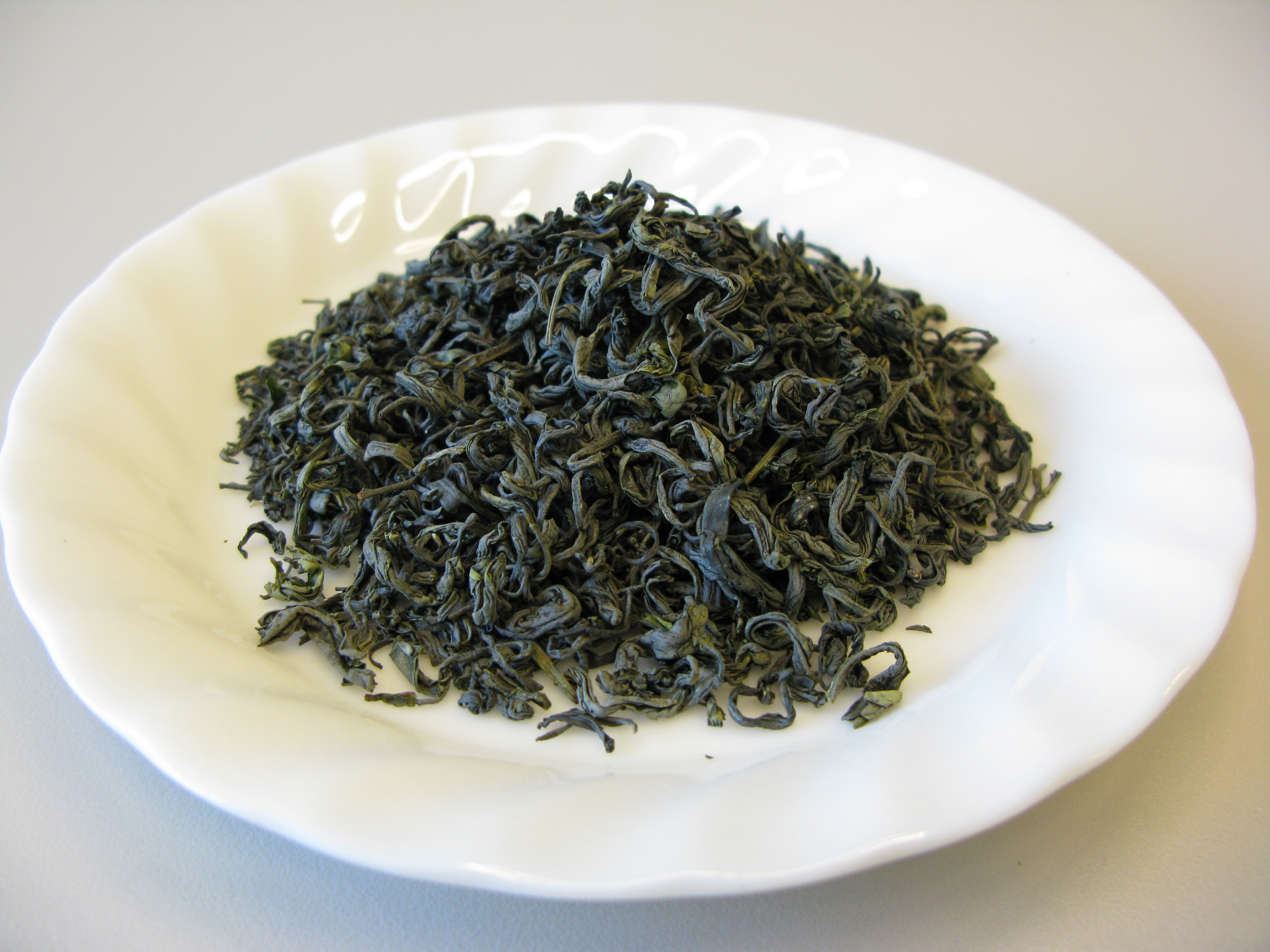
Thái Nguyên green tea

Green tea is the most popular tea among the Vietnamese people. In 2011, it accounted for over 63% of overall retail volume sales. Vietnamese tea culture is ancient, but large scale cultivation was introduced in the late 19th century by French colonists who ran the first plantations in the Phú Thọ area.

Though less well known than Japanese and Chinese green teas, there are various types of Vietnamese green tea and various cultivars. They have recently entered the international market, usually at lower prices. Vietnam is fifth in the world for tea production today.

There is a long tradition of growing and processing green tea in the Thái Nguyên area, north of Hanoi, which has been called the "cradle" of Vietnamese tea. This region is now known for its green tea, which is shipped internationally.

There are also many scented varieties of Vietnamese green tea, most of which are scented with a certain flower petals. These include:

- Lotus tea (trà sen), scented with Lotus flowers, sometimes the petals will be mixed into the tea leaves.
- Jasmine tea (trà lài), scented with jasmine
- Chrysanthemum tea (trà cúc)
- Aglaia tea (trà ngâu, tea infused with the flower from the Aglaia duperreana plant)
- Trà sói, tea infused with the flower from the Chloranthaceae family.
- Trà sâm dứa, made from a herbal mix of green tea, jasmine, Aglaia duperreana flower, basil and pandan leaves.

== Extracts ==
Polyphenols found in green tea include epigallocatechin gallate, epicatechin gallate, epicatechins and flavonoids, which collectively have no proven biological effects in humans.

Extracts are sold as dietary supplements in liquid, powder, capsule, and tablet forms, and may contain up to 17.4% of their total weight in caffeine, though decaffeinated versions are also available.

Green tea extract is usable as a clean label food preservative, protecting fats from rancidity. The oil-soluble form used is palmitoylated green tea catechins, ruled generally recognized as safe in 2020.

== Health effects ==
Brewed, regular green tea
Nutritional value per 100 g (3.5 oz)
- Energy: 4 kJ (0.96 kcal)
- Carbohydrates: 0 g
- Fat: 0 g
- Protein: 0.2 g
Vitamins and minerals
Vitamins	Quantity %DV^{†}
Thiamine (B1)	1% 0.007 mg
Riboflavin (B2)	5% 0.06 mg
Niacin (B3)	0% 0.03 mg
Vitamin B6	0% 0.005 mg
Vitamin C	0% 0.3 mg
Minerals	Quantity %DV^{†}
Calcium	0% 0 mg
Iron	0% 0.02 mg
Magnesium	0% 1 mg
Manganese	8% 0.18 mg
Potassium	0% 8 mg
Sodium	0% 1 mg
- Other constituents: Quantity
- Water: 99.9 g
- Caffeine: 12 mg
- Link to Full USDA Nutrient Report
- ^{†}Percentages estimated using US recommendations for adults, except for potassium, which is estimated based on expert recommendation from the National Academies.

Regular green tea is 99.9% water, provides 1 kcal per 100 mL serving, is devoid of significant micronutrient content (table), and contains caffeine and phytochemicals, such as polyphenols.

Numerous claims have been made for the health benefits of green tea, but human clinical research has not found good evidence of benefit. In 2011, a panel of scientists published a report on the claims for health effects at the request of the European Commission: in general they found that the claims made for green tea were not supported by sufficient scientific evidence. Although green tea may enhance mental alertness due to its caffeine content, there is only weak, inconclusive evidence that regular consumption of green tea affects the risk of cancer or cardiovascular diseases, and there is no evidence that it benefits weight loss.

In some cases of excessive consumption, green tea extract is hepatotoxic with evidence of liver damage. A 2020 review by the Cochrane Collaboration listed some potential adverse effects of green tea extract including gastrointestinal disorders, higher levels of liver enzymes, and, more rarely, insomnia, raised blood pressure, and skin reactions.

=== Cancer ===
Cancer Council Australia and Cancer Research UK have stated that there is not enough reliable evidence that green tea can prevent cancer. The National Cancer Institute have noted that "the evidence regarding the potential benefits of tea consumption in relation to cancer is inconclusive at present".

Green tea interferes with the chemotherapy drug bortezomib (Velcade) and other boronic acid-based proteasome inhibitors, and should be avoided by people taking these medications.

=== Cardiovascular disease ===
A meta-analysis of observational studies reported an increase in one cup of green tea per day was correlated with slightly lower risk of death from cardiovascular causes. Green tea consumption may be correlated with a reduced risk of stroke. Meta-analyses of randomized controlled trials found that green tea consumption for 3–6 months may produce small reductions (about 2–3 mm Hg each) in systolic and diastolic blood pressures. A separate systematic review and meta-analysis of randomized controlled trials found that consumption of 5–6 cups of green tea per day was associated with a small reduction in systolic blood pressure (2 mmHg), but did not lead to a significant difference in diastolic blood pressure.

=== Glycemic control ===
Green tea consumption lowers fasting blood sugar but in clinical studies the beverage's effect on haemoglobin A1c and fasting insulin levels was inconsistent.

=== Hyperlipidemia ===
Drinking green tea or taking green tea supplements decreases the blood concentration of total cholesterol (about 3–7 mg/dL), LDL cholesterol (about 2 mg/dL), and does not affect the concentration of HDL cholesterol or triglycerides. A 2013 Cochrane meta-analysis of longer-term randomized controlled trials (>3 months duration) concluded that green tea consumption lowers total and LDL cholesterol concentrations in the blood.

=== Inflammation ===
A 2015 systematic review and meta-analysis of 11 randomized controlled trials found that green tea consumption was not significantly associated with lower plasma levels of C-reactive protein levels (a marker of inflammation).

=== Genital warts ===
In 2006, the United States Food and Drug Administration approved an ointment containing green tea extract as a prescription drug for treating genital warts.

=== Weight loss ===
There is no good evidence that green tea aids in weight loss or weight maintenance.

=== Potential for liver toxicity ===
Excessive consumption of green tea and green tea extract has been associated with hepatotoxicity and liver failure, in particular due to their content of epigallocatechin gallate (EGCG). In 2017, Health Canada recommended a warning label and suggested that green tea extract should only be taken by adults. Other regulatory agencies, such as the European Food Safety Authority (EFSA) and the Food Standards Agency also reviewed the safety of green tea and green tea extract. In particular longer-term intake of green tea extracts containing more than 800 mg of EGCG per day resulted in an elevation of liver enzymes and potential hepatotoxicity in some people. There was insufficient data to establish a safe dose or acceptable daily intake.

The average intake of EGCG from green tea is generally below 800 mg per day. In the European Union, average intake of EGCG from green tea is between 90 to 300 mg per day, but intake can exceed 850 mg per day. According to EFSA, the consumption of green tea prepared in the traditional way is safe, and only rare cases of liver damage occur.

== See also ==
- Chinese tea culture
- Japanese tea ceremony
- Korean tea
- List of unproven and disproven cancer treatments
- List of Chinese teas
- White tea
- Yellow tea

== Other reading ==
- Battle, Will (2017). The World Tea Encyclopaedia: The World of Tea Explored and Explained from Bush to Brew. Market Harborough, UK: Troubador. ISBN 978-1-78589-313-1.
- Benn, James A. (2015). Tea in China: A Religious and Cultural History. Hong Kong: Hong Kong University Press. ISBN 978-988-8208-73-9.
- Chow, Kit Boey; Kramer, Ione (1990). All the Tea in China. San Francisco: China Books. ISBN 978-0-8351-2194-1.
- Farris, William Wayne (2019). A Bowl for a Coin: A Commodity History of Japanese Tea. Honolulu: University of Hawaii Press. hdl:20.500.12657/45612. ISBN 978-0-8248-7660-9.
- Heiss, Mary Lou; Heiss, Robert J. (2007). The Story of Tea: A Cultural History and Drinking Guide. Berkeley: Ten Speed Press. ISBN 978-1-58008-745-2.
- Mair, Victor H.; Hoh, Erling (2009). The True History of Tea. London Berkeley: Thames & Hudson. ISBN 978-0-500-25146-1.
