= Tianhuangping Pumped Storage Power Station =

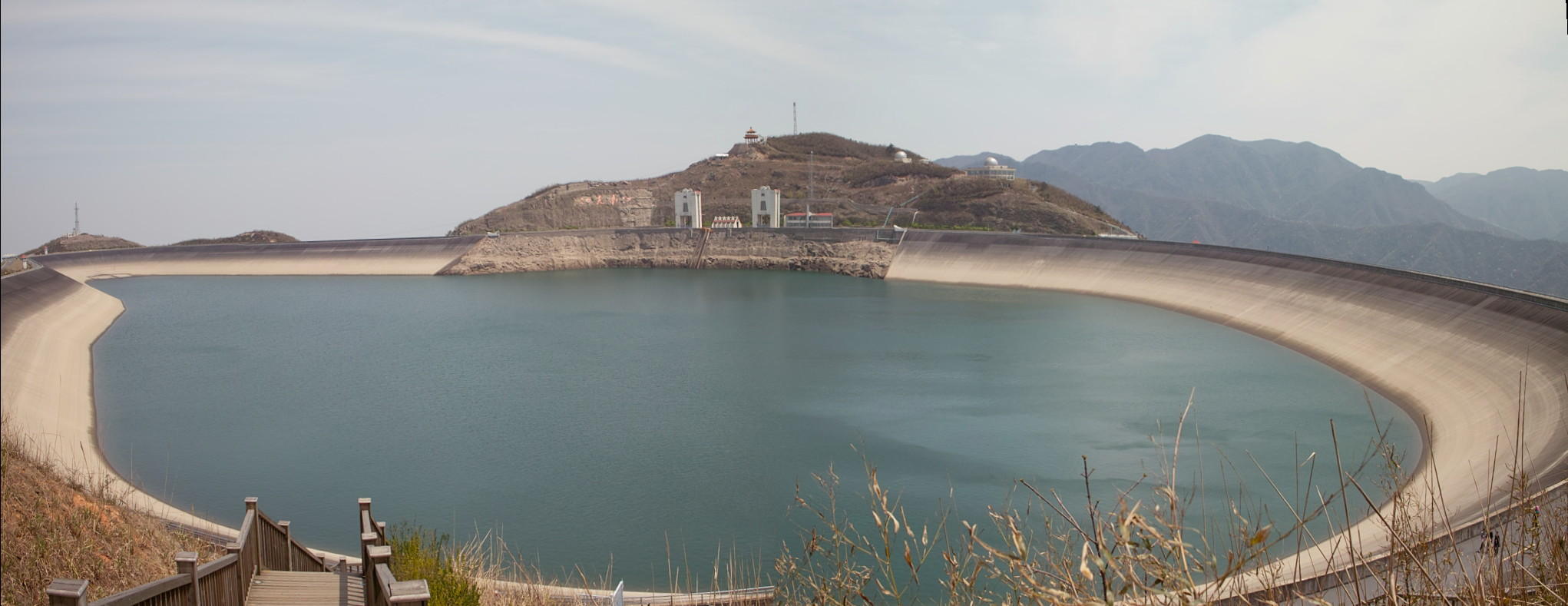
- Upper reservoir
- Country: China
- Location: Tianhuangping, Anji County of Zhejiang Province, China
- Coordinates: 30°28′13″N 119°36′21″E
- Status: Operational
- Construction began: 1993
- Opening date: 2004
- Construction cost: $900 million USD

Upper reservoir
- Creates: Tianhuangping Upper
- Total capacity: 6,760,000 m^{3} (5,480 acre⋅ft) (Normal)

Lower reservoir
- Creates: Tianhuangping Lower
- Total capacity: 6,770,000 m^{3} (239,000,000 cu ft) (Normal)

Power Station
- Hydraulic head: 887 m (2,910 ft)
- Pump-generators: 6 reversible Francis turbines
- Installed capacity: 1,836 MW; 2,016 MW (Planned)

The Tianhuangping Pumped Storage Power Station (Chinese: 天荒坪抽水蓄能电站) is a pumped-storage power station in Tianhuangping, Anji County of Huzhou, Zhejiang Province, China. The power station has an installed capacity of 1,836 megawatts (2,462,000 hp) utilizing 6 reversible Francis turbines. Construction began in 1993 and the power station was completed in 2004.

== Operation ==
=== Tianhuangping Dam ===
Situated on the Daxi Creek, the Tianhuangping Dam creates the power station's lower reservoir. The concrete face rock-fill dam is 72 metres (236 ft) high and 577 metres (1,893 ft) long. The dam creates a reservoir that can store 6,770,000 cubic metres (5,490 acre⋅ft) of water and contains an uncontrolled side-weir spillway that can discharge a design level of 536 cubic metres per second (18,900 cu ft/s).

=== Upper reservoir ===
From the lower reservoir, water is pumped up into the upper reservoir which has a normal storage capacity of 6,760,000 cubic metres (5,480 acre⋅ft). The upper reservoir is artificial and cut into the mountain and created with the assistance of four saddle dams. When power is being generated, the water leaves the reservoir and falls through two 882 metres (2,894 ft) long and 7 metres (23 ft) diameter penstocks down towards the power station which is above the lower reservoir. Before reaching the reversible turbines, the water branches off into six branch pipes.

=== Power station ===
The six branch pipes feed water into the six turbines. Each reversible Francis turbine has a 306 megawatts (410,000 hp) installed capacity and 336 megawatts (451,000 hp) maximum capacity. The turbines and generators are stored in an underground power house measuring 198.7 metres (652 ft) long, 21 metres (69 ft) wide and 47.7 metres (156 ft) high. After power is produced, the water is discharged back into the lower reservoir and the entire process can repeat.

== See also ==
- List of power stations in China
- List of Dam in China
