= Aracha =

Japanese green tea made using entire leaf

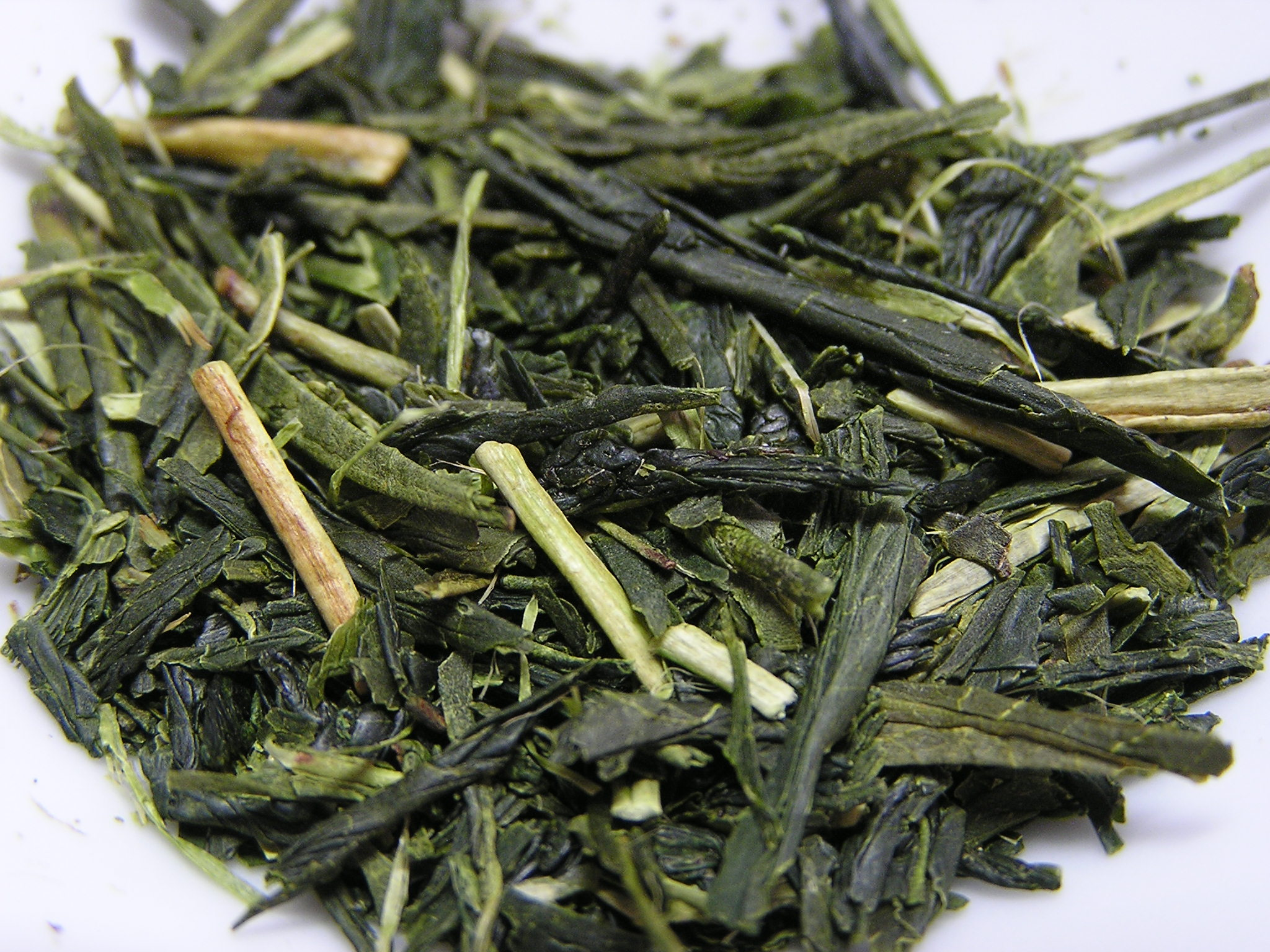
- Type: Green
- Other names: Crude Tea or Unrefined
- Origin: Japan
- Quick description: Deep Green in colour with a bold taste

Aracha (荒茶), also known as unrefined or crude tea, is a type of green tea produced in Japan. Unlike most other teas, aracha green tea is produced using the entire leaf of the tea plant, including the leaf blade, leaf stem, broken particles of the leaf, and the fine leaf hair. This often gives the tea a deep green colour and a bold taste though variations are greatly affected by the cultivation and production processes.

After leaves are harvested by farmers in Japan, they are then processed at either private or often communal processing facilities where they are steamed, rolled, and dried. At this point, the tea is called aracha and is ready to be sold into the tea distribution channel, where wholesale brokers or large tea companies will purchase the aracha. The tea then is "finished"—the parts of the leaves are sorted, sized, graded, and blended to produce sencha tea with specific flavor profiles.

== See also ==
- Green tea
- List of Japanese teas
