= Sejak =

Korean green tea

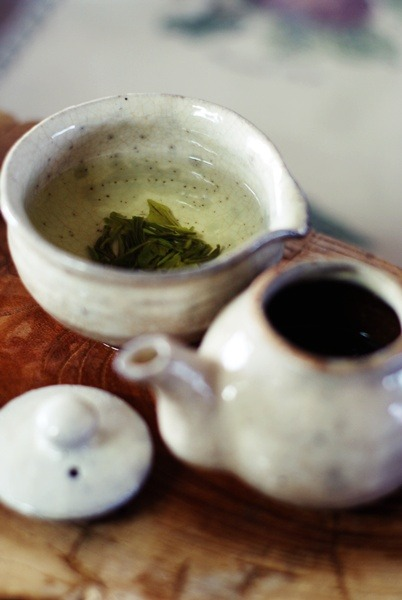
- Sejak green tea from Hadong County
- Type: Nokcha (green tea)
- Origin: Korea
- Ingredients: Second-flush tea leaves

Korean name
- Hangul: 세작
- Hanja: 細雀
- Lit.: thin sparrow
- RR: sejak
- MR: sejak
- IPA: [se.dʑak̚]

Alternate name
- Hangul: 두물차
- Hanja: 두물茶
- Lit.: second flush tea
- RR: dumulcha
- MR: tumulch'a
- IPA: [tu.mul.tɕʰa]

Epithet
- Hangul: 작설
- Hanja: 雀舌
- Lit.: sparrow tongue
- RR: jakseol
- MR: chaksŏl
- IPA: [tɕak.s͈ʌl]

Sejak (Korean: 세작; Hanja: 細雀; lit. 'thin sparrow'), also called dumul-cha (두물차; lit. 'second flush tea'), refers to nokcha (green tea) made of young, tender leaves and buds hand-plucked after gogu ("grain rain", 20–21 April) but before ipha ("advent of summer", 5–6 May). Also called jakseol (작설; 雀舌; lit. 'sparrow tongue') as the tea leaves are plucked when they are about the size of a sparrow's tongue, sejak is best steeped at a temperature of 60–70 °C (140–158 °F).
