= Dipu =

Dipu 递铺街道
- Subdistrict
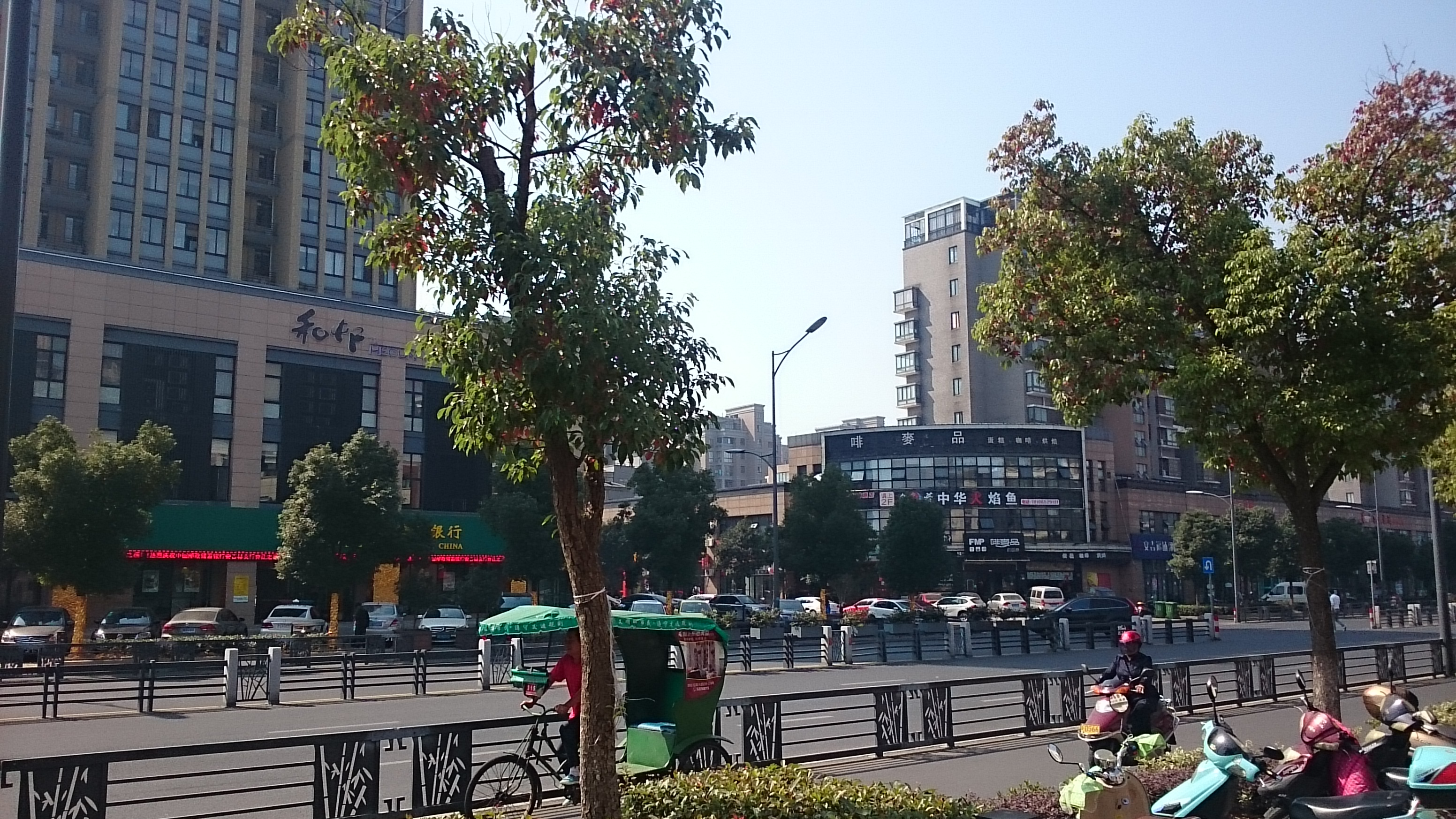
- Interactive map of Dipu
- Coordinates: 30°38′11″N 119°41′32″E
- Country: People's Republic of China
- Province: Zhejiang
- Prefecture-level city: Huzhou
- County: Anji
- Time zone: UTC+8 (China Standard)
- Postal code: 313300
- Area code: 0572

Dipu (simplified Chinese: 递铺; traditional Chinese: 遞舖; pinyin: Dìpù) is the main town and the seat of Anji County, in northwest Zhejiang province, China. It covers an area of 392 km^{2} (151 sq mi) and has a population of 158,000. There are 48 villages and 12 communities within its area. Zhejiang Provincial Highway 4 runs through the town.

Dipu is 200 km (120 mi) from Shanghai and 65 km (40 mi) from Hangzhou, the provincial capital. It is within a 3-hour drive of many other cities in the Yangtze River Delta, including Ningbo, Suzhou and Nanjing. The name of the town origins from "Post" because the town was a mail post in ancient China. There is a Post Plaza (Chinese: 驿站广场; pinyin: Yìzhàn Guǎngchǎng) on the bank of the town's main river.
