= Ujeon =

Korean green tea variety

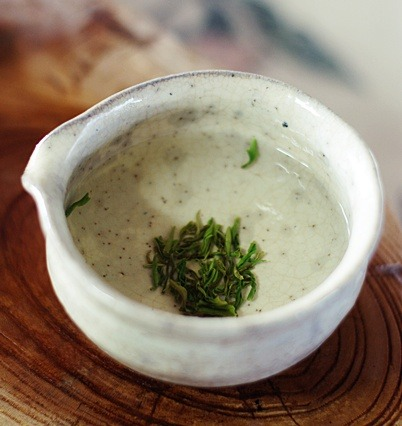
- Ujeon green tea from Hadong County
- Type: Nokcha (green tea)
- Country of origin: Korea
- Ingredients: First-flush tea leaves

Korean name
- Hangul: 우전
- Hanja: 雨前
- RR: ujeon
- MR: ujŏn
- IPA: [u.dʑʌn]

Alternate name
- Hangul: 첫물차
- Hanja: 첫물茶
- RR: cheonmulcha
- MR: ch'ŏnmulch'a
- IPA: [tɕʰʌn.mul.tɕʰa]

Ujeon (Korean: 우전; Hanja: 雨前; lit. pre-rain), also called cheonmul-cha (첫물차; lit. first flush tea), refers to nokcha (green tea) made of young, tender leaves and buds hand-plucked before gogu ("grain rain", 20–21 April). The delicate tea has sweet, soft, and subtle flavor profile, and is best steeped at a temperature of 50 °C (122 °F).

Korean ujeon is equivalent to Chinese mingqian ("pre-Qingming") and Japanese shincha ("new tea").
