= Anji County =

Anji 安吉县 Anchi
- County
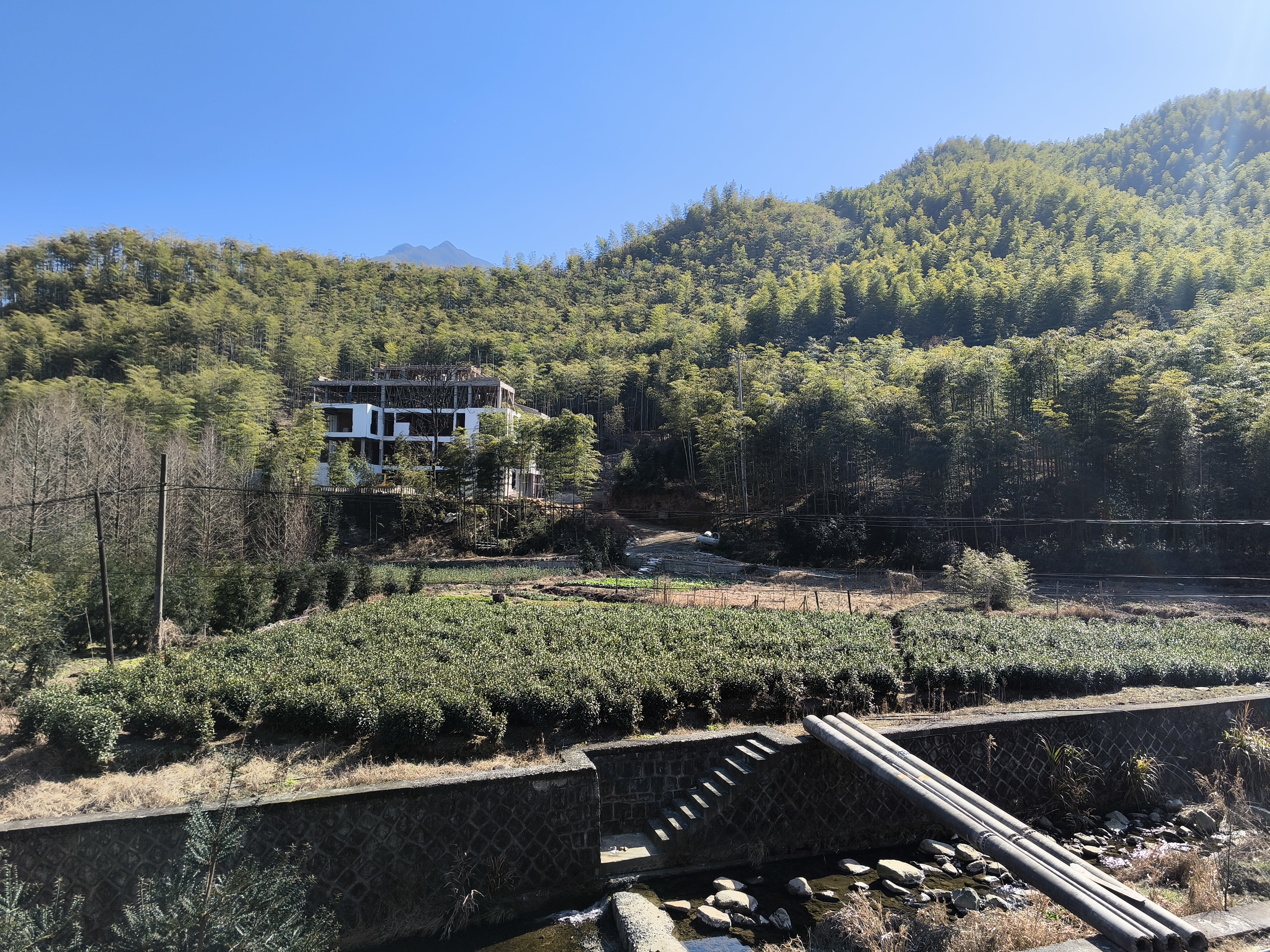
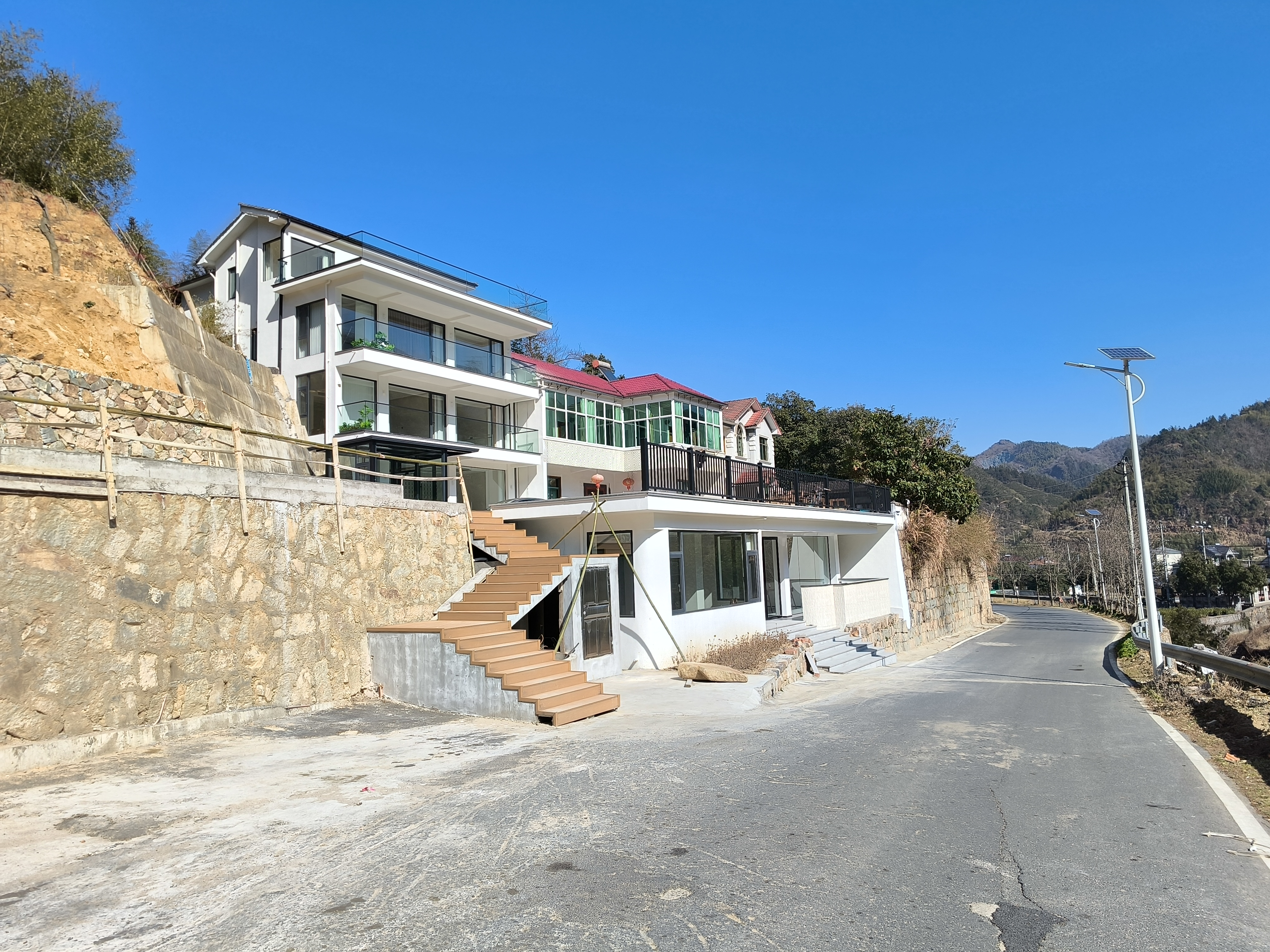
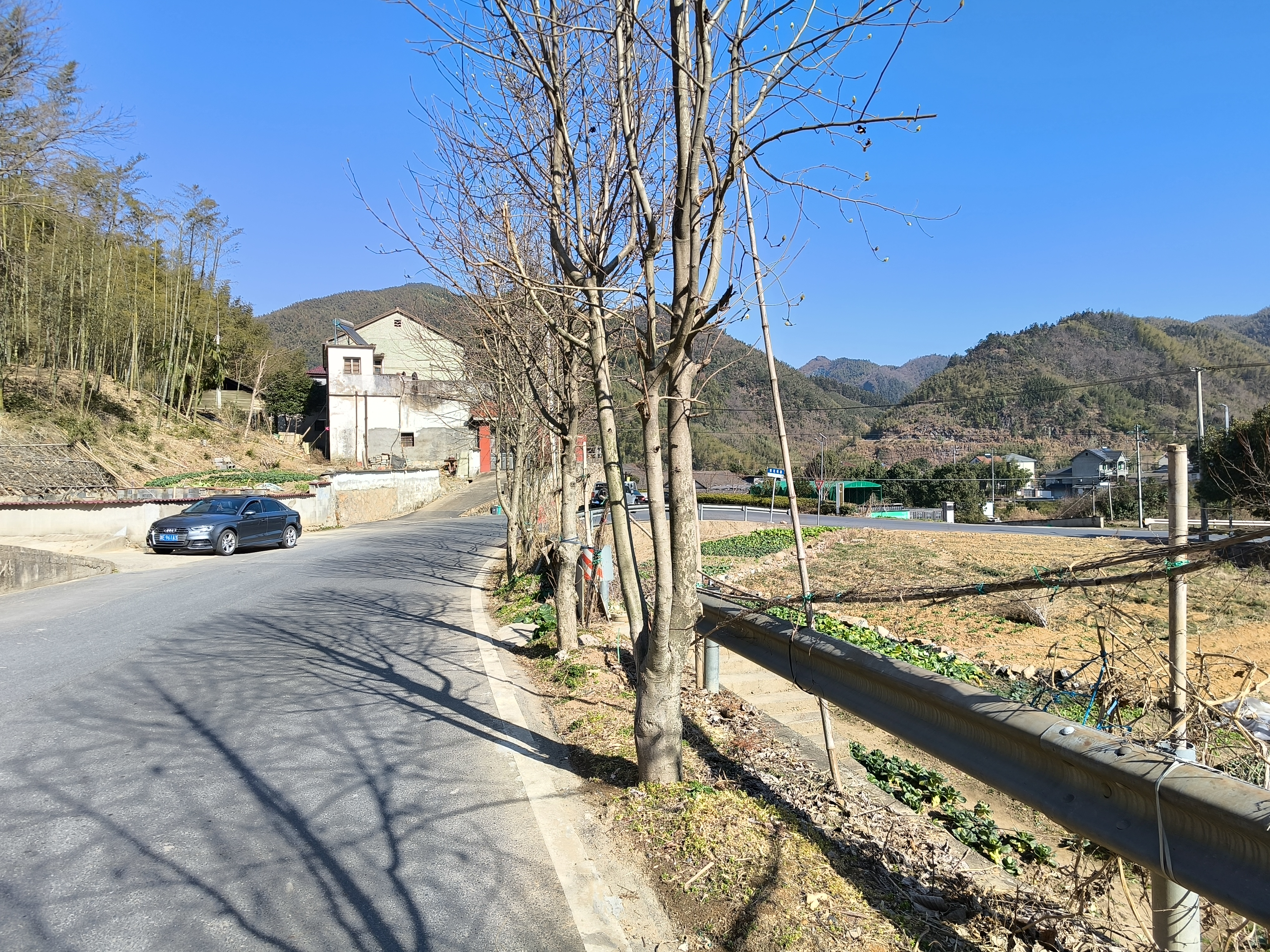
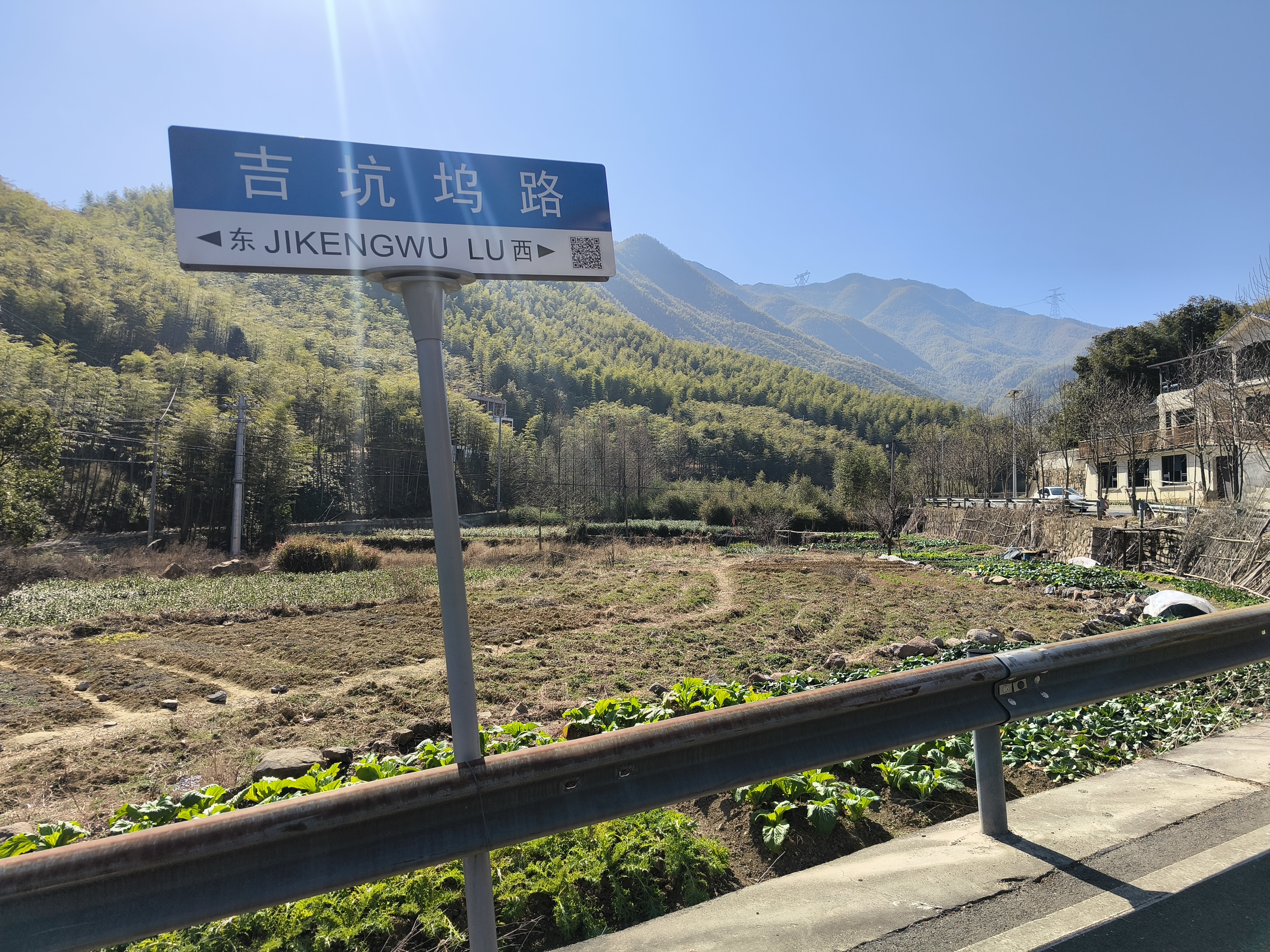
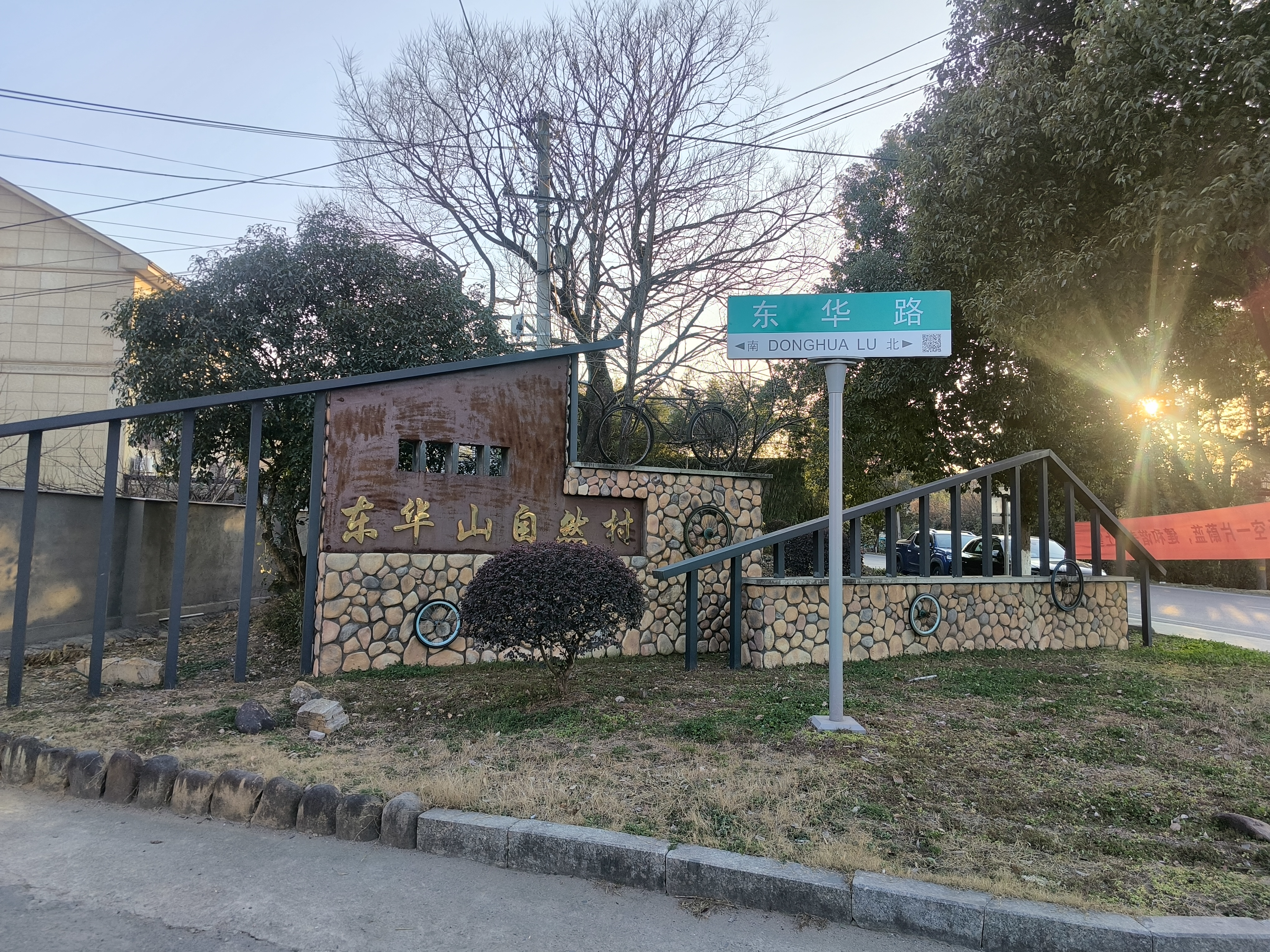

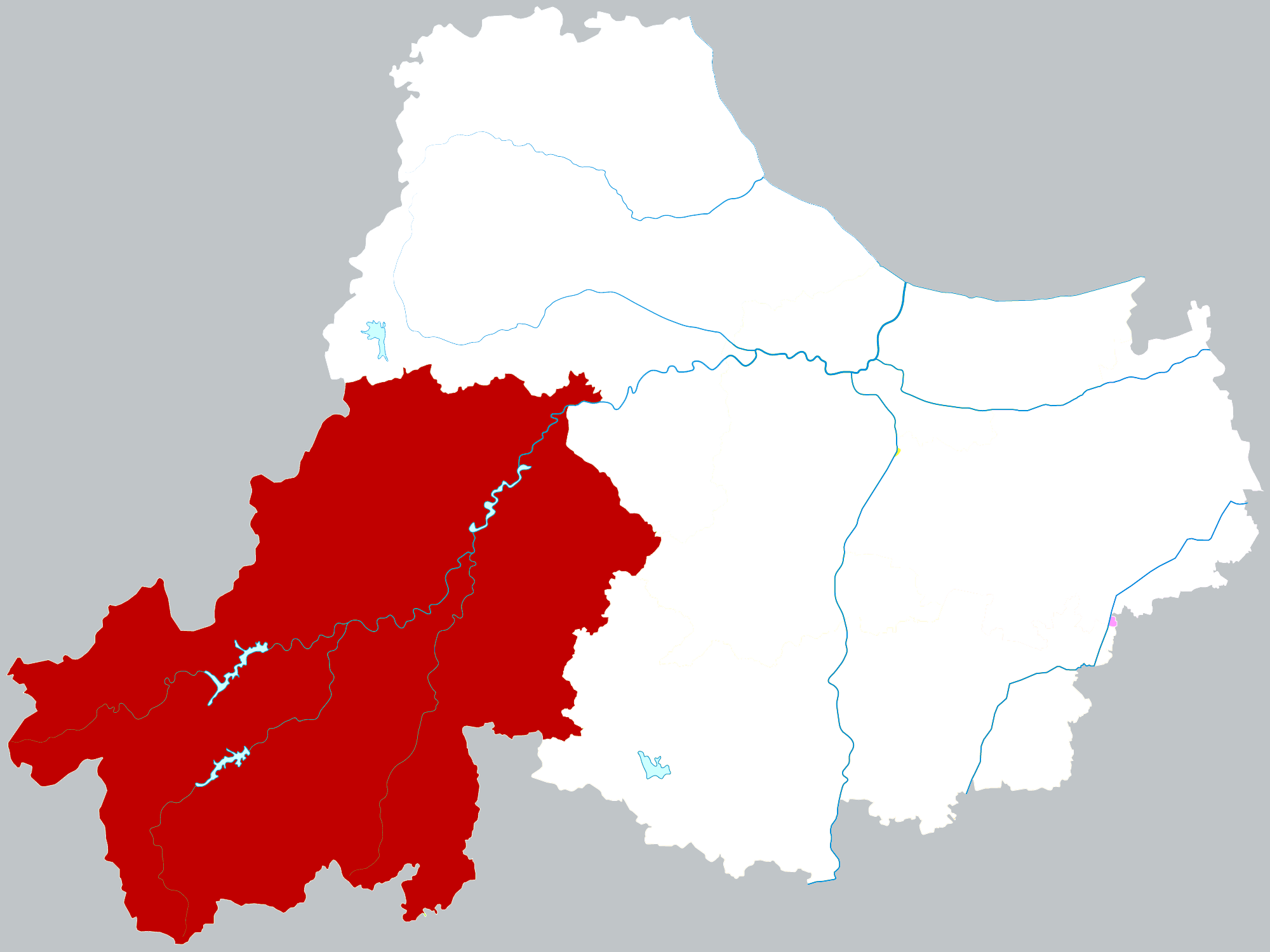
- Location of Anji County within Huzhou

- Location of the seat in Zhejiang
- Coordinates: 30°37′48″N 119°40′17″E
- Country: People's Republic of China
- Province: Zhejiang
- Prefecture-level city: Huzhou
- Origins: 200 AD
- Seat: Changshuo Subdistrict

Government
  - County Head: Ning Yun

Area
  - Total: 1,886 km^{2} (728 sq mi)
- Elevation: 20 to 1,600 m (66 to 5,249 ft)

Population (2013)
  - Total: 461,800
  - Density: 244.9/km^{2} (634/sq mi)
- Time zone: UTC+8 (China Standard Time (CST))
- Postal code: 313300 to 313310
- Area code: 0572
- Languages: Anji dialect, Mandarin Chinese, Southern Min
- Website: www.anji.gov.cn

Anji County (simplified Chinese: 安吉县; traditional Chinese: 安吉縣; pinyin: Ānjí Xiàn) is a county in the prefecture-level city of Huzhou in northwestern Zhejiang province, China. The county spans an area of 1,886 square kilometres (728 mi^{2}), with a population of 461,800 as of the end of 2013. Located within the Yangtze River Delta, Anji County is a short distance from Shanghai, Hangzhou, and Nanjing.

Anji County is known for its lush natural environment, with over 70% of the county's area covered in forest and other vegetation. In particular, Anji County is known for its bamboo production. The county has 60,000 hectares (150,000 acres) of bamboo groves containing over 40 different species of bamboo.

The county is home to the Tianhuangping Pumped Storage Power Station.

== Toponymy ==
Anji County is named after a verse from the Classic of Poetry.

== History ==
The Shangmakan site, a Paleolithic archeological site, is located within present-day Anji County.

Anji County was established in 185 CE.

During the 1990s, it took more than two hours to travel to Hangzhou by bus. Poor transportation isolated Anji from the rest of Zhejiang Province, and for many years its economy remained underdeveloped. From 1997 to 2000, highways were built to Hangzhou and Huzhou, and from 2000 to 2002, highways connecting to National Highway G318 were constructed. The provincial highways within its boundary were also widened. Now the highway system traversing the entire boundary has been completed, and it takes less than three hours to reach Shanghai, Nanjing or Suzhou, and less than one hour to get to Hangzhou and Huzhou.

== Geography ==
Anji County is located within the Yangtze Delta, where the Yangtze meets the East China Sea. The Tianmu Mountains run through southwest portion of the county, with the county's highest point, Longwang Mountain, reaching 1,587.4 metres (5,208 ft) in elevation. Xitiao River, the county's longest river, flows from the southwest mountains northeast, before eventually emptying into Lake Tai.

Anji County is bordered by Changxing County to the north, Wuxing District and Deqing County to the east, Yuhang District and Lin'an District (both in Hangzhou) to the south, and by Ningguo and Guangde to the west (both in Xuancheng, Anhui). The county is located 65 kilometres (40 mi) north of Hangzhou's urban core, and 223 kilometres (139 mi) to the west of Shanghai's.

== Climate ==
Climate data for Anji, elevation 72 m (236 ft), (1991–2020 normals, extremes 1981–present)
Month	Jan	Feb	Mar	Apr	May	Jun	Jul	Aug	Sep	Oct	Nov	Dec	Year
Record high °C (°F)	24.8 (76.6)	28.6 (83.5)	35.4 (95.7)	36.1 (97.0)	37.2 (99.0)	38.8 (101.8)	40.7 (105.3)	40.9 (105.6)	38.6 (101.5)	35.5 (95.9)	30.1 (86.2)	25.4 (77.7)	40.9 (105.6)
Mean daily maximum °C (°F)	8.5 (47.3)	11.4 (52.5)	16.3 (61.3)	22.6 (72.7)	27.3 (81.1)	29.7 (85.5)	33.8 (92.8)	33.0 (91.4)	28.5 (83.3)	23.6 (74.5)	17.7 (63.9)	11.3 (52.3)	22.0 (71.6)
Daily mean °C (°F)	3.8 (38.8)	6.1 (43.0)	10.5 (50.9)	16.4 (61.5)	21.5 (70.7)	24.7 (76.5)	28.4 (83.1)	27.8 (82.0)	23.4 (74.1)	17.7 (63.9)	11.8 (53.2)	5.8 (42.4)	16.5 (61.7)
Mean daily minimum °C (°F)	0.3 (32.5)	2.2 (36.0)	6.0 (42.8)	11.4 (52.5)	16.6 (61.9)	20.8 (69.4)	24.4 (75.9)	24.2 (75.6)	19.6 (67.3)	13.4 (56.1)	7.4 (45.3)	1.7 (35.1)	12.3 (54.2)
Record low °C (°F)	−13.5 (7.7)	−10.0 (14.0)	−4.5 (23.9)	−1.6 (29.1)	5.7 (42.3)	11.0 (51.8)	17.4 (63.3)	17.1 (62.8)	7.8 (46.0)	0.2 (32.4)	−5.6 (21.9)	−12.4 (9.7)	−13.5 (7.7)
Average precipitation mm (inches)	85.9 (3.38)	81.1 (3.19)	120.2 (4.73)	104.2 (4.10)	127.7 (5.03)	238.1 (9.37)	190.3 (7.49)	202.2 (7.96)	116.5 (4.59)	81.3 (3.20)	72.2 (2.84)	58.3 (2.30)	1,478 (58.18)
Average precipitation days (≥ 0.1 mm)	12.9	12.0	14.7	13.6	13.4	15.7	14.7	15.9	12.2	8.6	10.3	9.7	153.7
Average snowy days	4.0	2.8	1.0	0	0	0	0	0	0	0	0.4	1.8	10
Average relative humidity (%)	78	76	74	72	72	79	78	79	80	78	79	77	77
Mean monthly sunshine hours	113.4	114.2	138.4	159.4	172.5	137.8	204.8	187.3	151.9	160.2	135.9	130.8	1,806.6
Percentage possible sunshine	35	36	37	41	41	33	48	46	41	46	43	42	41
Source: China Meteorological Administration

== Administrative divisions ==
As of 2021, there are the following 4 subdistricts, 8 towns and 3 townships in Anji County:

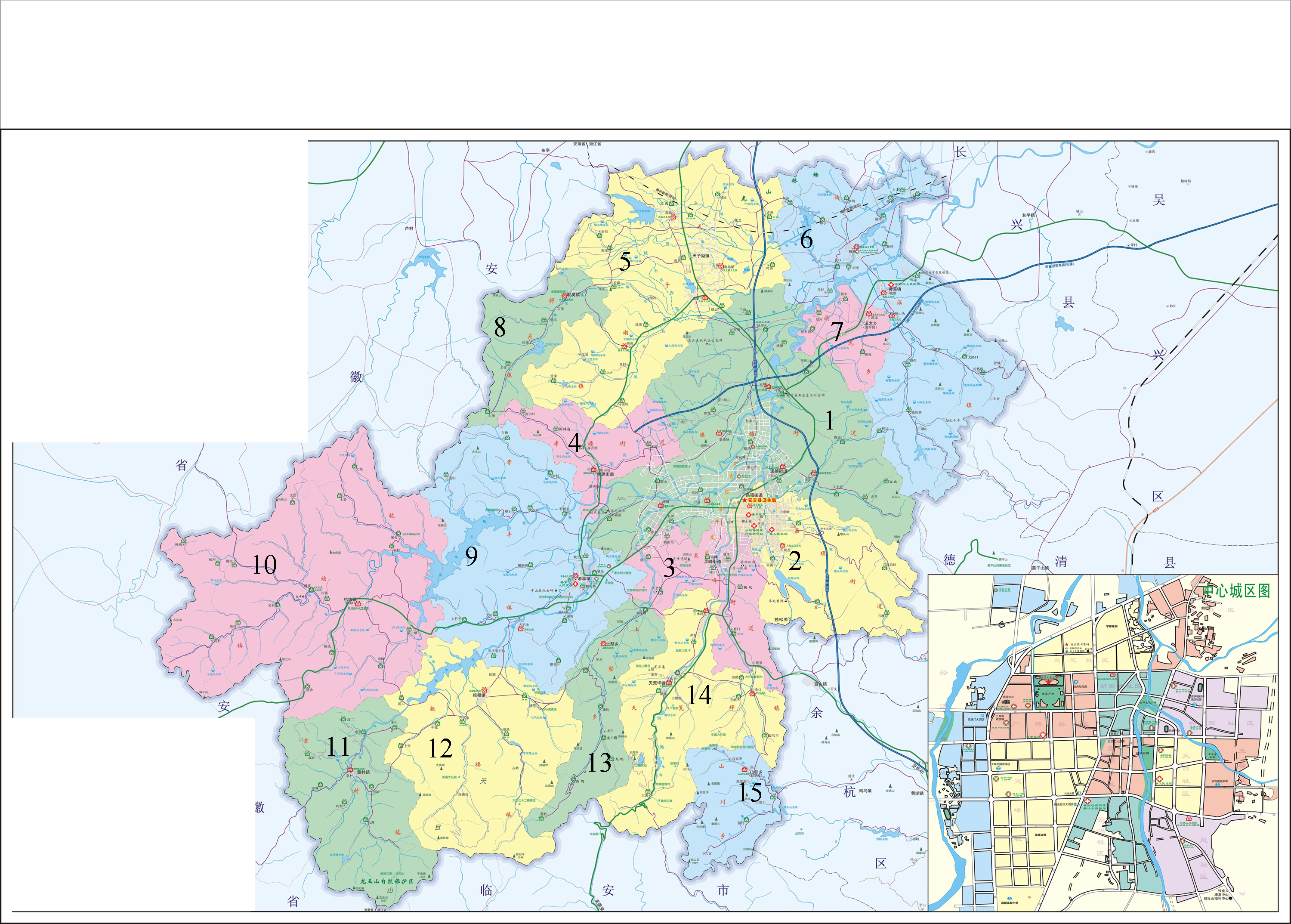
A map of township-level divisions in Anji County

No.	Towns or Subdistricts	Chinese name	No.	Towns or Subdistricts	Chinese name
1	Dipu Subdistrict	递铺街道	9	Xiaofeng	孝丰镇
2	Changshuo Subdistrict★	昌硕街道	10	Hanggai	杭垓镇
3	Lingfeng Subdistrict	灵峰街道	11	Zhangcun	章村镇
4	Xiaoyuan Subdistrict	孝源街道	12	Baofu	报福镇
5	Tianzihu	天子湖镇	13	Shangshu Township	上墅乡
6	Meixi	梅溪镇	14	Tianhuangping	天荒坪镇
7	Xilong Township	溪龙乡	15	Shanchuan Township	山川乡
8	Zhangwu	鄣吴镇			

★ Seat of the Anji County People's Government

These township-level divisions then, in turn, administer 215 village-level divisions.

== Economy ==
As of 2021, Anji County has a total gross domestic product (GDP) of 56.63 billion renminbi (RMB), an increase of 10.8% from 2020. Urban residents have a per capita disposable income of 65,750 RMB, while rural residents have a per capita disposable income of 39,495 RMB. In 2001, Anji County received $50 million USD in foreign investment.

=== Tourism ===
Tourism is an important part of Anji County's economy. As of 2013, the county received 10.44 million tourists. In 2001, Anji received 1.4 million tourists, earning it 310 million yuan, which made up 6.1% of the county's GDP.

The ecological tour area covers one-tenth of the county's total area. Anji produces 12 million commercial bamboo poles annually, ranking first nationwide. It also has China's largest bamboo nursery. The Anji Bamboo Garden is acknowledged by scholars within and outside China as containing the widest variety of bamboo to be found. It was formerly a bamboo grove research base that combined scientific research with teaching, and has received many foreign experts and scholars and officials from the International Bamboo and Rattan Organisation.

At the Longwang (Dragon King, deity of Chinese folk religion) Mountain Nature Reserve, lies the source of the Huangpu River, and the 800-hectare primeval forest there contains numerous flora and fauna under national protection; Amji's Salamander is only known from this reserve. The Huadong Pumping Storage Power Station, located in the Tianhuangping Scenic Area, is the largest in Asia and second largest worldwide. It is meant to blend in with the surrounding environment, and is a Chinese industrial demonstration project. A feasibility plan recently commenced on the 20 km^{2} (7.7 sq mi) British designed Huxi Ecological Garden.

=== Agricultural products ===
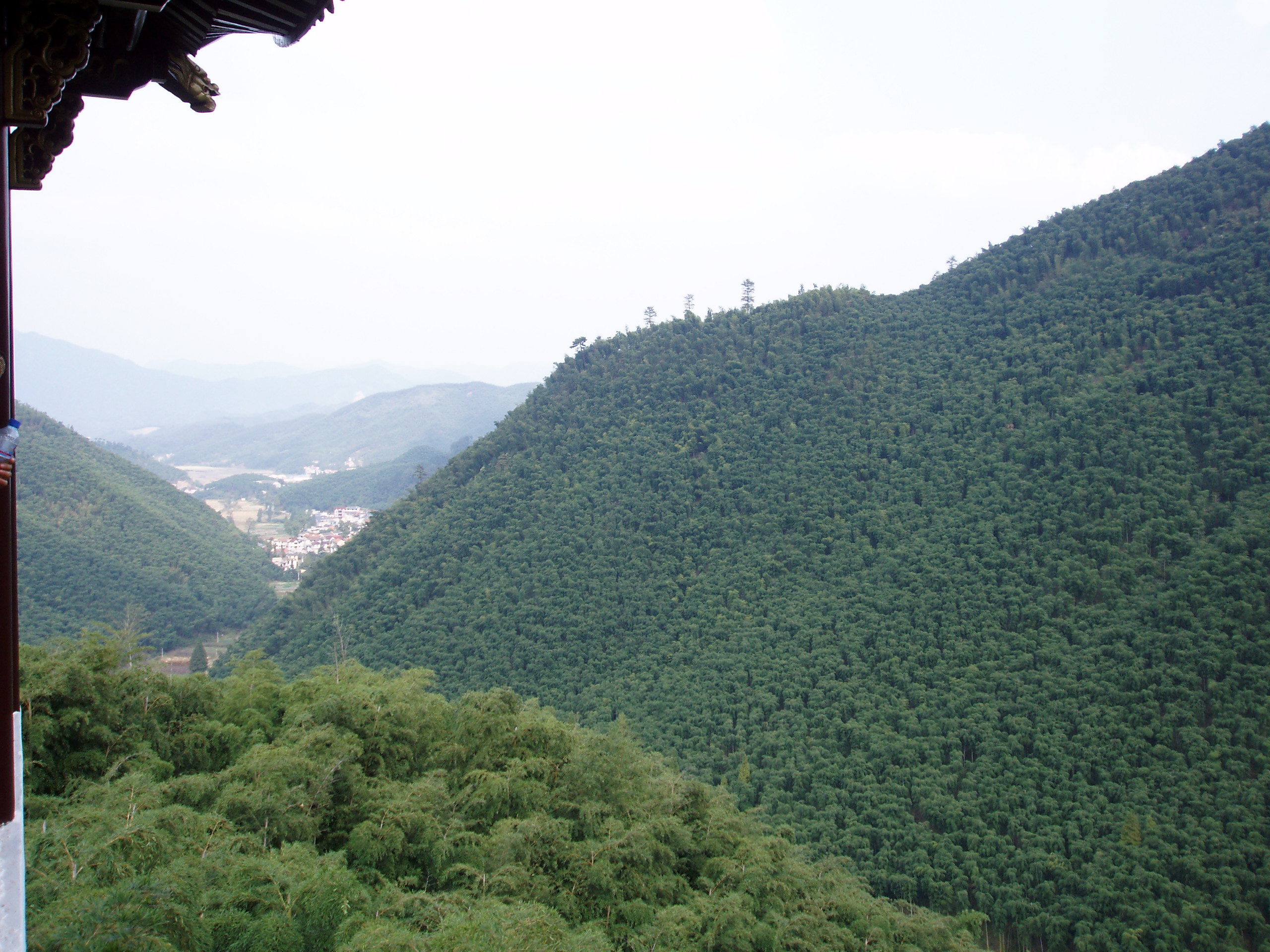
Bamboo forest

Local agricultural products include bamboo shoots, green tea, alpine vegetables, and flowers. Production bases for green products have been opened, and specialized markets for agricultural products and comprehensive wholesale markets built. In order further to supplement ecological tourism, agricultural sightseeing gardens that provide leisure activities have also been constructed. Pollution-free products currently make up 40 percent of the market, and the per capita income of farmers has increased steadily, from 3,708 yuan in 1998 to 4,556 yuan in 2001. Chain production is a characteristic of Anji's industry; bamboo, for instance, can be made into food, handicrafts, and building materials, and its remnants can also be utilized. Anji products are now exported to more than 20 countries and regions, and about one-fourth of the county's gross output value of agriculture and industry comes from bamboo-related industries.

== Notable people ==
- Wu Changshuo

== See also ==
- Clear waters and green mountains
- Crouching Tiger, Hidden Dragon
