= Anji bai cha =

Chinese green tea

Anji Bai Cha
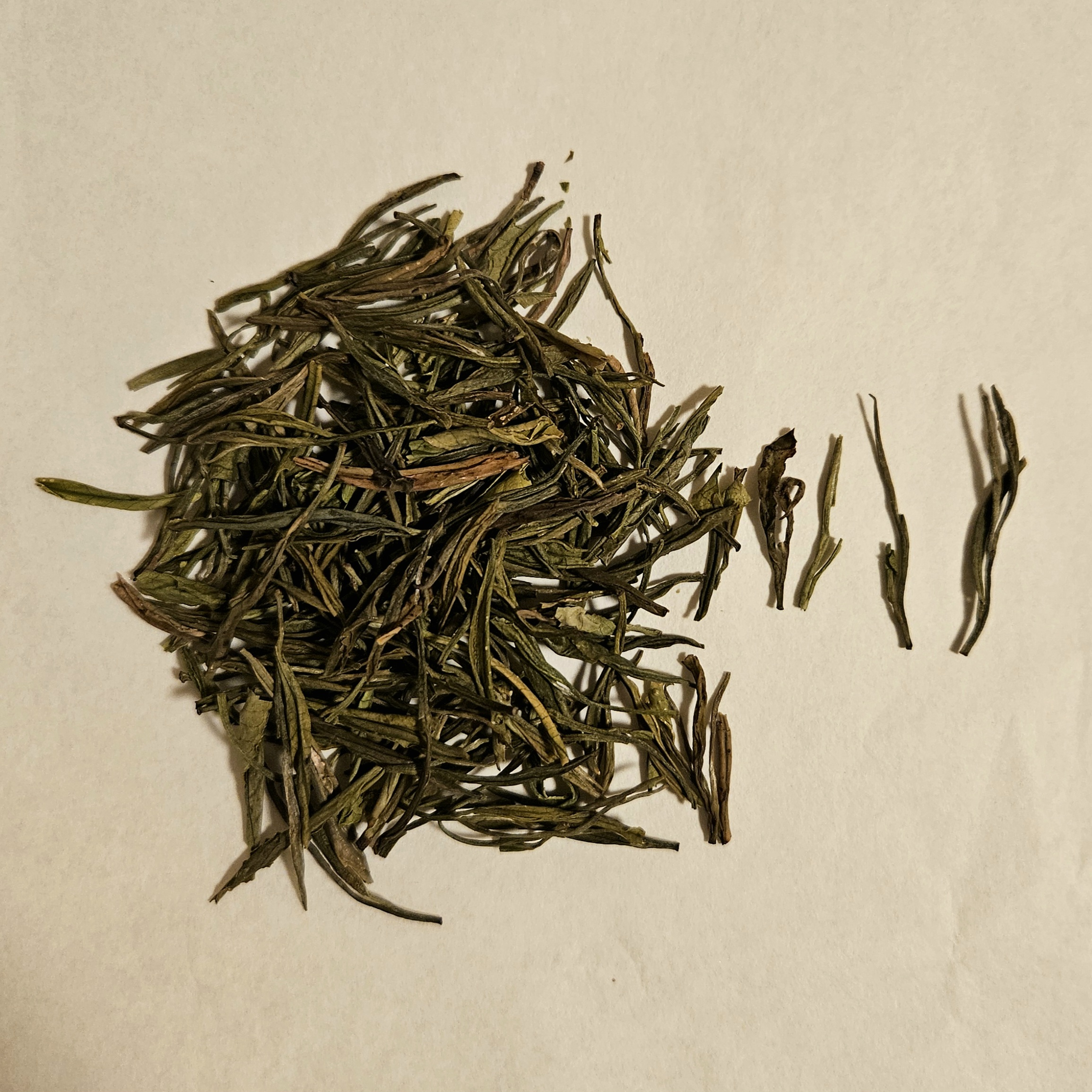
- Type: Green
- Other names: Anji white tea,安吉白茶
- Origin: Anji County, Zhejiang Province, China
- Quick description: Rare, large-leafed green tea

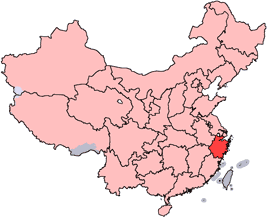
Anji bai cha is grown in Zhejiang province, China.

Anji bai (Chinese: 安吉白; pinyin: Ānjí bái; pronounced [án.tɕǐ pǎɪ]) or Anji white is a green tea originally produced in Anji County, Zhejiang Province, China. Now, it can also be found in Changxing County, Zhejiang Province, China.

This tea cultivar was discovered in 1982, is not as widely planted as other teas and has a short harvesting period; it is a comparatively rare tea, and as such, is among the most expensive teas in China.

It is called "white" tea although it is a green tea. This is because the leaves turn a jade-white colour during the low-temperature seasons in Anji. As the temperature rises, the leaves gradually return to their green colour. The processed, long, narrow leaves are yellow and have a recognisable fold along the length of the leaf.

A 2010 study found that the tea is high in polysaccharides which can inhibit the hemolysis of blood cells.

== See also ==
- List of Chinese teas
