= Xitiao River =

Coordinates: 30°35′31″N 119°39′18″E

Location
- Country: China

Physical characteristics
- Mouth
  - location: Lake Tai
- Length: 157 kilometres (98 mi)

The Xitiao River or West Tiao River (Chinese: 西苕溪) is located in Zhejiang Province, China. It flows through Huzhou before entering Lake Tai.
