= List of drinks named after places =

The following drinks were named after places.

== Non-alcoholic beverages ==
=== Coffee drinks ===
- Americano, diluted espresso, popularly believed to be after the habit of American soldiers in Italy in WW II.
- Armenian coffee –– Armenia
- Coffee, perhaps after the Kingdom of Kaffa, now in southwest Ethiopia
- Cuban espresso or Café Cubano — Cuba
- Georgia (coffee), after the state of Georgia, United States
- Greek frappé — Greece
- Indian filter coffee — India
- Ipoh white coffee, after the city of Ipoh, Perak, Malaysia
- Java, slang for coffee — named after the Indonesian island of Java
- Kurdish coffee after Kurdistan
- Marocchino, Italian for Moroccan
- Mazagran after the city of Mazagran, Algeria
- Mocha/Caffè mocha and Moka coffee, after the port city of Mocha in Yemen
- Mustang Coffee after the Mustang region of Nepal
- Thai iced coffee — Thailand
- Tenom coffee, after the town of Tenom, Sabah, northern Borneo, Malaysia
- Café Touba after the city of Touba, Senegal
- Turkish coffee — Turkey
- Vietnamese iced coffee — Vietnam
- Wiener Melange and Vienna coffee, after the city of Vienna, Austria

==== Coffee bean varieties ====
- Arabica coffee — Arabia
- Ethiopian Harar and Ethiopian Sidamo — Ethiopia
- Guadeloupe Bonifieur after the Caribbean island of Guadeloupe
- Jamaican Blue Mountain Coffee, from the Blue Mountains of Jamaica
- Kona coffee after the Kona District of Hawaii
- Liberian coffee — Liberia
- Maragogipe Coffee after the town of Maragogipe, Bahia, Brazil
- Mocha coffee bean after the port city of Mocha in Yemen
- Molokai coffee after the Hawaiian island of Molokai
- Monsooned Malabar after the Malabar Coast of southwest India

=== Drinking waters ===
- Acqua Panna after the village of Panna, Scarperia e San Piero, Tuscany, Italy
- Ambo Mineral Water after the town of Ambo, central Ethiopia
- Arrowhead Water after the rock formation in Arrowhead Springs, San Bernardino, California
- Bílinská kyselka after the city of Bílina, Czech Republic
- Bjni after the springs in Bjni, Armenia
- Borjomi from the Borjomi Gorge in the country of Georgia
- Deer Park Spring Water after the town of Deer Park, Maryland, USA
- Ein Gedi after the Ein Gedi oasis, Israel
- Evian after Évian-les-Bains, Haute-Savoie, France
- Fiji Water — Fiji
- Fuentealta after the springs of the same name in Teide National Park, Tenerife, Canary Islands
- Gerolsteiner Brunnen from Gerolstein in the Eifel mountains, western Germany
- Iceland Pure Spring Water and Icelandic Glacial — Iceland
- Jermuk (water) after the springs in the city of Jermuk, Armenia
- Londonderry Lithia after the town of Londonderry, New Hampshire, USA
- Malvern Water after the Malvern Hills, western England
- Mohai Agnes mineral water after the village of Moha, central Hungary
- Nabeglavi after the village of Nabeghlavi in the country of Georgia
- Ozarka after the Ozark Mountains, south central USA
- Panama Blue — Panama
- Pennine Spring after the Pennine Hills, northwest England
- Poland Spring after the town of Poland, Maine, USA
- Radenska after the town of Radenci, Slovenia
- Ramlösa after Ramlösa, a neighborhood of Helsingborg, southern Sweden
- Sairme after the town of Sairme in the country of Georgia
- San Pellegrino, after the town of San Pellegrino Terme, Lombardy, Italy
- Selters after the town of Selters, Hesse, Germany
- Seltzer water, a generic term for carbonated water named after Selters, Germany
- Shollar water after the village of Şollar, northern Azerbaijan
- Sierra Springs after the Sierra Nevada, California, USA
- Souroti water after the village of Souroti, near Thessaloniki, Greece
- Spa after the town of Spa, Liège, Belgium
- Tipperary Natural Mineral Water after County Tipperary, Ireland
- Vittel after the town of Vittel, Vosges, northeast France
- Volvic after the village of Volvic, Auvergne, France
- Whistler Water after Whistler, British Columbia, Canada
- Zephyrhills after the town of Zephyrhills, Florida, USA

=== Soft drinks ===
- Afri-Cola — Africa
- Auvergnat Cola after the Auvergne region, central France
- Baikal after Lake Baikal, Russia
- Blenheim Ginger Ale after Blenheim, South Carolina, USA
- Breizh Cola after Brittany (Breizh in Breton), western France
- Canada Dry — Canada
- Cavan Cola after the town of Cavan, Ireland
- Champagne cola, indirectly after the Champagne region of France
- Chicago Root Beer, a brand named after Chicago
- Clearly Canadian — Canada
- Cola Turka — Turkey
- Corsica Cola after the island of Corsica, France
- Cuba Cola, a Swedish soft drink named after the island nation of Cuba
- Delaware Punch via the Delaware grape after the city of Delaware, Ohio, USA
- Dublin Dr. Pepper, after Dublin, Texas, USA
- Guaraná Antarctica — Antarctica
- Inca Kola — Peru
- Italian soda — Italy
- Kola Escocesa, a Peruvian soft drink named after Scotland
- Kola Inglesa, a Peruvian soft drink named after England
- La Croix Sparkling Water after La Crosse, Wisconsin, USA
- Lemon & Paeroa — from mineral water springs at the New Zealand town of Paeroa
- Paso de los Toros after the city of Paso de los Toros, Uruguay
- Perú Cola — Peru
- Polo-Cockta — Poland
- San Pellegrino, after the town of San Pellegrino Terme, Lombardy, Italy
- Sussex Golden Ginger Ale after Sussex, New Brunswick, Canada

=== Teas ===
- Anji bai cha or Anji white tea, after Anji County, Zhejiang Province, China
- Assam tea, after the state of Assam, northeast India
- Berinag tea after the town of Berinag, Uttarakhand, India
- Ceylon tea — Ceylon, old name for Sri Lanka
- Chinese herb tea — China
- Darjeeling tea, after the city of Darjeeling, West Bengal, India
- Dianhong after Dian Lake in Yunnan province, southern China
- English breakfast tea — England
- Formosa oolong tea after a historical name of Taiwan
- Hong Kong-style milk tea — Hong Kong
- Huangshan Maofeng, after Huangshan, a mountain range in Anhui province, China
- Irish Breakfast tea — Ireland
- Junshan Yinzhen, from Junshan Island, Hunan province, China
- Kagoshima green tea from the Kagoshima Prefecture, Kyushu, Japan
- Kangra tea from the Kangra district, Himachal Pradesh, India
- Kashmiri tea, a.k.a. Noon Chai, from Kashmir
- Keemun, after Qimen County, Anhui province, China
- Korean tea - Korea
- Labrador tea after the Labrador region of eastern Canada
- London fog after the city of London, UK
- Longjing tea, after the village of Longjing, Hangzhou, Zhejiang, China
- Lu'an Melon Seed tea, after the city of Lu'an, Anhui province, China
- Maghrebi mint tea, after the Maghreb region of northwest Africa
- Mengding Ganlu tea after the Meng Mountain, Sichuan, China
- Nepali tea — Nepal
- Nilgiri tea after the Nilgiris District, Tamil Nadu, south India
- Pu-erh tea, after the city of Pu'er, southern Yunnan province, China
- Russian Caravan, a blend tea named after the tea trade through Russia
- Shanjuan Chunyue, after the Shanjuan Cave near Yixing, Jiangsu, China
- Söder tea after Södermalm, Stockholm, Sweden
- Thai tea — Thailand
- Tibetan tea, a fermented tea named after Tibet
- Turkish tea — Turkey
- Uji tea, from Uji, Kyoto Prefecture, Japan
- Vietnamese lotus tea — Vietnam
- Wuyi tea after the Wuyi Mountains of northern Fujian, China
- Xinyang Maojian tea, after the city of Xinyang, Henan province, China
- Yingdehong tea after the city of Yingde, Guangdong province, China

=== Other ===
- Capri Sun after the island of Capri, Campania, Italy
- Crodino after the town of Crodo, northern Piedmont, Italy
- Hawaiian Punch, after the Hawaiian Islands, USA
- Jumex after Mexico
- Nantucket Nectars after the island or town of Nantucket, Massachusetts, USA
- Tampico Beverages after the city of Tampico, Tamaulipas, Mexico

== Alcoholic beverages ==
=== Beers ===
==== Styles ====
- American lager, American Pale Ale and American wild ale — United States
- Baltic porter — the Baltic region
- Berliner Weisse, after the city of Berlin, in Germany
- California common beer — a.k.a. steam beer, after California
- Dortmunder, from the city of Dortmund, in Germany
- Flanders red ale after the historical region of Flanders, Belgium
- Gose after the town of Goslar, Lower Saxony, Germany
- Gotlandsdricka, an ale named after the island of Gotland, Sweden
- Grodziskie after the town of Grodzisk Wielkopolski, western Poland
- Gueuze after the Geuzen street in Brussels, Belgium
- India pale ale — India
- Kentucky common beer — Kentucky, USA
- Kölsch, from Cologne in Germany (Köln in German)
- Kottbusser after the town of Cottbus, Brandenburg, Germany
- Pilsner after the city of Pilsen (Czech: Plzeň) in the Czech Republic
- Scotch ale — Scotland
- Vienna lager — Vienna, Austria

==== Brands ====
- Achel, after the village of Achel, Belgian Limburg
- Alaskan Amber after the state of Alaska, USA
- Alhambra after the fortress complex of Alhambra, in Granada, Andalusia, Spain
- Amstel after the Amstel river in the Netherlands
- Andechser after the town and abbey of Andechs, southern Bavaria, Germany
- Angkor Beer and Angkor Extra Stout, after the historical city of Angkor, Cambodia
- Arequipeña after Arequipa, Peru
- Ballarat Bitter, after the city of Ballarat, Victoria (Australia)
- Bauskas, after the town of Bauska, Latvia
- Bavaria, a Dutch beer named after the state of Bavaria, Germany
- Belhaven Best after the town of Belhaven, Scotland
- Beerlao after the country of Laos
- Beijing Beer, after the city of Beijing, China
- Berliner Pilsner after the city of Berlin, Germany
- Bitburger after the city of Bitburg, Germany, near the border of Luxembourg
- La Binchoise after the town of Binche, Hainaut, Belgium
- Bohemia, a Mexican brand named after the historical Czech region of Bohemia
- Borsodi after the historical Borsod County, Hungary
- Bellevaux after the village of Bellevaux (Malmedy), Liège, Belgium
- Bourgogne des Flandres after Flanders, Belgium
- Brunehaut after the town of Brunehaut, Hainaut, Belgium
- Březňák after the village of Velké Březno, Czech Republic
- Brisbane Bitter after the city of Brisbane, Queensland, Australia
- Budweiser an American brand named after the city České Budějovice (Budweis in German) in the Czech Republic
- Budweiser Budvar produced in České Budějovice
- Burgasko after the city of Burgas, Bulgaria
- Castle Eden Ale, after the village of Castle Eden, County Durham, northern England
- Cēsu after the town of Cēsis, Latvia
- Chernihivske after the city of Chernihiv, northern Ukraine
- Chimay after the town of Chimay, Hainaut, Belgium
- Chiswick Bitter after the Chiswick district of London, England
- Chouffe after the village of Achouffe, Belgian Luxembourg
- Christianssands Bryggeri (CB) after the city of Kristiansand, south Norway
- Ciney after the town of Ciney, Namur, Belgium
- Creemore Springs after the village of Creemore, Ontario, Canada
- Cusqueña, after Cusco, Peru
- Devils Peak Ale after the Devil's Peak, near Cape Town, South Africa
- Dixie after the Dixie region of the United States
- Dommelsch after the village of Dommelen, North Brabant, Netherlands
- Dutch Gold, after the Netherlands
- Efes after the ancient Greek city of Ephesus (Turkish: Efes), western Turkey
- Einbecker after the town of Einbeck, Lower Saxony, Germany
- Erdinger after the town of Erding, Bavaria, Germany
- Estrella Galicia, after the Galicia region of Spain
- Faxe after the town of Faxe, Zealand, Denmark
- Flensburger after the town of Flensburg, Schleswig-Holstein, northern Germany
- Föroya Bjór after the Faroe Islands
- Galway Hooker after the city of Galway, Ireland
- Gösser after the town Göss, now a part of Leoben, Austria
- Grimbergen after the town of Grimbergen, Flemish Brabant, Belgium
- Grolsch after the city of Groenlo ("Grol" in 1615), Netherlands
- Gulpener after the village of Gulpen, Limburg, Netherlands
- Hanoi Beer after the city of Hanoi, northern Vietnam
- Harar Beer after the city of Harar, Ethiopia
- Harbin Beer after the city of Harbin, northeast China
- Hasseröder after the village of Hasserode, Saxony-Anhalt, Germany
- Helsingborgs after Helsingborg, Scania, southern Sweden
- Hengelo Bier after the city of Hengelo, Gelderland, Netherlands
- Hoegaarden after the village of Hoegaarden, Flemish Brabant, Belgium
- Huế Beer after city of Huế, central Vietnam
- Ichnusa after the ancient name of Sardinia, Italy
- Jenlain after the town of Jenlain, Nord, northern France
- Jever after the city of Jever, East Frisia, Germany
- Jupiler after the town of Jupille-sur-Meuse, Liège, Belgium
- Kalgoorlie Stout, after Kalgoorlie, Western Australia
- Kamenitza after the Kamenitsa Hill in Plovdiv, Bulgaria
- Karjala, a Finnish beer named after Karelia
- Karlovačko after the city of Karlovac, Croatia
- Kilkenny cream ale — originally produced in Kilkenny, Ireland
- Koblenzer after the city of Koblenz, Rhineland-Palatinate, Germany
- Kokanee after the Kokanee Glacier, British Columbia, Canada
- Korça after the city of Korçë, Albania
- Kotayk Beer after Kotayk Province, Armenia
- Köstritzer after the town of Bad Köstritz, Thuringia, Germany
- Krombacher after the town of Krombach, North Rhine-Westphalia, Germany
- Kronenbourg after the Cronenbourg neighborhood of Strassbourg, (once the town of Kronenburg), Alsace, France
- Kulmbacher after the town of Kulmbach, northern Bavaria, Germany
- Lapin Kulta after Finnish Lapland
- Laško Brewery after the town of Laško, Slovenia
- Ledenika after the Ledenika cave, Bulgaria
- Leżajsk after the town of Leżajsk, south-eastern Poland
- Licher from the town of Lich, Hesse, Germany
- Lübzer after the city of Lübz, Germany
- Łomż after the city of Łomża, north-eastern Poland
- London Pride, after London, England
- Lvivske after the city of Lviv, western Ukraine
- Mariestads after the city of Mariestad, Sweden
- Melbourne Bitter after the city of Melbourne, Australia
- Michelob, an American brand named after the village of Měcholupy (German: Michelob), Czech Republic
- Milwaukee's Best and Old Milwaukee after the city of Milwaukee, Wisconsin, USA
- Mosi Lager after the Victoria Falls (Mosi-oa-Tunya), Zambia
- Murree beer after the town of Murree, northeastern Pakistan
- Narragansett after the Narragansett Bay (or the Narragansett people), Rhode Island, USA
- National Bohemian an American brand named after the historical Czech region of Bohemia
- Newcastle Brown Ale, after the city Newcastle upon Tyne in England
- Nokian Panimo after the town of Nokia, southwest Finland
- Norrlands Guld after the Norrland region of Sweden
- Odense Pilsner and Odense Classic, after the city of Odense, Funen, Denmark
- Obolon after the Obolon district of Kyiv, Ukraine
- Oettinger from the resort town of Oettingen in Bayern, Germany
- Olympia Beer after the city of Olympia, Washington, Washington, USA
- Oud Beersel after the town of Beersel, Flemish Brabant, Belgium
- Paceña after the city if La Paz, Bolivia
- Pacífico, a Mexican beer named after the Pacific Ocean
- Parbo Bier after the city of Paramaribo, Suriname
- Phuket Beer after the island of Phuket, southern Thailand
- Pilsner Urquell after the city of Pilsen, Czech Republic
- Pirinsko Pivo after the Pirin Mountains, Bulgaria
- Quilmes after the city of Quilmes, Argentina
- Radeberger from the town of Radeberg, Saxony, Germany
- Rainier Beer after Mount Rainier, a volcano in Washington, USA
- Rheingold Beer after the river Rhine, western Europe
- Sagres after the town of Sagres, southwest Portugal
- Saigon Beer after the city of Saigon (now Ho Chi Minh City), southern Vietnam
- Saku after the town of Saku, Estonia
- Sapporo after the city of Sapporo, Hokkaido, Japan
- Sarajevsko pivo after the city of Sarajevo, Bosnia and Herzegovina
- Šariš after the town of Veľký Šariš, Slovakia
- Shangri-La Beer after Gyalthang, Yunnan, China, recently renamed Shangri-La City
- Shumensko after the city of Shumen, Bulgaria
- Sierra Nevada after the mountain range in California, USA
- Śląskie after the Silesia (Polish "Śląsk") region, mostly in Poland
- Soproni after the city of Sopron, western Hungary
- Spalter from the town of Spalt, Bavaria, Germany
- Starobrno after the city of Brno, Moravia, Czech Republic
- Strakonický Dudák after the Strakonice District, Czech Republic
- Taybeh Beer after the village of Taybeh, West Bank, Palestine
- Tecate after the city of Tecate, Baja California, Mexico
- Timișoreana after the city of Timișoara, western Romania
- Birra Tirana after the city of Tirana, Albania
- Topvar after the town of Topoľčany, Slovakia
- Trujillo after the city of Trujillo, northwestern Peru
- Trumer Pils after the town of Obertrum, Salzburg, Austria
- Tsingtao Beer after the city of Qingdao, Shandong province, China
- Tyskie after the city of Tychy, Silesia, Poland
- Utenos after the city of Utena, Lithuania
- Utica Club after the city of Utica, New York, USA
- Velebitsko after the Velebit mountains in Croatia
- Velkopopovický Kozel after the town of Velké Popovice, Czech Republic
- Victoria Bitter after the state of Victoria, Australia
- Viru after the Virumaa region, Estonia
- Waikato Draught after the Waikato region, North Island, New Zealand
- Warka after the town of Warka, central Poland
- Warsteiner from the town of Warstein, North Rhine-Westphalia, Germany
- Wernesgrüner from the village of Wernesgrün, Saxony, Germany
- Westmalle trappist after the village of Westmalle, Antwerp, Belgium
- Westvleteren after the town of Westvleteren, West Flanders, Belgium
- Windhoek after the city of Windhoek, capital of Namibia
- Wittinger from the town of Wittingen, Lower Saxony, Germany
- Wrexham Lager after the town of Wrexham, northeast Wales
- Xingu after the Xingu River in the Amazon rainforest, Brazil
- Yorkshire Bitter after the historic county of Yorkshire, northern England
- Zagorka after the city of Stara Zagora, Bulgaria
- Zaječarsko after the town of Zaječar, Serbia
- Zundert from the town of Zundert, North Brabant, Netherlands
- Żywiec after the town of Żywiec, southern Poland

=== Cocktails ===
- Alabama Slammer after the state of Alabama, USA
- Agua de Sevilla after the city of Seville, Andalusia, Spain
- Agua de Valencia after the city of Valencia, Spain
- Asiático — Asia (original name was "Ruso" or Russian)
- Bahama Mama after the Bahamas
- Blue Hawaii after the Hawaiian islands, USA
- Bronx after the borough of The Bronx, New York City, USA
- Brooklyn after the borough of Brooklyn, New York City, USA
- Cape Codder after Cape Cod, Massachusetts, USA
- Chicago Cocktail after the city of Chicago, USA
- Chimayó Cocktail after the town of Chimayo, New Mexico, USA
- Colombia after the country of Colombia
- Cuba Libre after the country of Cuba
- Curacao Punch after the Dutch Caribbean island of Curaçao
- Daiquiri after the beach and village of Daiquirí, southeast Cuba
- Harlem Mugger after the Harlem neighborhood of New York City, USA
- Irish car bomb, Irish coffee and Irish Flag after Ireland
- Japanese slipper after Japan, because of the Midori ingredient
- Liégeois after the city of Liège, Belgium
- Long Island Iced Tea after Long Island, New York State, USA
- Lorraine after the region of Lorraine, northeast France
- Lynchburg Lemonade after the city of Lynchburg, Tennessee, USA
- Manhattan after the borough of Manhattan, New York City, USA
- Missouri Mule after the state of Missouri, USA
- Mexican martini after Mexico, because of the tequila ingredient
- Moscow Mule after the city of Moscow, Russia
- New Englander after the region of New England, USA
- Pegu Club after the Pegu River, Burma
- Queens after the borough of Queens, New York City, USA
- Rüdesheimer Kaffee after the town of Rüdesheim am Rhein, Germany
- Black Russian, Blind Russian, Red Russian and White Russian — Russia
- Savoy Affair, Savoy Royale and Savoy Corpse Reviver after the Savoy in the western Alps
- Serena libre after the city of La Serena, Chile
- Singapore Sling after the city nation of Singapore
- Tahiti Drink after the island of Tahiti, French Polynesia, South Pacific
- Tortuga after the island of Tortuga, Haiti
- Yungueño after the Yungas forest in Peru

=== Distilled drinks ===
- Agwa de Bolivia, a herbal liqueur named after Bolivia
- Amaro Sibilla, after the Sibillini Mountains, Italy
- Andong soju, after the city of Andong, South Korea
- Angostura bitters, after the city of Angostura, Venezuela, now named Ciudad Bolívar
- Ararat, an Armenian brandy named after Mount Ararat
- Armagnac, a brandy from the Armagnac region in Gascony, southwest France
- Atholl Brose, a whisky based drink named after the historical region of Atholl, Scotland
- Bacanora, an agave-derived liqueur named after Bacanora, Sonora, Mexico
- Blue Curaçao, an orange liqueur named after the Caribbean island of Curaçao
- Bourbon whiskey, after Bourbon Street, New Orleans, or Bourbon County, Kentucky, USA
- Calvados, after the Calvados region in Normandy, France (named after the Calvados Rocks)
- Canadian whisky — Canada
- Cantueso, after the Province of Alicante, Spain
- Chambord (liqueur), after the town or château of Chambord, Loir-et-Cher, France
- Chartreuse, after the Chartreuse Mountains, southeastern France
- Chios Mastiha, after the island of Chios, Greece
- Cognac, a brandy named after Cognac in France
- Disaronno, an apricot liqueur named after the town of Saronno, Lombardy, Italy
- Domaine de Canton, after Canton province, China
- Dutch brandy and Dutch gin — the Netherlands
- Floc de Gascogne after Gascony, a region in southwest France
- Hierbas de Mallorca, a liqueur produced on Mallorca, Balearic Islands, Spain
- Irish cream, Irish Mist, Irish whiskey — Ireland
- Islay whisky, produced on the island of Islay, Scotland
- Koskenkorva Viina, after the village Koskenkorva in Ilmajoki, western Finland
- Lao-Lao, a rice whisky from Laos
- Lauterbacher Tropfen, after the borough of Lauterbach, Marienberg, Saxony, Germany
- Licor Beirão, after the historical province of Beira, Portugal
- Luzhou Laojiao, after the city of Luzhou, Sichuan, China
- Manx Spirit, produced on the Isle of Man in the Irish Sea
- Marpha brandy, after the village of Marpha in Nepal
- Mekhong, a Thai spirit named after the Mekong river
- Moonshine, privately produced liquor, named after the Moon or its light
- Moskovskaya vodka, a Russian brand named after Moscow
- Nassau Royale, after the city of Nassau, Bahamas
- Pisang Ambon, a banana liqueur named after Ambon, Maluku Islands, Indonesia
- Pisco, a brandy named after the coastal city of Pisco, Peru
- Plymouth Gin, after the city of Plymouth, Devon, southwest England
- Riga Black Balsam, after the city of Riga, Latvia
- Sassolino, an anise-flavored liqueur from Sassuolo, Modena, Italy
- Schierker Feuerstein, after the village of Schierke, Saxony-Anhalt, Germany
- Scotch whisky — Scotland
- Śliwowica łącka, a plum brandy named after Łącko, south Poland
- Steinhäger, a gin named after the village of Steinhagen, Westphalia, Germany
- Tennessee whiskey, after the state of Tennessee, USA
- Tequila, after the city of Tequila, Jalisco, Mexico
- Vana Tallinn, an Estonian liqueur named after the capital city Tallinn
- Yukon Jack, after the Yukon territory, Canada

==== Brands ====
- Angostura Rum, after the city of Angostura, Venezuela, now named Ciudad Bolívar
- Beenleigh Rum, after Beenleigh, Queensland, Australia
- Belaya Rus vodka, after the country of Belarus
- Bombay Sapphire, a gin named after the Star of Bombay and indirectly the city of Mumbai, India
- Bundaberg Rum, after the city of Bundaberg. Queensland, Australia
- Carúpano after the city of Carúpano, Venezuela
- Clontarf, an Irish whiskey named after (the battle of) Clontarf, Dublin
- Comber Whiskey, an Irish whiskey produced in Comber, Northern Ireland
- Corzo, a tequila named after Chiapa de Corzo, Chiapas, Mexico
- Cracovia, a vodka named after Kraków, Poland
- Dzama, a rum named after the city of Dzamandzar, Madagascar
- Finlandia, a vodka named after Finland
- Glenfiddich, a Scotch whisky named after the River Fiddich valley
- Havana Club, a rum named after the city of Havana, Cuba
- Khortytsia, a Ukrainian brand of vodka after island Khortytsia on the Dnieper river
- Konig's Westphalian Gin, a Steinhäger named after the Westphalia region of Germany
- Mackmyra Whisky, after the village Mackmyra near Valbo, Gästrikland, Sweden
- Malibu, a Barbados rum originating in Curaçao and presumably named after Malibu, California
- Midleton Very Rare, an Irish whiskey produced in Midleton, County Cork, Ireland
- Nemiroff, a Ukrainian brand of vodka after town Nemyriv in Ukraine
- Newfoundland Screech, a rum named after the province of Newfoundland, Canada
- Penderyn, a whisky produced in the village of Penderyn, Wales
- Russian Standard, a Russian brand of vodka
- Skåne Akvavit, a spiced vodka named after the province of Scania, Sweden
- Slyrs, a German whiskey named after the Schliersee, Bavaria
- Takamaka Rum, after the Takamaka Region of Mahé, Seychelles
- Tanduay, a rum named after the former island of Tanduay, Manila, Philippines
- Tullamore Dew, an Irish whiskey named after the town of Tullamore, Ireland
- Viru Valge, a vodka named after the Virumaa region, Estonia
- Zacapa Rum, after the town of Zacapa, Guatemala

=== Wines ===
==== Wine grapes ====
- Acitana after the city of Acireale (or nearby villages Aci Catena, Aci Castello, etc.), Catania, Sicily, Italy
- Arnsburger after Arnsburg Abbey, Hesse, Germany
- Aspiran after the Aspiran, Hérault, southern France
- Auxerrois blanc and Gros Auxerrois after the historical Auxerrois region around Auxerre, Burgundy, France
- Barbera Sarda after the island of Sardinia, Italy
- Bianchetta Trevigiana after the Province of Treviso, northern Italy
- Biancone di Portoferraio after the town of Portoferraio on Elba, Tuscany, Italy
- Blauer Portugieser after Portugal
- Blaufränkisch after the Franconia region of south-central Germany
- Bonarda Piemontese after the Piedmont region, northwestern Italy
- Busuioacă de Bohotin afgter the village of Bohotin, northeastern Romania
- Calabrese Montenuovo after the Calabria region in southern Italy
- Carignan after Cariñena, Aragon, Spain
- Catanese nero after the Province of Catania, Sicily, Italy
- Catawba after the Catawba River
- Chalosse Noire after the region of Chalosse, France
- Chardonnay after the town of Chardonnay, Saône-et-Loire, France
- Chasselas after the village of Chasselas, Saône-et-Loire, France
- Chenin blanc after Mont Chenin in Touraine, France
- Colombana nera after the Abbey of San Colombano in the town of Bobbio, Emilia-Romagna, Italy
- Cornalin d'Aoste after the Aosta Valley, northwestern Italy
- Cserszegi fűszeres after the village of Cserszegtomaj, western Hungary
- Ehrenfelser after Ehrenfels Castle (Hesse), Germany
- Freisamer after the city of Freiburg and the river Dreisam, Baden, Germany
- Frontenac after the town of Frontenac, Minnesota, USA
- Frühburgunder and Grauburgunder, after the historical territory of Burgundy, France
- Gamay after the village of the Gamay, south of Beaune, France
- Gewürztraminer after Gewürz ("herb, spice") and Tramin, South Tyrol, Italy
- Grasă de Cotnari after the village of Cotnari, Western Moldavia, Romania
- Grechetto and Greco, after Greece
- Green Hungarian — Hungary
- Helfensteiner after Helfenstein Castle, Württemberg, Germany
- Hondarrabi Zuri after the town of Hondarribia, Basque Country, Spain
- Hron after the Hron river, Slovakia
- Lagarino bianco after the Lagarina Valley in northern Italy
- Lagrein after the Lagarina Valley in northern Italy
- Limnio after the Aegean island of Lemnos, Greece
- Listán de Huelva after the province of Huelva, southwestern Spain
- Maceratino after the province and/or city of Macerata, Marche, Italy
- Madeleine Angevine; "Angevin" is the adjective of the county of Anjou and its capital Angers, France
- Madrasa after the village of Mədrəsə, Azerbaijan
- Malvasia after the Italian name for Monemvasia, Greece
- Marselan after the town of Marseillan, Hérault, France
- Mazuela after the town of Mazuela, Spain
- Melon de Bourgogne after the historical territory of Burgundy, France
- Montepulciano d'Abruzzo after the Abruzzo region of east-central Italy
- Mornen noir after the town of Mornant, east-central France
- Mourvèdre after Murviedro in Catalonia, Spain
- Müller-Thurgau, partially after the canton Thurgau, northeastern Switzerland
- Muscat d'Eisenstadt after the city of Eisenstadt, eastern Austria
- Muscat de Saumur after the city of Saumur, Pays de la Loire, France
- Muscat of Alexandria after the city of Alexandria, Egypt
- Muscat of Hamburg, aka Golden Hamburg and Black Hamburg after the city of Hamburg, Germany
- Nerello Mascalese after the town of Mascali, Sicily, Italy
- Nero d'Avola after the city of Avola, Sicily, Italy
- Orléans, a German grape named after the city of Orléans, north-central France
- Österreichisch-Weiß after the country of Austria
- Pascale di Cagliari after the city of Cagliari, Sardinia, Italy
- Pearl of Csaba after the city Békéscsaba, southeastern Hungary
- Persan after the hamlet of Princens near Saint-Jean-de-Maurienne, Savoie, France
- Petite Arvine, possibly after the Arve valley in Haute-Savoie, France
- Pineau d'Aunis after the historical province of Aunis, western France
- Prokupac after the city of Prokuplje, southern Serbia
- Prosecco bianco after the village of Prosecco, now a suburb of Trieste, Italy
- Reichensteiner after Reichenstein Castle, Rhineland-Palatinate, Germany
- Sémillon after the town of Saint-Émilion, Gironde, southwest France
- Siroka Melniska after the town of Melnik, southwestern Bulgaria
- Smederevka after the city of Smederevo, Serbia
- Spätburgunder, after the historical territory of Burgundy, France
- Traminer after the town of Tramin an der Weinstraße, South Tyrol, Italy
- Trevisana nera after the Province of Treviso, northeastern Italy
- Triomphe d'Alsace after the historical Alsace region west of the Rhine
- Trollinger after the County of Tyrol in the Alps
- Uva di Troia after the town of Troia, Apulia, Italy
- Uva Tosca, named after though not originated in Tuscany, Italy
- Verduzzo Trevigiano after the Province of Treviso, Veneto, Italy
- Vernaccia di Oristano after the Province of Oristano, Sardinia, Italy
- Vien de Nus after the town of Nus, Aosta Valley, northwest Italy
- Vitovska after the village of Vitovlje, western Slovenia
- Wildbacher, after the village of Wildbach, near the town of Deutschlandsberg, Styria, Austria

==== Wines from France ====
- Alsace after the Alsace region
- Anjou after the historical province of Anjou
- Banyuls after Banyuls-sur-Mer
- Beaujolais after the historical province of Beaujolais
- Bergerac after the town of Bergerac, Dordogne
- Bordeaux after the city of Bordeaux
- Bugey after the historical region of Bugey
- Burgundy after the Burgundy region
- Cahors after the city of Cahors
- Chablis after the city of Chablis
- Champagne after the historic province of Champagne
- Cheverny after the village of Cheverny
- Collioure after the town of Collioure
- Condrieu after the town of Condrieu
- Côtes de Toul after the town of Toul
- Madiran after the town of Madiran
- Pineau des Charentes after the department of Charente
- Saint-Pourçain after the town of Saint-Pourçain-sur-Sioule

==== Wines from Italy ====
- Aglianico del Vulture after the historical region of Vulture
- Albana di Romagna after the historical region of Romagna
- Alcamo after the town of Alcamo, Sicily
- Amarone after the town of Marano di Valpolicella, Veneto
- Asti after the city of Asti, Piedmont
- Barbaresco after the municipality of Barbaresco, Piedmont
- Barolo after the municipality of Barolo, Piedmont
- Brachetto d'Acqui after the city of Acqui Terme, Piedmont
- Brunello di Montalcino after the town of Montalcino, Tuscany
- Carmignano after the city of Carmignano, Tuscany
- Chianti after the Chianti Mountains, Tuscany
- Franciacorta after the territory of Franciacorta, Lombardy
- Gattinara after the municipality of Gattinara, Piedmont
- Gavi after the municipality of Gavi, Piedmont
- Marsala after the city of Marsala, Sicily
- Morellino di Scansano after the village of Scansano, Tuscany
- Moscato d'Asti after the city of Asti, Piedmont
- Nizza after the town of Nizza Monferrato, Asti, Piedmont
- Prosecco after Prosecco, now a suburb of Trieste
- Ramandolo after the village of the same name near Nimis, Udine
- Sagrantino di Montefalco after the town of Montefalco, Umbria
- Soave after the small city of Soave, Veneto
- Taurasi after the town of Taurasi, Campania
- Vernaccia di San Gimignano after the town of San Gimignano, Tuscany
- Vino Greco after Greece
- Vino Nobile di Montepulciano after the town of Montepulciano, Tuscany

==== Wines from Spain ====
- Amontillado, after the town of Montilla, Córdoba
- Campo de Borja, after the Campo de Borja district of Aragon
- Jumilla, after the town of Jumilla, Region of Murcia
- Penedès after the historical region of Penedès, Catalonia
- Priorat, after the county of Priorat, Catalonia
- Rías Baixas after the Rías Baixas estuarine inlets, Galicia
- Ribera del Duero, after the Douro river, Castile and León
- Rioja, after the province of La Rioja
- Rueda, after the village of Rueda, Valladolid, Castile and León
- Sherry, a fortified wine named after the city of Jerez de la Frontera, Andalusia
- Tierra de León, after the Province of León
- Toro, after the town of Toro, Zamora, Castile and León

==== Wines from elsewhere ====
- Bristol Cream a blend created in Bristol, South West England
- Carmel Winery after the Carmel mountain in Israel
- Hock, indirectly from Hochheim in Germany
- Madeira wine, a fortified wine, and Plum in madeira, a dessert — Madeira islands of Portugal
- Mosel, from the valley of the Moselle in Germany
- Piesporter, after the village of Piesport, in the Moselle valley, Rhineland-Palatinate, Germany
- Port wine (or Porto), sweet fortified wine — Porto, in northern Portugal
- Rheingau, after the Rheingau ("Rhine district"), Hesse, Germany
- Shiraz from Shiraz, Iran, unrelated to the Syrah or Shiraz grape
- Tokaji, after the town of Tokaj, northeastern Hungary

== See also ==
- List of foods named after places
- List of words derived from toponyms
