= Tokayer =

Tokayer may refer to one of several wines or wine grapes:

- Furmint, a white wine grape grown primarily in the Tokaj-Hegyalja region of Hungary
- Green Hungarian, a white wine grape sometimes referred to as Weisser Tokayer
- Pinot gris, known centuries ago as Tokay d'Alsace or Tokaji
- Tokaji, a white dessert wine originating in Hungary

It may also refer to people's names:

- Marvin Tokayer, a Hungarian-born American Rabbi who stayed in Japan in 1962-64 and 1967-76, a Japanophile
