= Viru =

Viru may refer to:

- Virumaa, a region and ancient county in Northern Estonia, now divided between:
  - Lääne-Viru County
  - Ida-Viru County
- Viru, Võru County, village in Rõuge Parish, Võru County, Estonia
- Viru, Iran, a village in Golestan Province, Iran
- Virú, a town in the La Libertad region of Peru
- Viru (beer), a brand of Estonian beer
- Viru Brewery, a former brewery in Estonia
- Viru Hotel, hotel in Tallinn, Estonia
- Viru Valley, a town and valley on the north coast of Peru, best known for its archaeological heritage
- Virender Sehwag (born 1978), Indian cricketer
- a character in the Persian/Parthian romance Vis o Ramin
- The Battle of Viru Harbor, a battle on New Georgia during World War II

== See also ==
- Veeru Dada, 1990 Indian film
- Veeru Devgan (1934–2019), Indian film actor and director
- Veeru Krishnan (1959–2019), Indian actor and dancer
- Veeru Potla, Indian film director and screenwriter
