= Shanjuan Chunyue =

Chinese green tea produced in Shanjuan Village(善卷村)

Shanjuan Chunyue (Chinese: 善卷春月; pinyin: Shànjuǎn Chūnyuè; lit. 'Spring moon of Shanjuan'; pronounced [ʂân.tɕɥɛ̀n ʈʂʰwə́n.ɥê]) is a Chinese green tea produced in Shanjian Village (善卷村), Yixing, Jiangsu province.

== Origin ==
Tea farmers in Shizuoka Prefecture in Japan had imported tea trees from China in 1890, altered it into Yabukita (薮北茶树). In 1990s, Chinese tea farmers in south of Yixing imported Yabukita, interbred it with Yangxian tea (阳羡茶) to produce Shanjuan Chunyue. Because it is based around the famous Shanjuan Cave and the tea leaves are shaped like a crescent moon, it was given the name "spring moon".

== Characters ==
The tea leaves are shaped like a crescent moon in dull green color.

== Production ==
There are six steps in production: Shaqing (杀青), using heat to stop enzyme; Cooling (摊凉); Forming (理条成形); Cooling resurgence (摊凉回潮); Drying (整形干燥) and Finishing (足干提香).

== See also ==
- List of Chinese teas
