= Hierbas =

Spanish liqueur

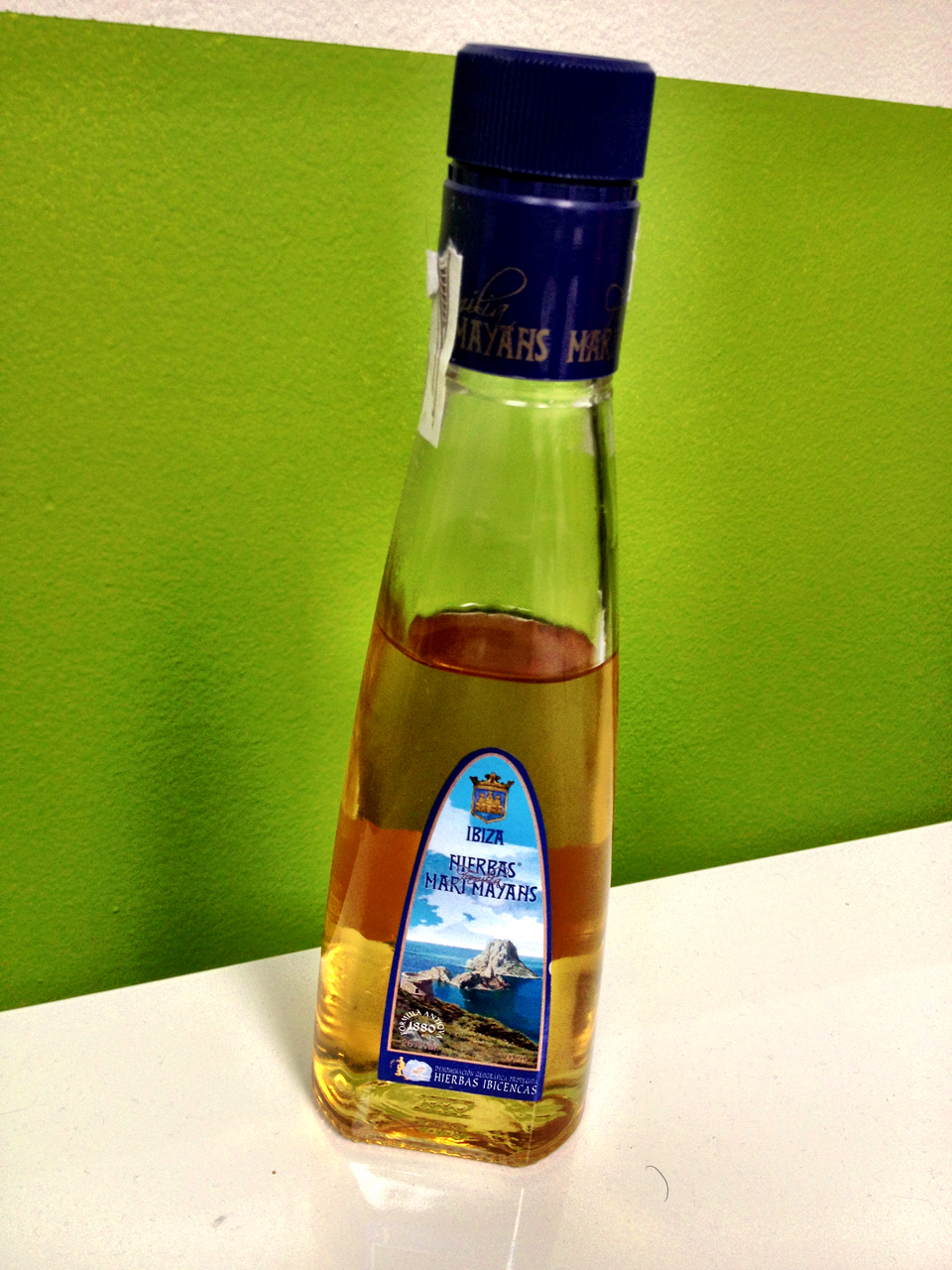
- Type: Digestif
- Origin: Balearic Islands, Spain
- Alcohol by volume: various
- Proof (US): various
- Color: Green/Amber

Hierbas is an aniseed-flavored Spanish liqueur served as a digestif.

The Hierbas de Mallorca are defined as an aniseed spirit obtained basically by extracting aromas from various plants of the island itself, for example: fennel, rosemary, lemon verbena, chamomile, lemon, orange and lemon balm.

The antecedents of herbs can be traced back to the monasteries, where the friars made a wide range of spirits and spirits from herbs and fruits.

== History ==
The Hierbas liqueur has its roots on the Balearic Islands. Monks already living there during the Middle Ages were already cultivating the wild herbs and alcohol for medicinal use, so a strong tradition existed for the production of the liqueur. However, it wasn't until the late 1800s that the actual production of Hierbas was formalized, utilizing techniques obtained from travellers to the mainland of Spain.

== Production ==
Hierbas is an aniseed-flavored liqueur made mainly by extracting aromas of various plants such as fennel, thyme, rosemary, Luisa herbs, lavender, rue, eucalyptus, chamomile, juniper berries, juniper, marjoram, mint, healthy grass, leaves and peels from lemons and oranges, and sage in the presence of other plants such as star anise and green anise or matafaluga.

== See also ==
- Herbs de Majorca, the Majorcan form
