= Hierbas de Mallorca =

Spanish herbal drink, Mallorcan herbal liquor

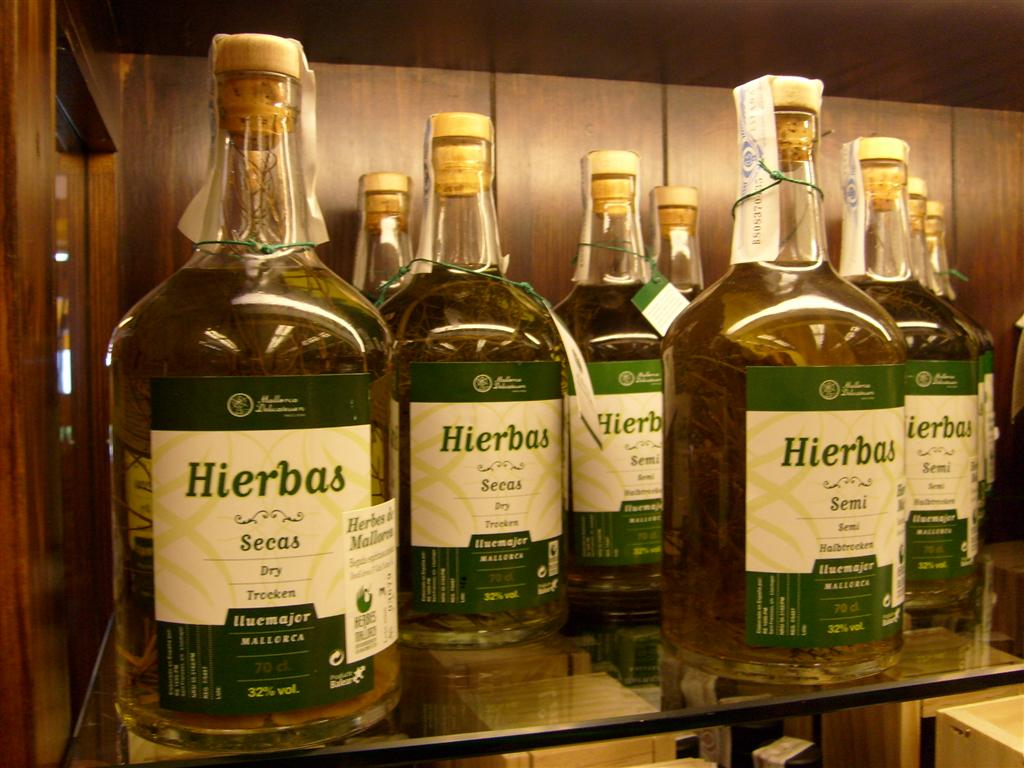
- Bottles from Llucmajor, labelled in Spanish, Hierbas and "32% vol." (Alcohol by volume)

Hierbas de Mallorca or Herbs de Majorca (Catalan: Herbes de Mallorca; Spanish: Hierbas Mallorquinas) is a Mallorcan herbal liqueur of medicinal origin. A form of the generic Hierbas, Hierbas de Mallorca has a protected designation of origin and can only be made in Mallorca.

== Origins ==
Hierbas de Mallorca has a medical origin. Produced in monasteries, it was used by pharmacists in the 16th century to fight diseases. Herbal liquor, distilled with several herbs, seeds, roots and flowers already being used for medical purposes, was recognised for its digestive effects and was used particularly to help stomach ailments. In the 18th century, an annual production of 780,000 litres was recorded in Mallorca.

== Composition ==
Hierbas de Mallorca is made from anise and other aromatic plants, which can include chamomile, fennel, lemon, lemon verbena, marjoram, mint, orange, and rosemary. There are three types: sweet, mixed and dry. The sweet and mixed types are made with more sugared anise and are at least 20% and 25% ABV respectively. The dry variant is at least 35% ABV. The liqueur can be green or amber.

Hierbas de Mallorca, which has a protected geographic denomination of origin, is produced exclusively on Mallorca. It is commercially produced but can also be made at home. Many Mallorcan families have their own recipes. Traditionally prepared in either spring or early autumn, the herbs and alcohol are combined in a large glass bottle and left for a minimum of three months before consumption.

== Serving ==
The liqueur is usually served after a meal as a digestif. It can be served over ice or pure in a chupito (a shot glass). Some bottles have a dried piece of a plant in them. Hierbas is a popular drink in the Balearic Islands and is consumed by both locals and tourists.
