= Beijing Beer =

Alcoholic beverage

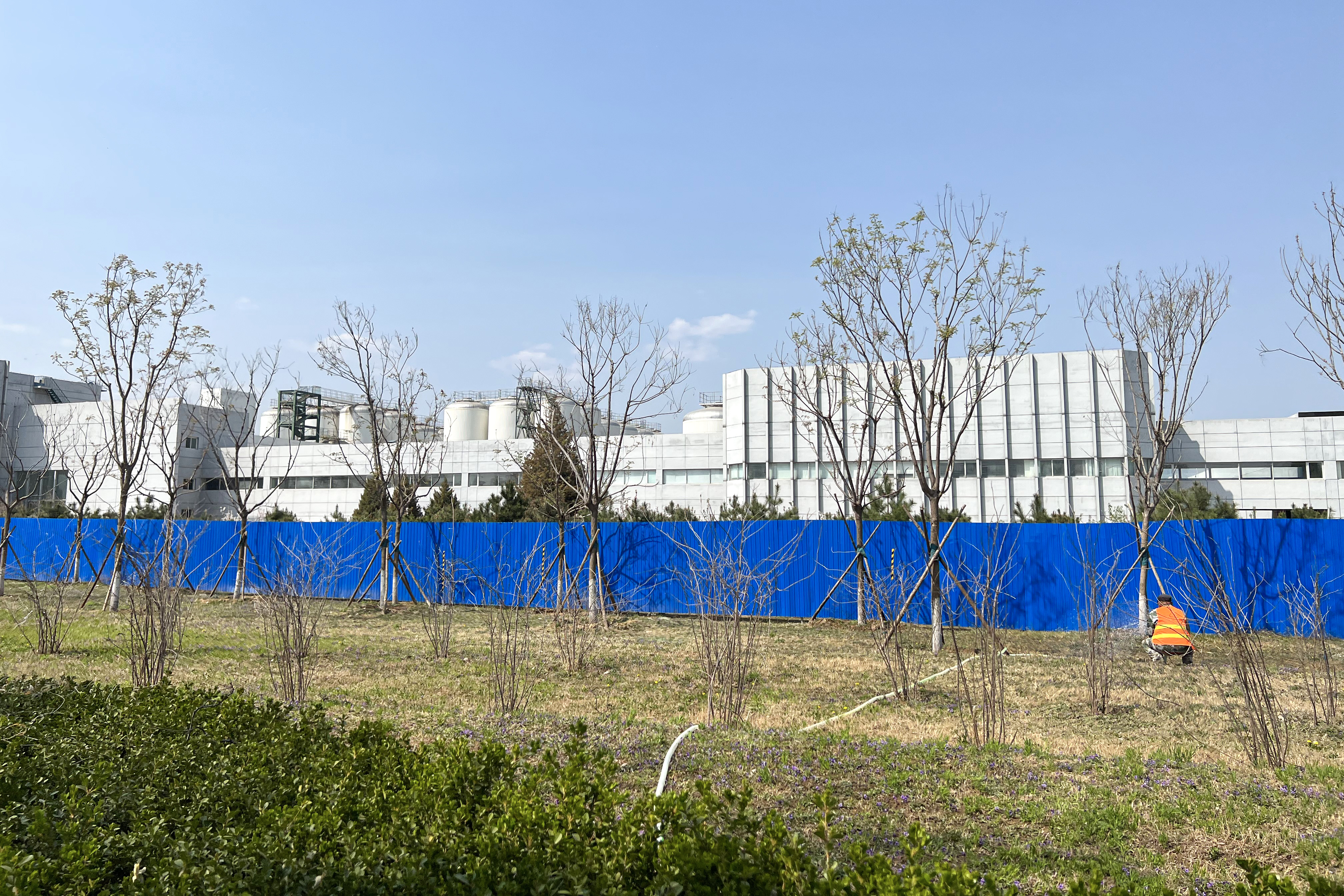
Outside view of a Beijing Beer production Facility.

Beijing Beer (Chinese: 北京啤酒; pinyin: Běijīng píjiǔ) is a locally produced alcoholic beverage for Beijing, China, by Asahi Breweries. The logo is a graphical representation of the Temple of Heaven with Beijing in Chinese characters (北京) written underneath in a joined up fashion. It is possible to purchase in most convenient stores, particularly 7-Eleven, supermarkets and restaurants although not as widespread as China's two most popular beers, Tsingtao Beer and Yanjing Beer. Draft beer is available in restaurants, while three different types are available in either 330-millilitre (11 US fl oz) cans or 600-millilitre (20 US fl oz) brown bottles for purchase.

== Different types of flavors ==
- "Light" - Green writing on a white can (9°)
- "Standard" - Blue writing on a silver can (10°)
- "Gold" - Black writing on a gold can (11°)

Translated restaurant menus can sometimes appear confusing because the "Yanjing" of Yanjing beer, is the old name for Beijing and is sometimes translated as such. So when ordering a "Beijing beer" a customer might not be receiving the Beijing beer produced by Asahi.
