= Brasserie Brunehaut =

Brewery in Rongy-Brunehaut, Belgium

Coordinates: 50.51°N 3.3876°E

Brasserie de Brunehaut
- Industry: Alcoholic beverage
- Founded: 1890
- Headquarters: Rongy-Brunehaut, Belgium
- Products: Beer
- Owner: Marc-Antoine De Mees

Brasserie de Brunehaut is the trade name for Brunehaut brewery, located in Rongy-Brunehaut (Hainaut), Wallonia, 80 km south/southwest of Brussels, Belgium, near the French border.

== History ==
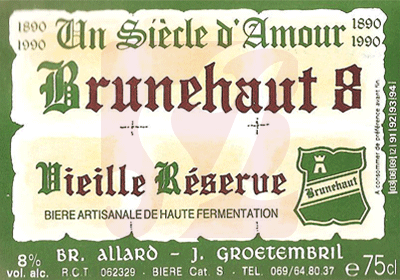
Brasserie de Bruenhaut marked "A Century of Love" in 1990, with Brunehaut 8, Old Reserve

The brewery's history dates directly to 1096 in Tournai, and a time of severe medieval famine, locally remembered as part of "the great plague". Beer was already known as a safe alternative to impure local water supplies and the local community needed help to avoid starvation. To promote public health, and compensate for minimal humanitarian support from Rome, Benedictine Bishop Radbod included brewing permissions in the charter to re-establish Abbaye de Saint-Martin.

Brewing thrived at Abbaye de Saint-Martin without significant interruption until 1793 when, during the French Revolution, most abbey structures, including the church sanctuary and brewery were destroyed. Only the mid-18th century Abbot palace, parts of the 14th century Gothic cloister and a Romanesque, 13th century crypt survived. Many important abbey documents, including Saint-Martin's "secret" brewing recipes, were successfully hidden from revolutionary plunder.

In 1890, during Belgium's post-Industrial Revolution prosperity, these recipes enabled resumption of Abbaye de Saint-Martin brewing by Brasserie de Bruenhaut. More than forty individual Brunehaut beers were brewed during the next century and, in 1990, output capacity doubled, via construction of a new, purpose-built fermentation house, two kilometers distance from the 1890 brewery site.

During February 2021, following two years of documentation, Brunehaut was certified as the first B Corp brewery in the European Union. Abbaye de Saint-Martin labels still remain among 18x Belgian beers to maintain official "Certified Belgian Abbaye Beer" status.

== Production, styles & labels ==
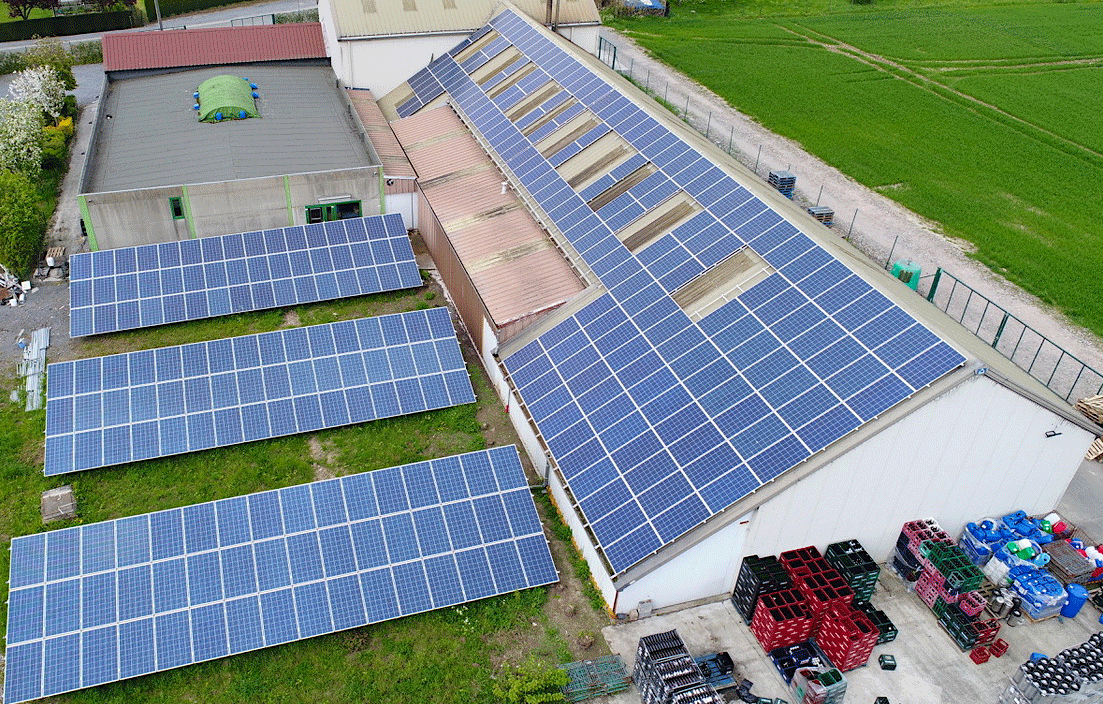
Brunehaut Rooftop Solar Arrays

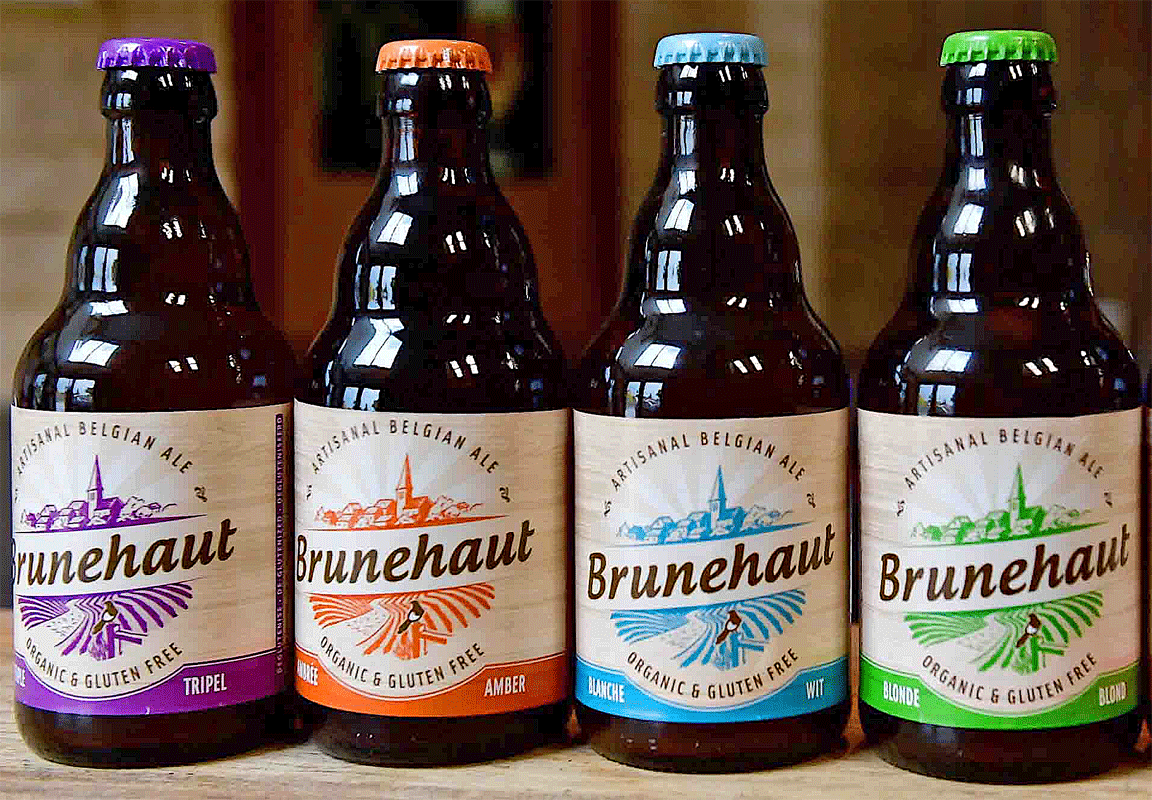
Brunehaut Gluten-Free, Organic Ale

An artisanal brewer, Brunehaut employs ancient Belgian brewing recipes, dating from the First Crusade and documented from 1096. Combining top (in-bottle) fermentation with modern production methods, brewmaster Damien Delneste's signature Brunehaut Gluten-free, organic beers have earned Belgian Certisys organic certification (BE-BIO-01). Certified at <5ppm gluten-free, and verified as kosher and vegan-friendly, the brewery grows their own barley and wheat within local terroir at Domaine de Graux. Consistent with these eco-conscious, organic brewing practices, beer production is powered by rooftop solar arrays.

=== Gluten-Free, organic style beers ===
- Brunehaut Gluten-free Bio Amber (bière ambrée) 6.5% ABV
- Brunehaut Gluten-free Bio Blonde (bière blonde) 6.5% ABV
- Brunehaut Gluten-free Bio Blanche (bière blanche) 5% ABV
- Brunehaut Gluten-free Bio Saison (bière Saison) 4.5% ABV
- Brunehaut Gluten-free Bio Triple (bière blonde) 7.5% ABV

A 2006 ownership change tightened the brewery's market focus and expanded export markets. Seven products were retired and new packaging labels commissioned. Brunehaut ships eleven labels across four continents, to more than twenty countries. Brewed as under 1000+-year-old Belgian brewing tradition, these beer styles feature Abbaye de Saint-Martin Dubbel and Tripel bottle-conditioned ales, both Certified Belgian Abbaye Beers.

=== Abbaye style beers ===
- Abbaye de Saint-Martin Blonde (organic bière blonde with triple hops) 7% ABV
- Abbaye de Saint-Martin Brune (organic bière brune/dubel) 8% ABV
- Abbaye de Saint-Martin Tripel (organic bière tripel) 9% ABV
- Abbaye de Saint-Martin Winter ale (organic bière hiver) 8.5% ABV

=== Regional style beers ===
- Abbaye de Saint Amand (juniper-spiced blond ale) 7% ABV
- Ne Kopstoot (ale), English translation = head butt 7% ABV

=== 21st Century discontinued labels ===
- Brunehaut Gluten-free Bio Pomfraiz' (bière pomfraiz) 5.5% ABV
- Mont Saint-Aubert (Bière de Garde) 8% ABV

== Awards ==
- Gold medal (for Speciality Beer) at the 2019 World Beer Awards.
- Gold medal (for Speciality Beer) at the 2017 World Beer Awards.
- Silver medal (for Speciality Beer) at the 2016 World Beer Awards.
- Best Belgian Beer of Wallonia for 2016.
- Abbaye de Saint-Martin Triple was awarded a Double Gold medal in the Ales category at the 2011 BIRA International Awards. Israel
- Brunehaut Gluten-free Bio Blonde won a gold medal in the Specialty Beer category at the 2011 BIRA International Awards. Israel
- Abbaye de Saint-Martin Blonde received a silver medal in the Belgian Strong Ale category at the 2011 Copa Cervezas America. Chile
- Brunehaut Gluten-free Bio Ambrée was a gold medal winner at the 2011 United States Open Beer Championships.
- Brunehaut Gluten-free Bio Blonde was a silver medal winner at the 2011 United States Open Beer Championships.
- Abbaye de Saint-Martin Triple earned a gold medal at the 2011 World Beer Championship.
- Abbaye de Saint-Martin Brune was awarded a silver medal at 2011 Beerfest Asia! Singapore
- Mont Saint Aubert Grand Reserve was runner-up in 2010 Philadelphia Beer Week judging.
- At the 2010 Australian International Beer Awards, Abbaye de Saint-Martin Brune and Triple each received Silver medals in the Abbey Style, Dubbel and Tripel category.
- During the 2009 World Beer Awards, Abbaye de Saint-Martin Brune was named World's Best Abbey (Dark) Beer while Mont Saint-Aubert received 'World's Best Bière de Garde" recognition. London
- In 2008, Mont Saint-Aubert and Abbaye de Saint-Martin Blonde were awarded Silver and Bronze medals (respectively) during the Australian International Beer Awards in the "Abbey Style, Dubbel and Tripel" category.
- Abbaye de Saint-Martin Blonde and Brune received Silver medals at the 2007 World Beer Championship.
- Brasserie de Brunehaut Organic White Beer earned a Silver medal at the 2007 World Beer Championship.

== Packaging, festivals and social media ==
Brunehaut Brewery ships bottled products in either "capped" 33cl or "corked" 75cl bottles across Europe, Asia, North and South America. Brunehaut draught beer is traditionally distributed in 20-liter kegs. In 2008 however, Brunehaut became the first European brewer to offer recyclable, lightweight 30-liter EcoKegs as an export alternative to negative environmental impacts of non-reused or un-recycled beer bottles.

Brasserie de Brunehaut is a member of Belgian Brewers, one of the world's oldest professional associations, and participates in many annual Belgian beer festivals including Zythos Bierfestival, Brussels Beer Weekend, Brugs Bierfestival, and Essen's Christmas Beer Festival.

Brunehaut Brewery engages publicly on multiple social media channels including Twitter and Facebook.

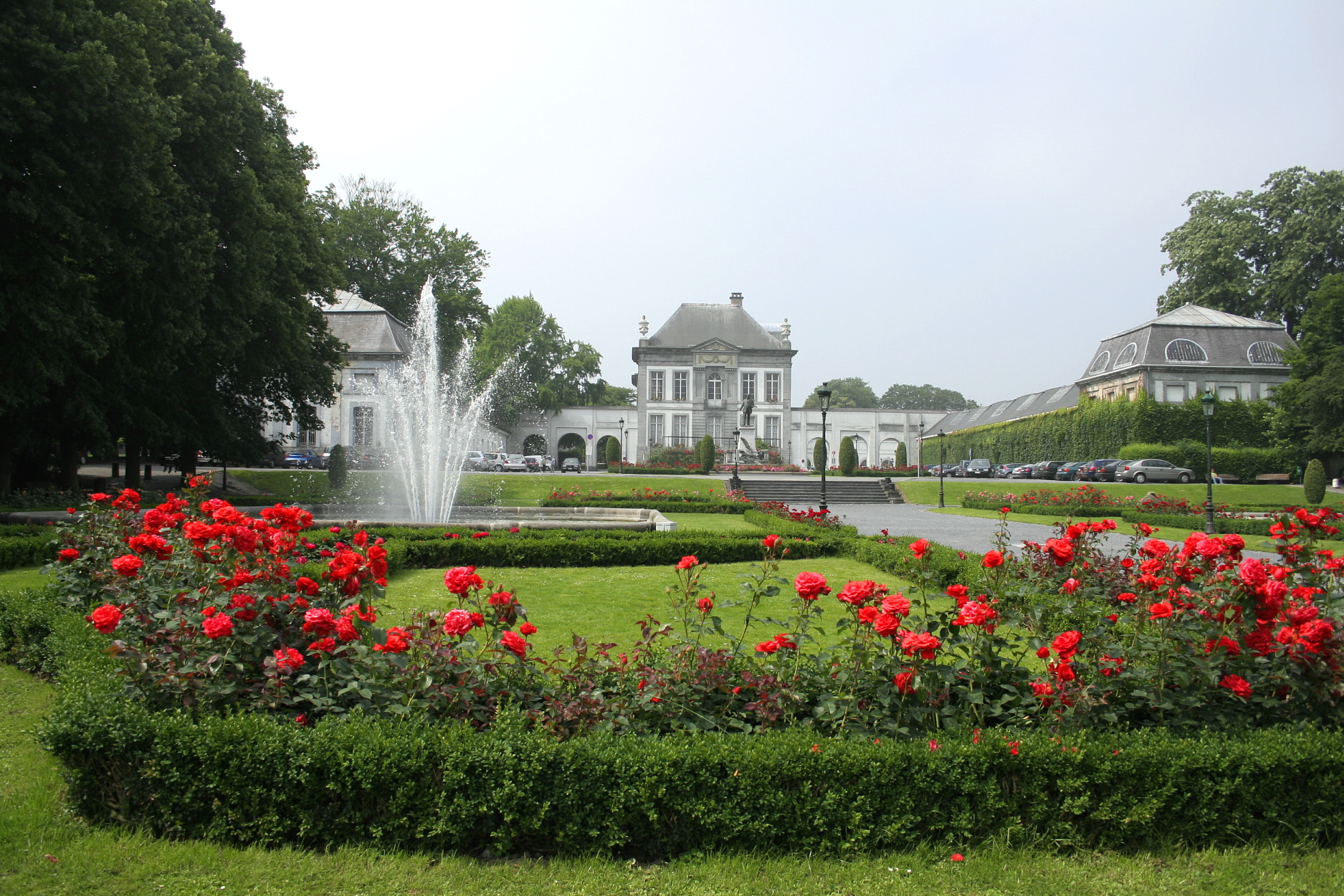
The old Abbot palace of the St. Martin abbey (1763), now Tournai town hall.

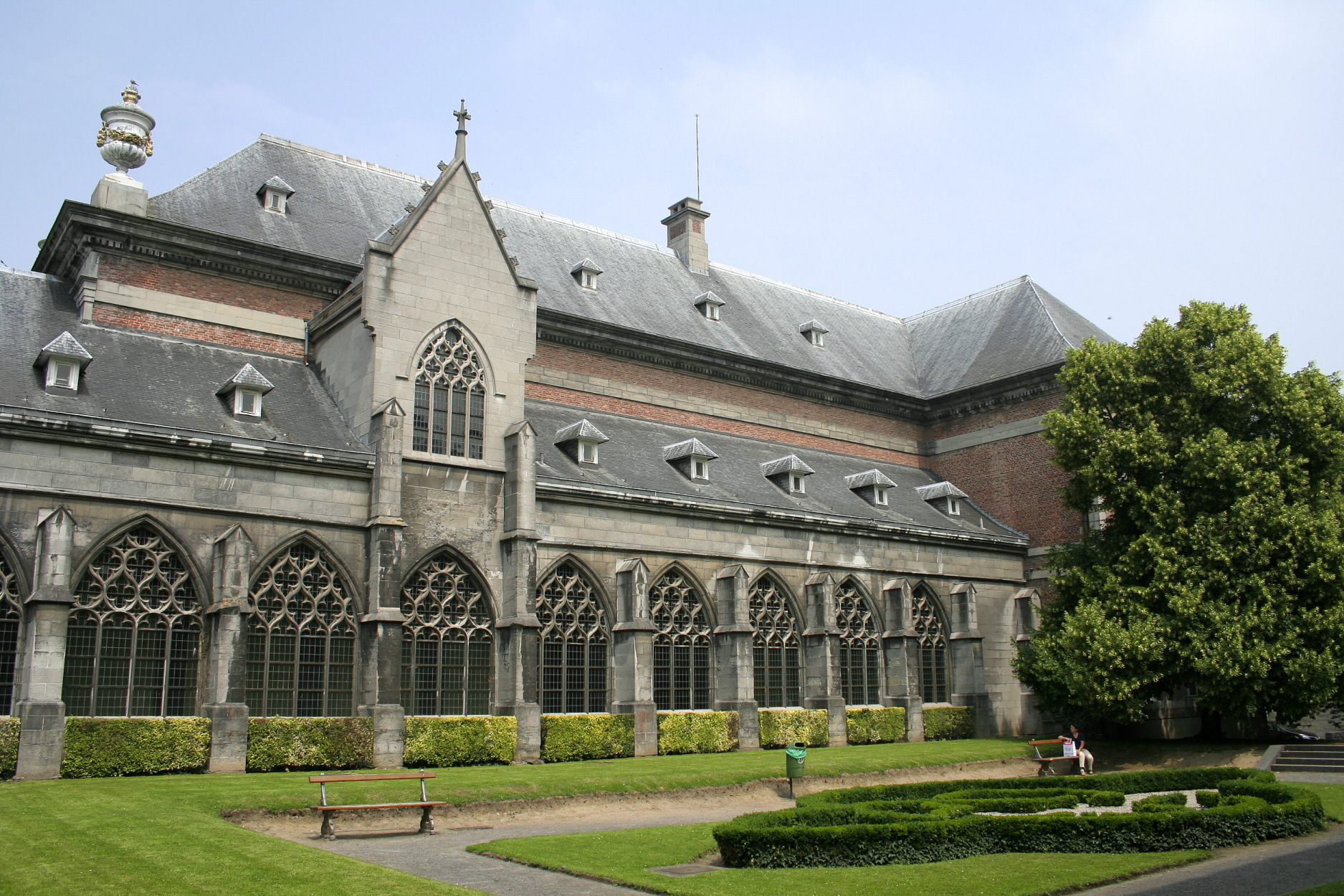
Abbaye de Saint-Martin Gothic Cloister

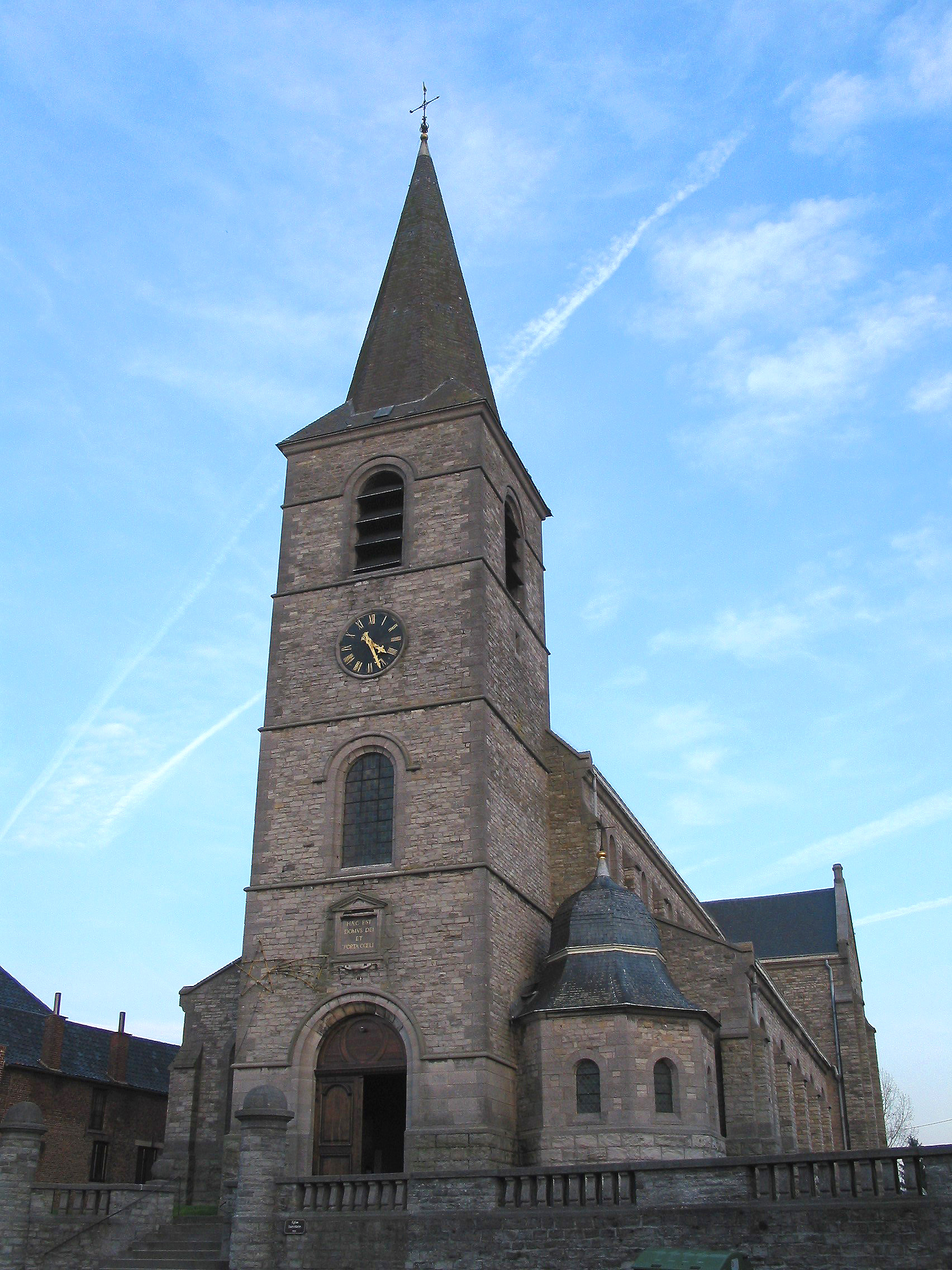
Eglise Saint-Martin (Rongy)
