= Strakonický Dudák =

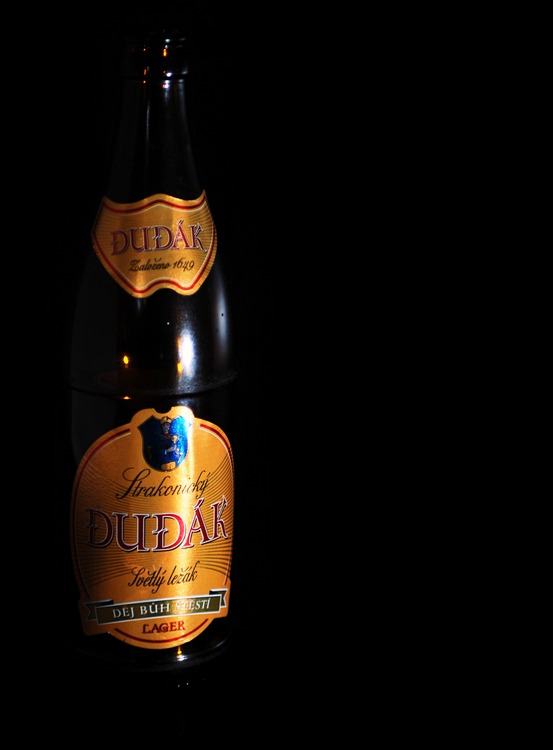
- Manufacturer: Pivovar Strakonice 1649, a.s.
- Origin: Czech Republic
- Introduced: 1649; 377 years ago
- Website: https://www.pivovar-strakonice.cz/

Strakonický Dudák is a brand of the Czech Republic's brewery Pivovar Strakonice 1649, a.s. Previously named Nektar, it is distributed in the Strakonice District as well as large Czech cities and e.g. Hungary. The name refers to the fictional bagpipe player who lived in the region, known from Josef Kajetán Tyl's play The Bagpiper of Strakonice.
