= Kola Escocesa =

Peruvian soft drink

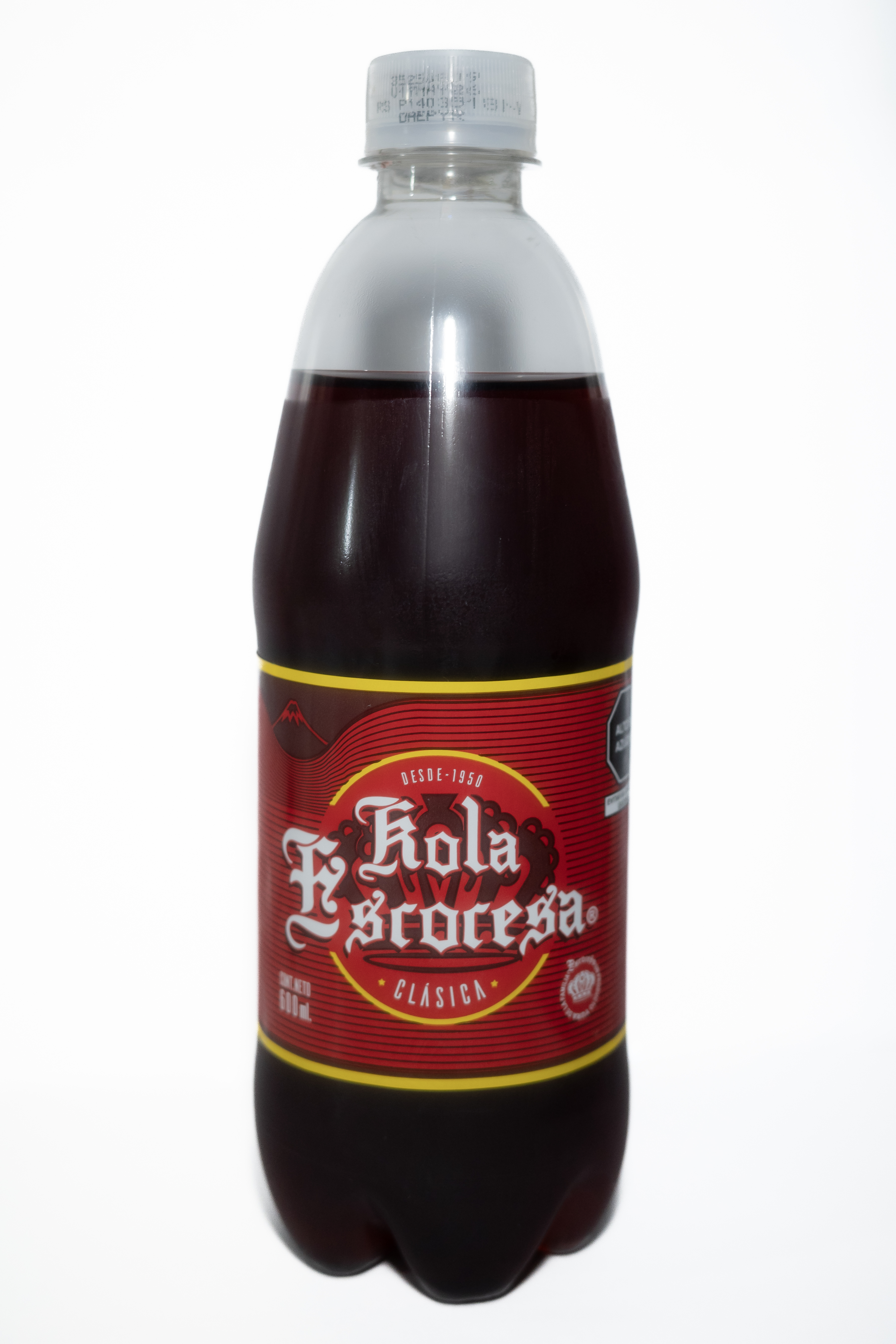
- Type: Soft drink
- Manufacturer: Empresa Yura S.R.L
- Origin: Peru
- Introduced: 1950
- Colour: Red
- Variants: Light
- Related products: Kola Inglesa

Kola Escocesa (English: Scottish Kola) is a Peruvian soft drink. It is a brand of the Empresa Yura S.R.L. company, located in town of Yura, not far from the city of Arequipa. It is recognized as one of the staple beverages of Arequipa, holding cultural significance to the city's residents. The beverage is primarily available in Arequipa and nearby regions, with very limited selection in locations outside of the city.

== History ==
The founder of Kola Escocesa was Armando Odiaga, a businessman who sold flavoring and fragrance products to bakeries and ice cream shops. Shortly after moving to Arequipa in 1948, he expressed interest in creating flavored beverages to Enrique Botas, the owner of a factory in Yura that made mineral water products supplied by a nearby spring. Odiaga then purchased the factory from Botas and his wife then made the suggestion of creating a soft drink similar to Fanta. Following this, Odiaga began to experiment with various flavors and ingredients to create a soft drink.

Using the company's mineral water sources, Kola Escocesa was introduced in August 1950 during festivities celebrating the anniversary of Arequipa's founding, with the beverage selling out quickly. For decades, affection for Kola Escocesa in Arequipa and its popularity eventually surpassed Peru's best-selling soft drink, Inca Kola, though its availability outside of the city is very limited.

== Production ==
Kola Escocesa is sold in PET bottles of 440ml, 600 ml, and 1.5 litres. Bottles come in both plastic and glass. Plastic is available in all sizes and the bottles take the former of a clear plastic bottle with a red label (see pictures). Glass bottles are a clear glass with writing directly on the bottle in a white color. Glass bottles are available in 600ml and 1.5L sizes. The soda can be hard to find outside of Arequipa.

The soda is also available in a light variant which has no sugar. Plastic bottles that are available in the light variant fade to white near the bottom of the red label. These bottles also have the word light on the label instead of clasica.

== Recognition ==
In 2024, Monde Selection awarded Kola Escocesa with a Gold Award for its quality.

== See also ==
- Empresa Yura
- Ginger Ale Aqp Dry
- Agua Mineral Yura
- Agua de Mesa Fontaine Bleu
