= Yingde =

Yingde 英德市
- County-level & Sub-prefectural city
- Yingde Shi
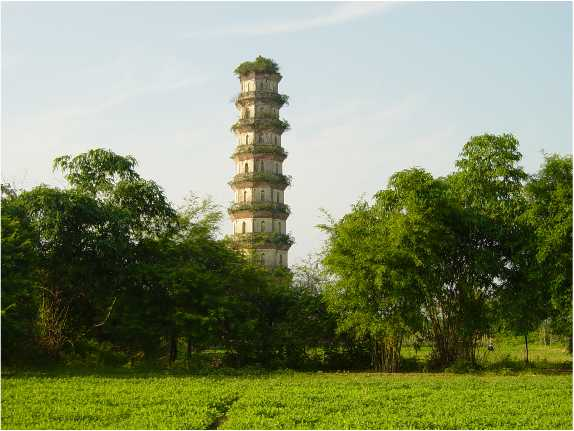

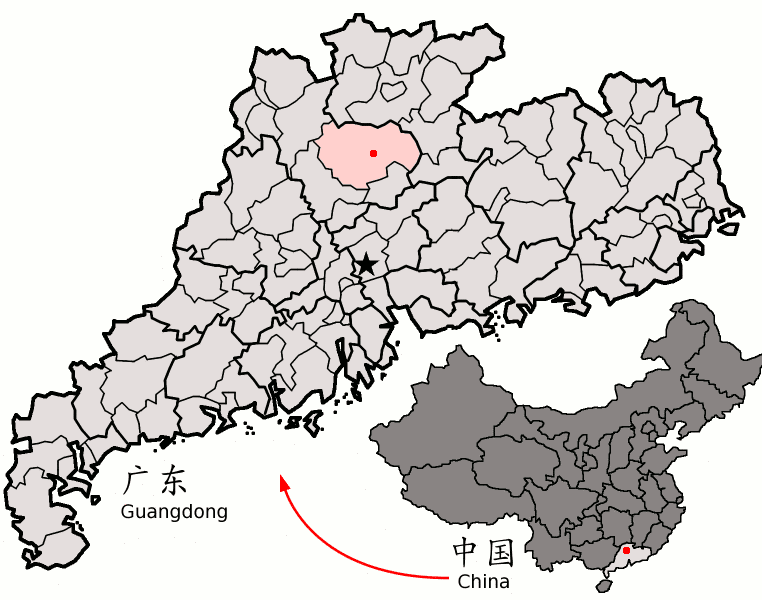

- Location of the city center in Guangdong
- Coordinates: 24°12′36″N 113°24′04″E
- Country: People's Republic of China
- Province: Guangdong
- Prefecture-level city: Qingyuan

Area
  - Total: 5,627 km^{2} (2,173 sq mi)
- Time zone: UTC+8 (China Standard)

Yingde
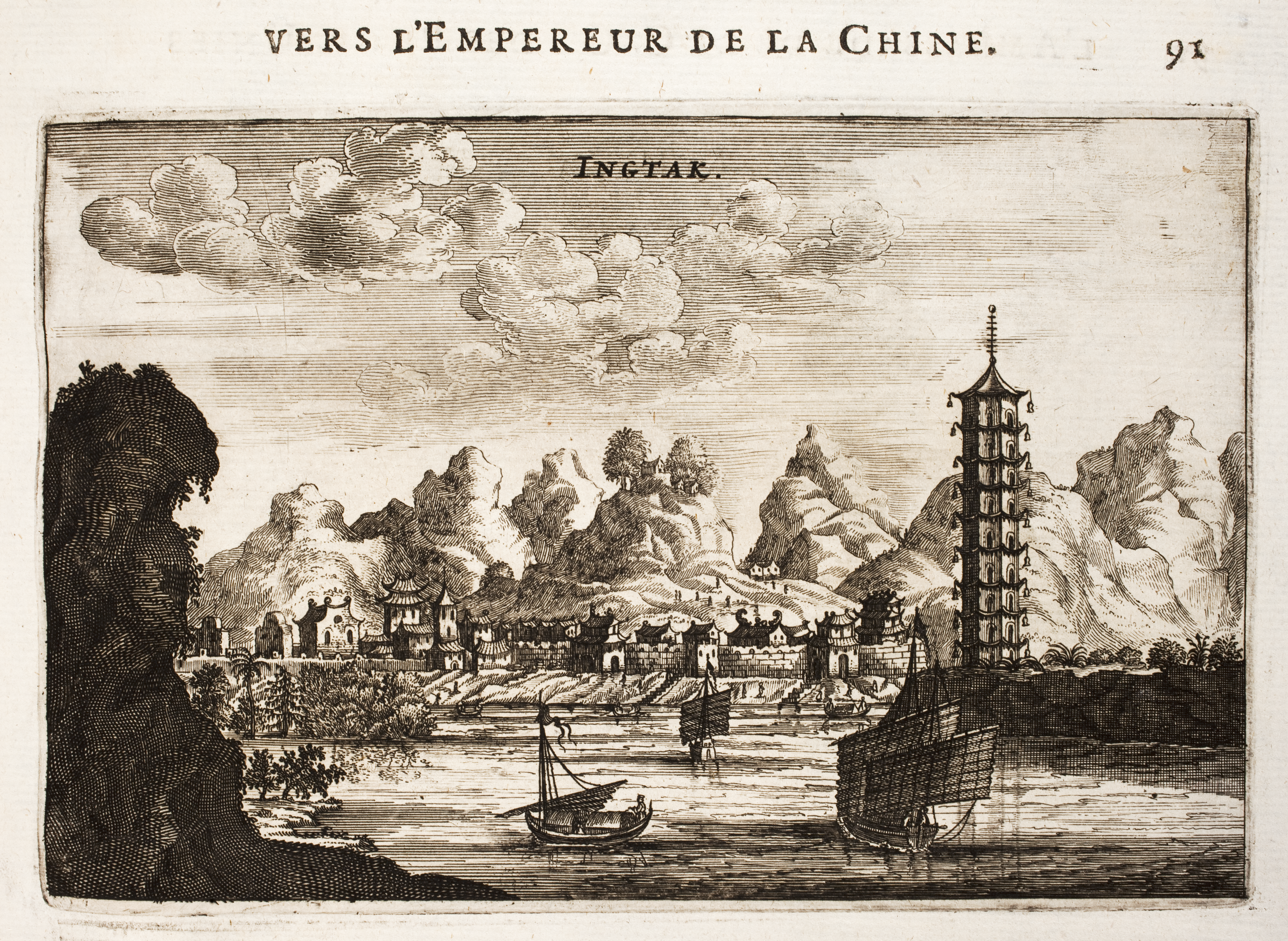
- Yingde ("Ingtak") as it appeared in Johan Nieuhof's account of the Dutch East India Company's 1650s embassy to the Chinese Empire
- Chinese: 英德
- Postal: Yingtak
- Literal meaning: Heroic Virtue
Transcriptions
Standard Mandarin
- Hanyu Pinyin: Yīngdé
- Wade–Giles: Ying-te

Yingde is a county-level city in Qingyuan Prefecture, Guangdong Province, China. It lies on the Bei or North River, which flows south to become one of the principal affluents of the Pearl River.

== Culture ==
The principal varieties of Chinese spoken are Hakka (64%), Cantonese (29%), and others (7%). Mandarin is rarely spoken except in teaching.

It is famous for its Yingde Stone and Yingdehong tea. In 1963, the British royal family popularized Yingde's black tea worldwide after offering the tea to guests at the Queen's Banquet. Yingde's tea history dates back to over 1,200 years ago. It is considered to be one of the top three places in the world to grow black tea.

== Climate ==
Climate data for Yingde, elevation 74 m (243 ft), (1991–2020 normals, extremes 1961–2010)
Month	Jan	Feb	Mar	Apr	May	Jun	Jul	Aug	Sep	Oct	Nov	Dec	Year
Record high °C (°F)	27.4 (81.3)	30.5 (86.9)	32.9 (91.2)	34.0 (93.2)	35.9 (96.6)	37.9 (100.2)	40.1 (104.2)	39.6 (103.3)	38.4 (101.1)	36.4 (97.5)	33.6 (92.5)	28.6 (83.5)	40.1 (104.2)
Mean daily maximum °C (°F)	16.1 (61.0)	18.0 (64.4)	20.3 (68.5)	25.4 (77.7)	29.6 (85.3)	32.0 (89.6)	33.8 (92.8)	33.8 (92.8)	31.9 (89.4)	28.5 (83.3)	23.8 (74.8)	18.4 (65.1)	26.0 (78.7)
Daily mean °C (°F)	11.8 (53.2)	13.9 (57.0)	16.6 (61.9)	21.6 (70.9)	25.4 (77.7)	27.7 (81.9)	29.1 (84.4)	28.9 (84.0)	27.2 (81.0)	23.6 (74.5)	18.7 (65.7)	13.5 (56.3)	21.5 (70.7)
Mean daily minimum °C (°F)	8.9 (48.0)	11.0 (51.8)	13.9 (57.0)	18.7 (65.7)	22.5 (72.5)	24.9 (76.8)	25.9 (78.6)	25.7 (78.3)	23.9 (75.0)	20.0 (68.0)	15.1 (59.2)	10.2 (50.4)	18.4 (65.1)
Record low °C (°F)	−3.6 (25.5)	1.2 (34.2)	1.0 (33.8)	7.3 (45.1)	13.6 (56.5)	17.5 (63.5)	21.2 (70.2)	22.5 (72.5)	15.4 (59.7)	9.1 (48.4)	3.5 (38.3)	−0.7 (30.7)	−3.6 (25.5)
Average precipitation mm (inches)	65.2 (2.57)	75.3 (2.96)	163.3 (6.43)	233.7 (9.20)	328.2 (12.92)	377.6 (14.87)	220.5 (8.68)	181.2 (7.13)	113.7 (4.48)	41.7 (1.64)	55.2 (2.17)	49.4 (1.94)	1,905 (74.99)
Average precipitation days (≥ 0.1 mm)	9.7	11.7	18.2	17.4	18.8	19.8	16.6	15.9	10.4	5.5	6.9	6.9	157.8
Average snowy days	0.2	0.1	0	0	0	0	0	0	0	0	0	0	0.3
Average relative humidity (%)	72	75	81	81	80	81	77	77	75	69	70	69	76
Mean monthly sunshine hours	107.6	83.2	67.8	83.7	125.3	152.6	218.6	213.9	201.6	201.9	168.3	150.9	1,775.4
Percentage possible sunshine	32	26	18	22	30	38	53	54	55	57	52	46	40
Source: China Meteorological Administration all-time extreme temperature
