= Asiático =

Alcoholic drink with a coffee base

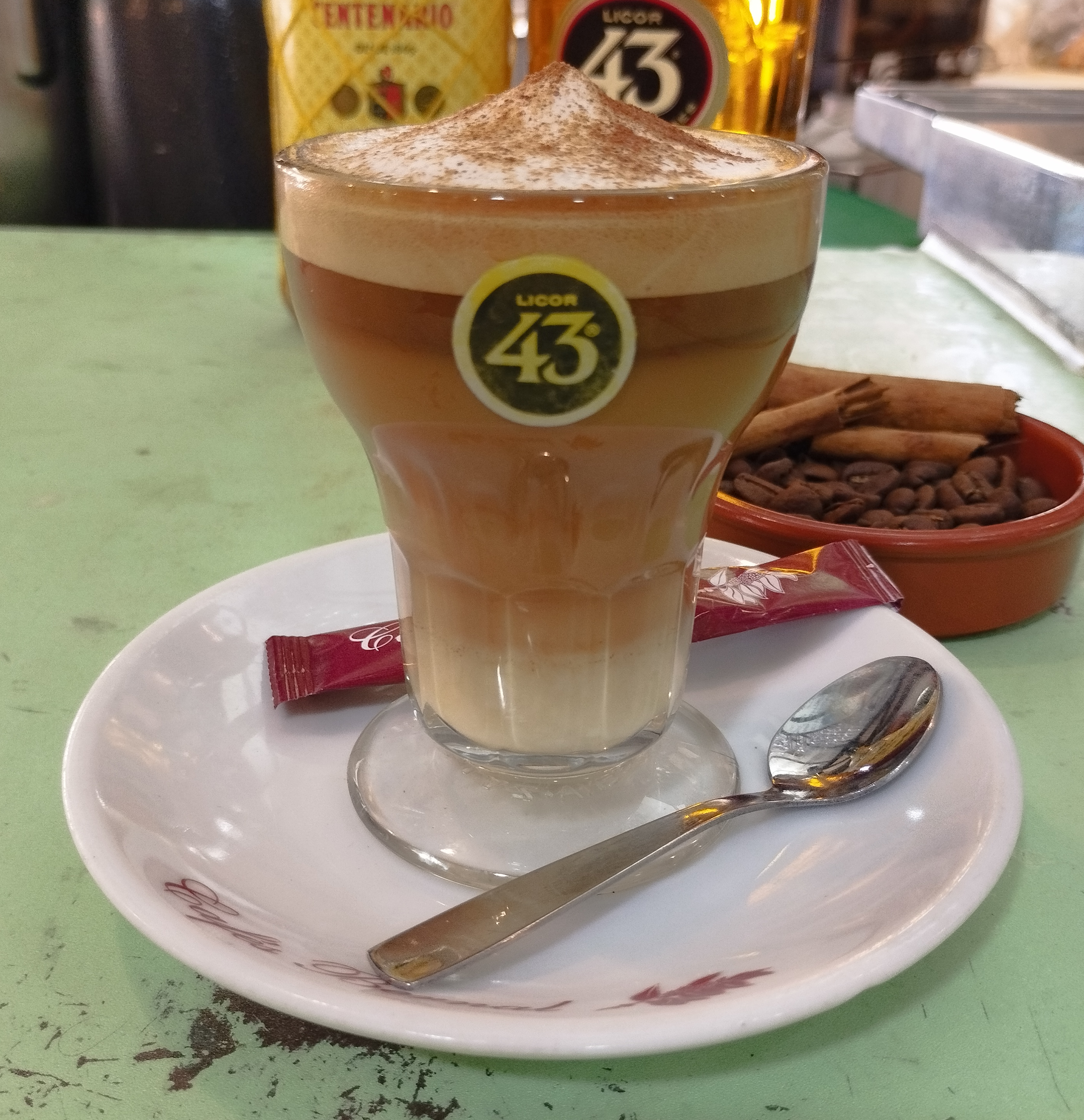
An asiático

Asiático is an alcoholic drink with a coffee base. It is typical of the Spanish city of Cartagena and particularly representative of the cuisine of the Campo de Cartagena.

== Recipe ==
The original recipe consists of coffee, condensed milk, and brandy, but it is common to find variations that also include a few drops of Licor 43, along with coffee beans, lemon peel, and a cinnamon stick. It is commonly served in a special glass, thicker than usual cocktail glasses to avoid thermal collapse, whose design is inspired by the one manufactured at the ancient Glass Factory of St. Lucia in Cartagena. This new glass replaced the vermouth glass that was originally used because of its greater resistance, and since 1945 the Jose Diaz company has been in charge of its manufacturing and commercialization.

== History ==
The origin of the recipe as we know it today dates back to the 1940s, when it was prepared by Pedro Conesa Ortega in his bar at Albujón in Cartagena, the "Pedrín" bar. Variations of the drink, however, already existed among the fishermen of Cartagena, who used to carry with them poor quality coffee (known as " recuelo"), brandy and milk, which helped them stay warm and alert. The drink was originally called "Ruso" (Russian), although its name was replaced by the currently-used "Asiático" (Asian), due to the original name's political connotations; at the time, the word was associated with the old Russia from the Soviet Union.

At present the Cartagena City Council seeks to promote the drink as a symbol of the city to entice tourists; information campaigns are conducted for this purpose within local businesses.
