= Chicago Root Beer =

American brand of root beer

- Type: Root Beer
- Manufacturer: Cool Mountain Beverages, Inc. (United States)
- Country of origin: United States
- Introduced: 1920

Chicago Root Beer is a brand of root beer primarily available in the United States.

Chicago Root Beer is a caffeine free beverage and is manufactured in Chicago with pure cane sugar and water from local Lake Michigan. The Chicago skyline appears on the bottle's label.

The rights to the Chicago Root Beer brand are owned by Cool Mountain Beverages, Inc. Chicago Root Beer is distributed both regionally and nationally through franchisees across the U.S.

Chicago Root Beer is available in 12 oz. glass bottles, 5 gallon bag 'n box syrups and kegs.

== Ingredients ==
Chicago Root Beer is considered an artisan or craft root beer, with ingredients that include pure cane sugar, caramel and wintergreen.
