= Dzama =

Rum produced by Groupe Vidzar

Dzama Rhum
- Type: Private
- Industry: Distilled beverages
- Founded: 1980
- Headquarters: Groupe Vidzar SARL; Immeuble Dzama Anosibe Angarangarana; BP 4403 – Tananarive; Madagascar
- Key people: Franck Fohine
- Products: Rum; Liqueur; Cocktails
- Website: www.dzamarums.com

Dzama (/ˈzɑːmə/) "Rhum" is the brand name for rums produced by Groupe Vidzar in Madagascar.

== History ==
Dzama Rhum was the idea of Lucien Fohine (half-Chinese, half-Malagasy) and his wife. They owned a grocery business and a scotch whiskey distribution company. After importing by the bottle, the Fohines took advantage of the economies of scale afforded by importing in barrels and bottling domestically. The resulting empty barrels found natural use in the aging of rum from the island of Nosy Be (off Madagascar's northwest coast) which he had found to bear the particular terroir influence of its volcanic soil and the surrounding plantations of aromatic plants such as vanilla, Ylang-Ylang, citrus, clove, pepper, wild pepper, and others. The minerals of this soil and the essential oils from the plants he knew to produce a rum that was impossible to duplicate naturally elsewhere.

A variety of rum products were quickly added. Production was transferred to Antananarivo (the capital) when the success of the rums and the cost of transportation made it imperative by 1984.

The company that started out with two station wagons and two light trucks now has 60 vehicles that cover the whole island of Madagascar. Dzama dominates 60% of the spirits market on the island. The population is 22 million.

In 1996, upon the early death of Lucien Fohine, his son Franck (17 years old) took over the reins of the company, and continues to this day in the tradition and methods of his father, while applying his own knowledge from an extensive education in viticulture, oenology, and distillation in Marseille and Montpelier, France. Franck Fohine introduced white rums and cocktails that turned out to be very popular with women buyers. He also introduced quick ageing in new barrels for certain products to help retain the original qualities of the rums, while insisting in continuing the tradition of creating products that are free of any artificial ingredients.

Up until the 2000s, the rum did not have a good reputation on the island. Since then, the distillery started to create finer rums for exportation purposes, but in 2019 finer rums accounted for only 5% of its 50 million bottles/year production. The brand was launched in the USA in 2012.

== Etymology ==
The name "Dzama" is derived from the city of Dzamandzar, where the base rum is produced, and is a reference to the local colloquialism for trust between friends. The name Vidzar is derived from a combination of letters in French for "Old Rum of Dzamandzar."

== Rums produced and methods used ==
Barrels come mainly from the Chivas Brothers Distillery in Scotland, old American oak barrels that were previously used for Sherry or Bourbon production. Used and new Limousin oak barrels are also employed in the aging of the higher-end rums.

Their Classique Cuvee Blanch is a white rum designed for sipping. It undergoes a very short stay in the used Scotch barrels that are first washed with a citrus solution. The remaining fresh acidity adds dimension to the other terroir-derived influences of cloves, vanilla, and others.

This Classique Cuvee Blanche and its companion, the Cuvee Noire, are still bottled by hand. The Prestige and Nosy-Be lines are bottled in separate modern facilities.

A five-part filtration system is used to ensure water purity: a sand filter to remove impurities and solids; Carbon to remove odors; Cathanion to remove chemicals; Cartouche for minerals; and Ultraviolet to kill germs.

Quality Control: All possible sanitary precautions are taken to ensure a pure, untainted product. Masks, gowns, headgear, shoe covers, and disinfectant basins are used by all who enter the bottling plants. Walls are painted twice a year to prevent the development of mold and mildew. Employee hands are inspected.

Special yeasts are used in the distillation of each rum to ensure ideal fits between— the rums derived from sugar cane of different regions with different aromatic plant influences, and the blending to occur at later dates. This care in the selection and matching of batches is what differentiates the Dzama Rums from all others in the market. Dzama Rums are terroir-specific products.

Dzama makes 1-, 3-, 6- and 10-year old rums. Some rums are flavored with vanilla bean pods.

== Selected brands and varieties ==
- Classique Cuvée Blanche – Aged 2 to 4 weeks
- Classique Cuvée Noire
- Cuvee Blanche Prestige – Aged 4 months
- Cuvee Noire Prestige – Aged 3 years
- Blanc de Nosy Be Prestige – Aged 3 years
- Ambre de Nosy Be Prestige – Aged 4 years
- Dzama Vanille 1-year
- Dzama Vanille 6-years
- Dzama Vanille 10-year
- Dzama 15-years
- Dzama 25-year
- Dzama Millesime 1987

== Bibliography ==
- The World Book Encyclopedia/Madagascar/Vanilla. Willard, Ohio: RR Donelley. ISBN 978-0-7166-0113-5

== Awards ==
- Bronze Medal, 2014 Third International Rum Conference, Madrid (Prestige Cuvée Noire)
- Bronze Medal, 2014 Third International Rum Conference, Madrid (Classique Cuvée Noire)
- Bronze Medal, 2014 Third International Rum Conference, Madrid (vintage 1998)
- Bronze Medal, 2014 Third International Rum Conference, Madrid (Vanilla Rum)
- Gold Medal, 2013 Paris Rum Fair (Cuvee Noire Prestige)
- Gold Medal, 2013 German Rum Festival, Berlin (Ambre de Nosy Be)
- Gold Medal, 2012 The Spirits Business – London Rum Masters (vintage 1998)
- Gold Medal, 2012 The Spirits Business – London Rum Masters (Ambre de Nosy Be)
- Gold Medal, 2012 WSWA Tasting Competition (Blanc de Nosy Be)
- Gold Medal, 2012 Miami Rum Renaissance Festival (10 Year Old Dzama Vanilla)
- Silver Medal, 2012 Miami Rum Renaissance Festival (Classique Cuvee Noire)
- Silver Medal, 2012 The Spirits Business – London Rum Masters (Prestige Cuvee Noire)
- Silver Medal, 2012 WSWA Tasting Competition (Prestige Cuvee Noire)
- Bronze Medal, 2012 Miami Rum Renaissance Festival (Blanc de Nosy Be)
- Gold Medal, 2011 Miami Rum Renaissance Festival (Dzama Rhum Vanilla 1 year)
- Gold Medal, 2011 Miami Rum Renaissance Festival (Ambre de Nosy Be)
- Gold Medal, 2011 Miami Rum Renaissance Festival (Prestige Cuvee Noire)
- Silver Medal, 2011 Miami Rum Renaissance Festival (Dzama Rhum Vanilla 3 year)
- Silver Medal, 2011 Miami Rum Renaissance Festival (Blanc de Nosy Be)
- Silver Medal, 2011 Miami Rum Renaissance Festival (Dzama Vieux Rhum 6 year)
- Bronze Medal, 2011 Miami Rum Renaissance Festival (Prestige Cuvee Blanche)
- Bronze Medal, 2010 International Wine and Spirit Competition (Dzama Rum Vanilla 3-year)
