= Kagoshima green tea =

Tea cultivated in the Kagoshima Prefecture of Japan

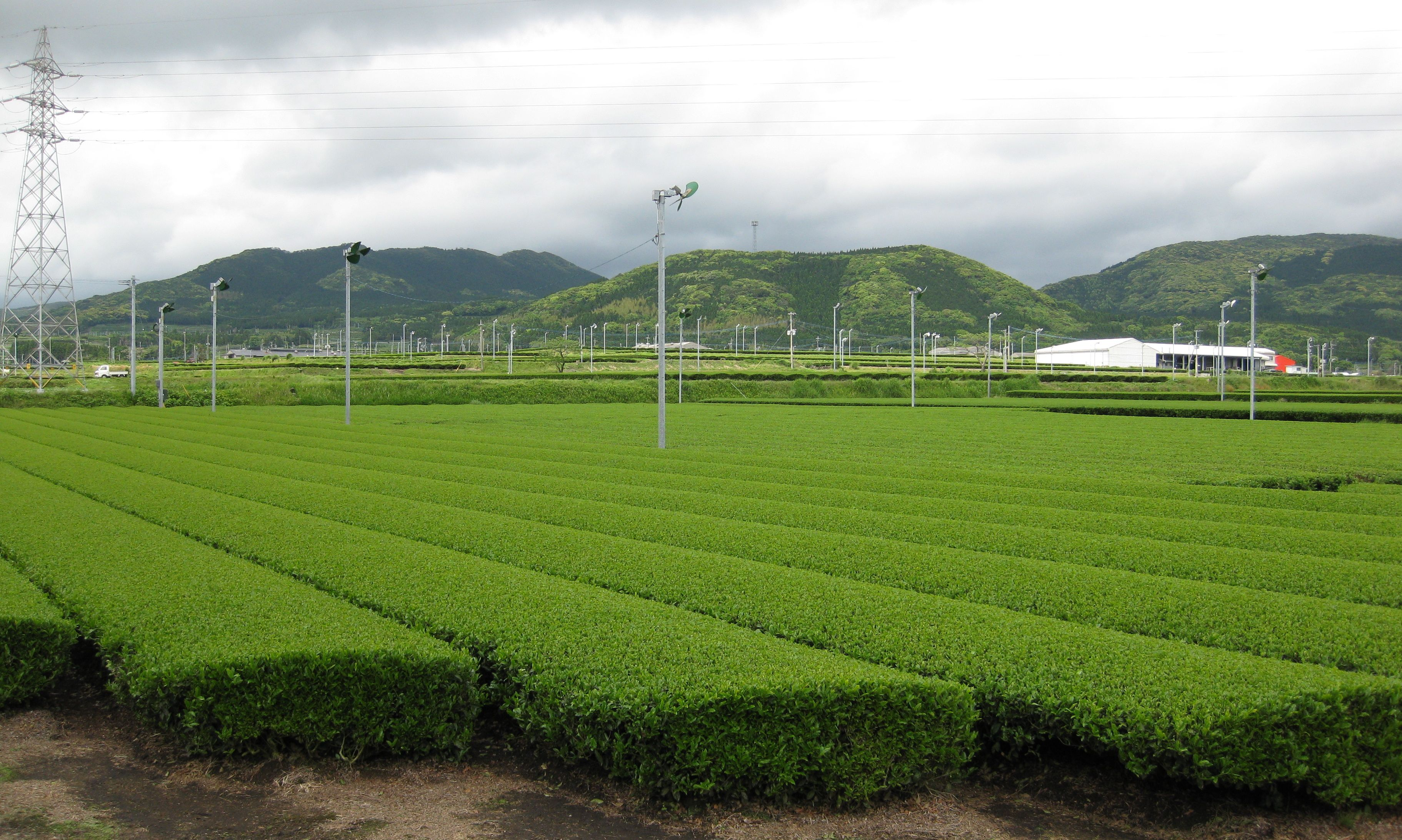
A tea plantation on the Nansatsu Plateau

Kagoshima green tea is grown in Kagoshima Prefecture which, together with Shizuoka Prefecture, accounts for roughly 70% of all dried unrefined tea in Japan. Kagoshima green tea is known for its shaded first flush harvests which are one of the earliest harvests of the year. This tea is called shincha. Second harvests while often used for green tea are now being used for black tea production as well. Later third and fourth flushes are often blended and used in tea bottles that are sold in stores and vending machines. The name Kagoshima green tea has been used since about 1992.

== Production ==
The largest cultivation area of tea which is around the Nansatsu plateau ranging from Minami-Kyushu to Makurazaki. Other important cultivation areas include the prefectures second and third largest production regions Shibushi and Kirishima as well as the surrounding regions on the Ōsumi Peninsula.

Due to Kagoshima being further south than Japan's other tea growing regions, it allows the prefecture to produce more cultivars of tea which may not be suitable further north. While Yabukita (the most common cultivar of tea in Japan) still makes up 30% of Kagoshima's tea fields, this number is much less than other tea growing regions in Japan. Two other cultivars that are prevalent in Kagoshima include Yutakamidori and Saemidori. Yutakamidori is an early budding tea plant with his resistance to disease and a slightly better taste than Yabukita, but is susceptible to frost damage. Saemidori is also an early budding tea plant praised for its color and high amino acid content, but its yield can be affected by damage to the plant.

== History ==
The chief priest from Uji started growing tea at temple in Yoshimatsu, Kagoshima.(1319 – 1320) This is the first time to grow tea in Kagoshima.

In the Edo period (1603 – 1867), Satsuma clan encouraged tea cultivation so many people started growing tea at each place in Satsuma Province. At that time, the northern part of Kagoshima, from Akune to Yoshimatsu, was the center of tea plantations. Tea was mainly grown at ridges between rice fields and hedges.

While opening up the country, the cultivation for export became active and many tea plantations were cultivated. In the 19th century, production of inferior tea had been increasing so in 1887, an association of tea in Kagoshima was established for improvement in quality. From around the 1870s to 1950s, tea growers also tried to grow tea leaves for English tea but it did not take off.

Around 1975, production become full scale. But because name recognition of Kagoshima Green Tea was originally low, it was unacceptable to the market and it was all made for blends. Around 1985, the sales strategy as a regional brand was strengthened.
