= Sairme (brand) =

Naturally carbonated mineral water brand

Sairme საირმე
- Type: Mineral water
- Manufacturer: Sairme Mineral Waters
- Origin: Georgia (Sairme)
- Introduced: 1945; 81 years ago
- Website: Sairme.ge

Sairme (Georgian: საირმე /sa'eer-meh/) is a brand of naturally carbonated mineral water from springs of Sairme balneological resort area in Imereti region.

The sources of water are located 55 kilometres (34 mi) from Kutaisi in the territory of Baghdati municipality, in the Tsablarastsqali river gorge (the left feeder of the Khanistsqali) on the northern slope of the Meskheti Range. Sairme is at an elevation of 915 metres (3,002 ft) in a gorge cut by the Tsablaristskali River. Summers are moderately warm with an average July temperature of 17 °C and winters are mild with an average January temperature of –1 °C. Precipitation totals 940 mm (37.01 in) annually. Sairme mineral water is used for drinking and bottling. There is a sanatorium in Sairme.

== History ==
The first mention of the waters Sairme was found in the sources of the 1890s. According to popular legends among the people, two brothers - the hunters who were pursuing the trail of a wounded deer found water Sairme. Water flowed over the stones red with oxide and all around it was white with salt. Deer often came here for salt and water. They called the water Sairme because of their number (the origin of the name comes from the Georgian word ირემი, which in translation means "deer").

Shepherds also paid attention to this area because of the amazing events. They noticed that in a place that was at a distance of about 3 km from the source of deer, grass was steady green, the snows never lie, and the earth was already dry in a few minutes after the rain. The veil of mystery of a magic glade was filmed in the 20th century when geologists discovered hot mineral water in the land.

The first attempt of a scientific study of water Sairme is associated with the name of Doctor Kelenjeradze from Baghdati. In 1912 while still a student, he took a sample for analysis to St. Petersburg. The first chemical analysis of mineral water was held by professors of Petersburg Military Academy. They were vividly interested with a sample sent from the possession of Eristavi in Petersburg. In subsequent years Latvian scientist Roberts Kupcis studied the mineral waters in Sairme. On the orders of Emperor Nicholas II he studied mineral waters of the Caucasus, particularly Georgia.

Local oral history suggests that the road through the Bostania river gorge was cut through the rock "by hand" without explosives or heavy machinery by German Army prisoners of war.

=== Bottling and production ===
The use of Sairme water began in 1893. Mineral water was mainly poured predominantly in the barn, where it was brought by horses. For the first time they began to pour the water on the factory rules in 1945. In 1954 the construction of the plant was completed. Since that time 400,000 untreated water in liter bottles were released. Later the plant was equipped with a water production system, which changed little by little and become more modernized.

During the collapse of the Soviet Union and the introduction of socialist system the work of the plant was stopped.

Since 1998, after the privatization, they began a modernization of the plant and care for the return of the popularity and their consumers; the interior and facade of the building was updated.

Since 2010 there have been significant changes in the factory Sairme: a complete re-inventory was made; a mineral water bottling mechanism has changed; the plant was equipped with automated manufacturing facilities and computer technology. The laboratory was completely renovated and water quality is regularly tested there, the process of casting a bottle is also strictly controlled.

== Sources of Sairme ==
Sairme flows in several streams/water well in the resort and nearby territories. They differ from one another in their chemical composition and healing properties.

Currently two types of water are bottled:·

- Sparkling mineral medical-table water "Sairme" - (glass-0.5 L 0.3 L; PET- 0.5 L, l L, 2 L)·
- Natural drinking non-carbonated (still) water "Springs of Sairme" - (glass -0.5 L; PET- 0.5 L, 1,5 L)

The water is rich in calcium bicarbonate, which strengthens the skeletal system and helps to stop the inflammatory process. Carbonated mineral water is used for restoring the function of the liver, urinary tract, kidney and gastrointestinal tract. It promotes the breakdown of harmful substances formed as a result of metabolism.

Sairme Springs – (not carbonated) is used in medical procedures as well as in cosmetology.

== Water features ==
The massive deposits of tufa are located in the field which creates the basis for anticline Sairme. Water mineralization changes from 1.6 g/L (≃ 1.6 oz/cu ft) (borehole in Namarniskhevi at a distance of 400 m (1,312 ft) from the central sources) to 9.5 g/L (≃ 9.5 oz/cu ft) (borehole #4). The output of the spring is variable. This source is also the basis for the operation of the resort Sairme for prophylaxis and a wide range of diseases treatment purposes.
