= Chicago cocktail =

Brandy-based mixed drink

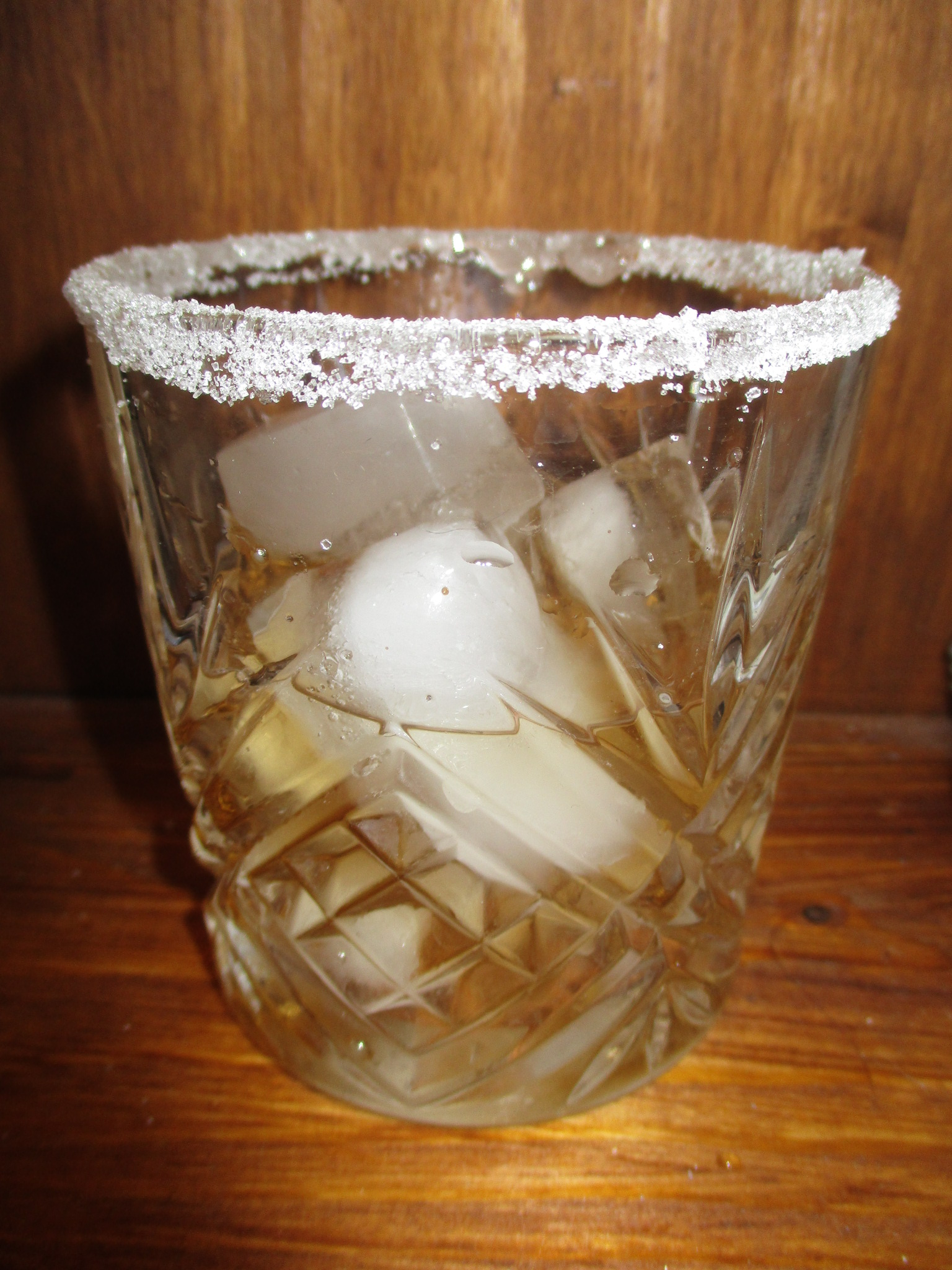
- Type: Cocktail
- Ingredients: Brandy; Triple sec; Bitters; Champagne (optional)
- Standard drinkware: Old fashioned glass
- Standard garnish: Lemon slice
- Served: On the rocks: poured over ice
- Preparation: Shake or stir with ice.

The Chicago cocktail is a brandy-based mixed drink probably named for the city of Chicago, Illinois. It has been documented in numerous cocktail manuals dating back to the 19th century. Chicago restaurant critic John Drury included it in his 1931 guide Dining in Chicago, noting that it had been served at the American Bar in Nice and the Embassy Club in London. Whether it originated in Chicago is unknown.

Recipes call for brandy; orange-flavored liqueur, such as curacao or triple sec; and bitters, stirred or shaken with ice, which may or may not be strained out afterward. In many versions of the drink, it is topped off with champagne or white wine. Some versions call for sugaring the rim of the glass. It can be served on the rocks in a double old-fashioned glass or, especially in the champagne variation, straight up in a champagne coupe or flute or a cocktail glass.
