= Rancho de Chimayó Restaurante =

Restaurant in Chimayó, New Mexico, United States

Coordinates: 35.9943°N 105.9305°W

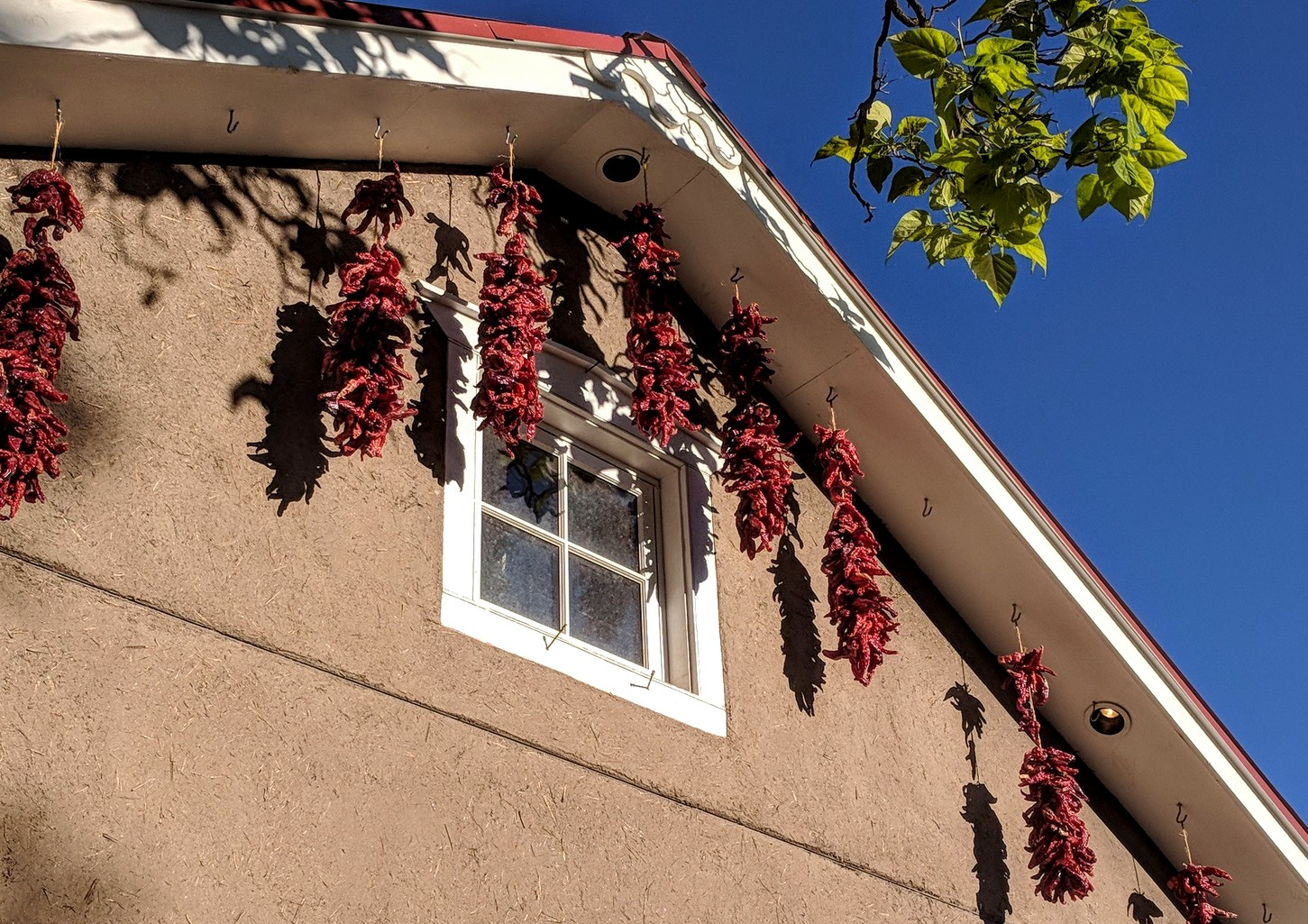
Chile ristras decorating Rancho de Chimayó Restaurante

Rancho de Chimayó Restaurante is a James Beard Foundation Award American Classic (2016) in Chimayó, New Mexico. Owned by Florence Jaramillo, she opened the restaurant with her husband Arturo. Their food has been described as a “no-frills take on New Mexican cooking, with its obvious influences from Mexican and Native American cultures.” Their “signature dish” is the carne adovada.

In 1985, the Jaramillos were named “Restaurateur of the Year” by the National Restaurant Association.

Opened in 1965, they were named one of New Mexico’s Culinary Treasures in March 2014.

When the Jaramillos opened the restaurant, they thought they would be able to capitalize on the increasing popularity of the nearby Santuario, since there were no other restaurants in the area.

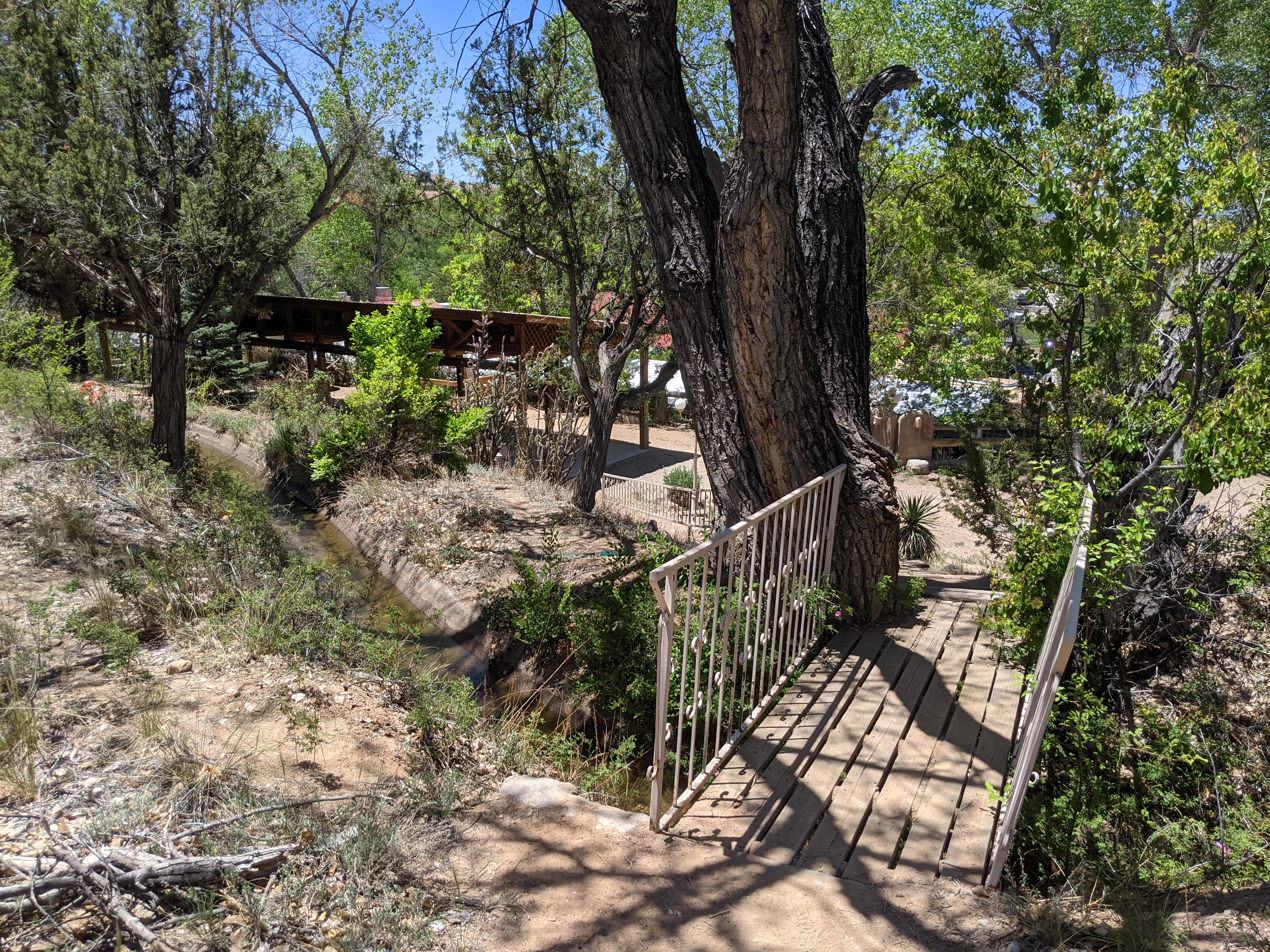
The Reservoir Ditch, an acequia fed by the Santa Cruz River, behind Rancho de Chimayo
