= Yingde Black Tea =

Black tea from Yingde, China

Yingde
- Type: Black
- Other names: Yingde Hongcha, Yingdehong, Guangdong Red, Guangdong Black, Yingde Black, Ying Hong
- Origin: Yingde, Guangdong, China
- Quick description: Sweet tea

Yingde Black Tea
- Traditional Chinese: 英德紅茶
- Simplified Chinese: 英德红茶
- Literal meaning: Yingde Red Tea
Transcriptions
Standard Mandarin
- Hanyu Pinyin: Yīngdé hóngchá
- Wade–Giles: Ying-te hung-cha
- IPA: [íŋ.tɤ̌ xʊ̌ŋ.ʈʂʰǎ]

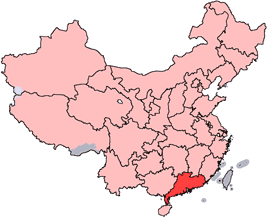
Yingde Black Tea is grown in Guangdong province, China.

Yingde Black Tea is the particular black tea produced and processed in Yingde County, Qingyuan Prefecture, in central Guangdong Province in southeastern China. First processed mechanically in 1959, its reputation has allowed much of the tea to be exported. Some prestige varieties are produced, which generally resemble leaf oolong.

The tea should have a cocoa-like aroma and, like most Chinese black teas, a sweet aftertaste.
