= Brasserie de Bellevaux =

Craft brewery in Liège Province, Belgium

Coordinates: 50.3919°N 6.0073°E

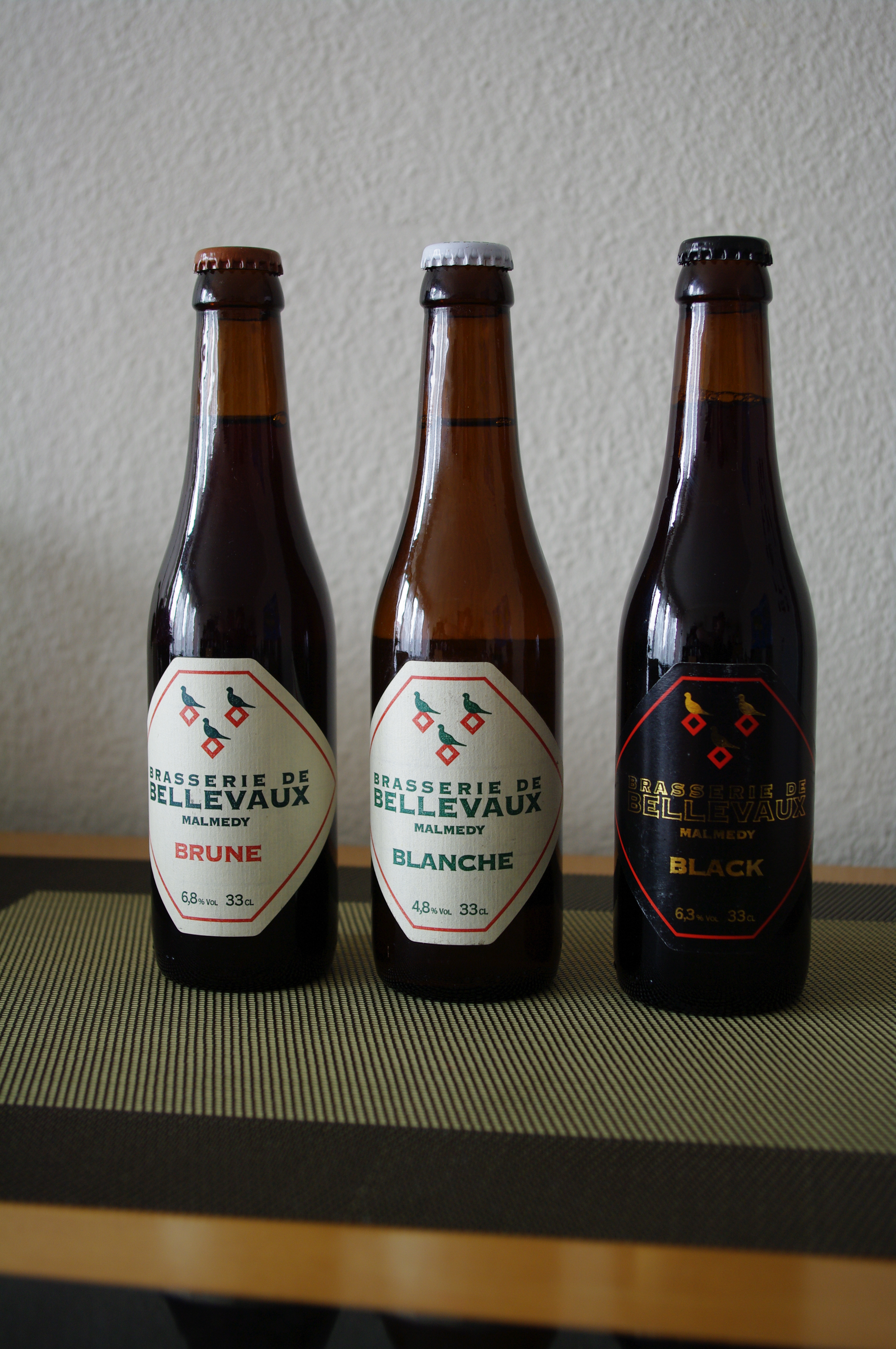

The Brasserie de Bellevaux is a Belgian craft brewery located in the ancienne commune of Bellevaux, municipality of Malmedy, Liège Province. The brewery produces five special beers including four called Bellevaux. These beers are brewed in ancient copper vats.

== History ==
The brewery was founded in 2006 by the Dutch family of brewers Schuwer-Berhuis. The logo of the brewery represents three merlettes on three mascles.

== Beers ==
Five homemade 33 cl beers unfiltered, unpasteurized and with high fermentation are also produced and sold. The brewery draws the water necessary to the making of the beers from a pure water spring in the Ardennes.

- The Bellevaux light ale: 7% alcohol by volume (ABV)
- The Bellevaux bitter: 6.8% ABV
- The Bellevaux white: 4.8% ABV
- The Bellevaux black: 3.1% ABV
- The Triple Malmedy: 9% ABV
