= Green Hungarian =

Variety of grape

- Grape (Vitis)
- Color of berry skin: Blanc
- Species: Vitis vinifera
- Also called: Butschera, Putzscheere and other synonyms
- Origin: Hungary

Green Hungarian, Butschera (Hungarian) or Putzscheere (German) is a white Hungarian wine grape. It is also found in California, but in recent years the grape has been declining in number of plantings.

The grape variety is likely to have originated from the border area between Hungary and Romania, or the Carpathians. In former times, it was much cultivated in much of central and eastern Europe as a high-yielding grape for simple wines, which has resulted that it is known under a large number of synonyms in different languages. It was also used as a table grape. Today, very little of it remains in cultivation in Europe.

== Synonyms ==
Green Hungarian is also known under the synonyms Aramon du Nord, Bela Pelesovna, Bela Selenika, Belline, Bockseckel, Butschera, Elender, Glockauer, Grüne (Selena) Pelesovna, Gyöngy Szölö, Gyöngyszölö, Heinisch Rot, Hinschen Weiss, Lelt Szoeloe, Misera, Perlentraube, Putchir, Putscheere Bleu, Putscher, Putzcheere, Putzscheere, Raifler, Rothinsch, Rothreifler, Sauerlamper, Talburger, Tokauer, Tokayer, Treitsche, Ungar, Weisser Tokayer, and Zuti Krhkopetec.
