= Viru (beer) =

Estonian beer brand

Viru Beer logo since September 2010

Viru beer was Estonia's first ‘gypsy’ beer brand, developed by Baltic Beer Company in 2004. Viru brand name comes from the word Viru that is widely used in Northern parts of Estonia as the name for streets, buildings, businesses as well as two counties of East Viru (Ida-Viru maakond )and West Viru (Lääne-Viru maakond). There are several theories about the origins of the name Viru (more can be found in the Wikipedia article about Vironians)

The Viru bottle was created by Baltic Beer Company to reflect the historical medieval bottles once used in the region and revive the classic art-deco style of Estonia's first independence in the 1920s.

Baltic Beer Company Ltd (formerly Brand Independence Ltd) is a company based in London, UK.

== History ==
It was introduced to the British market in 2006, initially being supplied to high-quality bars and restaurants in London and other cities. The beer was launched in Italy in 2007 then Switzerland and Sweden in 2008. The first shipment of Viru beer arrived in Japan in 2009 followed by the United States and Canada in 2010. In February 2010 Baltic Beer Company announced sponsorship deal with the Team Suzuki Alstare where Viru Beer became a co-sponsor of the team in 2010–2011 seasons.

== The Product ==
The first beer, Viru Premium was a 5.0% ABV pilsner-style beer. Initially brewed under contract by the A. Le Coq brewery it is now made in smaller batches at an independent craft brewery.

Viru Premium has been awarded a number of medals at international beer competitions including 5 gold medals.

Baltic Beer Company works with independent brewers aiming to create recipes which reflect classic beers styles with an Estonian twist.

They have developed a number of craft brews, such as Baltic Blonde, Estonian Rye beer and White IPA. These beers are sold primarily in bars, independent bottle shops, craft beer pubs and on-line stores.

== Gallery ==
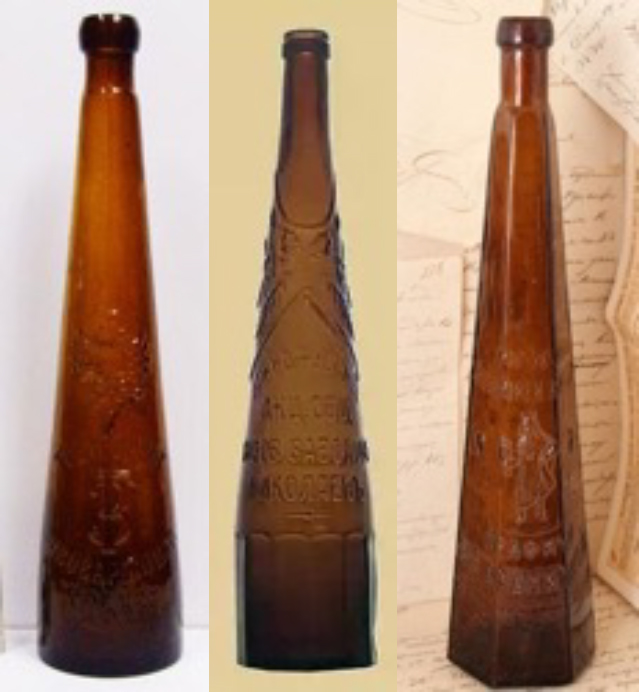

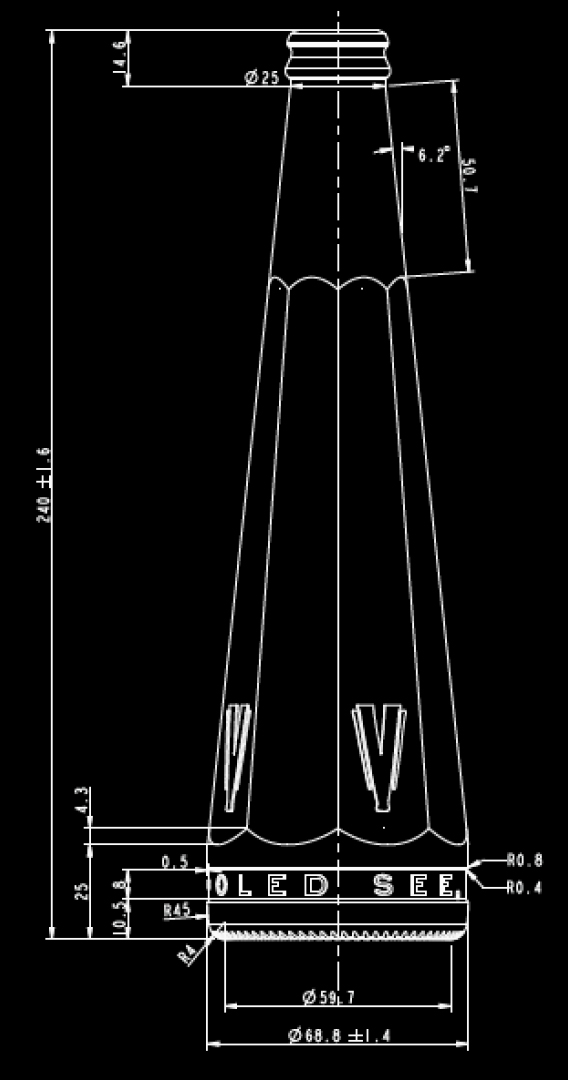

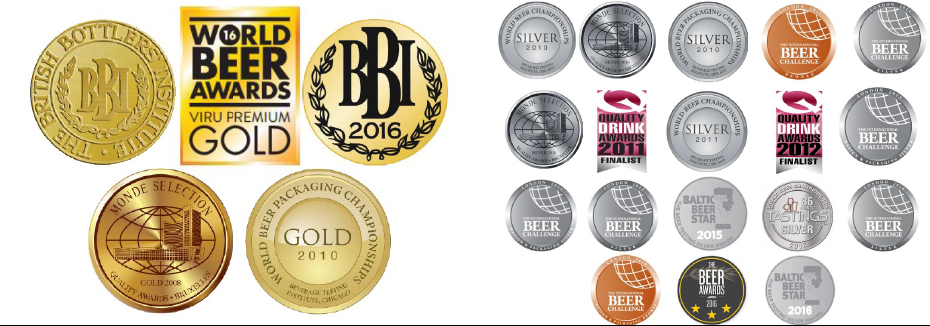

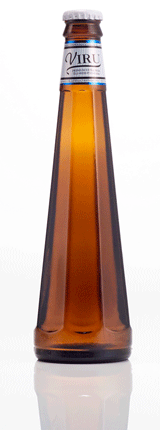
Viru Bottle with the old label until October 2007

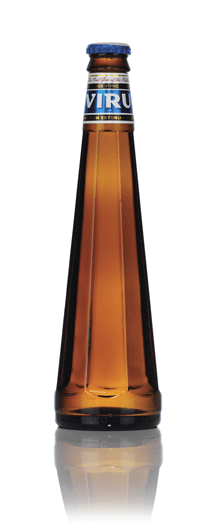
Viru bottle with a new label since October 2007

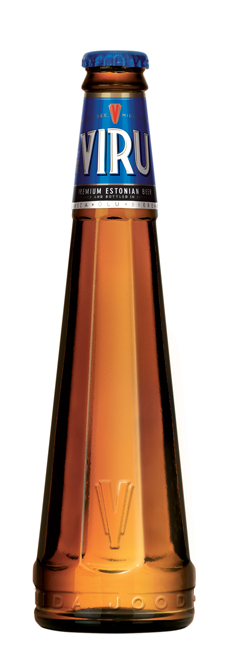
Viru new bottle with the new label from November 2010

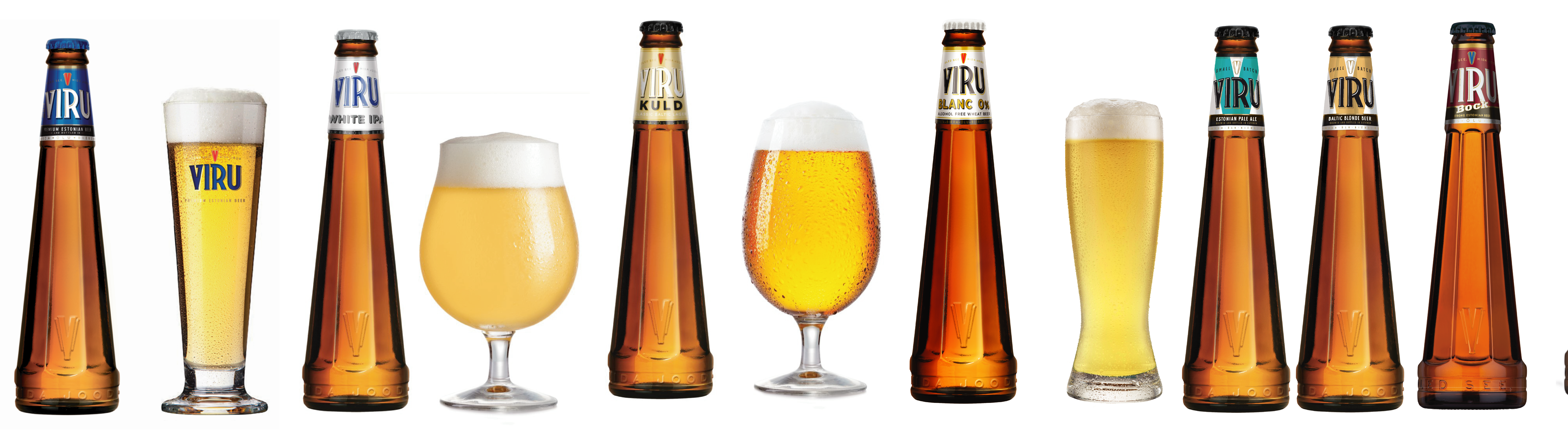

Team Suzuki Alstare 2010 in Viru colours
