= Shanjuan Cave =

Cave in Jiangsu province, China

Yixing Shanjuan Cave is located at the south-west of Yixing, 25 kilometres away in Luoyan Mountain. It is the earliest cave tourist attractions in China, managed by Yangxian Scenic Spot Tourism Development Company.

== History ==
In the Three kingdoms period it was called 'Stone Room'. During the Liang dynasty it was called 'Jiudou Cave'. In the Northern and Southern dynasties Shanjuan Temple was built by the cave. During the Tang dynasty it was used as a private tomb. In the tenth year in the Republic of China, squire Chu Nanqiang raised money to repair the Shajuan Cave. After Liberation, Chu Nanqiang handed over the cave to the government. The cave was opened to public officially on the November in the 23rd year of the Republic.

Early in 1956, Shanjuan Cave was listed as the first kind of units of cultural relics protection. In 1982, it was named national important scenic spot. In 2001, it was evaluated as national four-A scenic spot and the education base of minors in Jiangsu Province. On May in 2006, it was awarded as 'Viliage of Liang Shanbo and Zhu Yingtai in China' by China folk artist association.

== Description ==
=== Upper cave or Cloud cave ===
The entrance has a huge rock blocking the convecting air in the cave, which leads to the difference of temperature between Upper and Middle caves. Therefore, the temperature in Upper cave remains around 23 °C all year.

=== Middle cave ===
Middle cave is connected to Upper Cave by spiral stairs. Seven meters Zhong Ru Stone bamboo shoots stands upright the cave, called Di Zhu peak. By the nature of water droplets for hundreds of years, many Zhong Ru Stones have been set into all kinds of different forms.

=== Lower cave ===
Lower cave is a broad place with a fall and cliff.

=== Water cave ===
The water cave is a 120-meter long underground river, with water nearly 4 meters deep.
