= Cuisine of Berlin =

German municipal cuisine

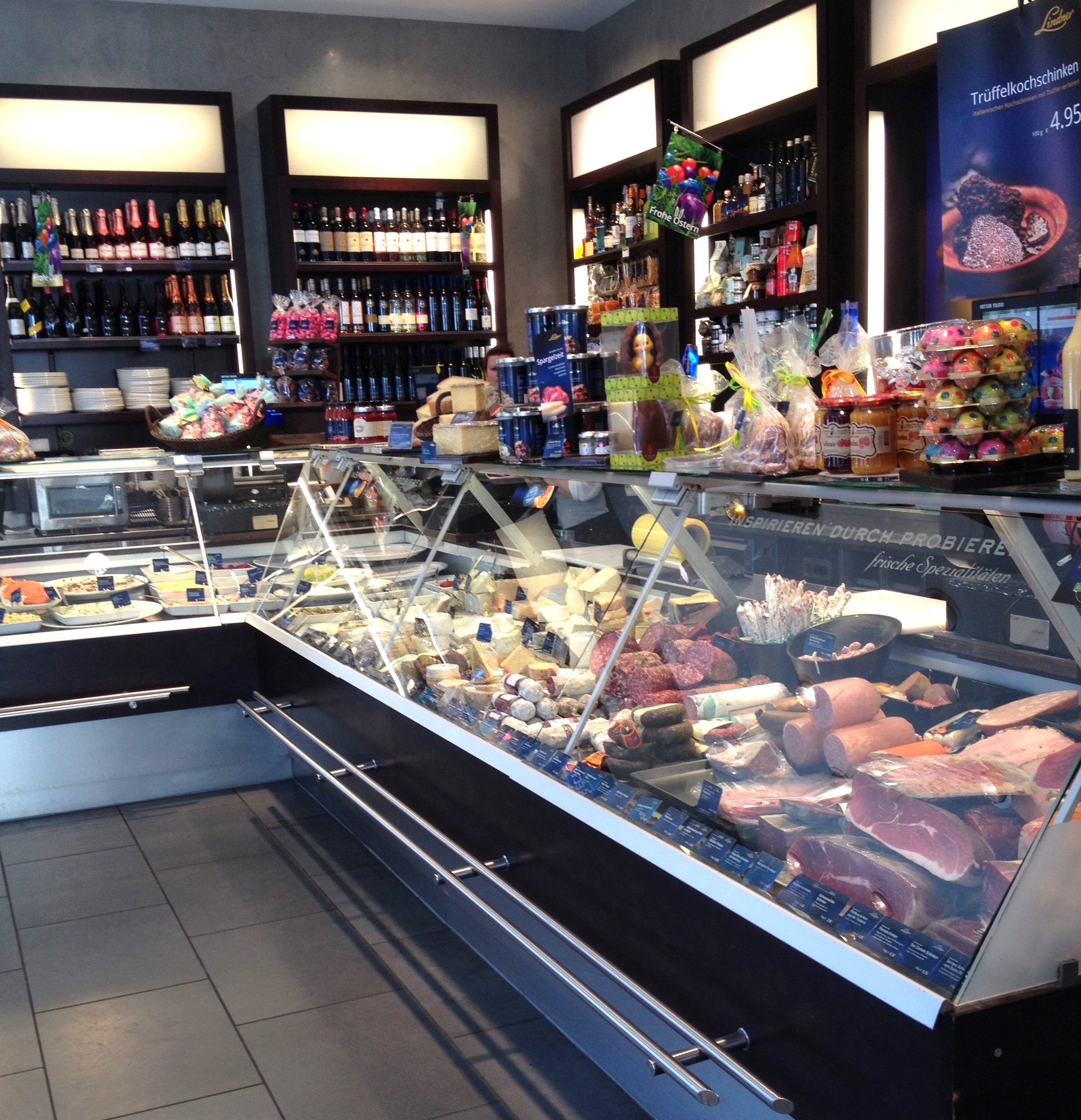
Deli in Berlin

Cuisine of Berlin describes different aspects of Berlin's culinary offerings. On the one hand, it means the traditional Berlin cuisine of Berlin households with dishes from the German cuisine. On the other hand, often a rustic pub and snack kitchen, which has become increasingly international due to many migration waves since 1945 and 1990. After 2000, numerous top-class restaurants have evolved in Berlin.

== History ==
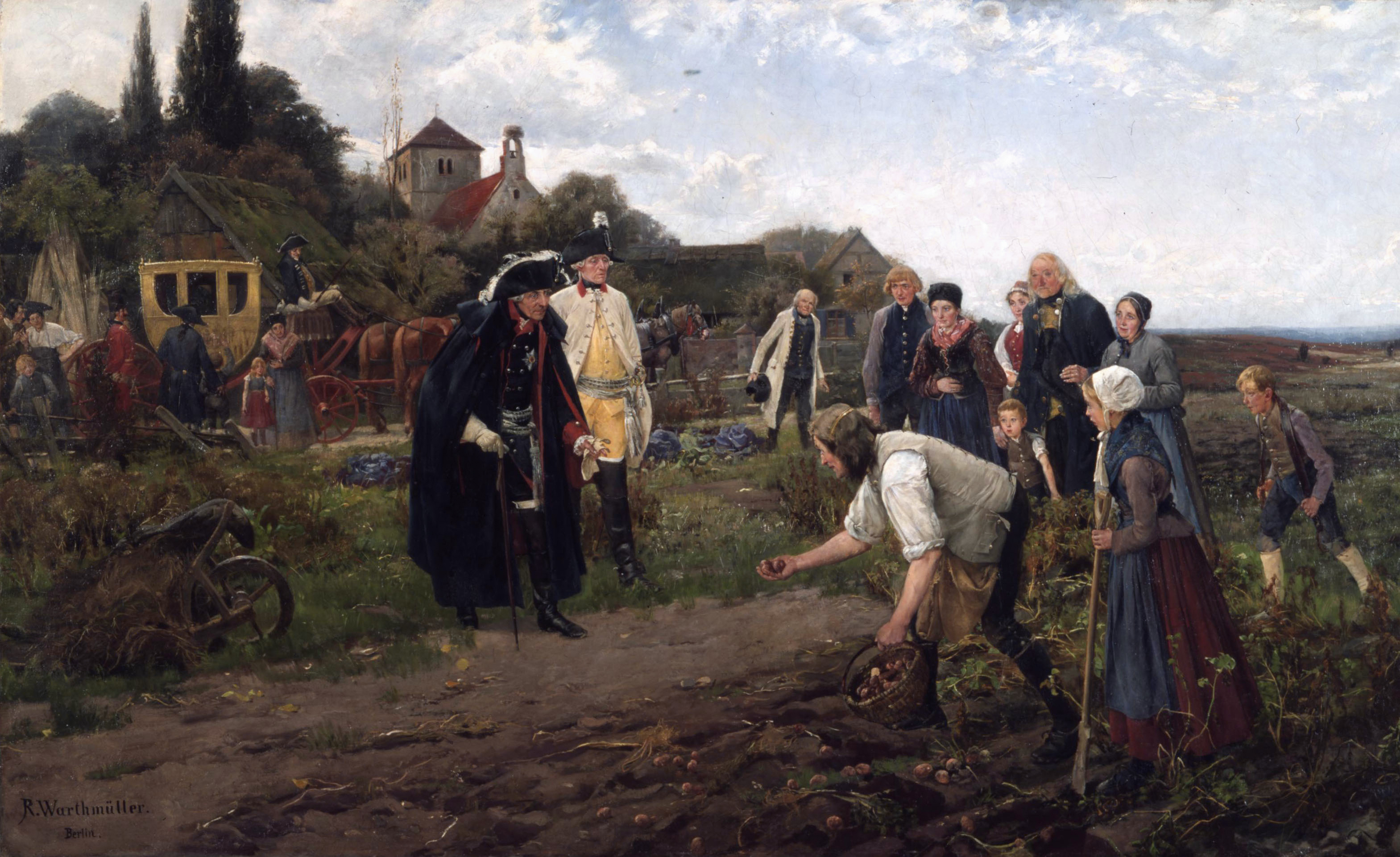
King Frederick the Great inspects the potato cultivation around 1750

Until the end of the 19th century, the Berlin kitchen was a simple kitchen, which emphasized hearty taste and saturation rather than refinement. In the 17th century, numerous Huguenots settled in Berlin and brought their cooking traditions with them. The Prussian-Protestant kitchen integrated these influences essentially through simplification.

Typical ingredients were pork, goose and fish such as carp, eel and pike, cabbage, legumes such as peas, lentils and beans as well as beets, cucumbers and potatoes. What is striking – from today's perspective – is the frequent use of the noble crayfish, which made it possible to catch fish rich in Berlin in the 18th and 19th centuries.

With the founding of the German Empire, Berlin became the capital of a world empire and the arrival from different provinces expanded the city's cooking tradition, and Berlin cuisine began to internationalize. Jewish and Eastern European types of preparation were added, which expanded the menu in the capital.

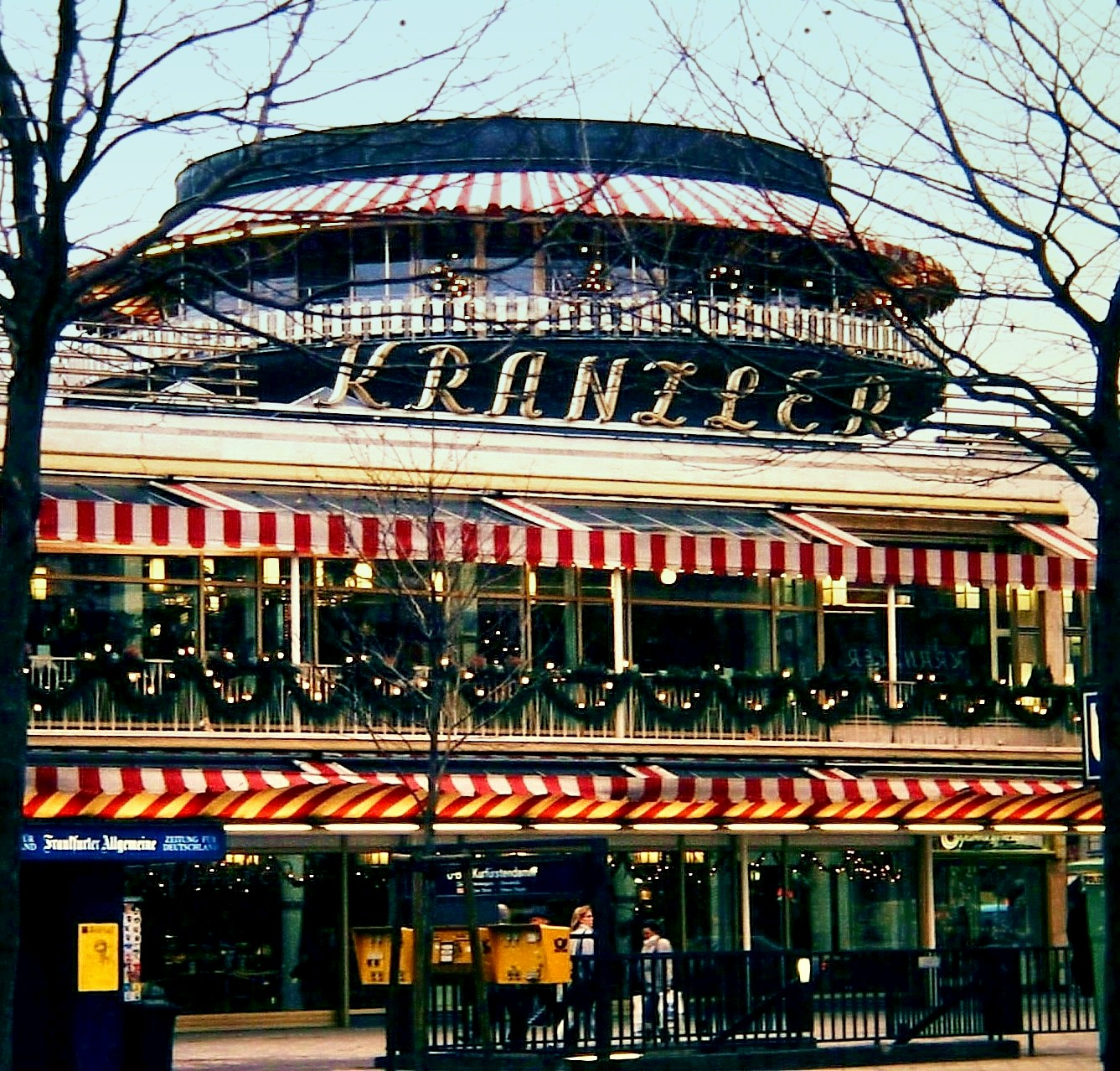
Café Kranzler in 1988

In the 1920s, Berlin was one of the largest cities in the world. Numerous large hotels and restaurants offered different dishes. The Nazi regime and the Second World War of annihilation that followed put an end to this culinary diversity. While in the eastern part, as the de facto capital of the GDR, the upscale gastronomy almost completely disappeared and international influences did not appear for decades, the restaurant scene in the west recovered slowly from this break.

The first restaurants for fine cuisine opened in the rebuilt City West after the war. During the division of Berlin, the delicatessen department of KaDeWe remained one of the largest of its kind in the world and is still very popular with city residents and tourists alike.

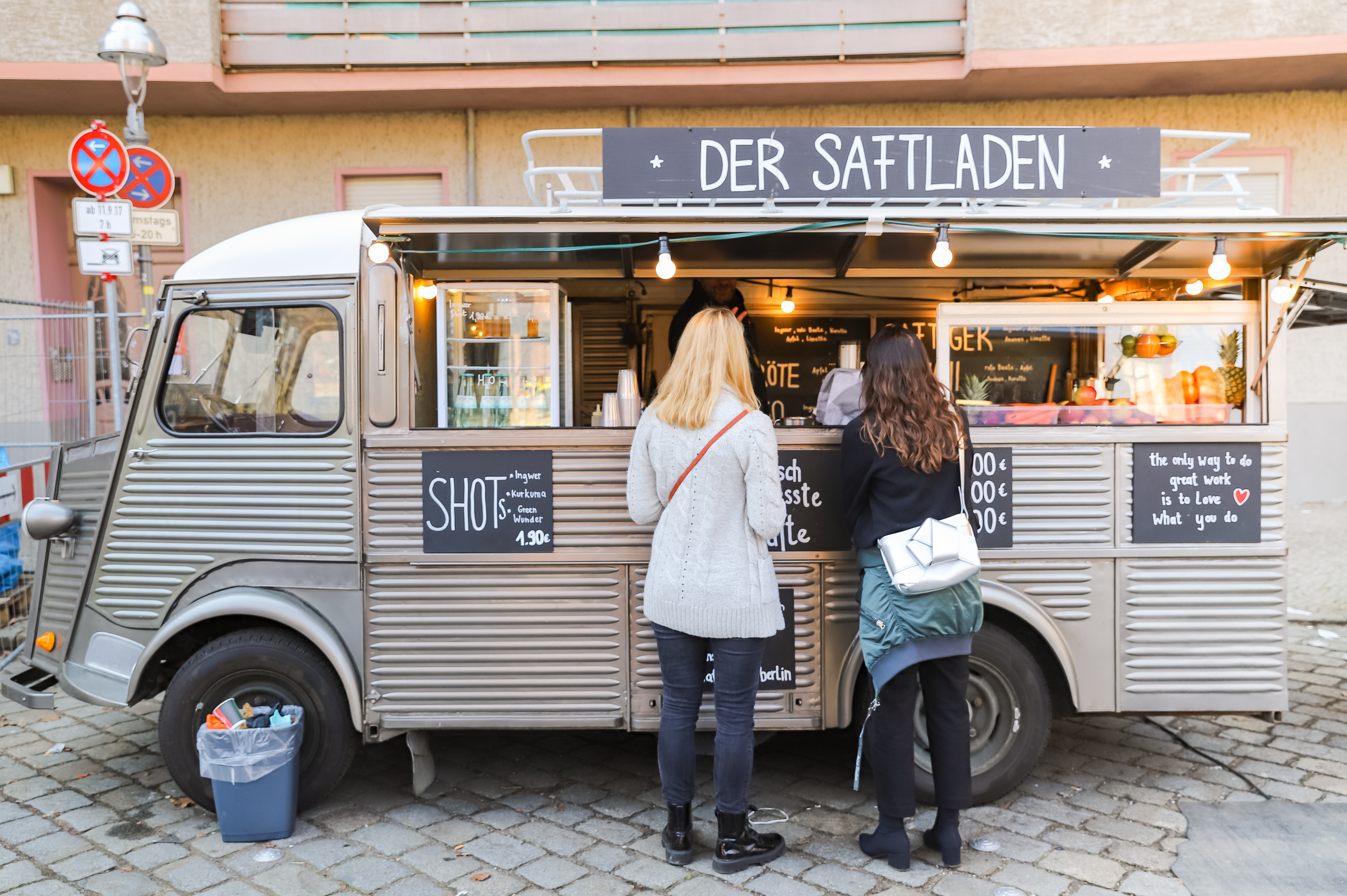
Juice bar truck in 2019

The Berlin currywurst is said to have been invented in 1949 by Herta Heuwer from Königsberg, who was running a small snack stand in Charlottenburg at the time.

In 1958, the Café Kranzler opened on Kurfürstendamm, which wanted to follow the pre-war coffeehouse culture. The café established itself in the following years as a West Berlin institution.

Due to the labour migration after the Second World War, the Berlin kitchen internationalized again. Turkish immigrants are said to have invented the doner kebab in Kreuzberg in the 1970s, which is now considered one of the most typical Berlin snacks.

Since reunification in 1990 at the latest, Berlin has been able to establish itself again as a metropolis for gourmets. Even in the former eastern part such as Mitte or Prenzlauer Berg, there are now numerous restaurants with international offerings.

== Mealtimes ==
Breakfast is often consisting of bread rolls with either jam or cold meats and cheese, accompanied by coffee, tea or juice. The midday meal was traditionally the main meal of the day, but in modern times as Berliners work longer hours further from home this is no longer the case. The main meal is now often taken in the evening.

== Dishes ==
=== Meat dishes ===
- "Liver Berlin style" – Fried veal liver with onions and apple slices on mashed potatoes
- Currywurst
- Kassler – Salted and smoked roast pork
- Roast goose – Traditional Christmas dinner in many Berlin households
- Königsberger Klopse – Meatballs with anchovies and caper sauce
- Döner kebab
- Buletten
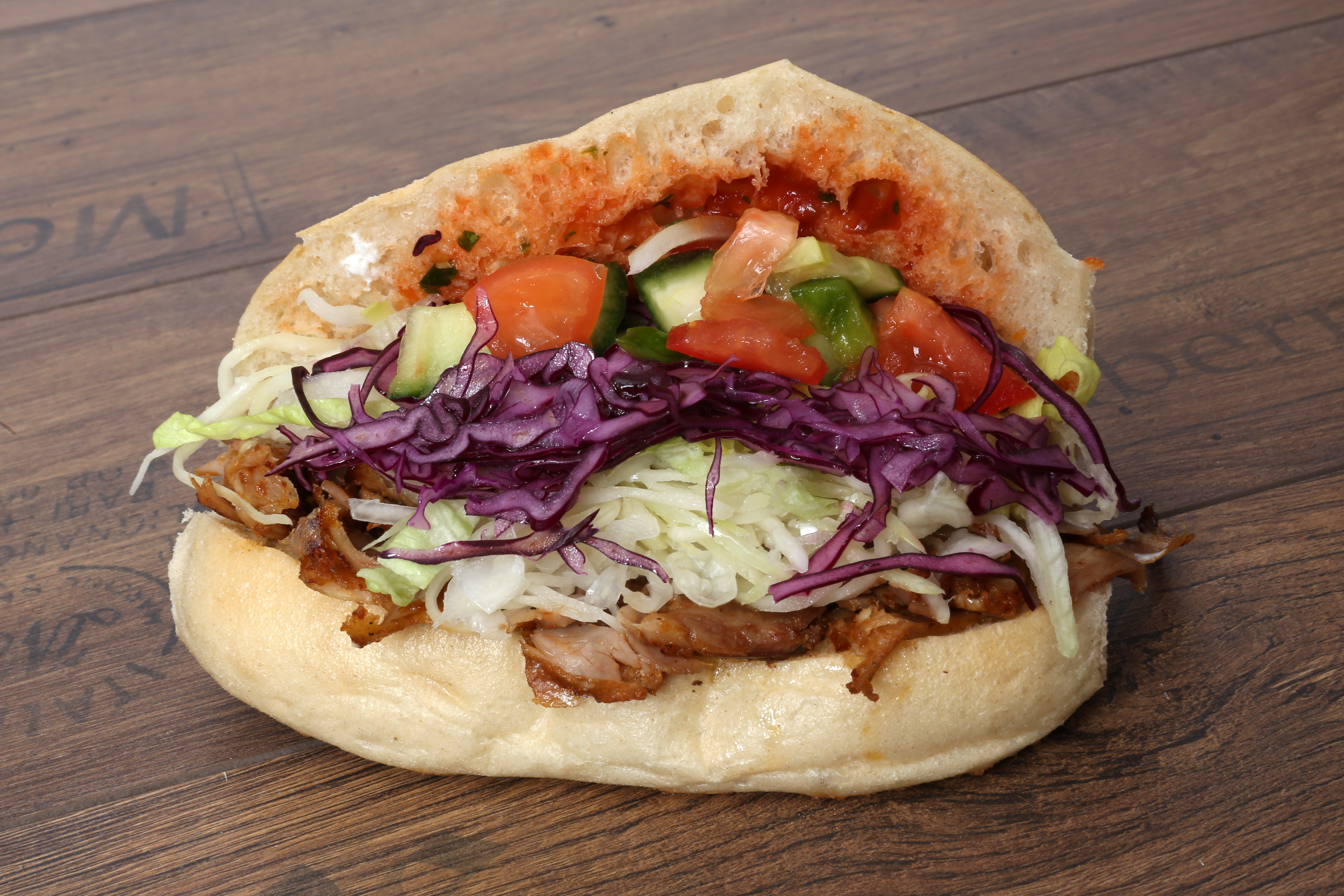
Döner kebab

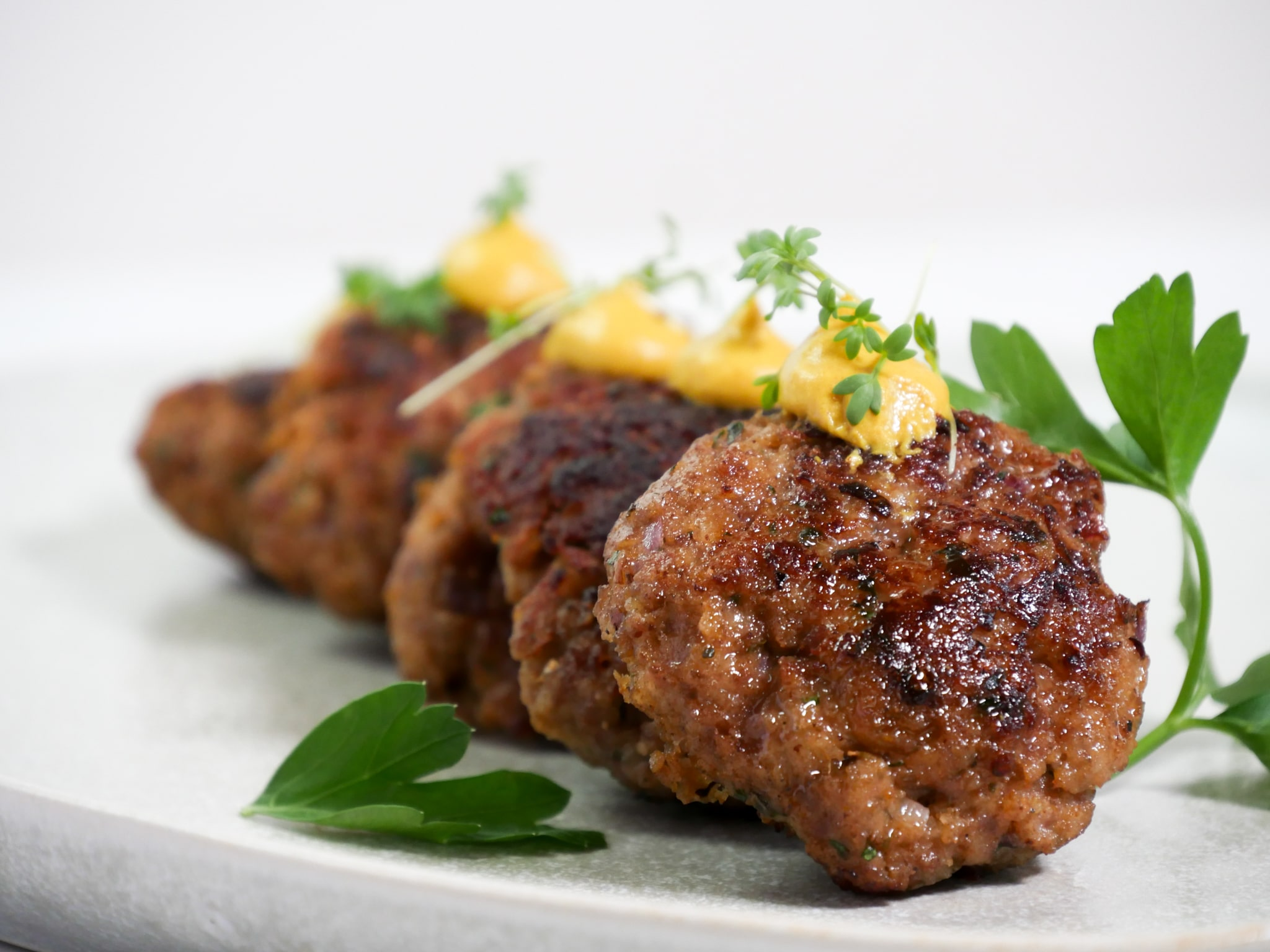
Buletten (fried meatballs)

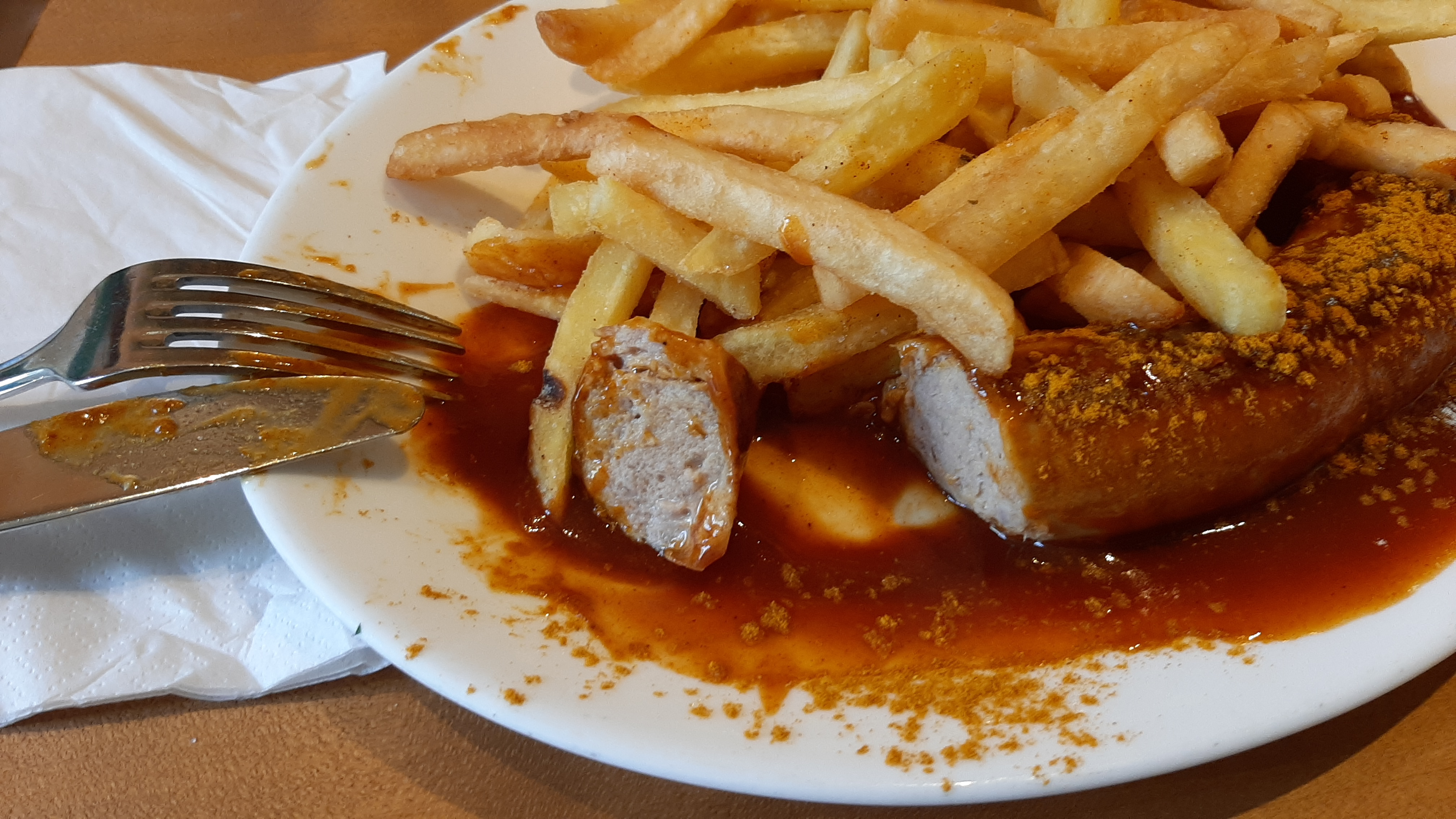
Currywurst with pommes frittes

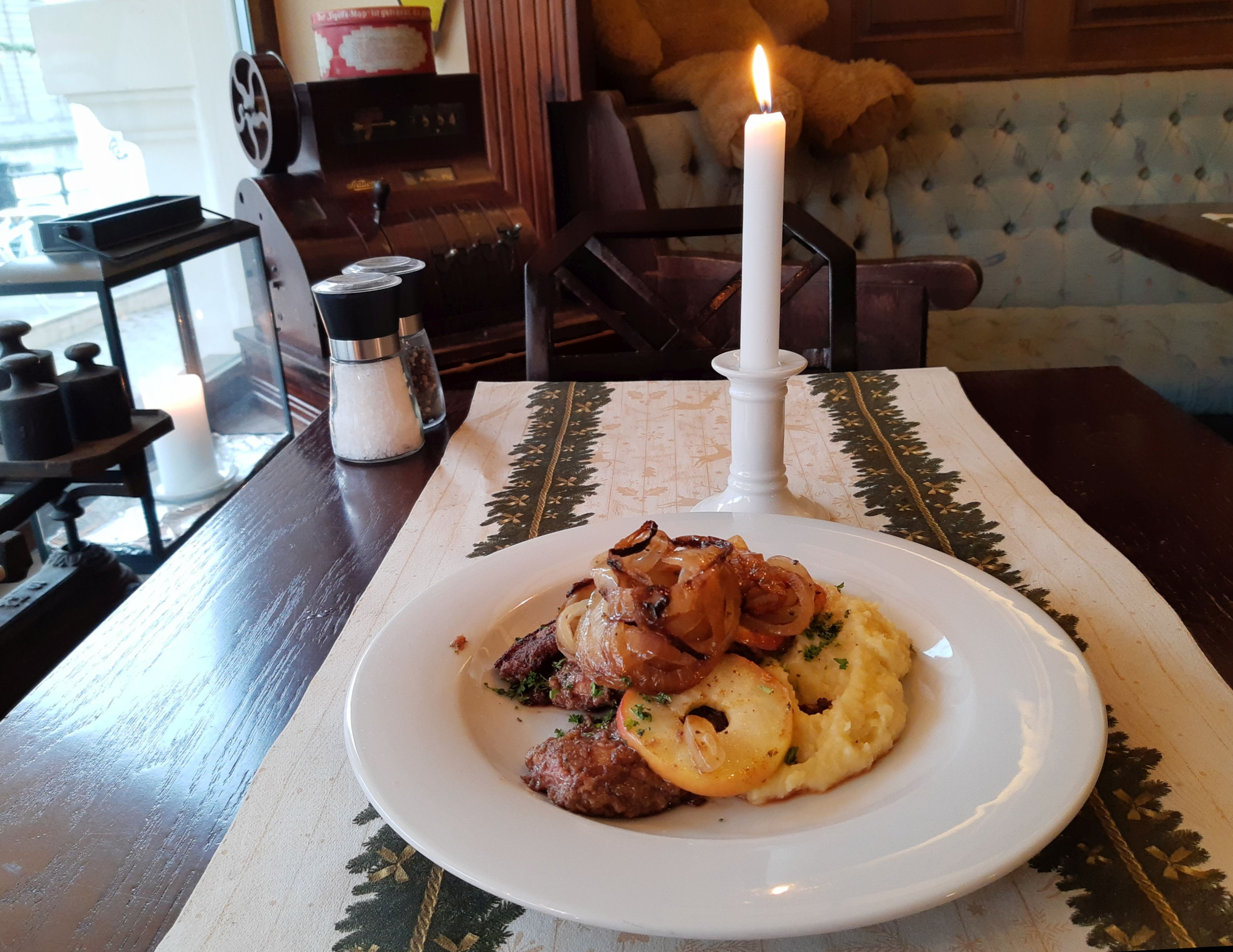
"Liver Berlin style” (veal liver with apples and onions)

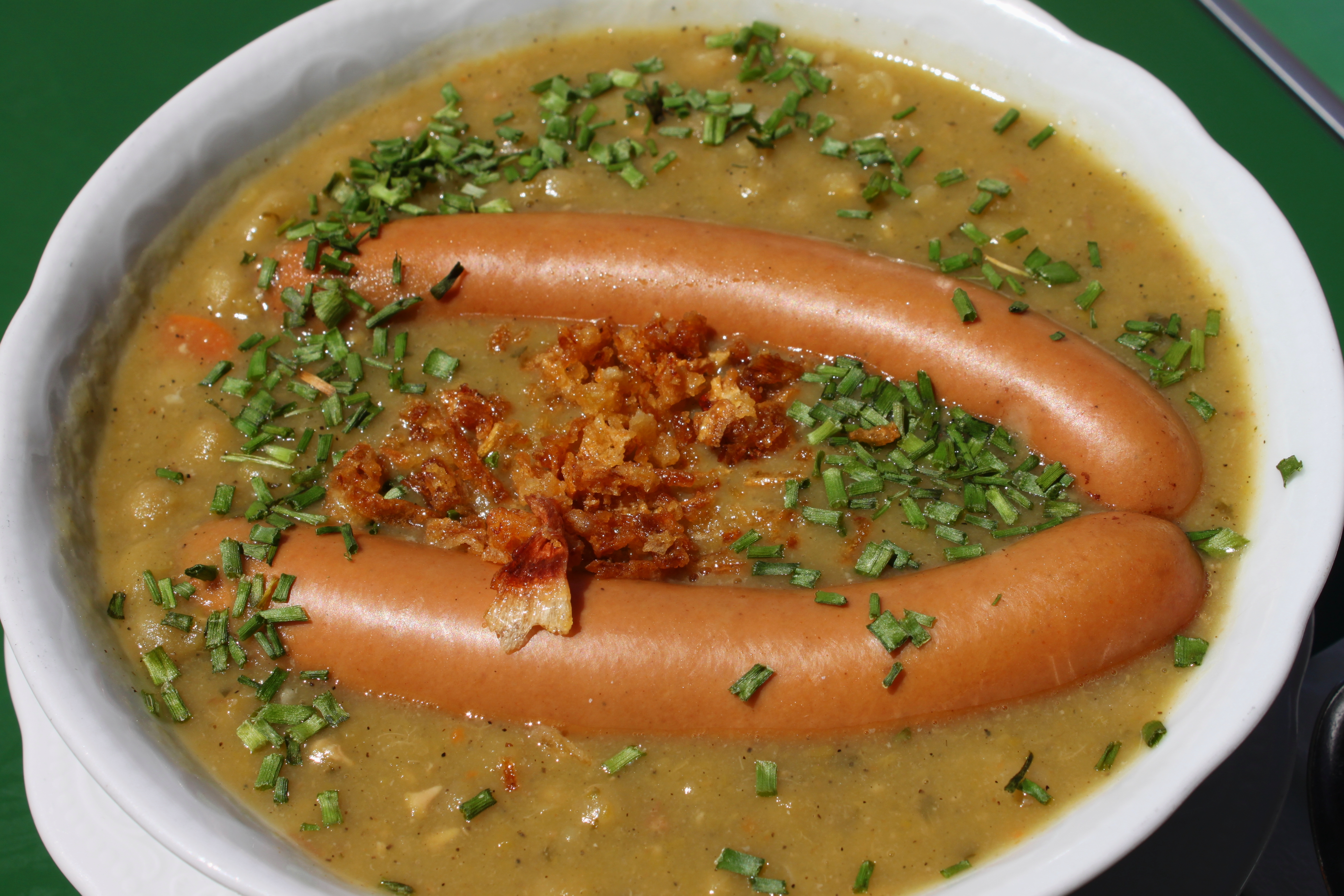
Pea soup with sausages

=== Fish dishes ===
- Rollmops – Pickled herring filets
- "Polish carp" – Carp in gingerbread sauce
- Hecht mit Butterkartoffeln
- "Aal grün" - Eel in herb sauce
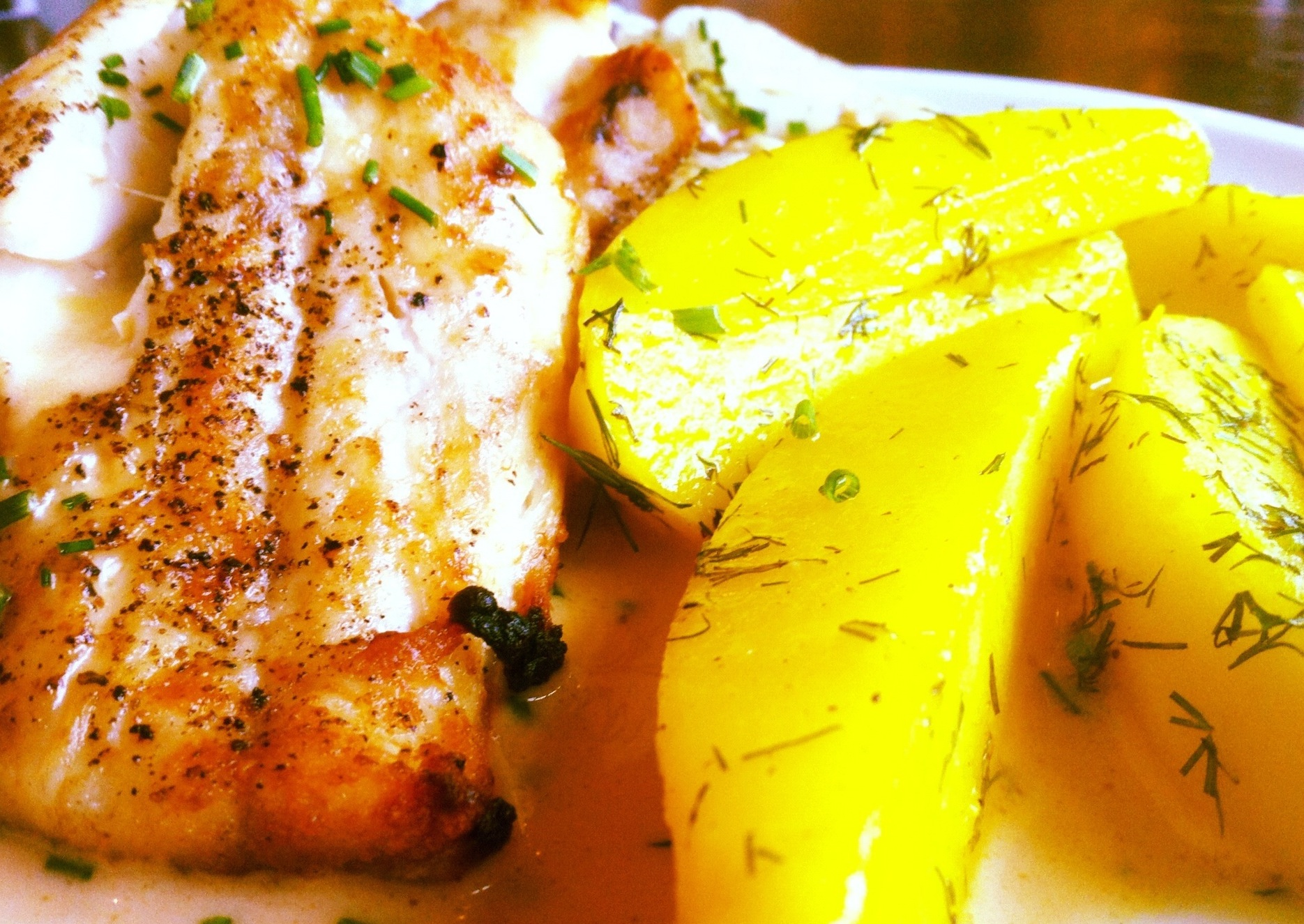
Hechtfilet

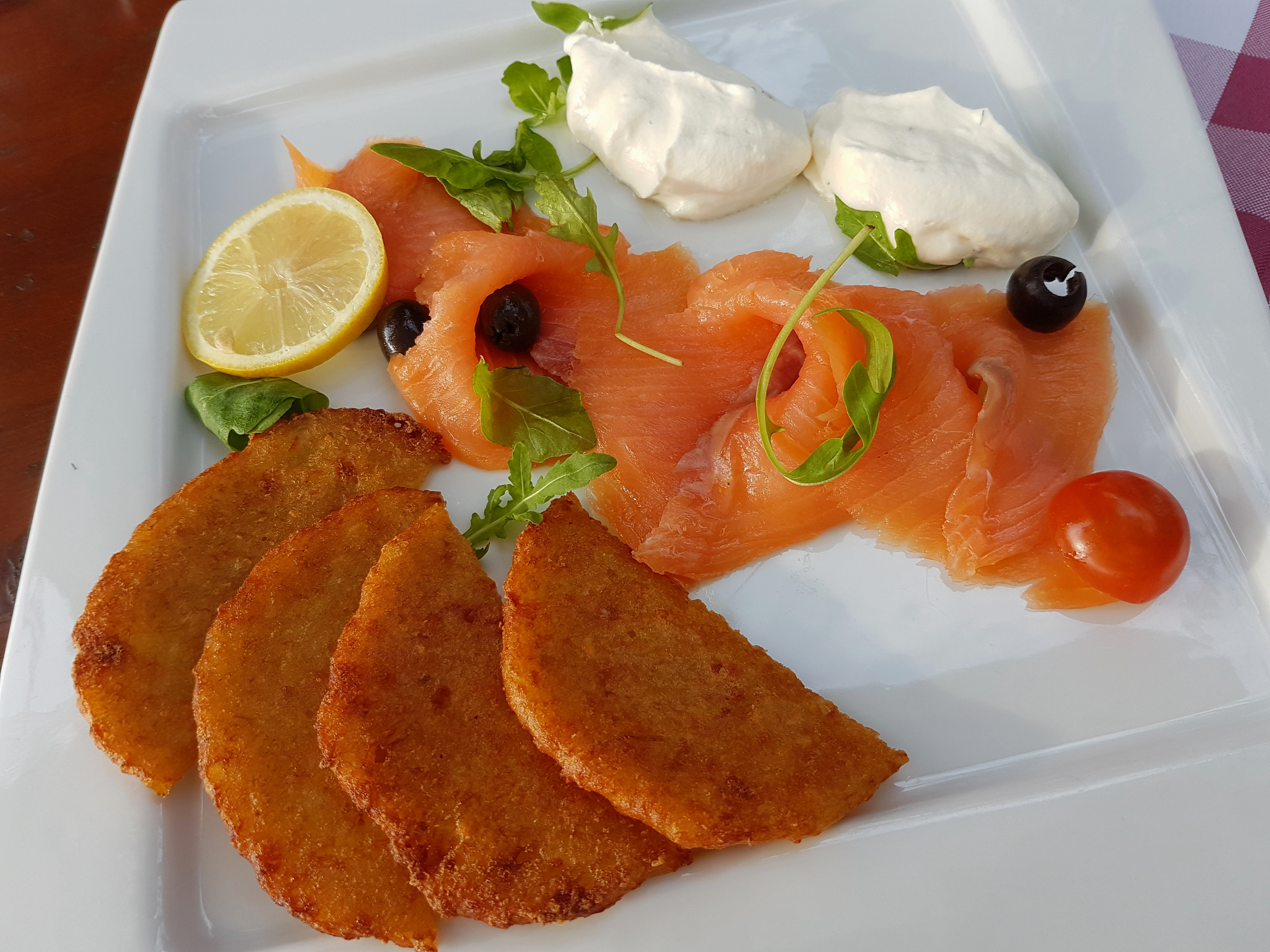
Salmon with cream horseradish and Kartoffelpuffer

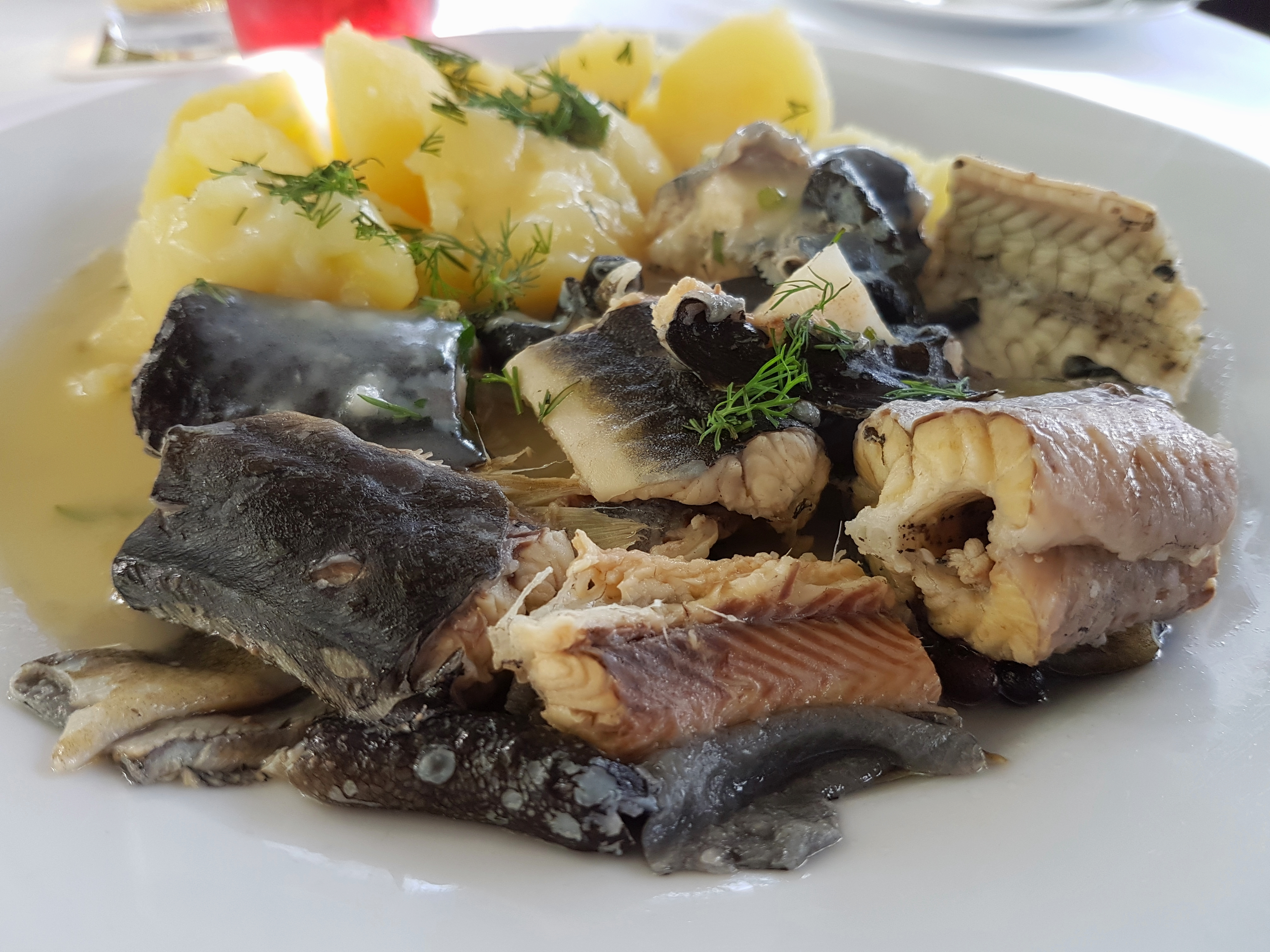
"Aal grün" - Eel in herb sauce

=== Vegetable dishes and side dishes ===
- Kartoffelpuffer – potato pancake, often found at Christmas markets, sweet with apple sauce and sugar or hearty with salmon and cream horseradish
- Pellkartoffeln with quark and linseed oil
- Teltower Rübchen – a cultivar of turnip (Brassica rapa var. teltowiensis) braised in butter and caramelized sugar; served as a side dish
- Sauerkraut
- Bratkartoffeln – served as a side dish or main course with fried egg
- Asparagus with Hollandaise sauce
- Linseneintopf - a type of lentil stew
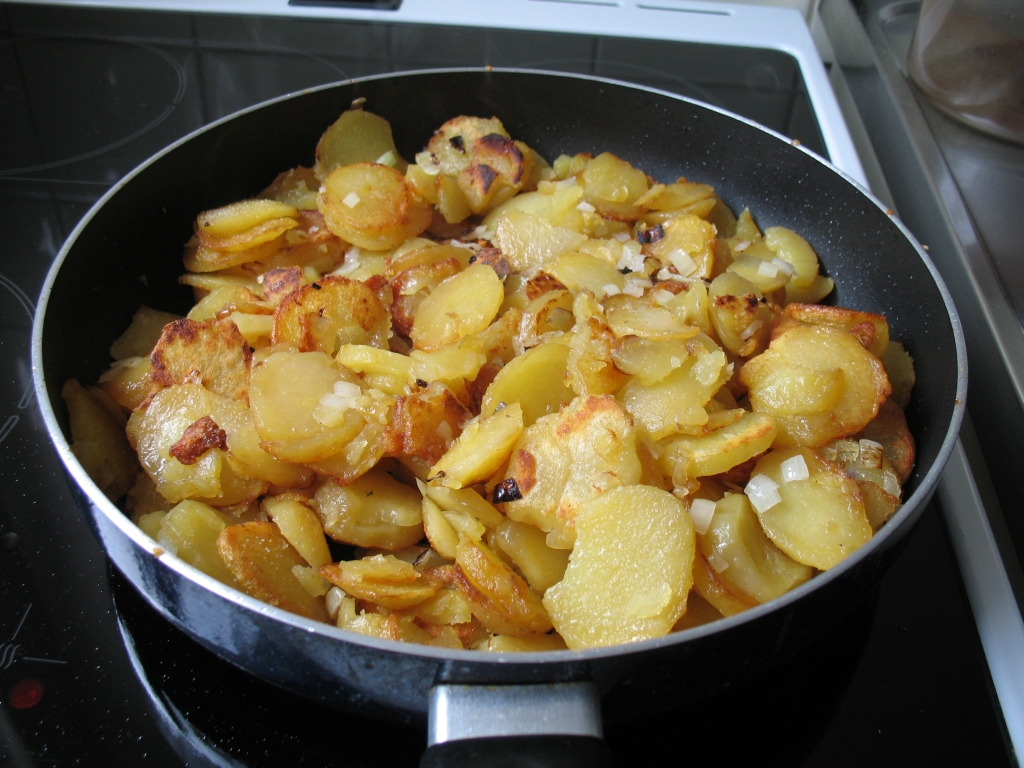
Bratkartoffeln

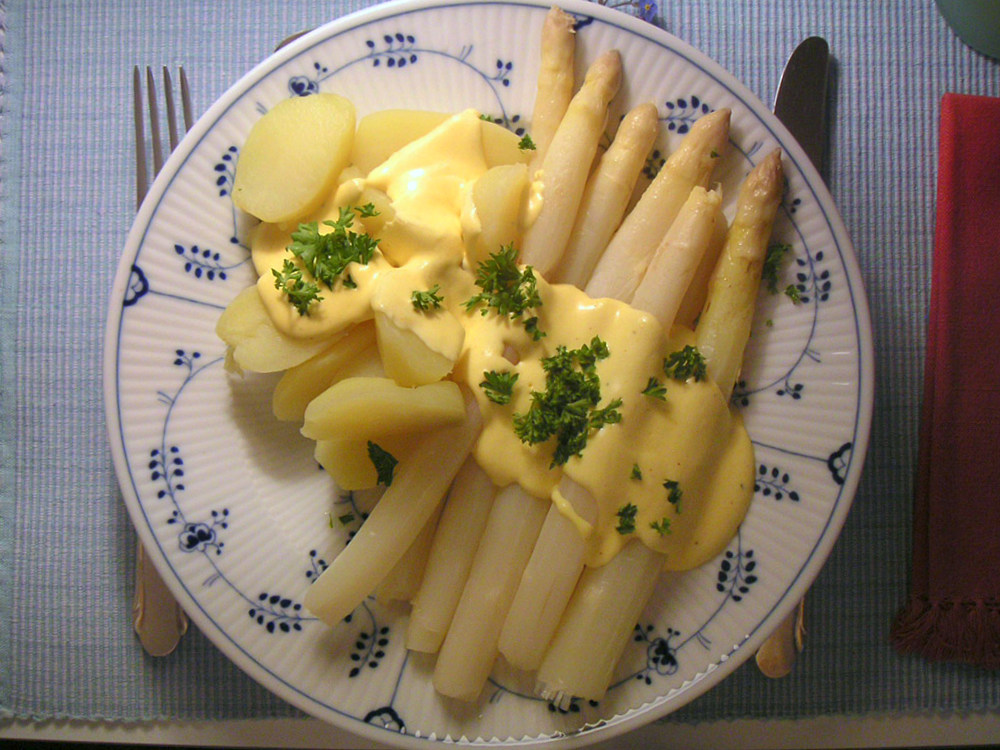
Asparagus with Hollandaise sauce

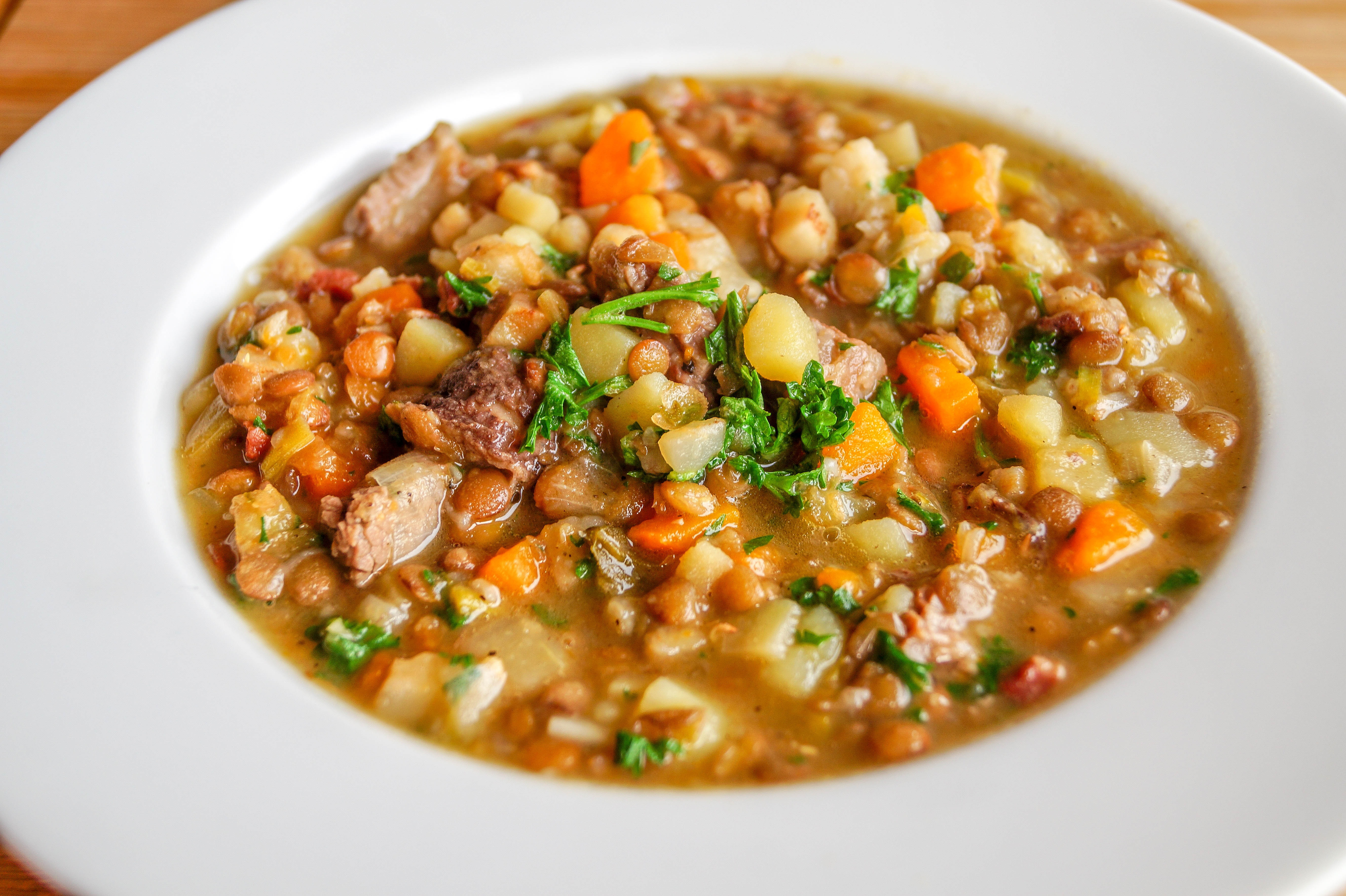
Lentil soup

== Sweets ==
=== Dessert ===
- "Berliner Luft" – ("Air of Berlin") White wine cream with raspberry sauce
- "Mohnpielen" – Bread pudding with poppy seeds
- "Rote Grütze" (German: [ˈʁoːtə ˈɡʁʏt͡sə]) – Red fruit stewed fruit usually served with vanilla sauce

=== Bakery products ===
- The "Berliner" or Berliner Pfannkuchen
- Berliner Napfkuchen – Yeast cake with raisins
- Berliner Käsekuchen – Cheese cake made from curd cheese mass with raisins and rum on a short pastry base
- "Liebesknochen" (" Love Bone") – German word for Eclair
- Pflaumenkuchen mit Streuseln
- Splitterbrötchen
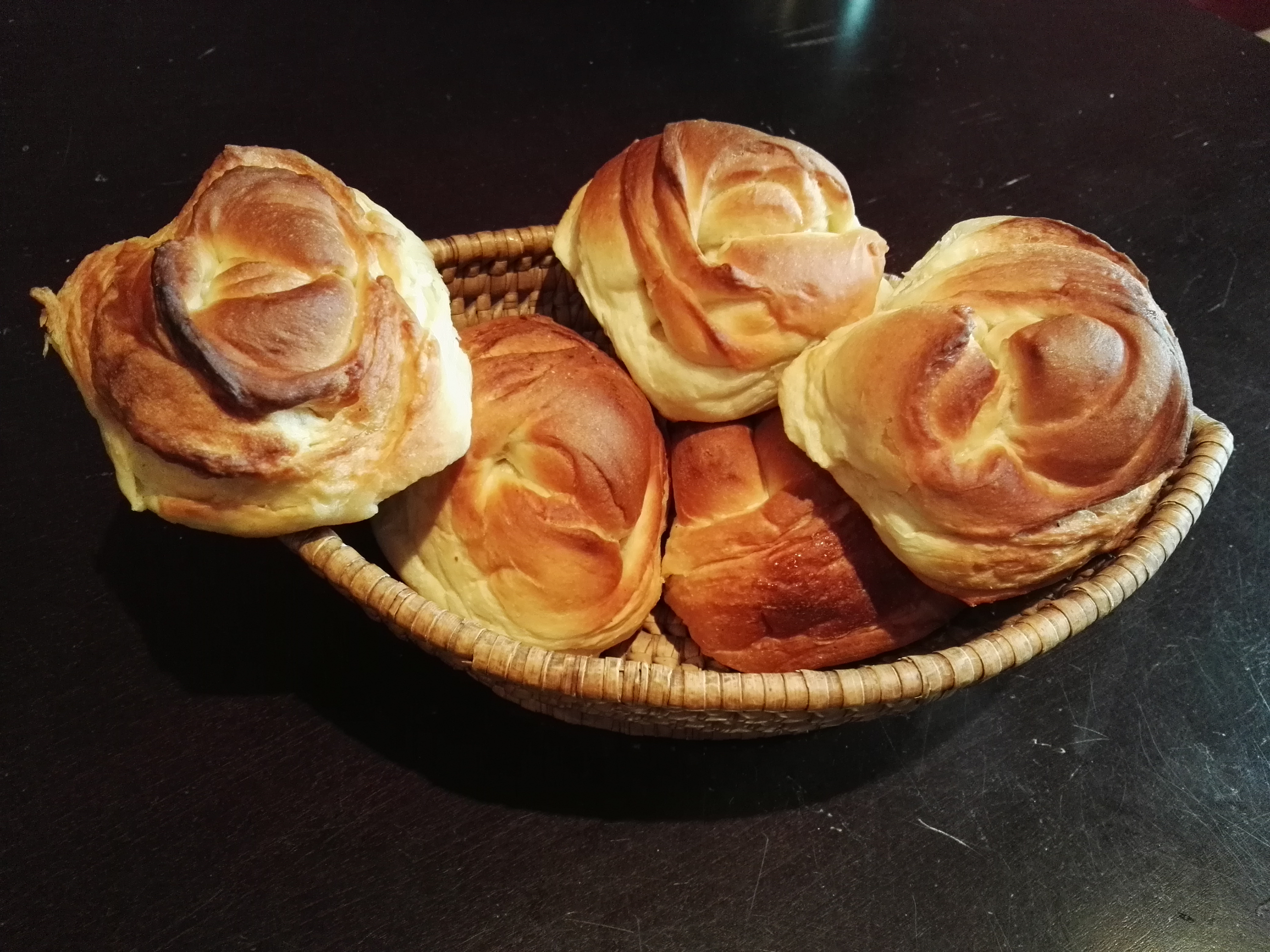
Splitterbrötchen

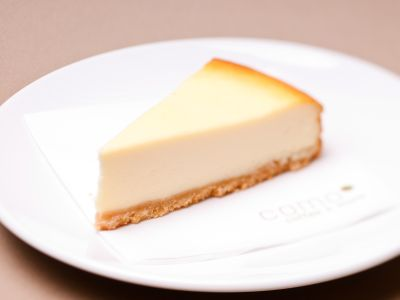
Cheesecake

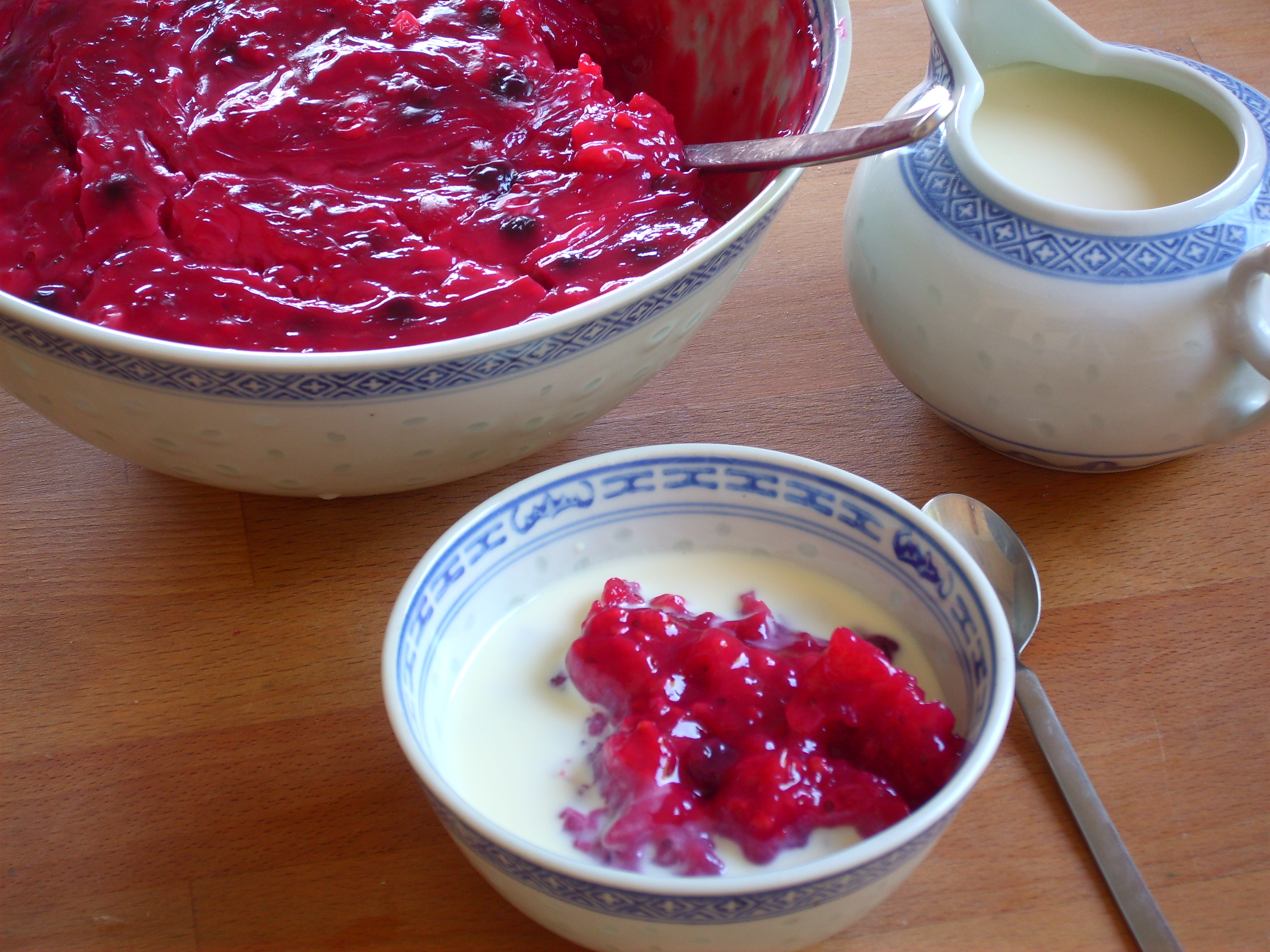
Rote Grütze

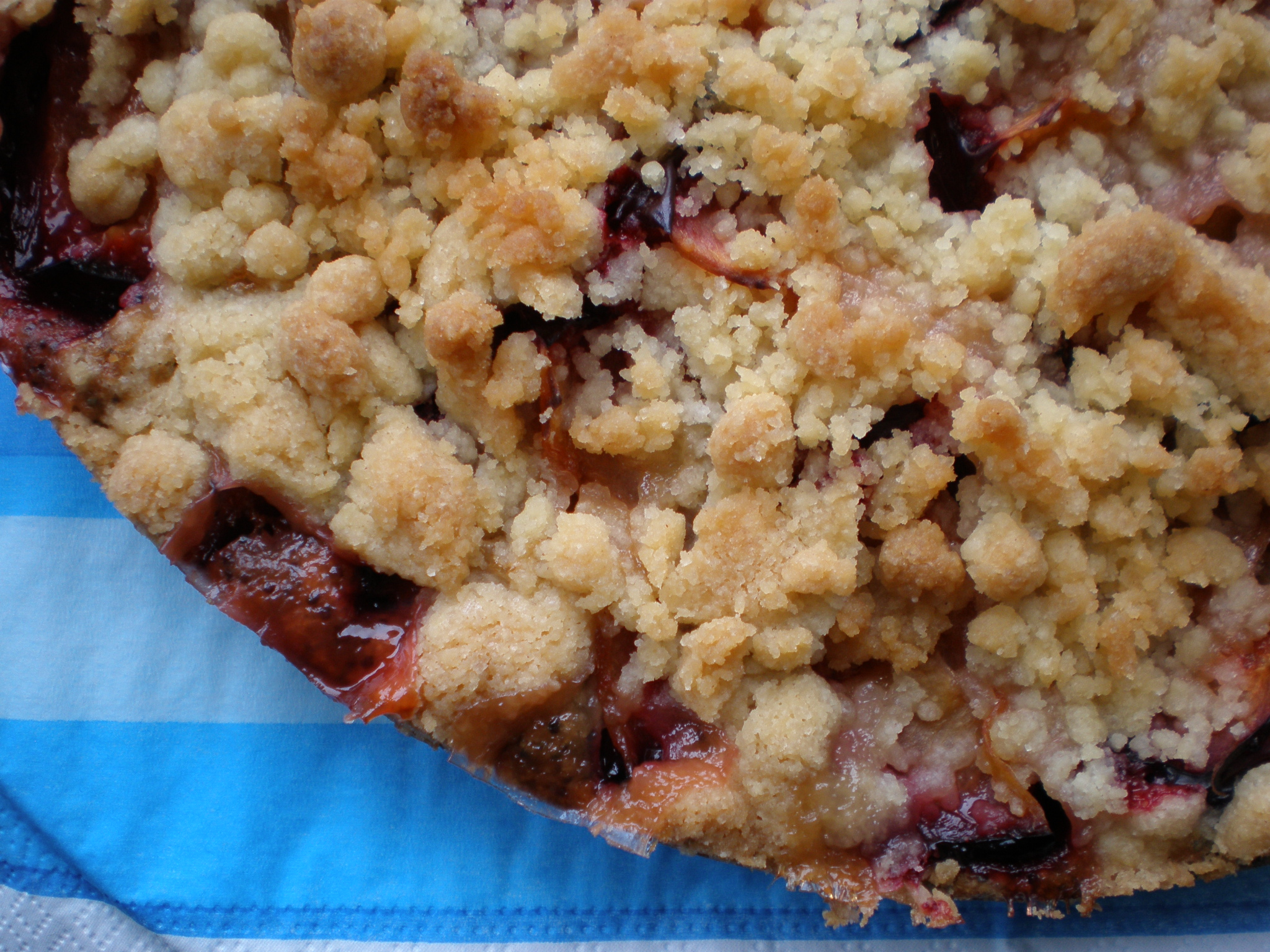
Plum Cake

== Beverages ==
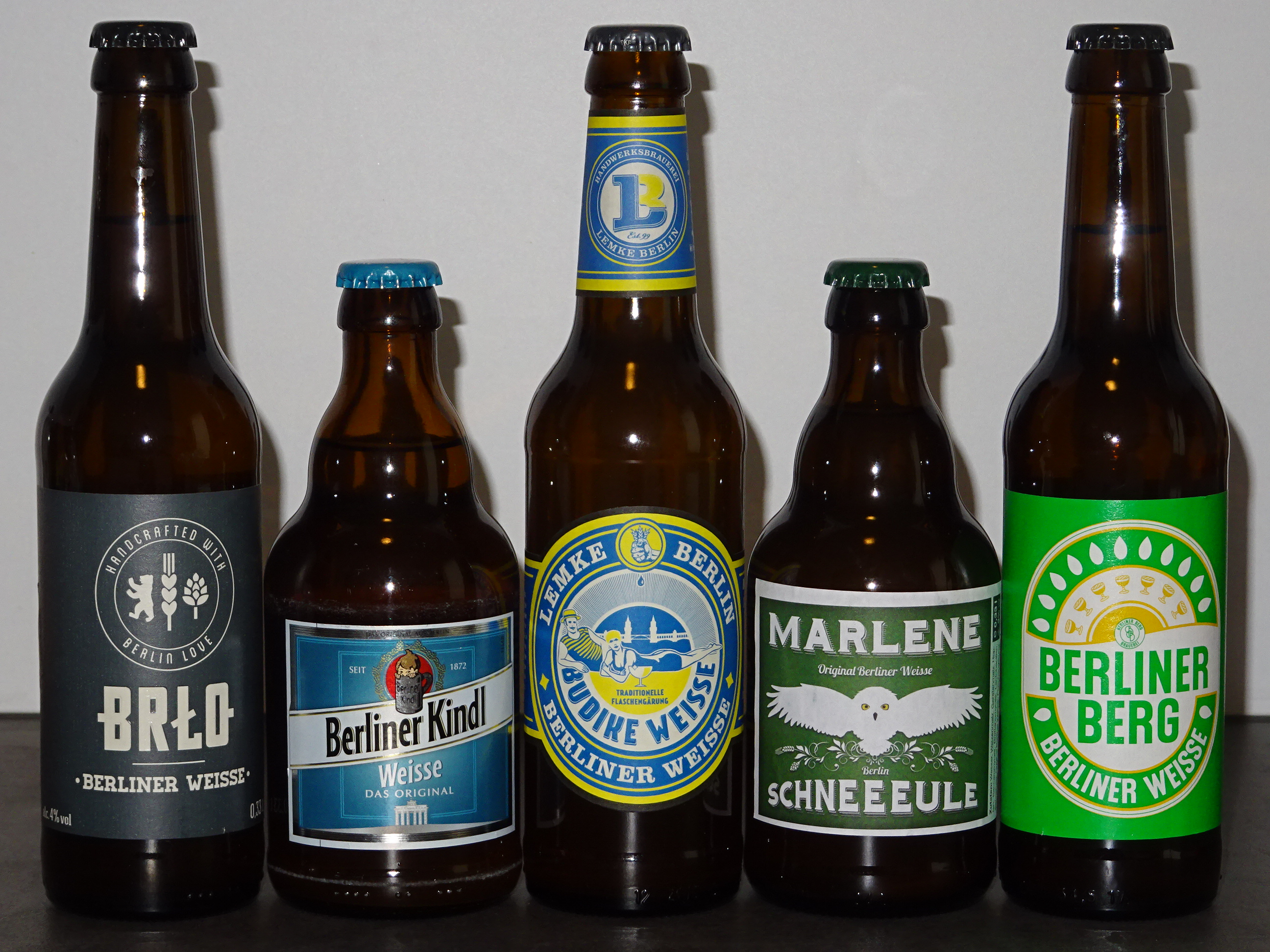
Berliner Weisse from different breweries

Berlin has a long brewing tradition. The most common variety is Pilsener. Brands such as Schultheiss, Berliner Kindl and Berliner Pilsener are common. The wheat beer Berliner Weisse is drunk in summer as a Berliner Weiße mit Schuss with raspberry or woodruff syrup.

== Markets and shops ==
German bakeries offering a variety of breads and pastries are widespread. Europe's largest delicatessen market is found at the KaDeWe. 34,000 specialty and gourmet foods and beverages are stored there. Among the world's largest chocolate stores is Rausch.

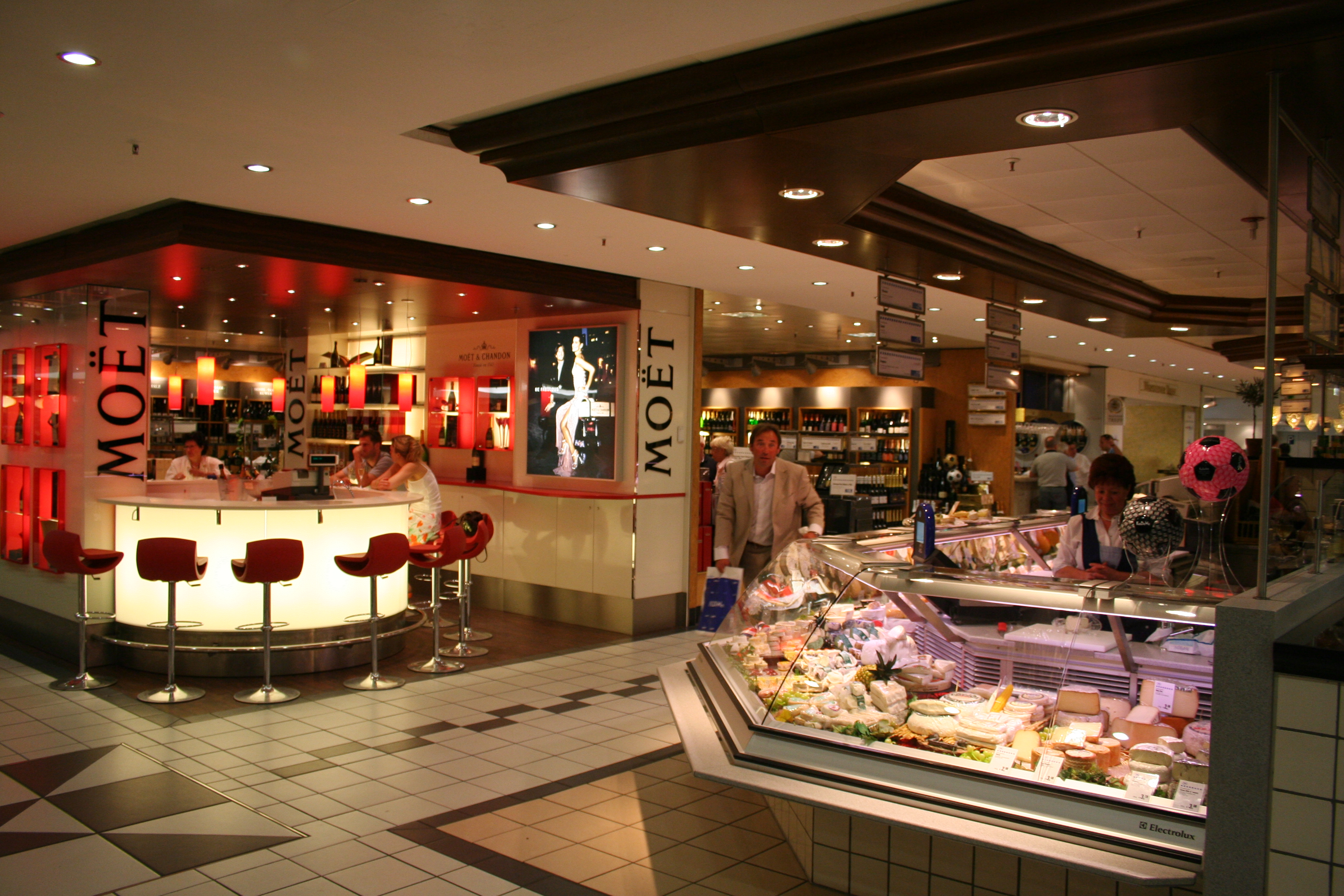
The 6th-floor food hall at Kaufhaus des Westens

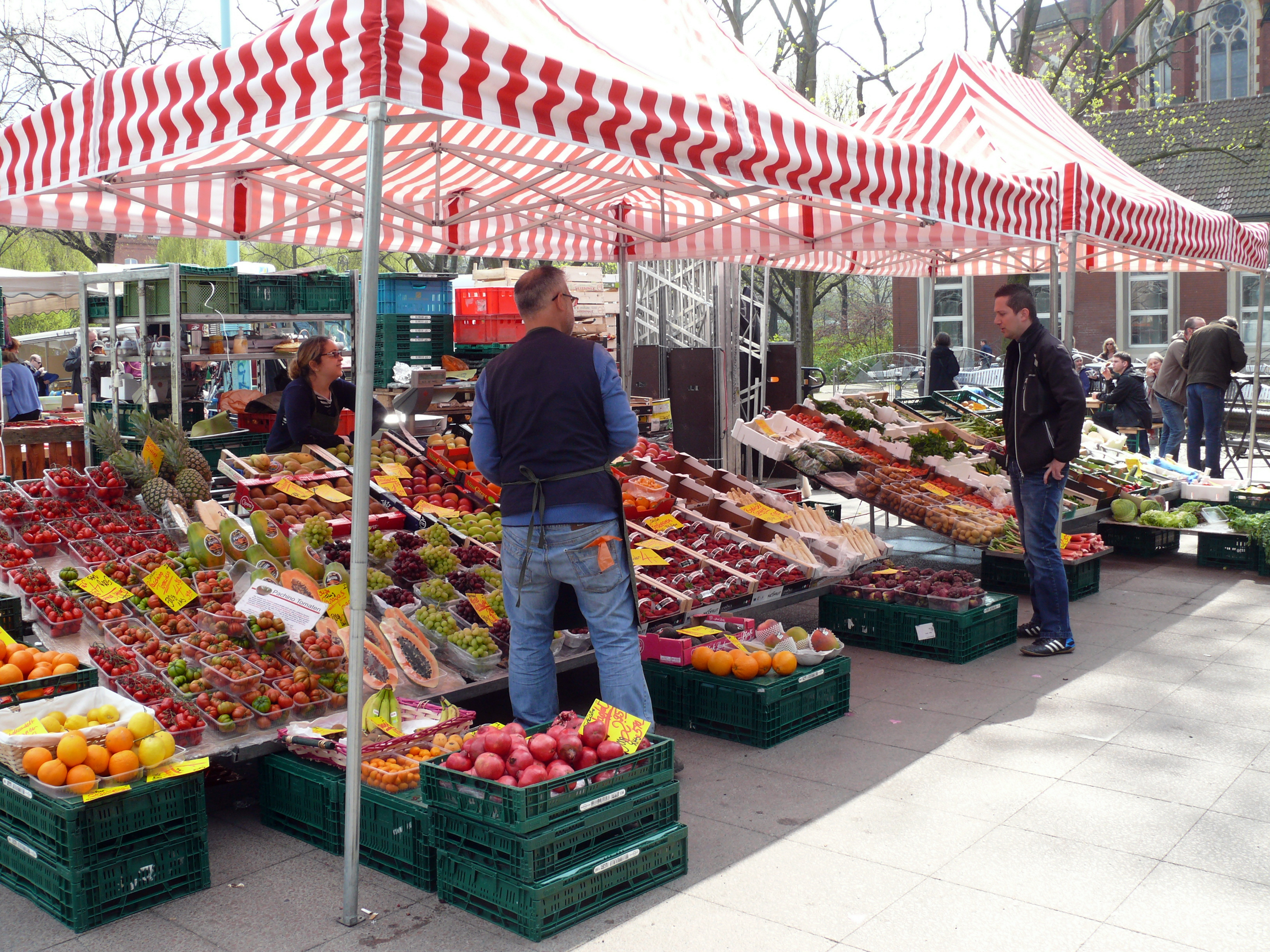
Winterfeldtplatz Market

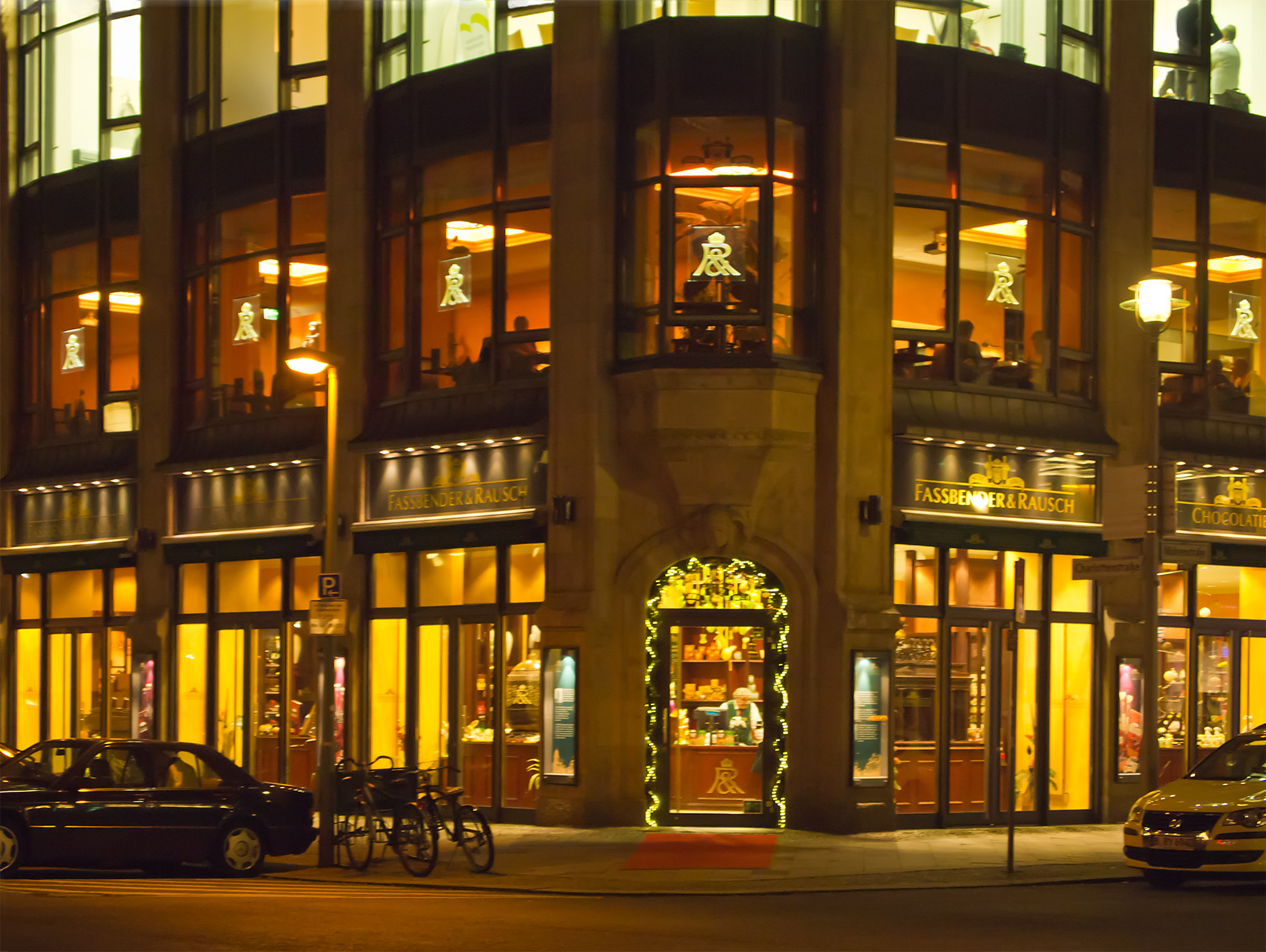
Fassbender und Rausch

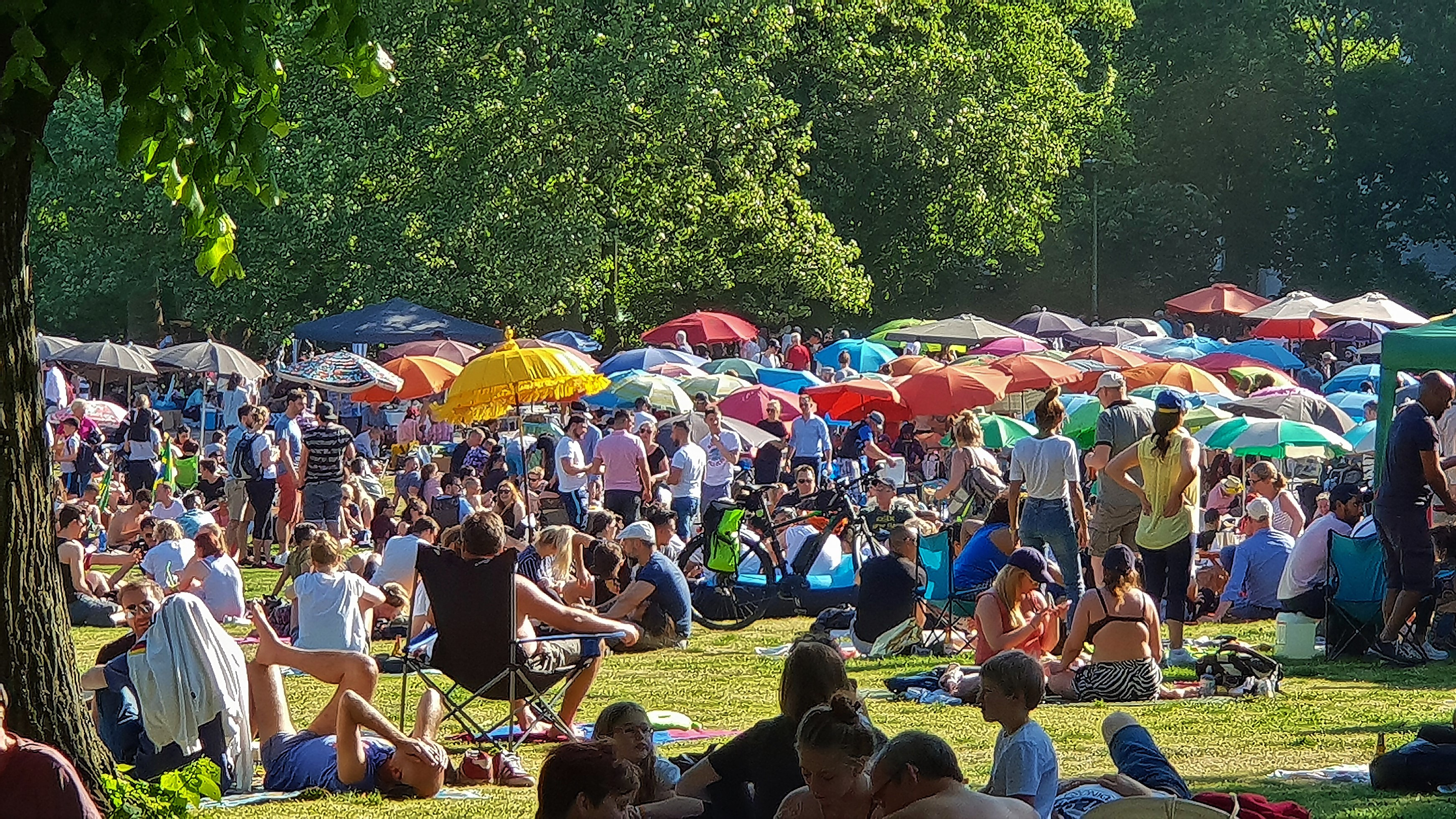
Thai Food Park

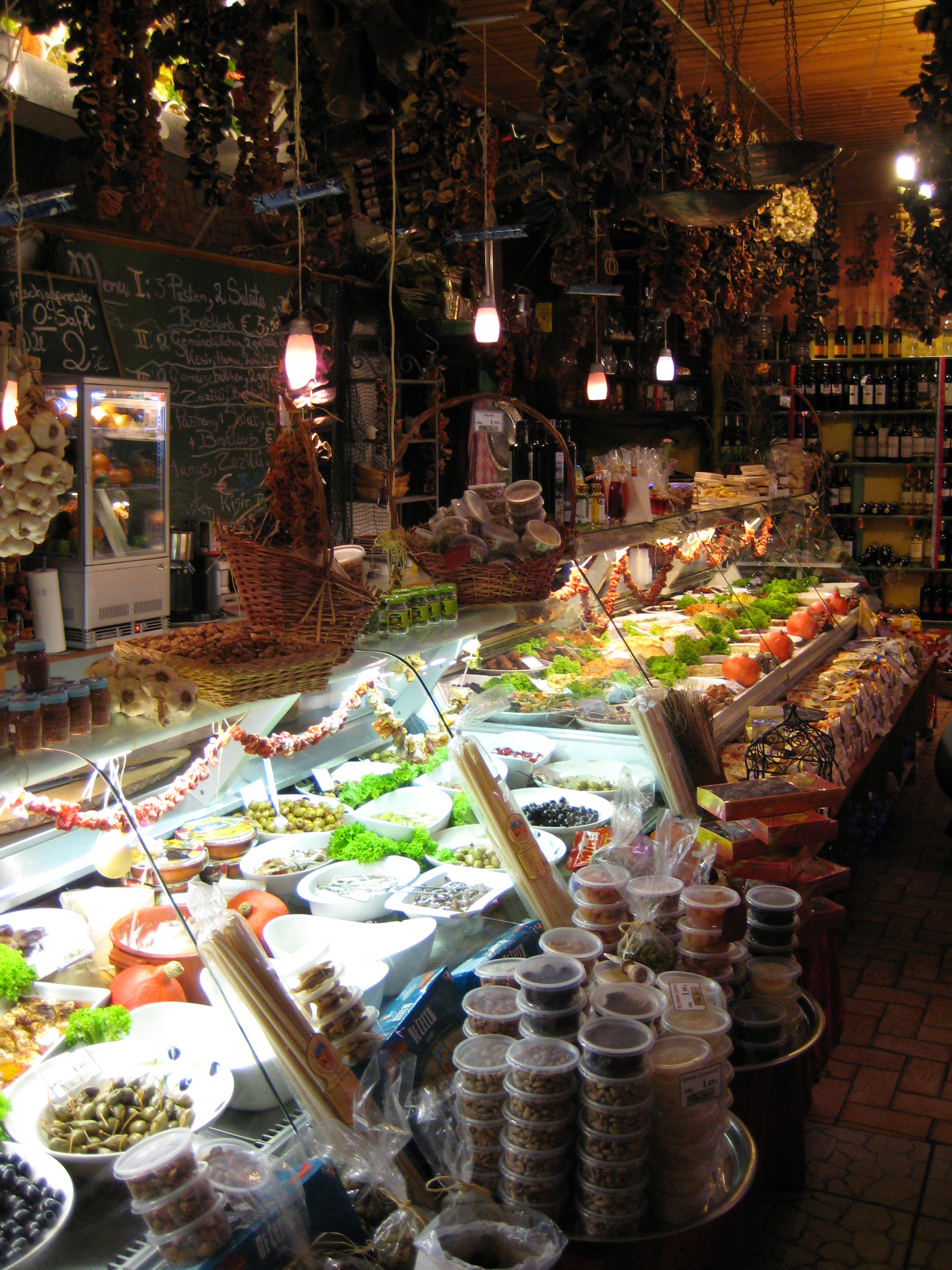
Delicatessen in Kreuzberg

== Restaurants and bars ==
Berlin is home to a diverse gastronomy reflecting the immigrant history of the city. Turkish, Arab, Vietnamese and many European immigrants brought their culinary traditions to the city. The modern fast-food version of the doner kebab sandwich which evolved in Berlin in the 1970s, has since become a favorite dish in Berlin elsewhere in the world. It is estimated, that more than 1,000 döner restaurants exist in Berlin alone. German pubs, Chinese, Thai, Indian, Korean, and Japanese restaurants, as well as Spanish tapas bars, Italian, and Greek cuisine, can be found in many parts of the city.

In 2017, there were a total of seven restaurants that were awarded two Michelin stars. Another 14 restaurants received a star. In 2017, Berlin was the city with the most star restaurants in German-speaking countries. Berlin is well known for its offerings of vegetarian and vegan cuisine and is home to an innovative food scene promoting cosmopolitan flavors, local and sustainable ingredients, pop-up street food markets, supper clubs, as well as food festivals, such as Berlin Food Week.

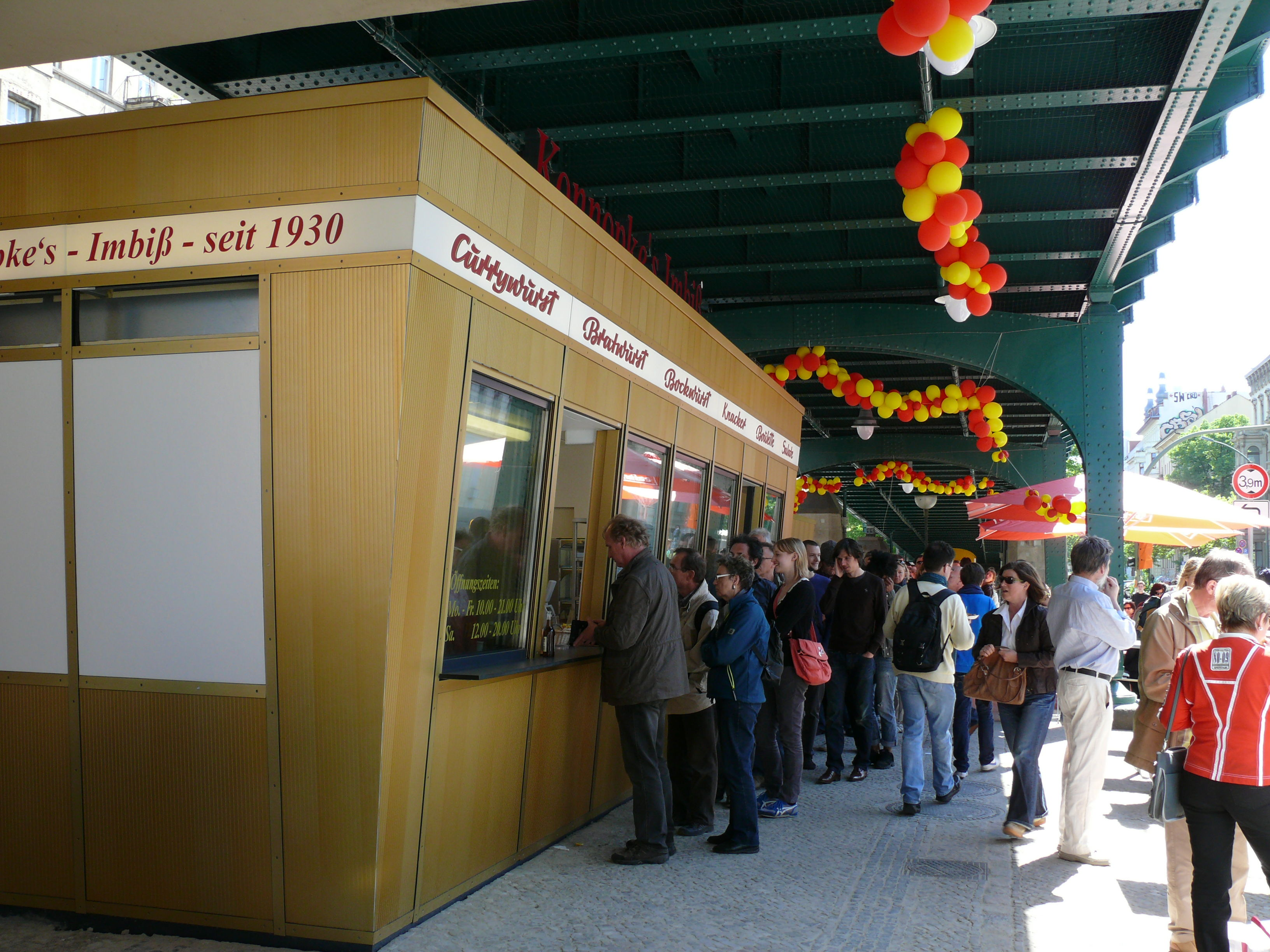
Konnopke Imbiss

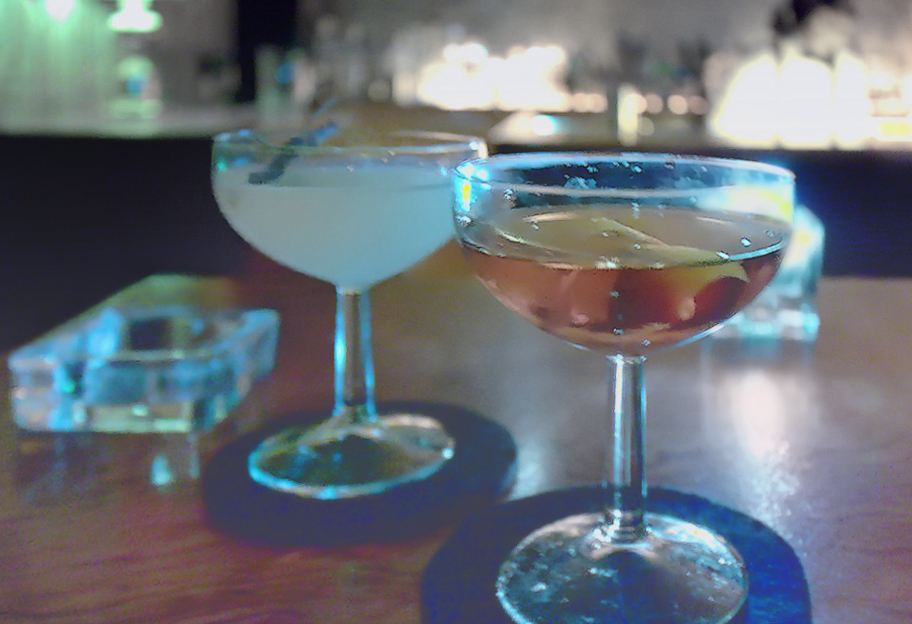
Cocktails at Reingold Bar

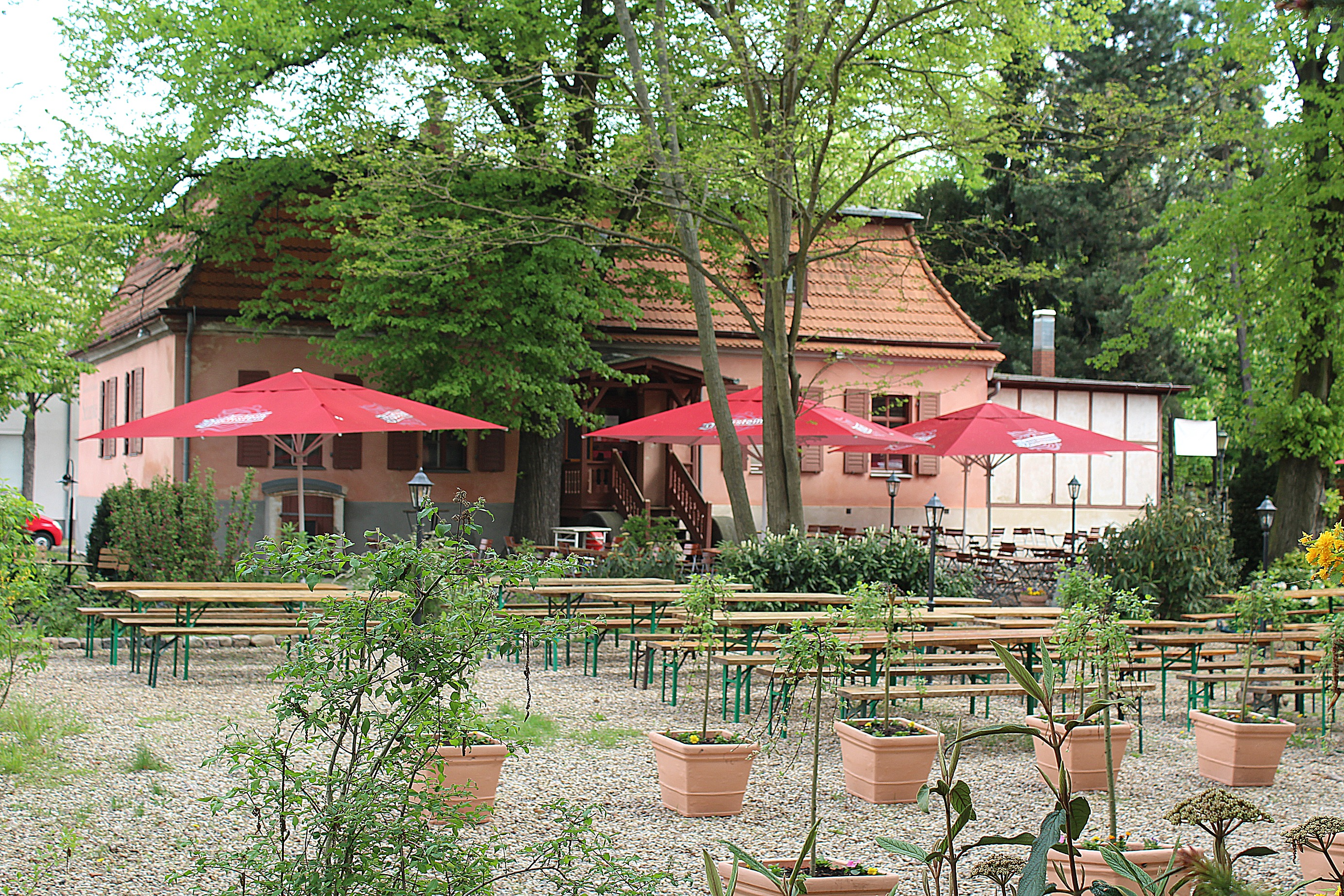
Restaurant and beergarden

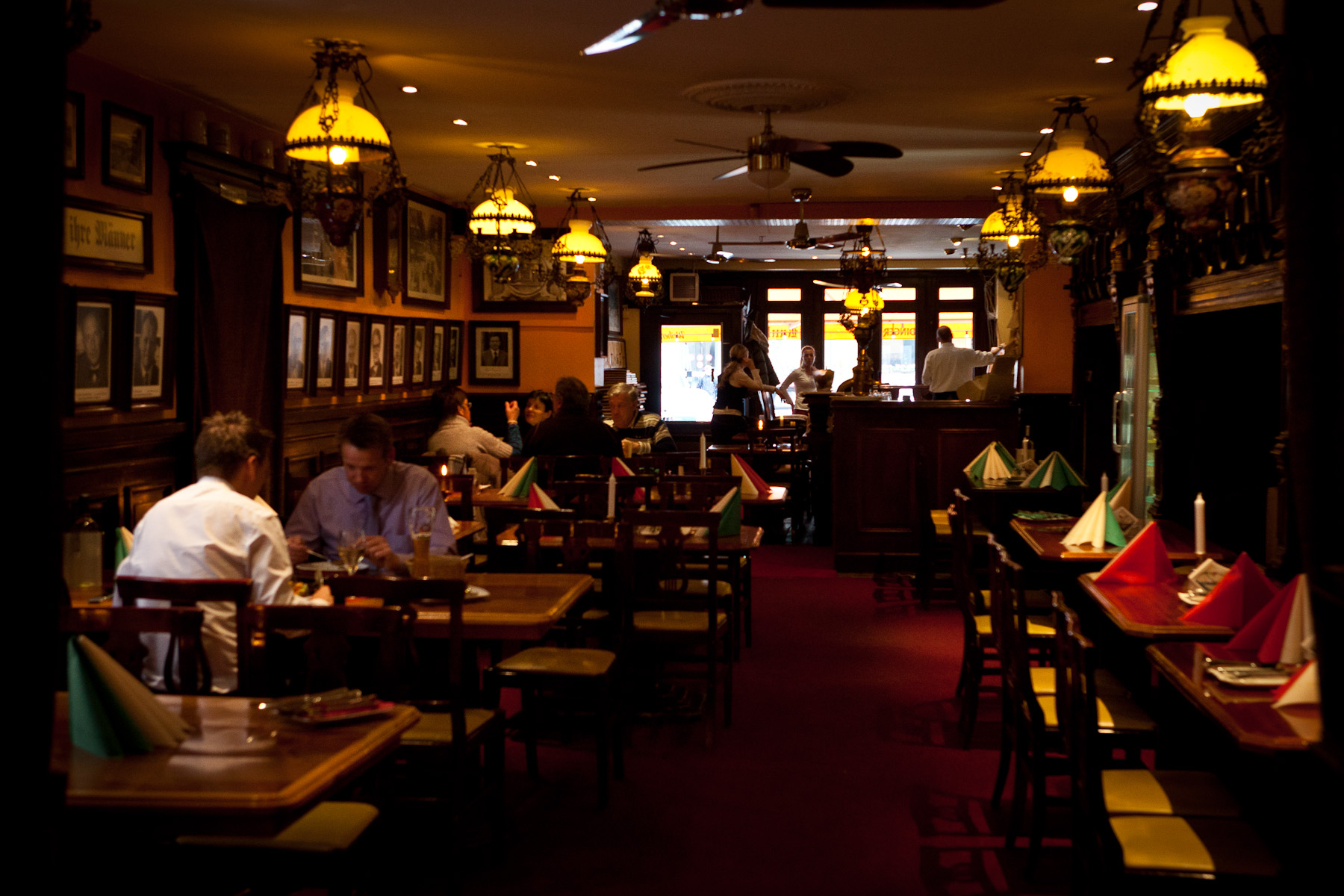
Berlin Restaurant

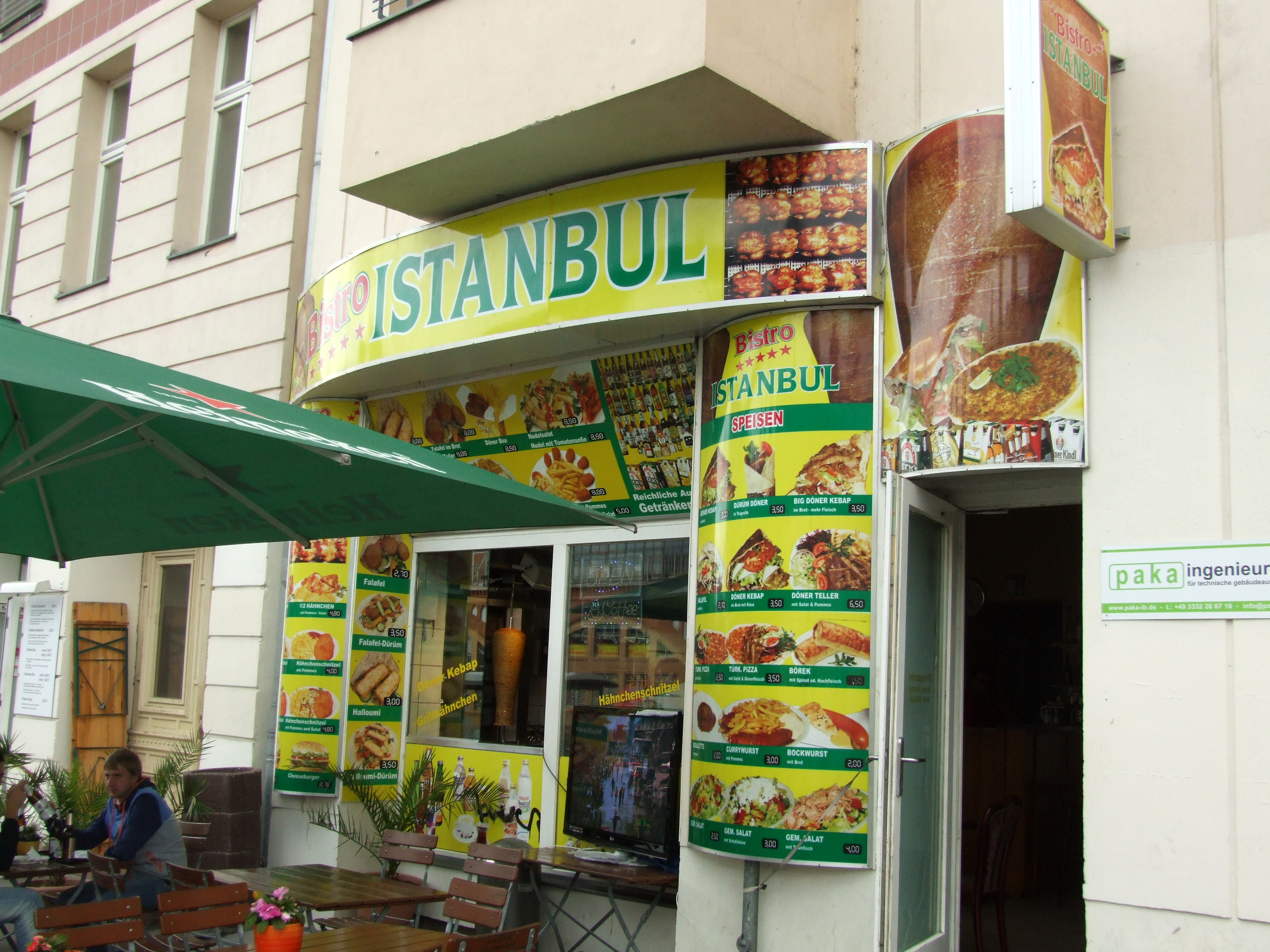
Döner Kebab eatery

== Holidays ==
On the Christmas Days following Christmas Eve, roasted goose is a staple of Christmas Day meals. The advent season is often associated with sweet and spicy foods like Weihnachts- or Christstollen and Lebkuchen. The Easter season, for instance, is typically associated with chocolate Easter eggs and Easter Bunnies. The preceding carnival season and New Years Eve is known for Pfannkuchen.

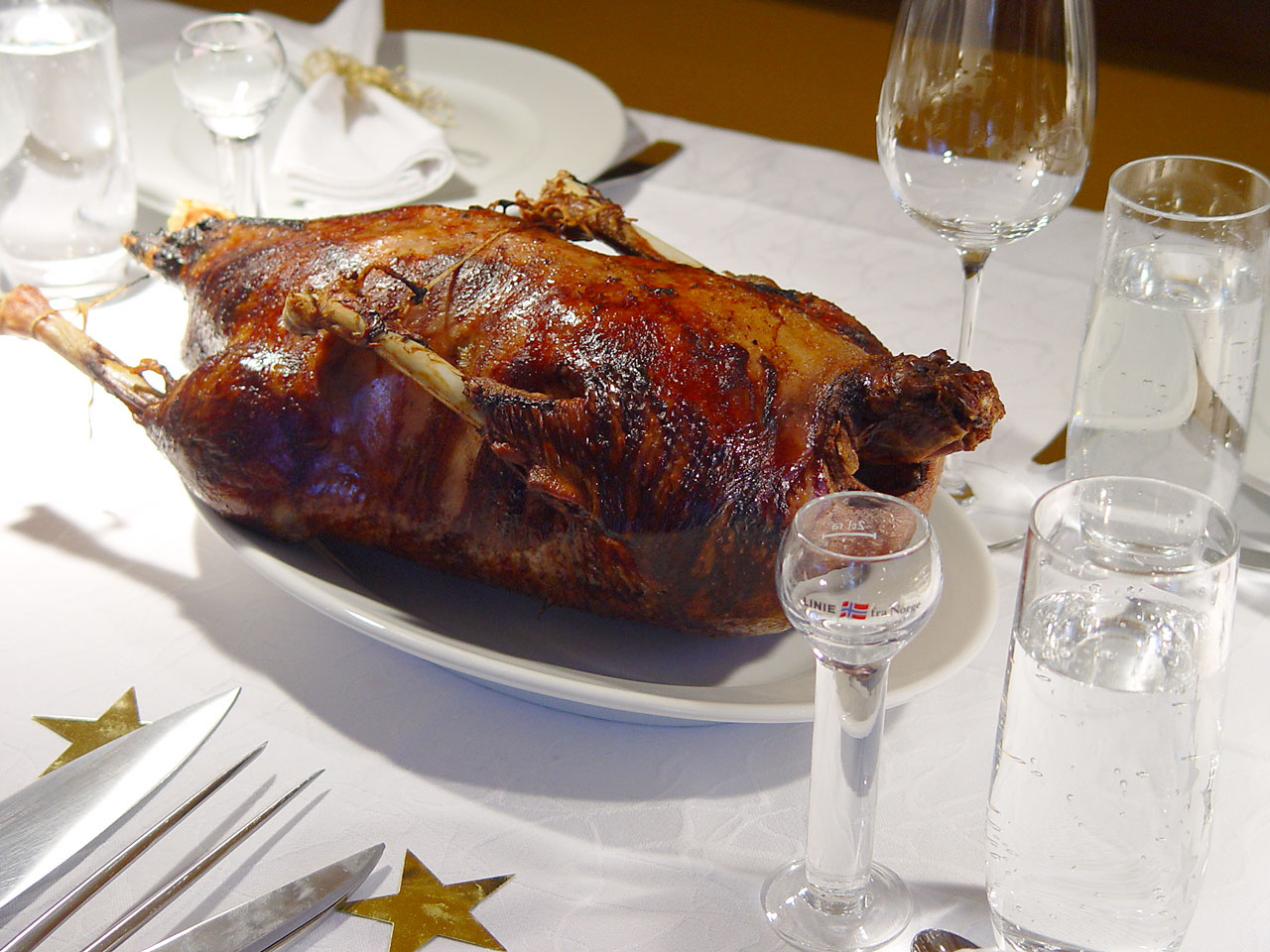
Roasted Christmas goose

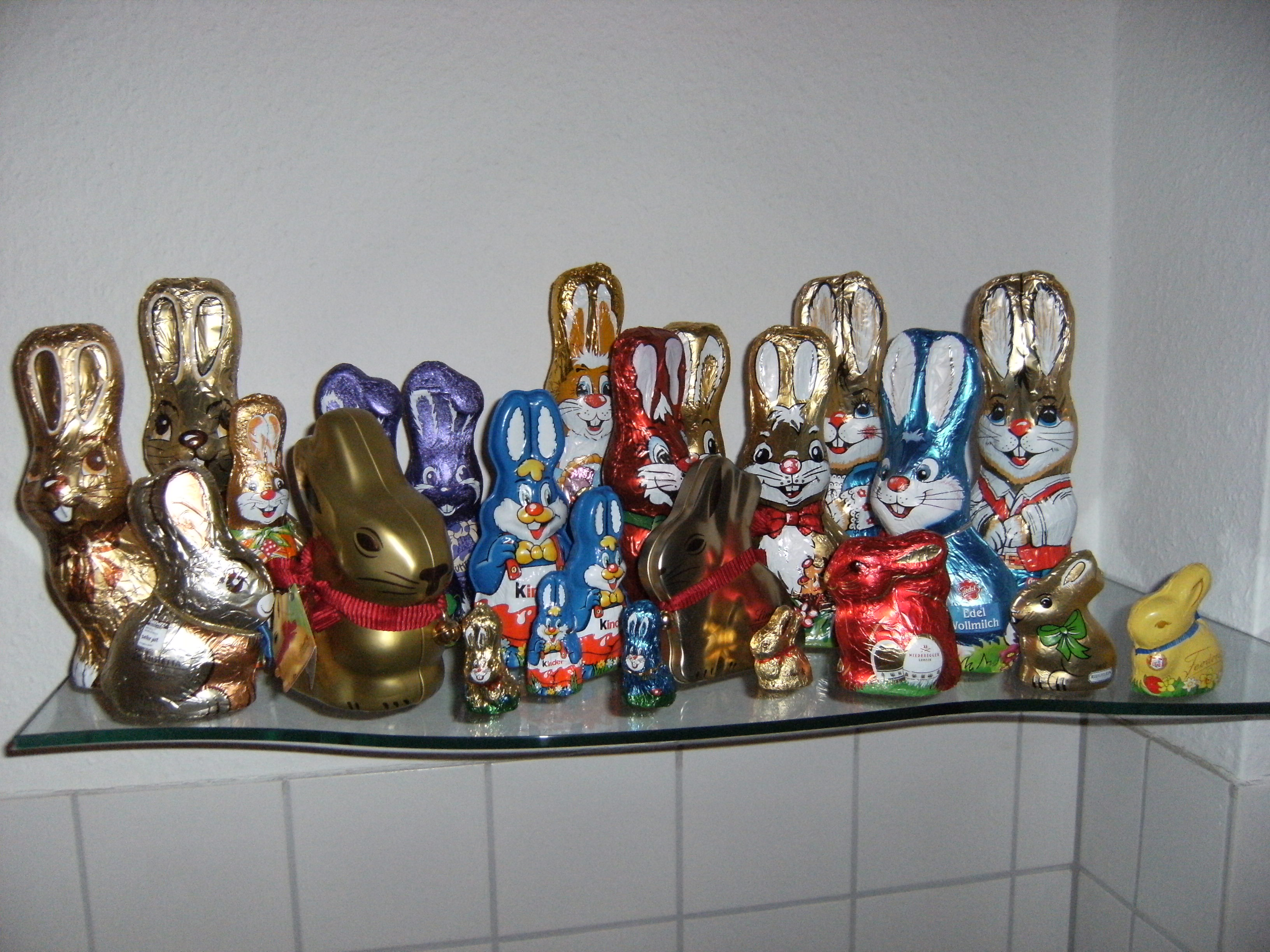
Chocolate Easter Bunny

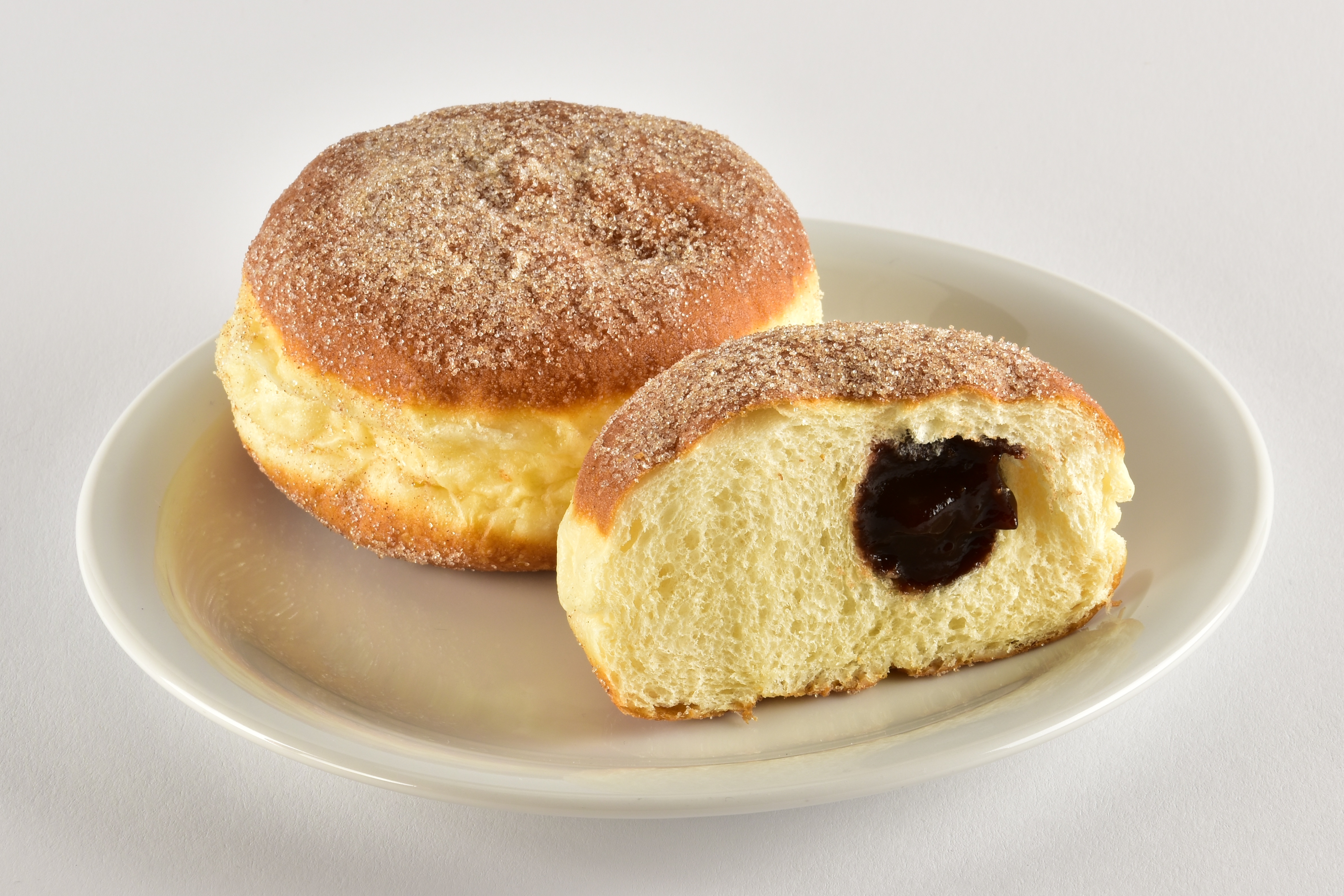
Berliner Pfannkuchen

== Companies and brands ==
- August Storck: Toffifee, Knoppers, Werther's Original
- Bio Company
- HelloFresh
- Delivery Hero
- Brauerei Lemke
- Veganz
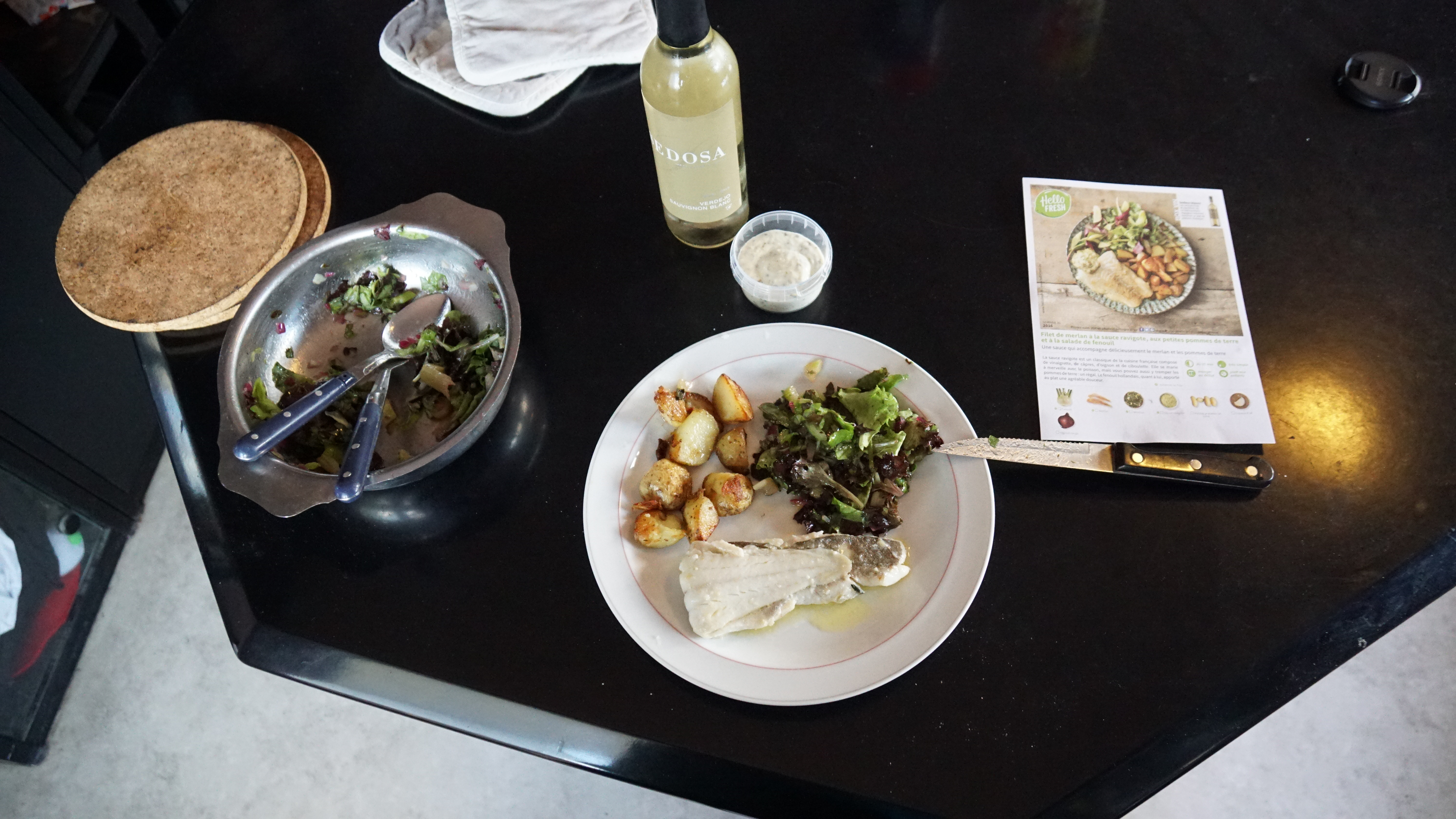
HelloFresh Meal

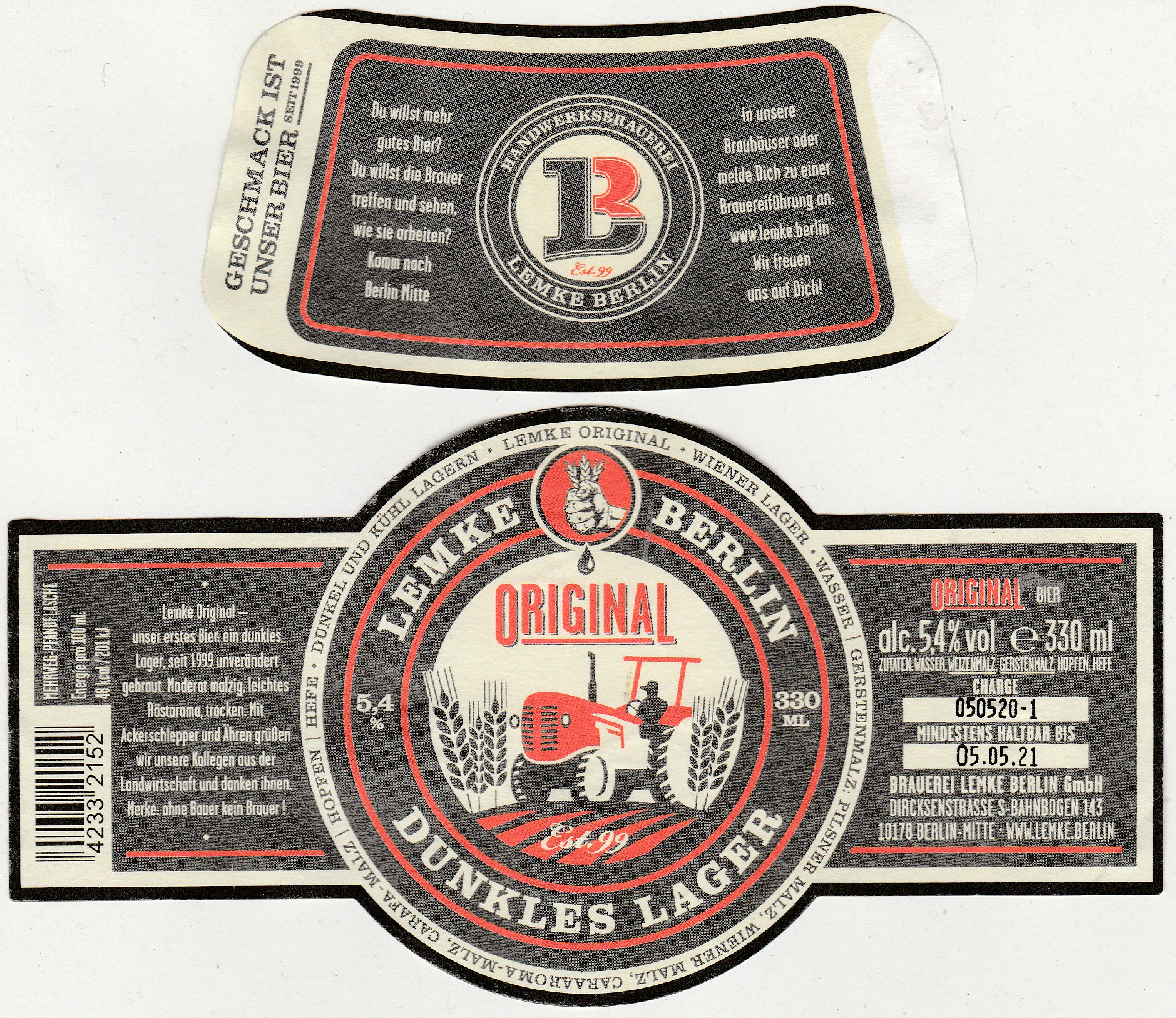
Lemke Beer

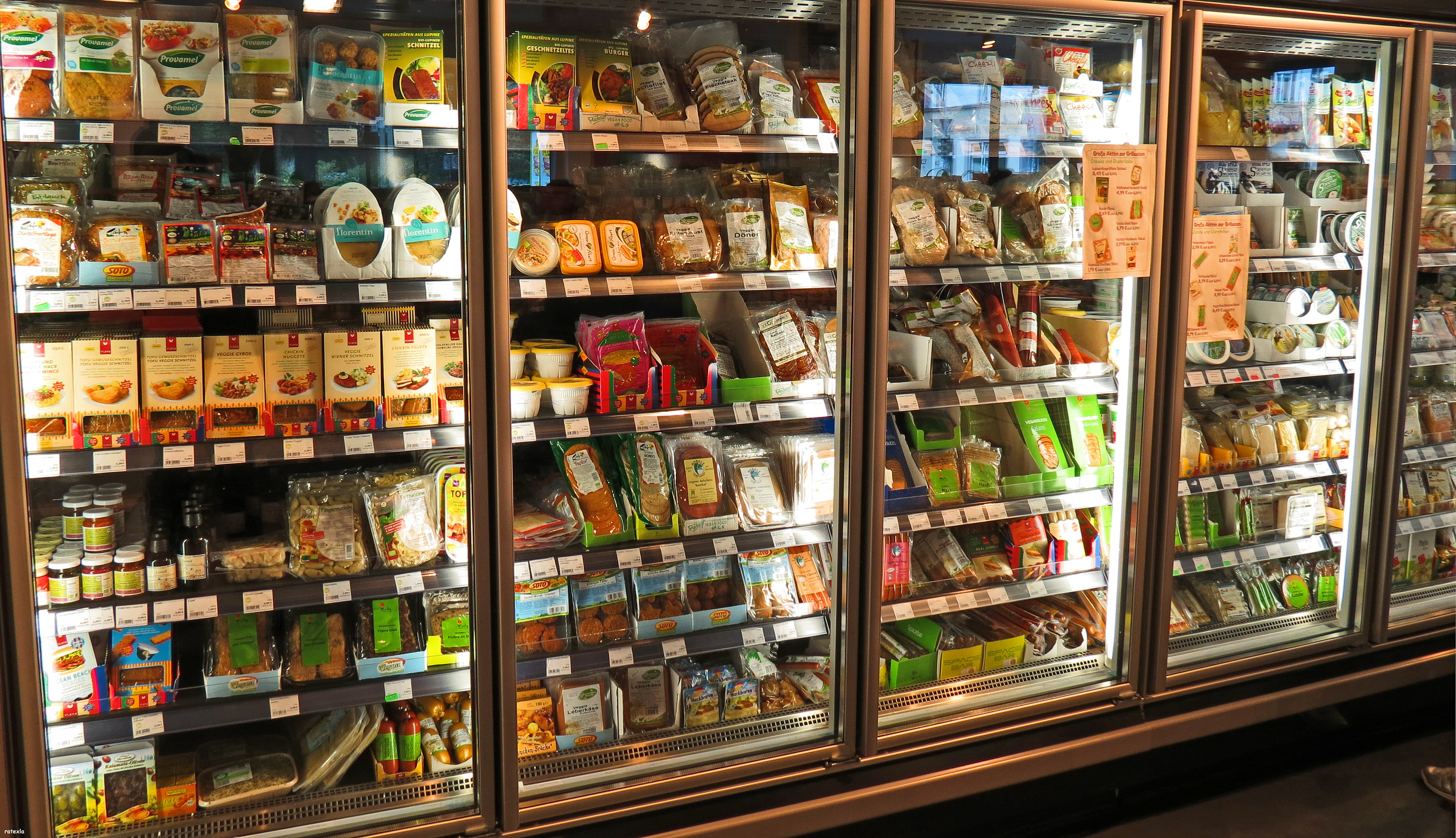
Veganz Store

== See also ==
- German cuisine
