= Spreewaldsauce =

German sauce eaten with fish

- Type: Sauce
- Region or state: Brandenburg and Berlin
- Main ingredients: Fish fond and bright roux
- Ingredients generally used: Butter, cream, parsley and dill
- Similar dishes: Béchamel sauce

Spreewaldsauce is a traditional thickened sauce used in the cuisines of Brandenburg and Berlin which is particularly eaten with fish such as eel, pike or zander. Even if it is very similar to the French Béchamel sauce, it is said that its recipe does not derive from the Huguenots but is of a much older and regional source.

To prepare the sauce, fish fond and bright roux are mixed and the emerging sauce is refined with butter, cream, parsley and dill. There are some variations and depending on the recipe one could also use flour mixed with cream instead of roux, add some bright beer or thickened with egg yolk.

== History ==
The famous German poet Theodor Fontane wrote about the Spreewaldsauce: "Das wäre kein Spreewaldsmahl, wenn kein Hecht auf dem Tisch stände, und das wäre kein Hecht, wenn ihn nicht die berühmte Spreewaldsauce begleitete, die mir wichtig genug erscheint, um hier das Rezept in seinen äußersten Umrissen folgen zu lassen. Das Geheimnis dieser Sauce ruht in der kurzen Formel: wenig Butter, aber viel Sahne." (It would not be a meal in the Spreewald if there wasn't a pike on the table and this would not be a pike if it wasn't accompanied by the famous Spreewaldsauce which seems important enough for me to outline its recipe here. The secret of this sauce is the short formula: little butter but an abundance of cream.)

== See also ==
- List of sauces
