= Brandenburg cuisine =

Culinary traditions of Brandenburg, Germany

The cuisine of Brandenburg, a region of Germany, is considered rather down-to-earth compared to other cuisines. Because many people in Brandenburg have Slavonic roots, the cuisine is very much influenced by their habits and customs, such as is the case in Mecklenburg and Pomerania.

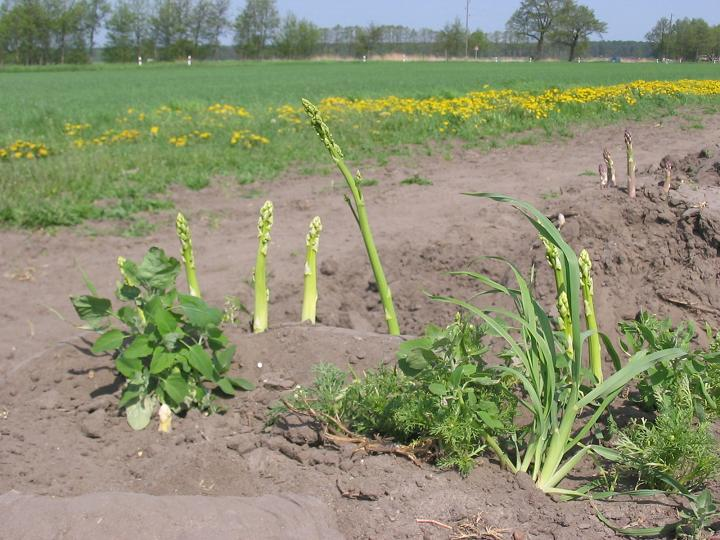
Beelitzer Spargel (asparagus from Beelitz)

== Fish ==
Due to the numerous greater and smaller inland lakes in Brandenburg its cuisine features much fish. Particularly pike, zander, eel and carp are very popular and are ingredients in many dishes. A very typical fashion of preparation is the combination with Spreewaldsauce.

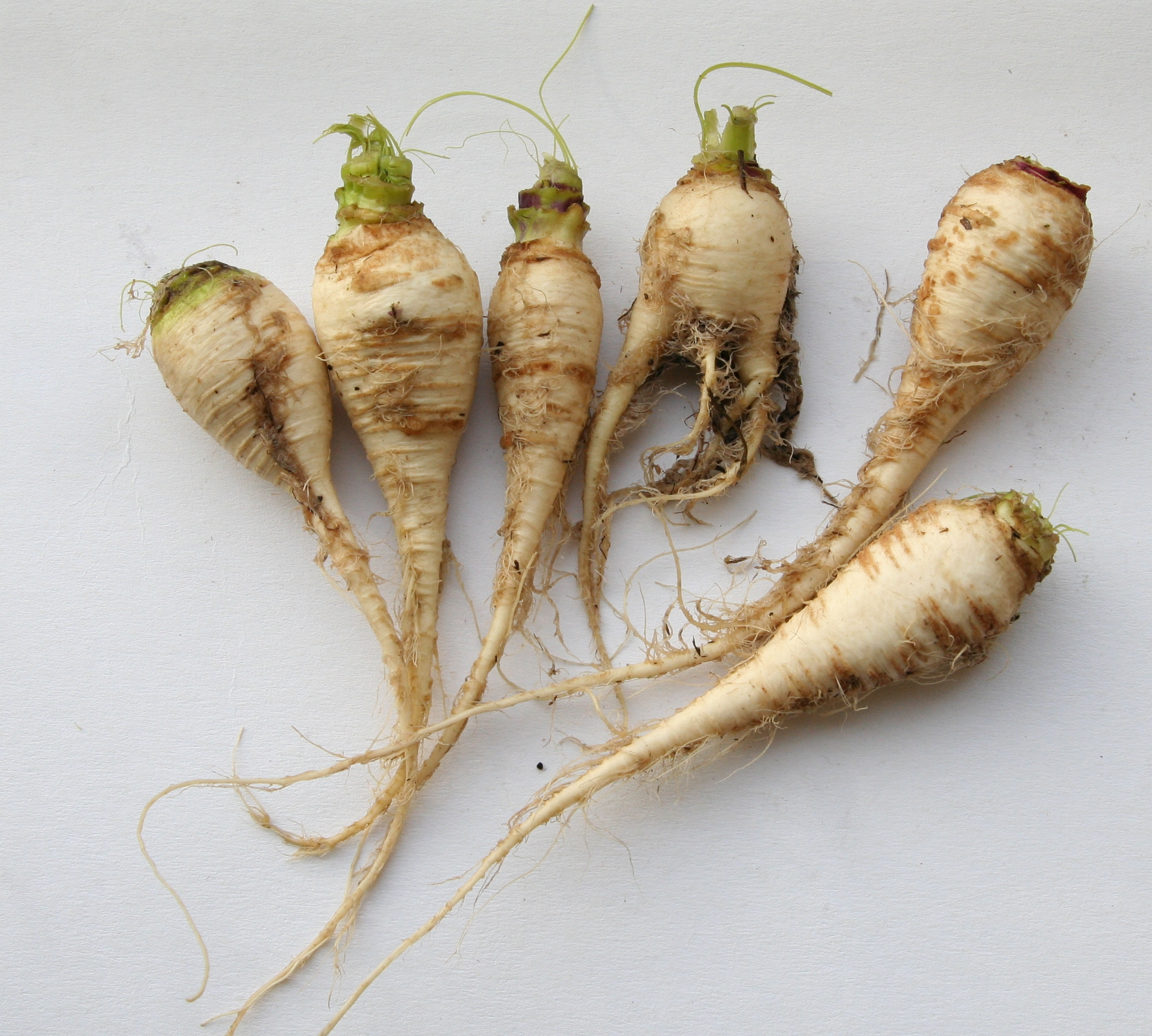
Teltower Rübchen

== Vegetables ==
Potato is an essential ingredient in the cuisine of Brandenburg since Frederick the Great encouraged its breakthrough through a royal decree. It is so important that some tourist activities are built around the potato and its importance for the population in Brandenburg, for example the tourist association of Fläming offers a "culinary potato tour" where the participants are guided to several inns which have innovative recipes containing potato on their menu.

Very famous and almost internationally known is the asparagus grown in the surroundings of Beelitz. Most of the yieldings are sold in the area and especially to Berlin where during the asparagus season many restaurants offer Beelitzer Spargel mit Kartoffeln und Sauce Hollandaise (asparagus with potatoes and hollandaise sauce).

== Game and mushrooms ==
In the forested areas of Brandenburg such as the Schorfheide, and in the regions of Niederlausitz Fläming many dishes are featuring game and mushrooms. In well-yielding years an abundance of chanterelles, chestnuts and boletus can be found in Brandenburg’s forests and therefore also on the menus of inns, guesthouses and restaurants.

== Regional specialities ==
A famous speciality food from the Spreewald region are the Spreewald gherkins, which are protected by the EU as a Protected Geographical Indication (PGI).

A very typical speciality of the region Niederlausitz are Plinsen, a kind of pancake. Also in this region linseed oil is extracted and used as an ingredient very frequently. For example, one of the most famous dishes is potato with Quark, shallots and linseed oil.

Another well-known dish which is also considered the "regional dish" of Priegnitz is Knieperkohl, a kind of pickled cabbage similar to Sauerkraut but containing not only white cabbage but also collard greens (or leaves of red cabbage), kale, and grape leaves and cherry leaves.

== Beverages ==
There are several breweries located in Brandenburg. The Klosterbrauerei Neuzelle produces a coloured black beer which was many years disputed about since the government of Brandenburg wanted to prosecute the brewery for selling and advertising it as black beer. A blossoming metropole of beer production was Bernau but the famous "Bernauer Bier" was last produced in Friedrichshagen, a district belonging to Berlin.

In the surroundings of the town Werder (Havel) many fruits are grown and processed to fruit vines. There are also several distilleries manufacturing fruit brandies.

== Literature ==
- Olaf Kappelt: Friedrich der Große - meine Koch- und Küchengeheimnisse, Berlin-historica Verlag, 2. Auflage, Berlin 2009, ISBN 978-3-939929-13-0
