= Berliner Pilsner =

German brand of beer

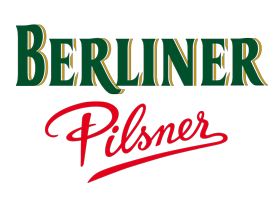
- Manufacturer: Berliner-Kindl-Schultheiss-Brauerei
- Origin: Berlin, Germany
- Introduced: 1902
- Alcohol by volume: 5.0%
- Website: www.berliner-pilsner.de

Berliner Pilsner is a beer produced in Berlin, Germany, by Berliner-Kindl-Schultheiss-Brauerei, a division of the Radeberger Group.

== History ==
Berliner Pilsner was created in 1902 by Gabriel and Richter as a small brewery with an adjacent beer garden. In 1969, Berliner Pilsner was nationalised and incorporated in the East German "VEB Berliner Getränkekombinat", a Volkseigener Betrieb (publicly owned corporation). For many years during communist rule, Berliner Pilsner was the leading beer brand in East Berlin. The beer was also exported to Bulgaria, USA, and the United Kingdom.

After German reunification in 1990, the brewery was divested and independently run. As part of a product relaunch in 1992, the shorter, older Euro-bottle was replaced with the more fashionable NRW-bottle, combined with a redesign, with the intention of creating a new image and regaining market share.

The brewery also invested in new technology to modernize the brewing process. Further changes to the design continued, including the adoption of the Longneck-bottle, with the inclusion of a bear (a symbol of the city of Berlin, also found on its coat of arms) in front of the Reichstag dome.

In 2003, it was acquired by Radeberger Group and merged with several other Berlin-area brewery holdings to form Berliner-Kindl-Schultheiss-Brauerei.
