= Berliner-Kindl-Schultheiss-Brauerei =

Brewery in Berlin, Germany

Berliner-Kindl-Schultheiss-Brauerei GmbH
- Location: Berlin, Germany
- Coordinates: 52°32′32″N 13°28′15″E
- Opened: 1842
- Annual production volume: 1.5 million hl (1.3 million US bbl)
- Employees: 560
- Parent: Radeberger Gruppe

Berliner-Kindl-Schultheiss-Brauerei GmbH is a brewery in Berlin, Germany, that produces Berliner Pilsner, Berliner Kindl, Schultheiss, and Berliner Bürgerbräu. Until 2004, it was part of the larger brewing company Brau & Brunnen, which was then purchased by Dr. August Oetker KG and integrated into the Radeberger Gruppe.

The firm traces its origins to the founding of Schultheiss in Berlin in 1842.

In 2017, the brewery produced 1.5 million hectolitres (1.3 million US beer barrels) of beer.
