= Hovebach =

River in Germany

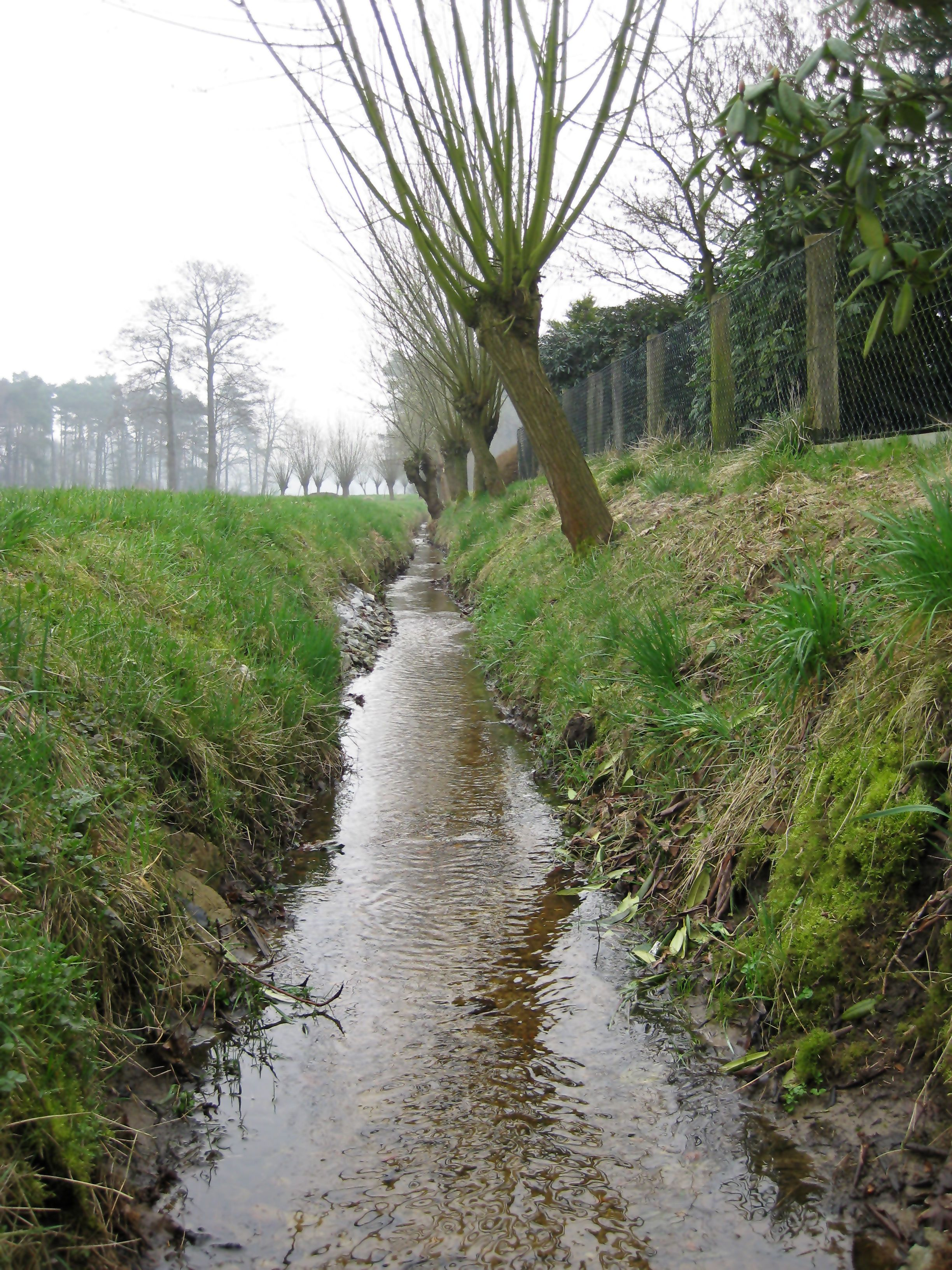

Location
- Country: Germany
- States: North Rhine-Westphalia

Physical characteristics
- Mouth
  - location: Abrocksbach
  - coordinates: 51.9861°N 8.3274°E

Basin features
- Progression: Abrocksbach→ Ems→ North Sea

Hovebach is a small river of North Rhine-Westphalia, Germany. It is 6.4 km long and flows into the Abrocksbach near Steinhagen.

== See also ==
- List of rivers of North Rhine-Westphalia
