= Holsten Pils =

Brand of lager

Holsten Pils is a brand of lager, a pilsner, brewed in Northampton by Carlsberg Group.

It was derived from the German Holsten Pilsener, also called Holsten Pils informally, which continues to be brewed in Hamburg (northern Germany).

== History ==
Holsten Brewery was founded in Altona (now a district of Hamburg) in 1879. The pilsner variety was first developed in 1953.

Carlsberg bought Holsten Brewery (Holsten-Brauerei AG) in 2004 for around 300 million euros.

== Production ==
The British product contains water, malted barley, hops and glucose syrup. The German original does not contain glucose syrup, which would be contrary to the German law of purity. It is 5% alcohol by volume.

Production of Holsten Pils began in Northampton on Tuesday 1 November 2005.

In May 2006 Carlsberg launched a draught version of Holsten Pils in a 30-litre keg. Each can has the motto Pure Brewing Excellence.

== See also ==
- Beer in England
- Beer in Germany
