= Konig's Westphalian Gin =

German brand of Steinhäger gin

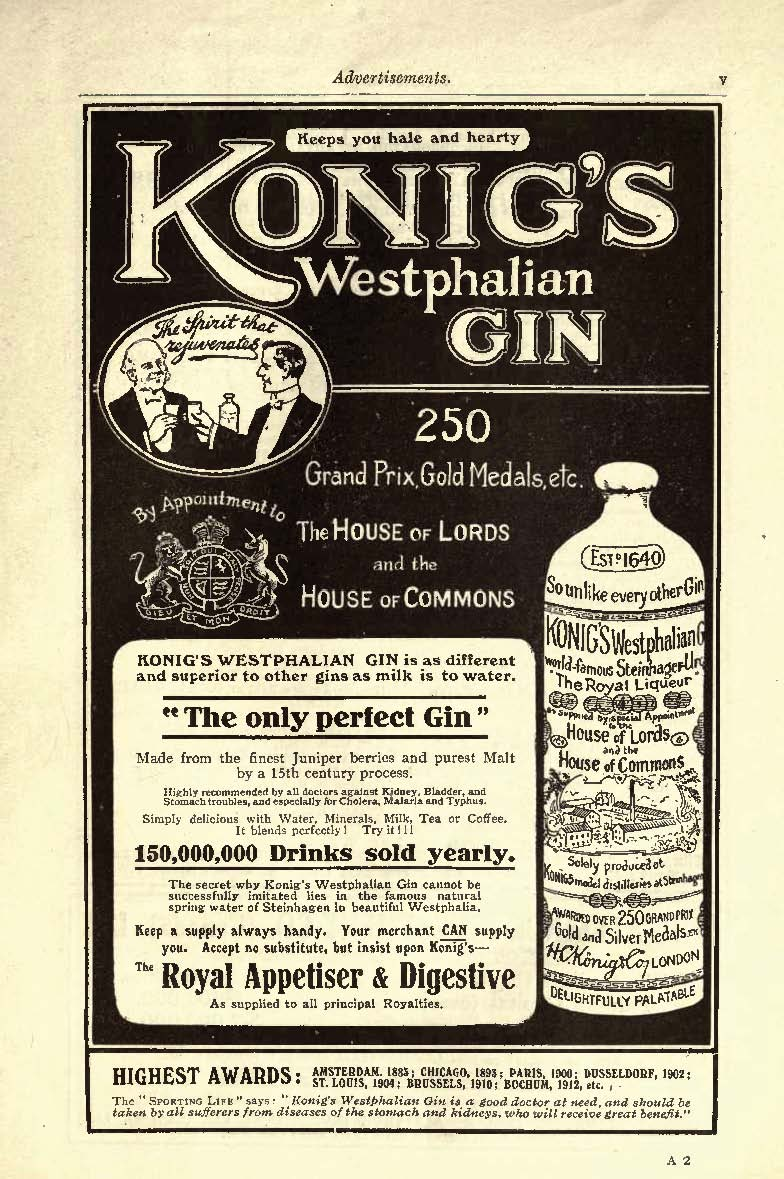
Advertising in the Royal Colonial Institute Year Book 1913.

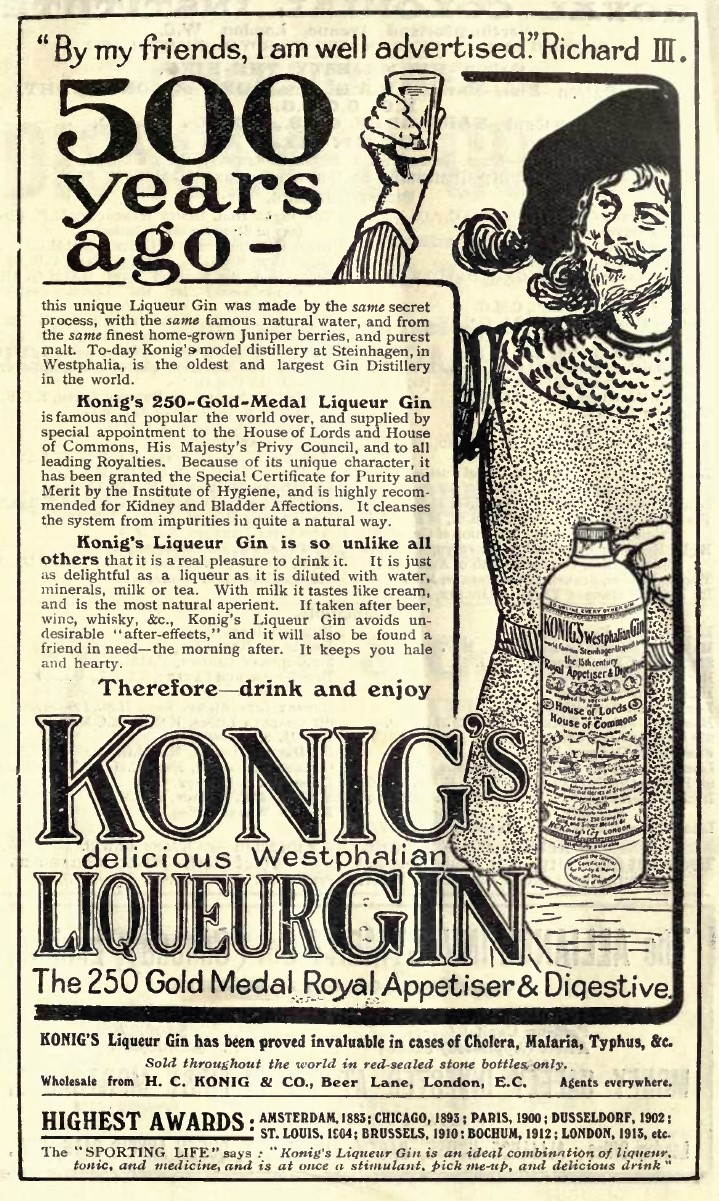
Advertising in the Royal Colonial Institute Year Book 1914.

Konig's Westphalian Gin was a Steinhäger gin produced up to the early part of the twentieth century from malt, juniper berries and mineral water at H. C. König's distillery in Steinhagen, Westphalia, Germany. Steinhäger was first produced in 1640.

== Background ==
By an edict of 1688, the "Great Elector" Frederick William of Brandenburg, in his capacity as Count of Ravensberg, granted the inhabitants of Steinhagen the exclusive privilege to distil alcohol and the area is still known for its Steinhäger gins (wacholder), distilled from crushed, fermented, juniper berries from the bushes of that plant that grow on the slopes of the nearby Teutoburg Forest. In the nineteenth century around twenty companies produced the spirit. Only gins distilled near Steinhagen can legally be called Steinhäger gins.

== Marketing ==
Since Konig's gin was much like other Steinhäger gins, it sought to differentiate itself from its competitors through exaggerated advertising slogans.

The gin claimed unlikely medicinal benefits under the slogan, "The Spirit that rejuvenates". Other such slogans included "The only perfect gin", "The Royal Liqueur" and "The Royal Appetiser & Digestive". Its advertising included the obviously spurious claim that it was "highly recommended by all doctors against kidney, bladder and stomach troubles and especially for cholera, malaria and typhus".

In common with other contemporary gins, König's was sold in tall stoneware (steingut) bottles, and Konig's was given a red seal in an attempt to make it distinctive. The gin was widely advertised in yearbooks of the period such as The Stage Year Book and the Royal Colonial Institute Year Book and in magazines like The English Illustrated Magazine.

Konig's gin has been marketed in Germany as "Steinhäger-Urquell" ("urquell" translates as "original source" or "wellspring", as with the beer Pilsner Urquell), in an effort to establish a claim as the original and authentic Steinhäger gin.

=== Claim of Royal warrant ===
The firm's advertising said that the gin was supplied to the British House of Commons and House of Lords, and it claimed that the firm held a royal warrant of appointment.

=== Claim of awards ===
König boasted that the spirit had over 250 Grand Prix and gold medals from trade fairs. The company's gins and liqueurs were shown at the World's Columbian Exposition (The Chicago World's Fair) of 1893.

== H.C. König ==
The firm's British wholesaler was located at Beer Lane, London E.C.

== See also ==
- König Brauerei (a different firm)
- List of gin brands
