= Jever Brewery =

Brewery in Friesland in Lower Saxony, Germany

Friesisches Brauhaus zu Jever
- Interactive map of Friesisches Brauhaus zu Jever
- Location: Jever, Germany
- Coordinates: 53°34′34″N 7°54′07″E
- Opened: 1848
- Annual production volume: 1.09 million hectolitres (930,000 US bbl) in 2015
- Owner: Radeberger Group
- Parent: Oetker Group

Active beers
| Name | Type |
| Pilsener | Pilsener |
| Fun | Non-alcoholic |
| Fun Biermix Zitrone | Non-alcoholic mixed beer drink with lemon |
| Light | Light beer |
| Lime | mixed beer drink with lime |

Seasonal beers
| Name | Type |
| Maibock | bock beer 7,4% vol. alcohol |

Jever is a German beer brand, named after the town of Jever where it is brewed. It has been brewed by the "Friesisches Brauhaus zu Jever" (the Jever Frisian Brewery) since 1848.

== History ==
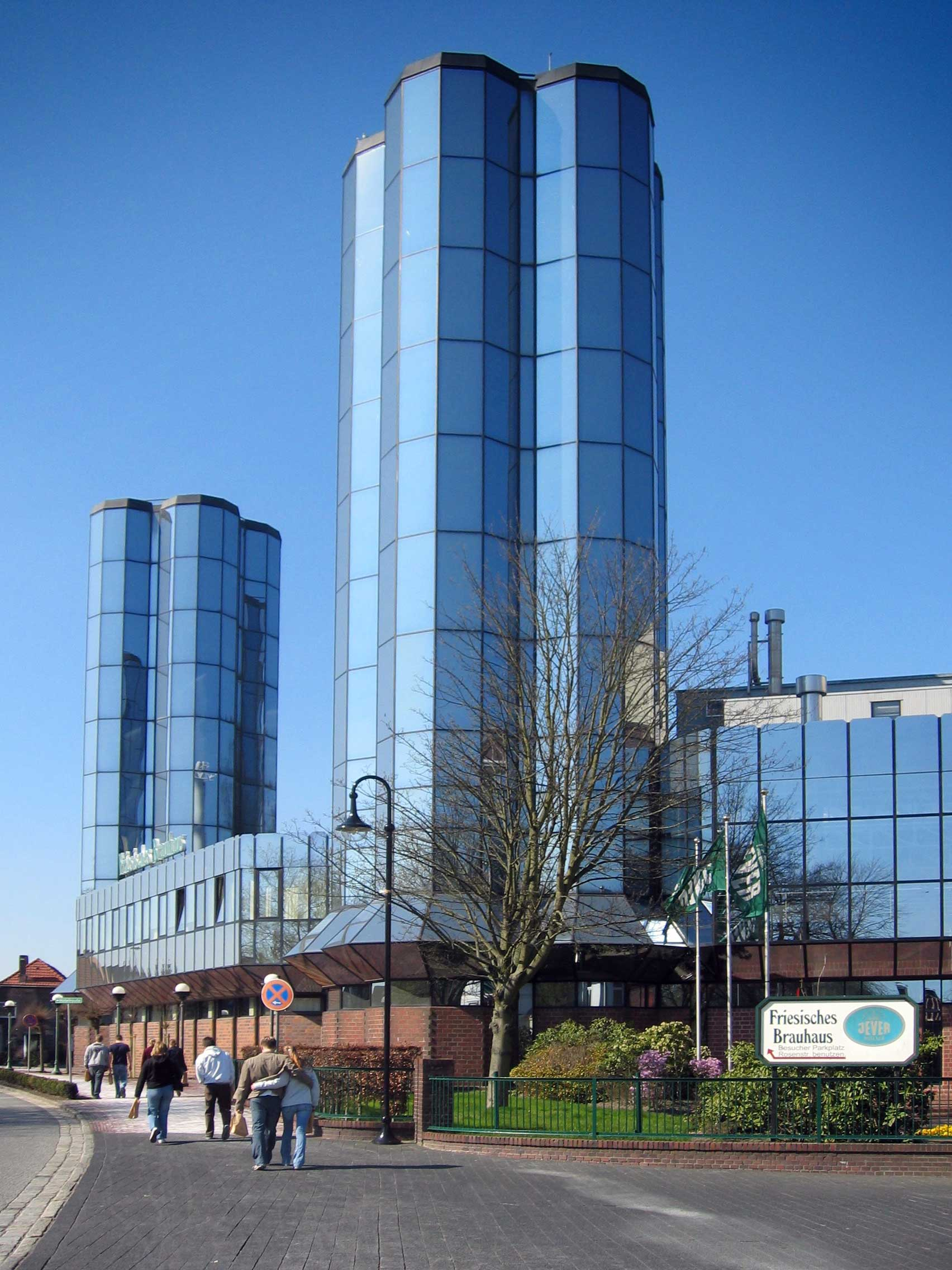
The Jever Friesian Brewery

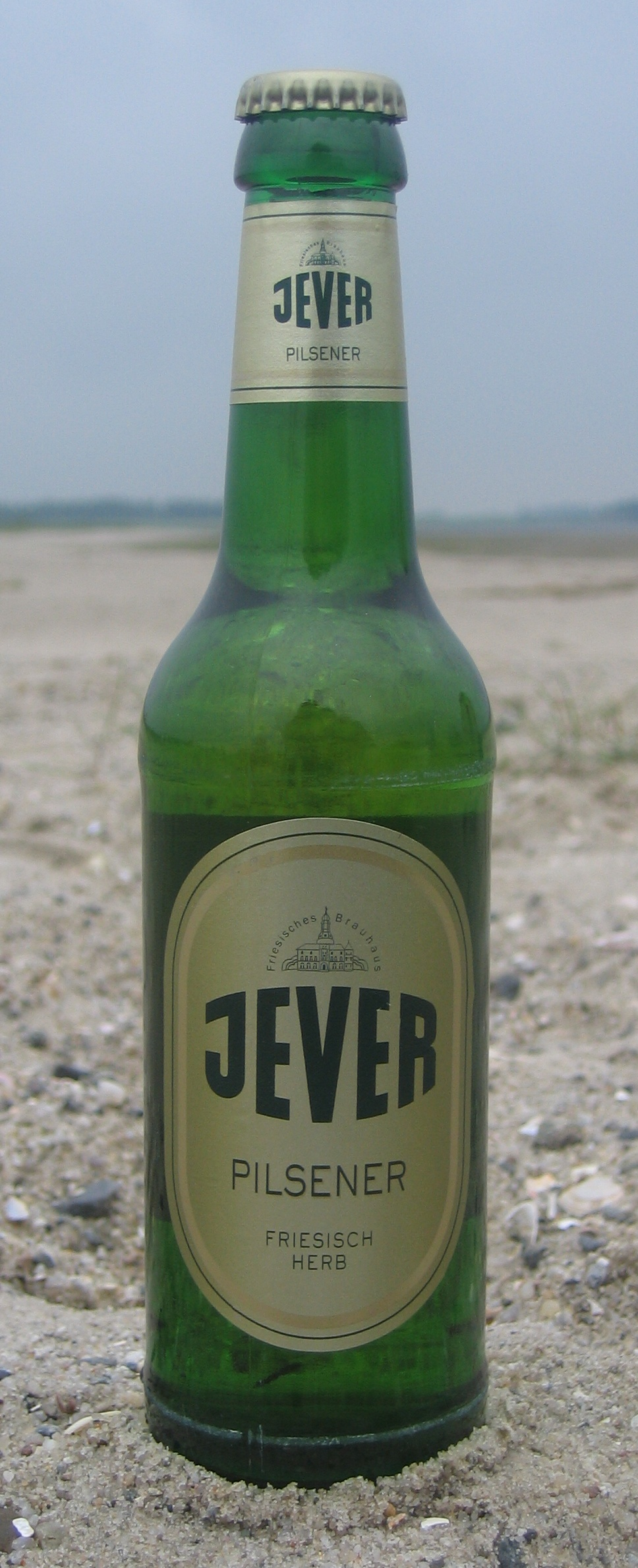
A bottle of Jever

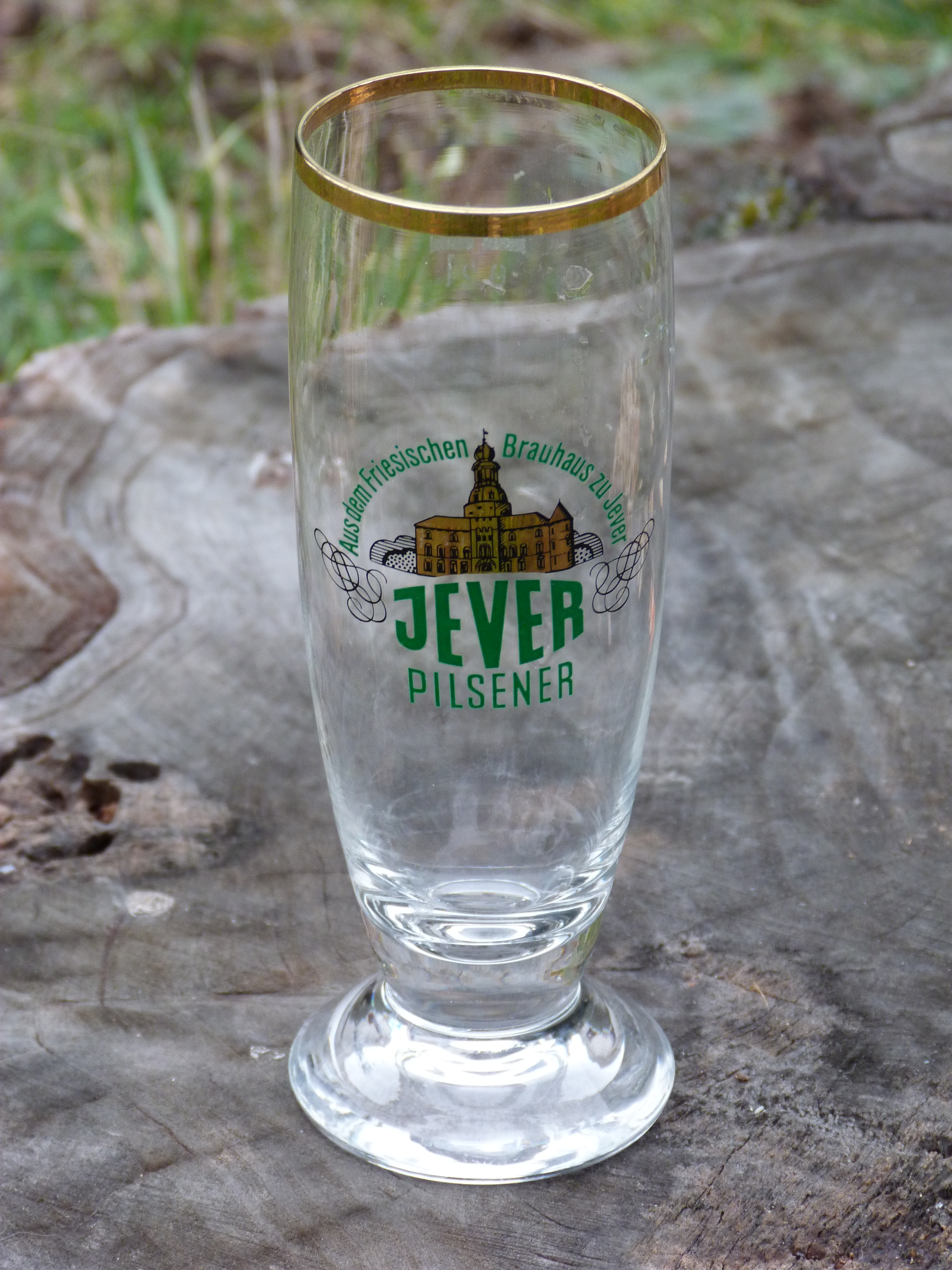
Jever beer glass

When the "Friesisches Brauhaus zu Jever" was founded by Diedrich König in 1848, it was only one of several breweries in the region. König, however, was convinced from the beginning that his beer was something special. After his death in 1867, his son sold the brewery. Theodor Fetköter took over the brewery. He began by developing the small family business into a large brewery operation, started to advertise and developed special bottles. In 1848, he played an important part in installing the first water supply system in Jever.

The First World War was a difficult time for the brewery. Theodor Fetköter's son, who had taken over the business, was killed at the front. The brewery was sold once again, in 1922, to the Bavaria – St. Pauli Brewery, based in Hamburg. Today the Bavaria – St. Pauli Brewery is owned by the Danish Carlsberg Group. By then, beer from Jever had become known outside the region where it was produced. Since 1934, it has been sold under the name "Jever Pilsener".

After World War II, the brewery once again found itself experiencing difficult times. Due to a fuel shortage, beer could only be sold from the brewery gates directly to customers. It was also necessary to scour the region's farms for malt.

After the post-war period, the situation in Jever improved once again. The top-selling beer was "Jever Export", which was brewed until 1990. During the 1960s, Pilsener beer became more and more popular and sales figures for Jever Pilsener increased. During this period the brewery was expanded.

Since 1994, the brewery has belonged to the Dortmunder Brau und Brunnen Group, which was acquired by Radeberger Group, at the beginning of 2005.

== Sponsorships ==
From 2002 to 2005, professional football club Borussia Mönchengladbach was sponsored by Jever.
