= Rudolf Weber-Arena =

Multi-purpose arena in Oberhausen, Germany

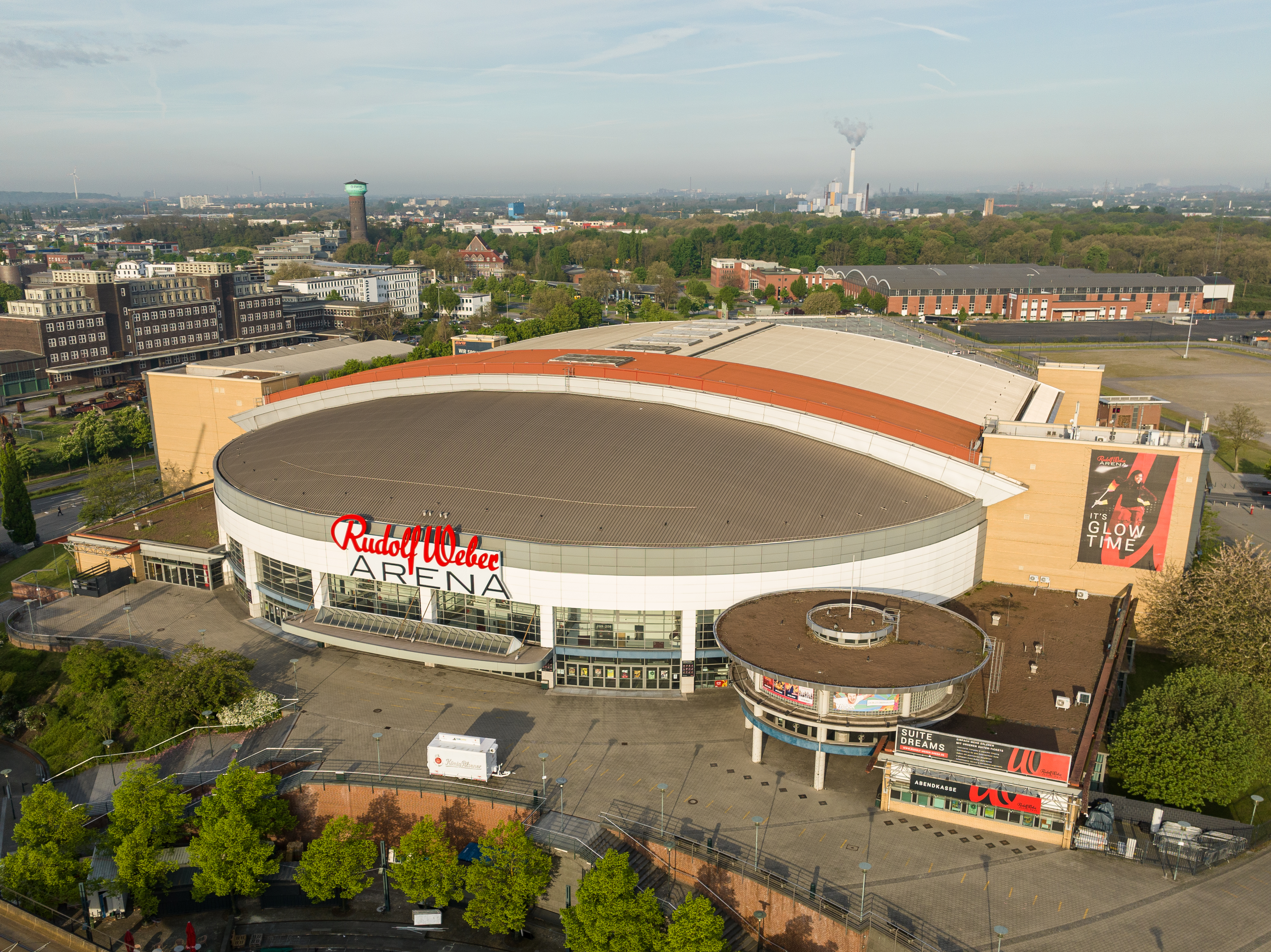
- Interactive map of Rudolf Weber-Arena
- Former names: CentrO Arena (planning/construction); Arena Oberhausen (1996–2001); König-Pilsener-Arena (2001-2021)
- Location: Oberhausen, North Rhine-Westphalia
- Coordinates: 51°29′24″N 6°52′19″E
- Owner: Michel industries
- Operator: property management
- Capacity: 12,650

Construction
- Groundbreaking: 17 July 1995
- Opened: 8 September 1996
- Cost: €45 million
- Architect: Ellerbe Becket
- Project manager: baa projektmanagement
- Structural engineer: Bingham Cotterell

Tenant
- Revierlöwen Oberhausen (DEL) (1996–2002)

Website
- www.koenig-pilsener-arena.de

The Rudolf Weber-Arena (originally the Arena Oberhausen) is a multipurpose arena, located in Oberhausen, Germany. Opening in September 1996, the arena is a part of the leisure and shopping center, CentrO. The venue was built in Neue Mitte Oberhausen, a former industrial plant.

In November 2001, König Brauerei, a brewery in Duisburg, purchased naming rights to the arena which took effect from January 2002. In December 2021, the arena's naming rights were purchased by Essen-based cleaning company Rudolf Weber GmbH.

== Configuration ==
The maximum capacity of the arena is 12,650, where the seating is arranged on two levels. It is also possible to have a center stage configuration, 12,000 people can attend such events. There are also two possible theatre configurations with 3,000 and 5,200 capacity, respectively.

== Naming history ==
- Arena Oberhausen (12 September 1996—31 December 2001)
- König-Pilsener-Arena (1 January 2002—31 December 2021)
- Rudolf Weber-Arena (1 January 2022—present)

== Events ==
The arena hosts a wide variety of events, with more than 800,000 people attending about a hundred events. The arena also hosts a variety of shows, e.g. Stomp or Riverdance. The König Pilsener Arena played host to UFC 122 on 13 November 2010.

Between 1997 and 2002, the arena was home to ice hockey club Revierlöwen Oberhausen. On 6 October 1998, Canadian player Stéphane Morin of visiting team Berlin Capitals died during a game at the arena.

=== Performers ===
- Anirudh Ravichander
- Drake
- A-ha
- Chris Brown
- Iron Maiden
- Kiss
- Alice Cooper
- Rush
- Judas Priest
- Manowar
- Amon Amarth
- Arch Enemy
- Sting
- Page and Plant
- Ronan Keating
- Rod Stewart
- Natalie Cole
- Status Quo
- Whitesnake
- Def Leppard
- Oasis
- Dionne Warwick
- Toni Braxton
- Cliff Richard
- Mark Knopfler
- R.E.M.
- Kylie Minogue
- Alanis Morissette
- Black Sabbath
- Ozzy Osbourne
- The Cure
- André Rieu
- Limp Bizkit
- The Smashing Pumpkins
- The Black Eyed Peas
- Bryan Adams
- Gloria Estefan
- Toto
- Placido Domingo
- No Doubt
- Prince & The New Power Generation
- Roger Waters
- David Gilmour
- Neil Young
- Dream Theater
- Fleetwood Mac
- The Corrs
- Puff Daddy
- Radiohead
- Meat Loaf
- Santana
- Volbeat
- Helene Fischer
- Paul McCartney
- Peter Gabriel
- Backstreet Boys
- Westlife
- 50 Cent
- Britney Spears
- Usher
- Anastacia
- Placebo
- Journey
- Within Temptation
- Elton John
- Bob Dylan
- Coldplay
- Foo Fighters
- The BossHoss
- The Who
- Leonard Cohen
- AC/DC
- Taylor Swift
- Five Finger Death Punch
- Tori Amos
- Lionel Richie
- Pink
- Shakira
- Deep Purple
- Scorpions
- Queensrÿche
- Nickelback
- Thirty Seconds to Mars
- Lenny Kravitz
- Depeche Mode
- Metallica
- Machine Head (band)
- Lady Gaga
- Public Enemy
- Kanye West
- Justin Bieber
- New Kids on the Block
- Bruno Mars
- Rihanna
- Joe Cocker
- Chris de Burgh
- Supertramp
- Simply Red
- Take That
- Die Fantastischen Vier
- Christina Aguilera
- Donots
- Tokio Hotel
- The Prodigy
- Roxette
- Alicia Keys
- Ellie Goulding
- Neil Diamond
- Al Bano and Romina Power
- Beyoncé
- Whitney Houston
- Sade
- Chris Rea
- Jennifer Lopez
- George Michael
- Zucchero
- Eros Ramazzotti
- Tool
- Eric Clapton
- One Direction
- Joe Cocker
- Harry Belafonte
- OneRepublic
- Sunrise Avenue
- Die Ärzte
- Nicki Minaj during her third tour, The Pinkprint Tour
- 5 Seconds of Summer
- Maroon 5
- Runrig
- Linkin Park
- Die Toten Hosen
- Imagine Dragons
- Soy Luna Live
- Violetta Live
- Nightwish
- Sabaton (band)
- Powerwolf
- Harry Styles
- Shawn Mendes
- Jeff Lynne's ELO
- Shahram Shabpareh
- Electric Callboy hosting their Escalation Fest twice (2022 & 2023)

== See also ==
- List of indoor arenas in Germany
