= Broock =

- Ortsteil of Lübz
- Interactive map of Broock
- Location within Germany Location within Mecklenburg-Vorpommern
- Coordinates: 53°28′N 12°07′E
- Country: Germany
- State: Mecklenburg-Vorpommern
- District: Ludwigslust-Parchim
- Town: Lübz
- Subdivisions: 2

Area
  - Total: 18.14 km^{2} (7.00 sq mi)
- Elevation: 70 m (230 ft)

Population (2006-12-31)
  - Total: 407
  - Density: 22.4/km^{2} (58.1/sq mi)
- Time zone: UTC+01:00 (CET)
  - Summer (DST): UTC+02:00 (CEST)
- Postal codes: 19386
- Dialling codes: 038731
- Vehicle registration: PCH
- Website: www.amt-eldenburg-luebz.de

Broock (German pronunciation: [bʁoːk]) is a village and a former municipality in the Ludwigslust-Parchim district, in Mecklenburg-Vorpommern, Germany. Since 1 January 2009, it is part of the town Lübz.
