= Beer Lane =

Former street in the City of London

Coordinates: 51°30′33.08″N 0°4′46.63″W

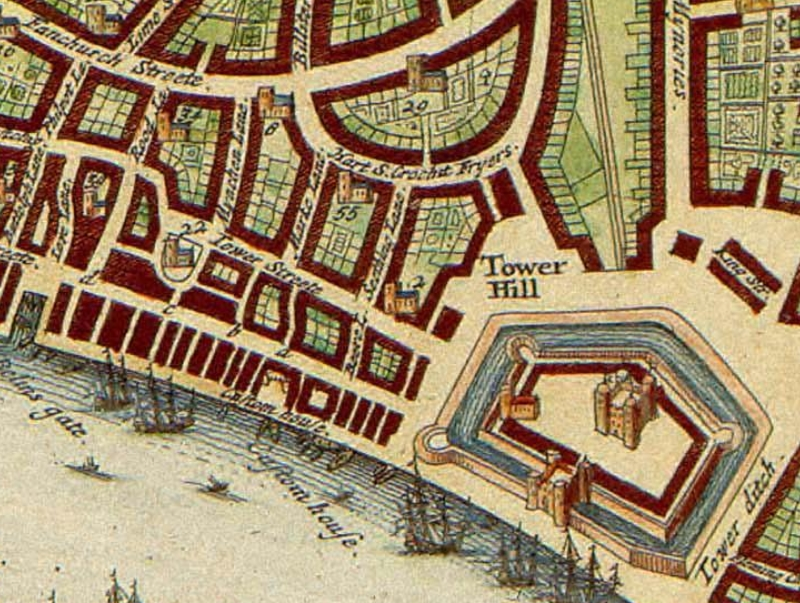
The lane on Hollar's map of London. Late 17th century. Click for broader map and to enable varied magnification.
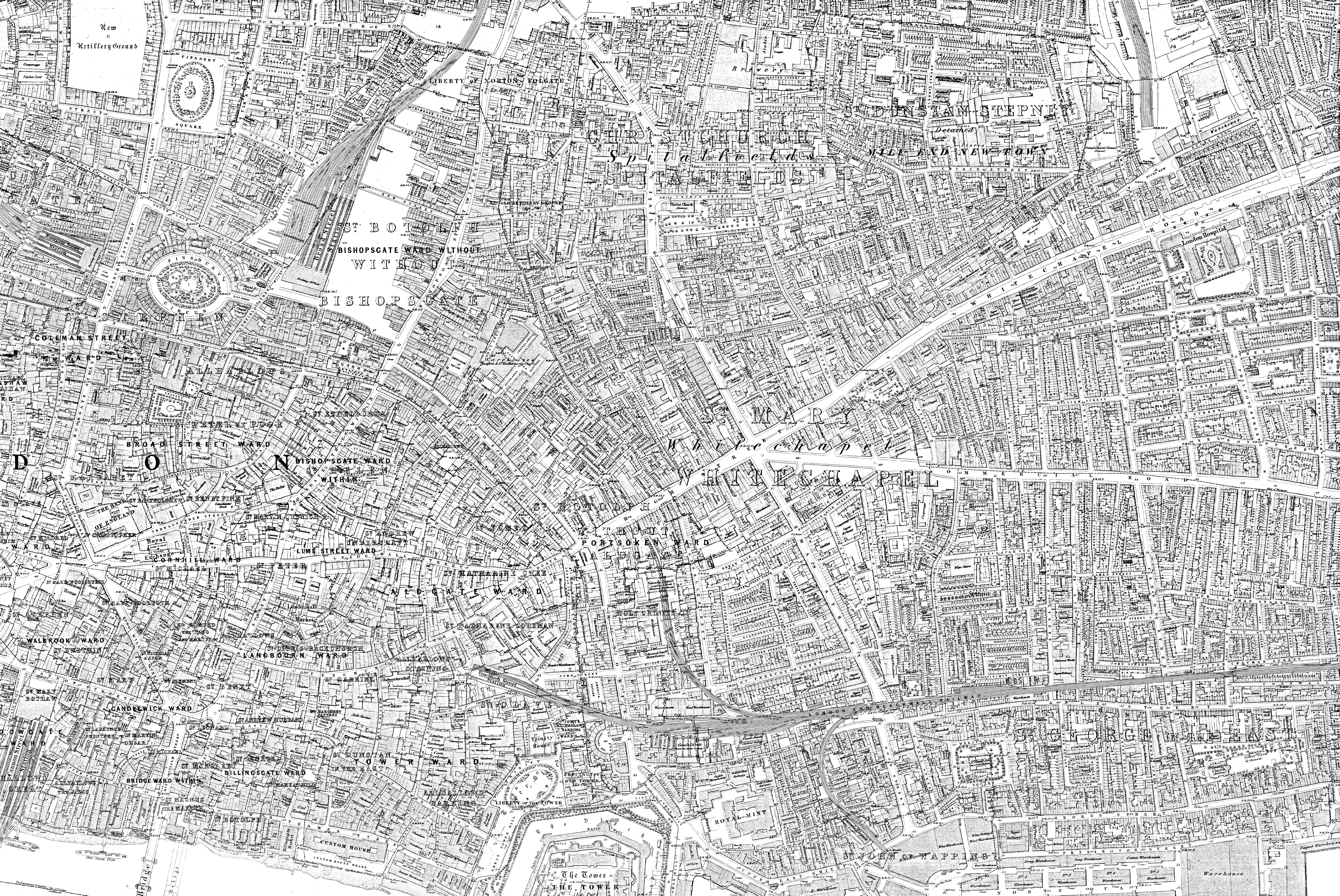
The lane in about 1875. Click for broader map and to enable varied magnification.

Beer Lane (originally Bear Lane or Beare Lane) was a short street of the City of London from at least 1570 to 1910. It ran from almost the east end of Great Tower Street (latterly № 37), from opposite Seething Lane, to 53 Lower Thames Street, opposite the east warehouse block of Custom House. John Stow (born 1525) wrote "At the east end of Tower Street, on the south side, have ye (Note: the pronunciation is that for the English word the as use of "th" for the ð sound (phoneme) used to be an alternative orthography to ye) Beare Lane, wherein are many fair houses, and runneth down to Thames Street."

Opposite its lower end, on the Tideway's city bank, was Bear Quay, later Great Bear Quay and Little Bear Quay, principally used for the landing and shipment of corn. Edward Hatton, in his A New View of London (1708) wrote "Here is a very great market for wheat and other sorts of grain, brought hither from the neighbouring counties".

In the early twentieth century, the lane hosted the office-warehouse of H.C. König & Co. from where they distributed their Westphalian Gin.

== See also ==
- Beer Street and Gin Lane (fictional)
