= König Brewery =

Brewery situated in Beeck, a neighborhood of Duisburg, Germany

Coordinates: 51°28′30″N 6°44′08″E

König-Brauerei GmbH

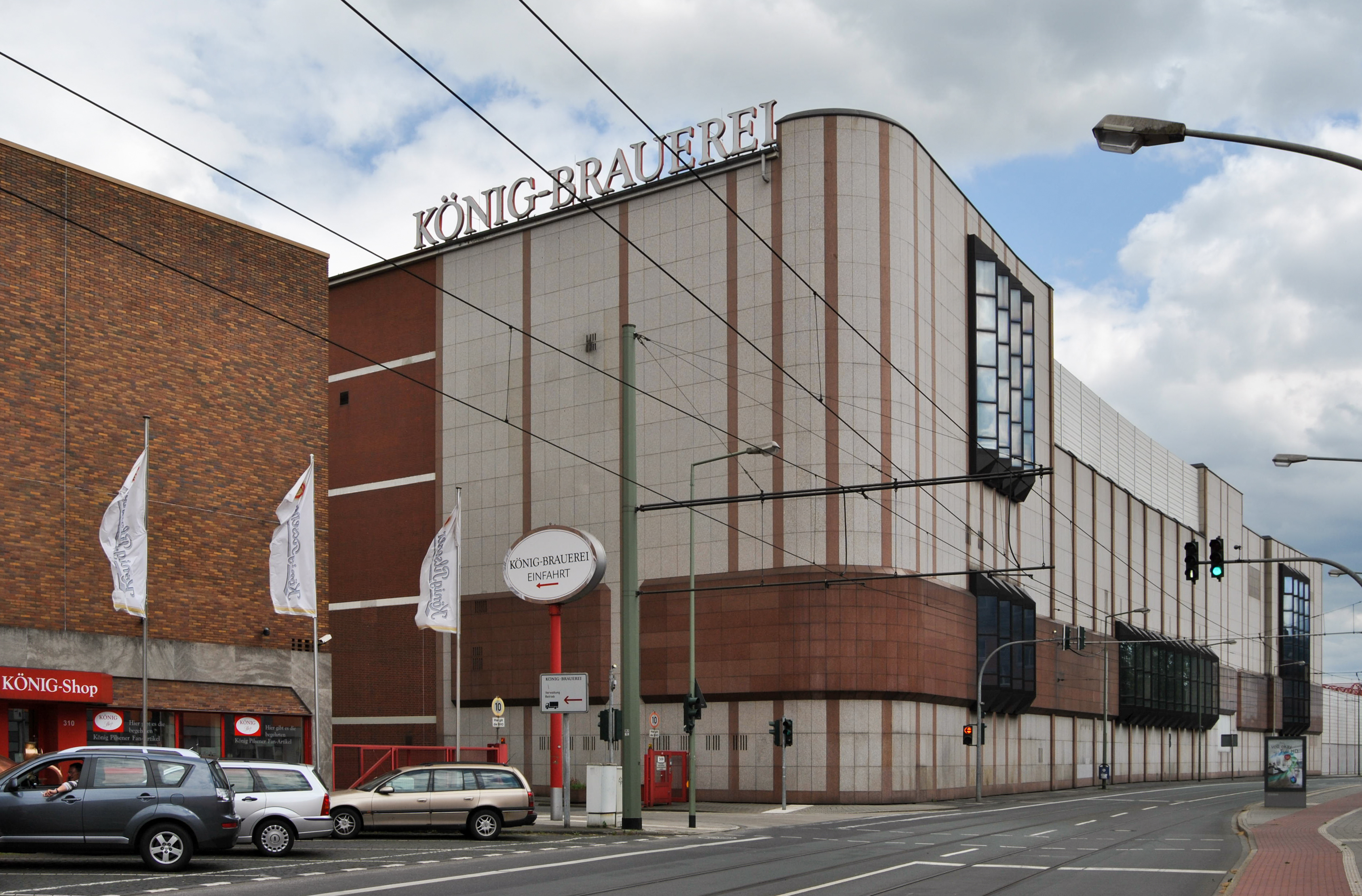
- Type: GmbH
- Location: Duisburg, Germany
- Opened: 1858
- Annual production volume: 1.11 million hectolitres (950,000 US bbl) in 2015
- Owned by: Bitburger
- Employees: 200
- Website: koenig.de

König Brewery is a brewery situated in Beeck, a neighborhood of Duisburg, Germany that brews the well-known König Pilsener (known in colloquial German as KöPi).

== History ==
Theodor König was born in 1825 at Üppenhagen (known today as Selm-Cappenberg); in 1858, he opened a brewery in the country district of Beeck which, at that time, did not yet form part of the city of Duisburg. He brewed lager in the Pilsener style, despite the fact that this bottom-fermented style of beer was relatively unpopular at the time. First records of König Pilsener appear in 1911. At first, König Pilsener was known for its bitter hoppiness; later, the beer was adapted to the requirements of a premium lager intended for mass consumption.

On 1 February 2000, König Brewery became a subsidiary of the Holsten Group; this group was then sold to Denmark's Carlsberg in 2004. Carlsberg broke up the Holsten Group, selling the König and Licher breweries to Bitburger.

== Beers ==
The brewery's most popular beer is König Pilsener. König Alt, a beer brewed in the Rhineland Altbier style, was developed in the 1970s, but then discontinued along with König Export and König Malz, a malt beer. New products include the alcohol-free Kelts beer, renamed König Pilsener Alkoholfrei in 2005. From 2006 to 2011, a beer-lemonade mix was available under the name König Pilsener Lemon. In 2011, the production of König Pilsener Lemon was discontinued and a new beer-lemonade mix was introduced under the name of König Pilsener Radler.

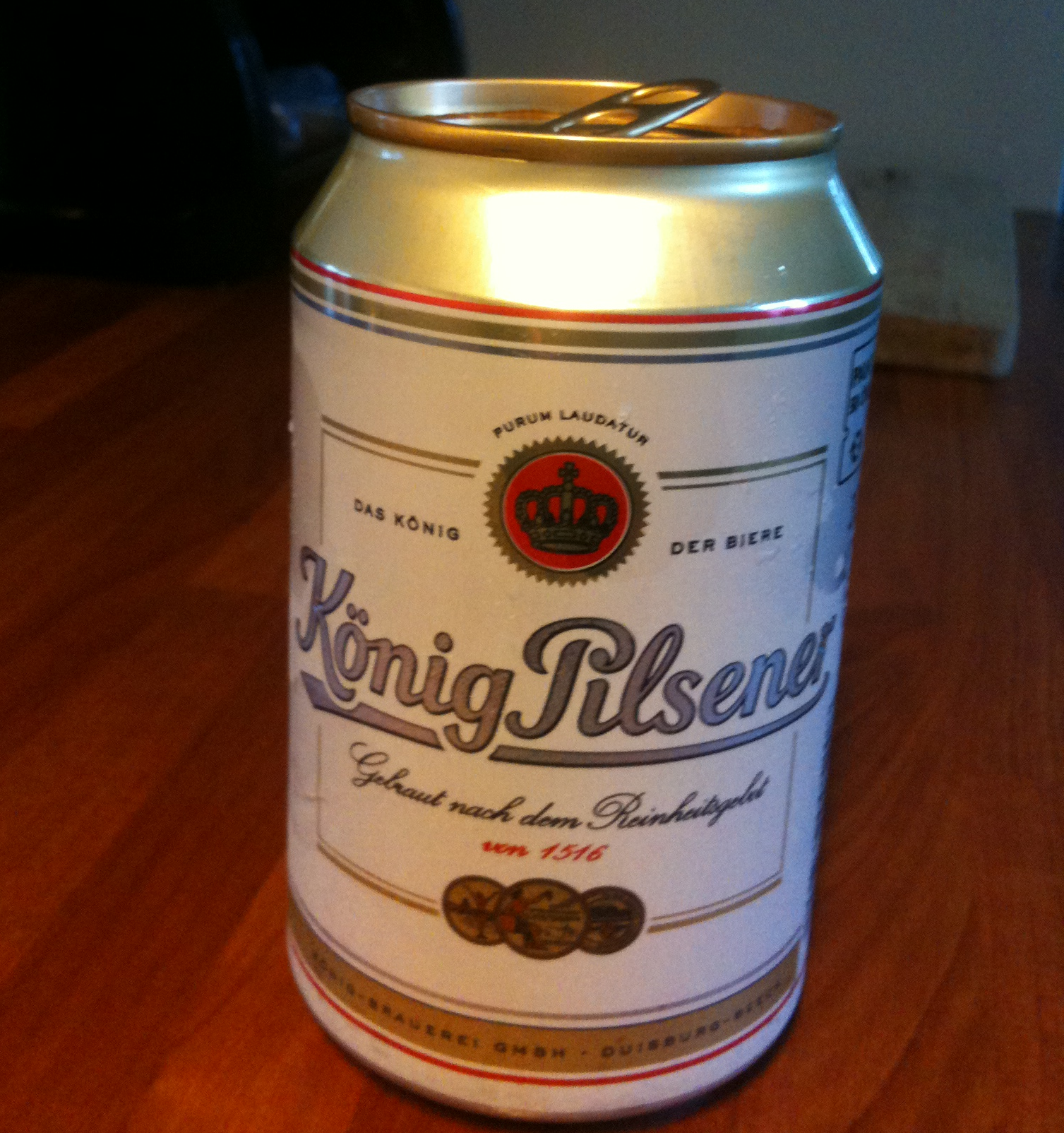
A can of König Pilsner

== Sponsorship ==
König Brewery sponsors several sports teams in the Rhine-Ruhr region. König Pilsener appears on the ice hockey kit of EV Duisburg and is also the official sponsor of the Nordkurve terraces at the MSV Duisburg football stadium. The brewery advertises elsewhere in the stadium, as well as in the Georg-Melches stadium in the neighbouring city of Essen.

== Advertising ==
Actor, director and producer Til Schweiger is a corporate representative for König Pilsener. He has appeared on billboard advertising, in print and on television.

== See also ==
- Konig's Westphalian Gin
