= Mecklenburgische Brauerei Lübz =

German brewery

Mecklenburgische Brauerei Lübz GmbH
- Type: GmbH
- Location: Lübz, Mecklenburg-Vorpommern, Germany
- Coordinates: 53°27′40″N 12°1′15″E
- Opened: 1877
- Key people: Willi Horn, Kristian Walsoe
- Annual production volume: 1.1 million hectolitres (940,000 US bbl) in 2016
- Owned by: Holsten Brewery
- Employees: 160
- Parent: Carlsberg Group
- Website: luebzer.de

Mecklenburgische Brauerei Lübz is a brewery in the German city of Lübz. It is best known for the Lübzer brand. With over 160 employees, it is the biggest employer in the city and one of the largest breweries in the region. Holsten Brewery holds a majority stake in the company; Holsten, in turn, is owned by Carlsberg Group.

== History ==
The Mecklenburgische Brauerei Lübz was founded in the year 1877 by August Krüger. During the following decades, it was operated under a variety of names, such as Bürgerliches Brauhaus GmbH zu Lübz (1905), Vereinsbrauerei Mecklenburger Wirte GmbH zu Lübz (1907), and Vereinsbrauerei Mecklenburger Wirte AG, Lübz (1921). After World War II, the brewery was dismantled, but production was able to resume in 1947. It could not be seized, as the majority stakeholder (55%) was an American citizen, so the operations continued on a fiduciary basis. A new brewery was constructed in 1969, after which it was folded into the Getränkekombinat Schwerin as "VEB Brauerei Lübz. The brewery owned the only beer canning line in East Germany and the beer was exported to West Germany.

After German reunification, the brewery was acquired by the Hamburg-based Holsten Brewery, which invested heavily in modernization. In 2004, Holsten was acquired by Carlsberg Group.

The Mecklenburgische Brauerei Lübz has a production capacity of 1.1 million hectolitres (940,000 US bbl). Alongside Darguner Brauerei and Hanseatische Brauerei Rostock, it is one of the largest breweries in Mecklenburg-Vorpommern and has sponsored football teams such as F.C. Hansa Rostock and FC Energie Cottbus.
