= Pilsner =

Type of pale lager beer

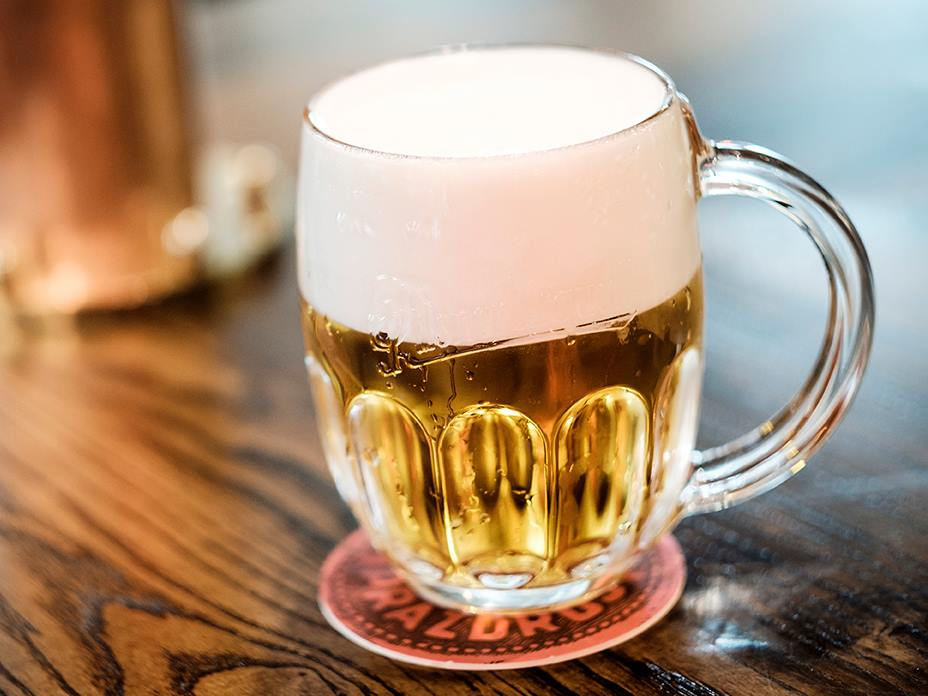
Pilsner Urquell, the world's first pale lager and ancestor of today's Pilsners

Pilsner (also pilsener or pils) is a type of pale lager. It takes its name from the Bohemian city of Plzeň (German: Pilsen), where the world's first pale lager (now known as Pilsner Urquell) was produced in 1842 by Pilsner Urquell Brewery.

== History ==
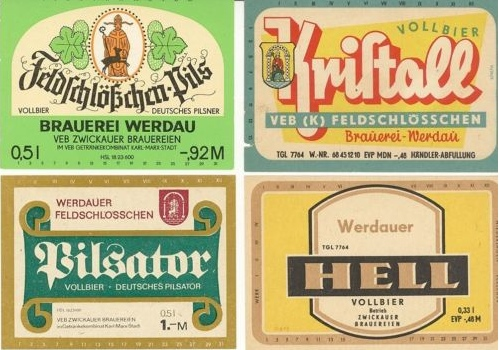
Historical examples of German pilsner beer labels from East Germany

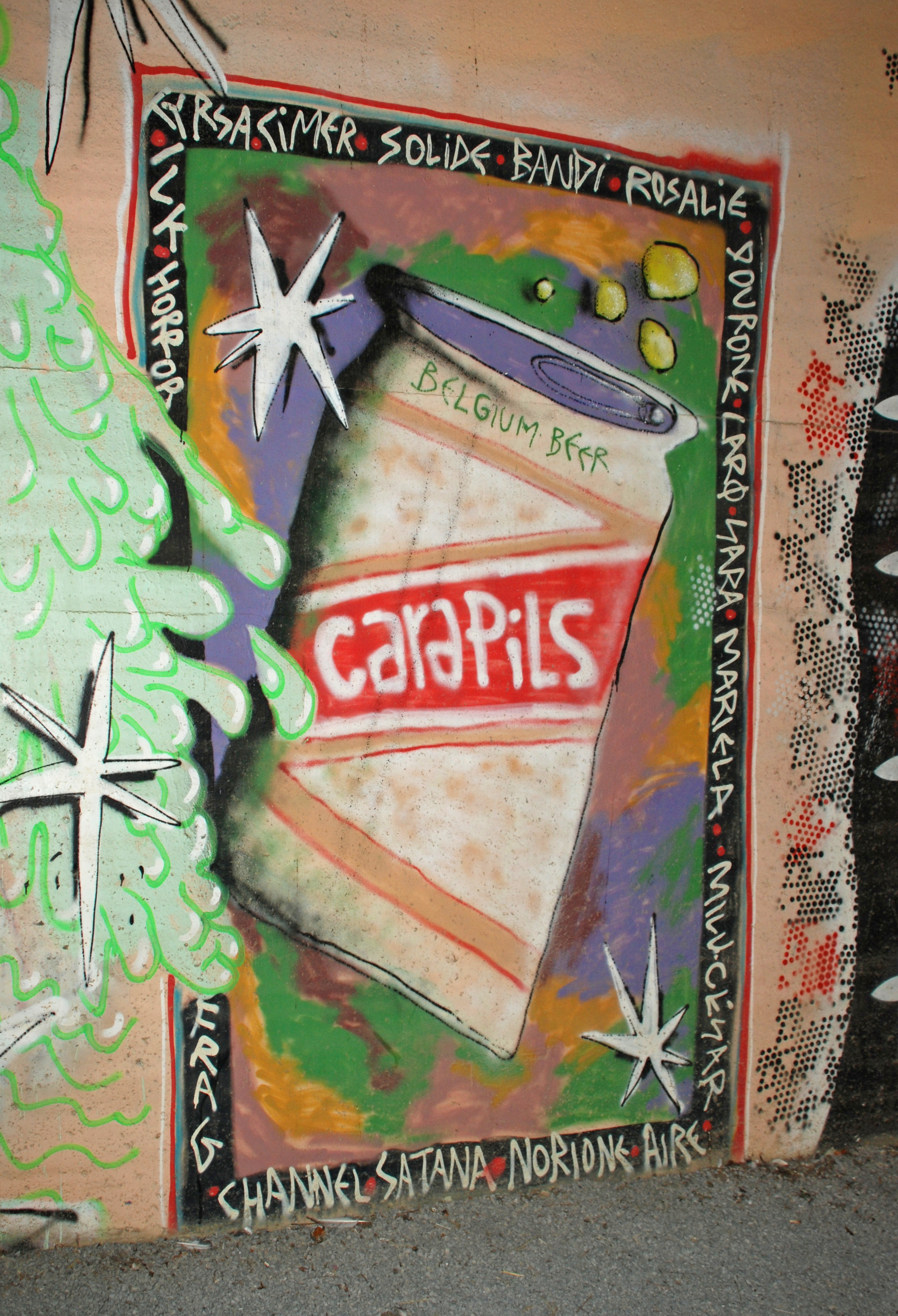
Can of Belgian Pils represented on a mural of the railway station of Louvain-la-Neuve (Belgium)

The oldest written mention of a brewery in Plzeň is from 1307. Until the mid-1840s, most Bohemian beers were top-fermented. The Pilsner Urquell Brewery, originally called in German: Bürger-Brauerei Pilsen (Czech: Měšťanský pivovar Plzeň, English: Plzeň Civic Brewery), is where Pilsen beer was first brewed.

Brewers had begun aging beer made with cool fermenting yeasts in caves (lager, i.e., German: gelagert [stored]), which improved the beer's clarity and shelf-life. Part of this research benefited from the knowledge already expounded on in a book (printed in German in 1794, in Czech in 1799) written by Czech brewer František Ondřej Poupě (German: Franz Andreas Paupie) (1753–1805) from Brno.

The Plzeň brewery recruited the Bavarian brewer Josef Groll (1813–1887) who, using the local ingredients, produced the first batch of pale lager on 5 October 1842. The combination of Plzeň's remarkably soft water, local Saaz noble hops from nearby Žatec, low-protein Moravian barley malt prepared by indirectly heated kilning, and Bavaria-style lagering produced a clear, golden beer.

By 1853, the beer was available at 35 pubs in Prague. In 1856, it came to Vienna and in 1862 to Paris. In 1859, Pilsner Bier was registered as a brand name at the Chamber of Commerce and Trade in Plzeň. In 1898, the Pilsner Urquell trademark was created to put emphasis on being the original brewery (Urquell, meaning 'original source').

Some beers are labeled Urtyp Pilsener (UP) meaning they are brewed according to the original process, although many breweries use this accolade for their top beer.

=== Modern developments ===
The introduction of modern refrigeration to Germany by Carl von Linde in the late 19th century eliminated the need for caves for beer storage, enabling the brewing and storing of cool fermenting beer in many new locations.

Until 1993 the Pilsner Urquell brewery fermented its beer using open barrels in the cellars beneath their brewery. This changed in 1993 with the use of large cylindrical tanks. Small samples are still brewed in a traditional way for taste comparisons.

A modern pale lager termed a pilsner may have a very light, clear colour from pale to golden yellow, with varying levels of hop aroma and flavour. The alcohol strength of beers termed pilsner vary but are typically around 4.5%–5% (by volume). There are categories such as "European-Style Pilsner" at beer competitions such as the World Beer Cup. Pilsner style lagers are marketed internationally by numerous small brewers and larger conglomerates.

== Styles ==
Czech-style Pilsner
Bright golden colour, moderately bitter and distinct aroma, brewed with malt and Saaz hops. In the Czech Republic, only Pilsner Urquell is named as "pilsner". However, outside of the Czech Republic, Czech-style Pilsner is synonymous with any such lager beers (including any Czech brand) – for example Pilsner Urquell, Budweiser Budvar, Gambrinus, Kozel, Radegast, Staropramen, Starobrno and Krušovice.

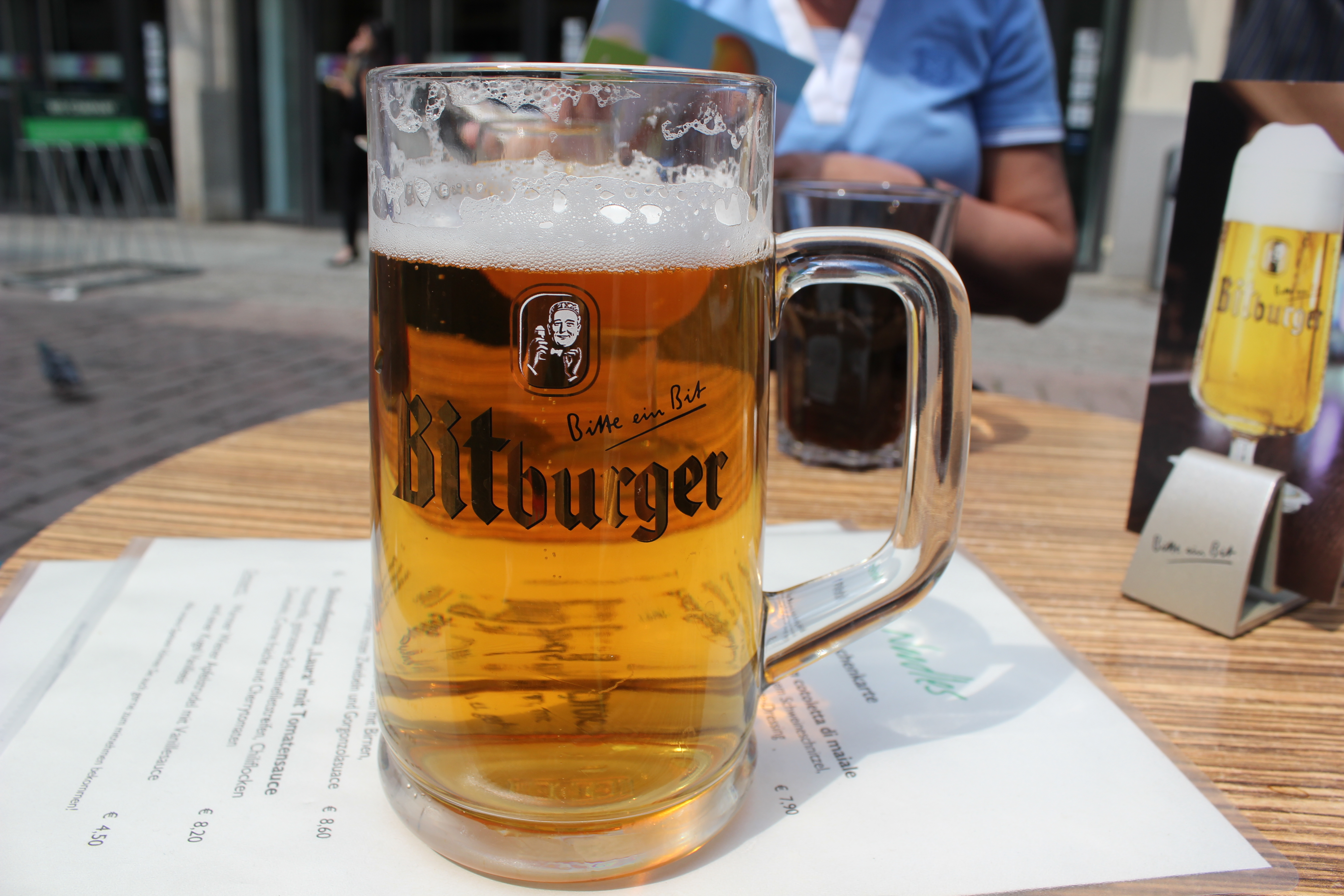
A mug of Bitburger, a German-style Pilsner

German-style Pilsner
Light straw to golden colour with more bitter or earthy taste – such as Beck's, Bitburger, Flensburger, Fürstenberg, Holsten, Jever, König, Krombacher, Radeberger, St. Pauli Girl, Veltins, Warsteiner, Wernesgrüner and Einbecker.

European-style Pilsner
Has a slightly sweet taste, can be produced from grains other than barley malt – such as the Dutch: Amstel, Grolsch and Heineken or Belgian: Jupiler, Maes and Stella Artois.

American-style Pilsner
German immigrants brought pilsner style beers to the United States in the mid-19th century. American pilsners today are still closer to the German style, but a traditional grist may contain up to 25% corn and/or rice.

West Coast-style Pilsner
Modern iteration, light to golden color brewed with American or southern hemisphere hops, possibly dry-hopped. Developed on the West Coast of the United States. Clean and light, with more pronounced hop flavor and aroma.

Australian-style Pilsner
Light straw to golden colour with more crisp, clean earthy taste.

== See also ==
- Beer by region
