= Gischow =

- Ortsteil of Lübz
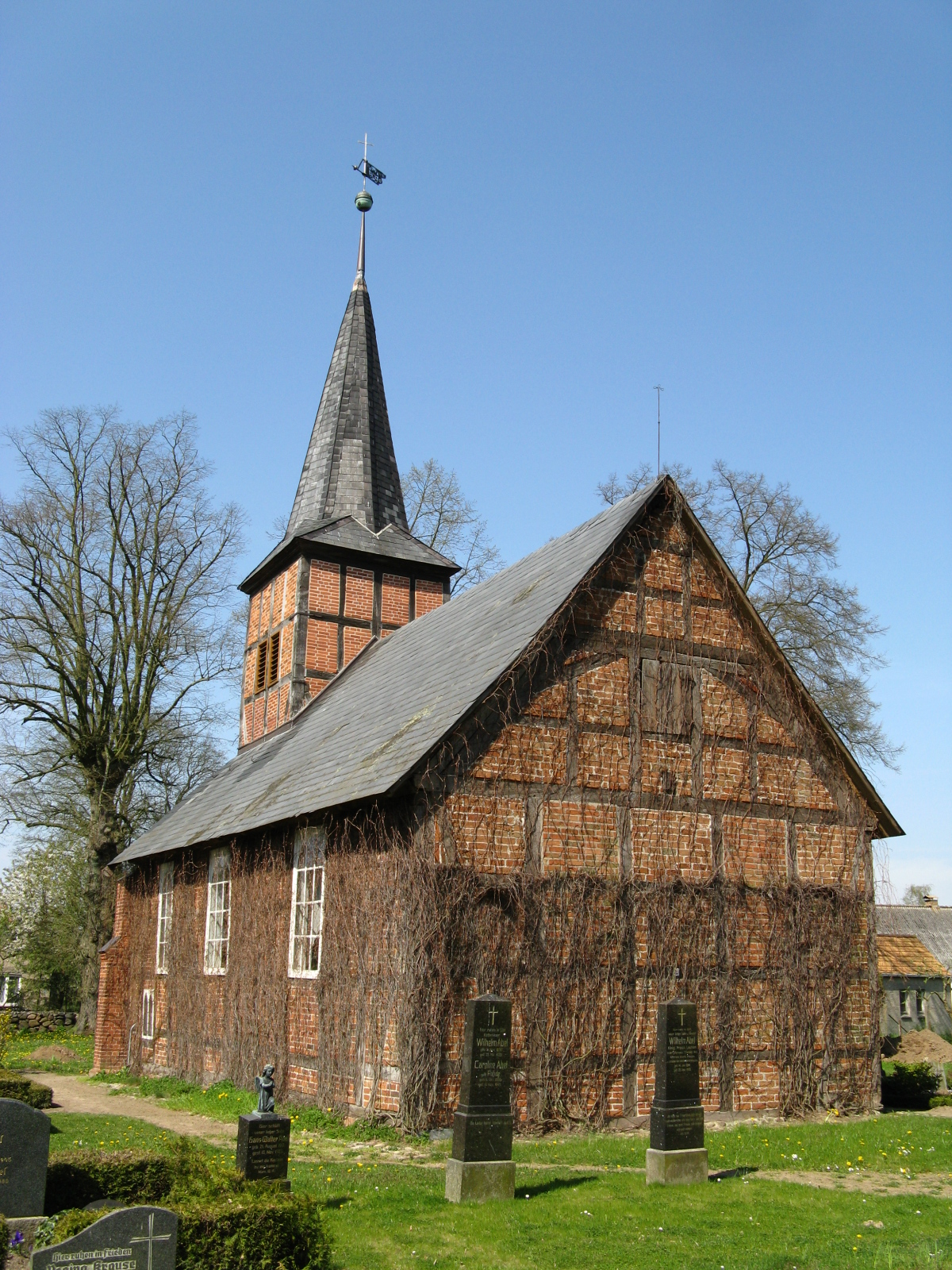
- Church
- Interactive map of Gischow
- Location within Germany Location within Mecklenburg-Vorpommern
- Coordinates: 53°26′N 12°01′E
- Country: Germany
- State: Mecklenburg-Vorpommern
- District: Ludwigslust-Parchim
- Town: Lübz

Area
  - Total: 16.96 km^{2} (6.55 sq mi)
- Elevation: 58 m (190 ft)

Population (2017-12-31)
  - Total: 233
  - Density: 13.7/km^{2} (35.6/sq mi)
- Time zone: UTC+01:00 (CET)
  - Summer (DST): UTC+02:00 (CEST)
- Postal codes: 19386
- Dialling codes: 038731
- Vehicle registration: PCH

Gischow (German pronunciation: [ˈɡɪʃoː]) is a village and a former municipality in the Ludwigslust-Parchim district, in Mecklenburg-Vorpommern, Germany. Since May 2019, it is part of the town Lübz.
