= St. Georg, Brockhagen =

St. Georg
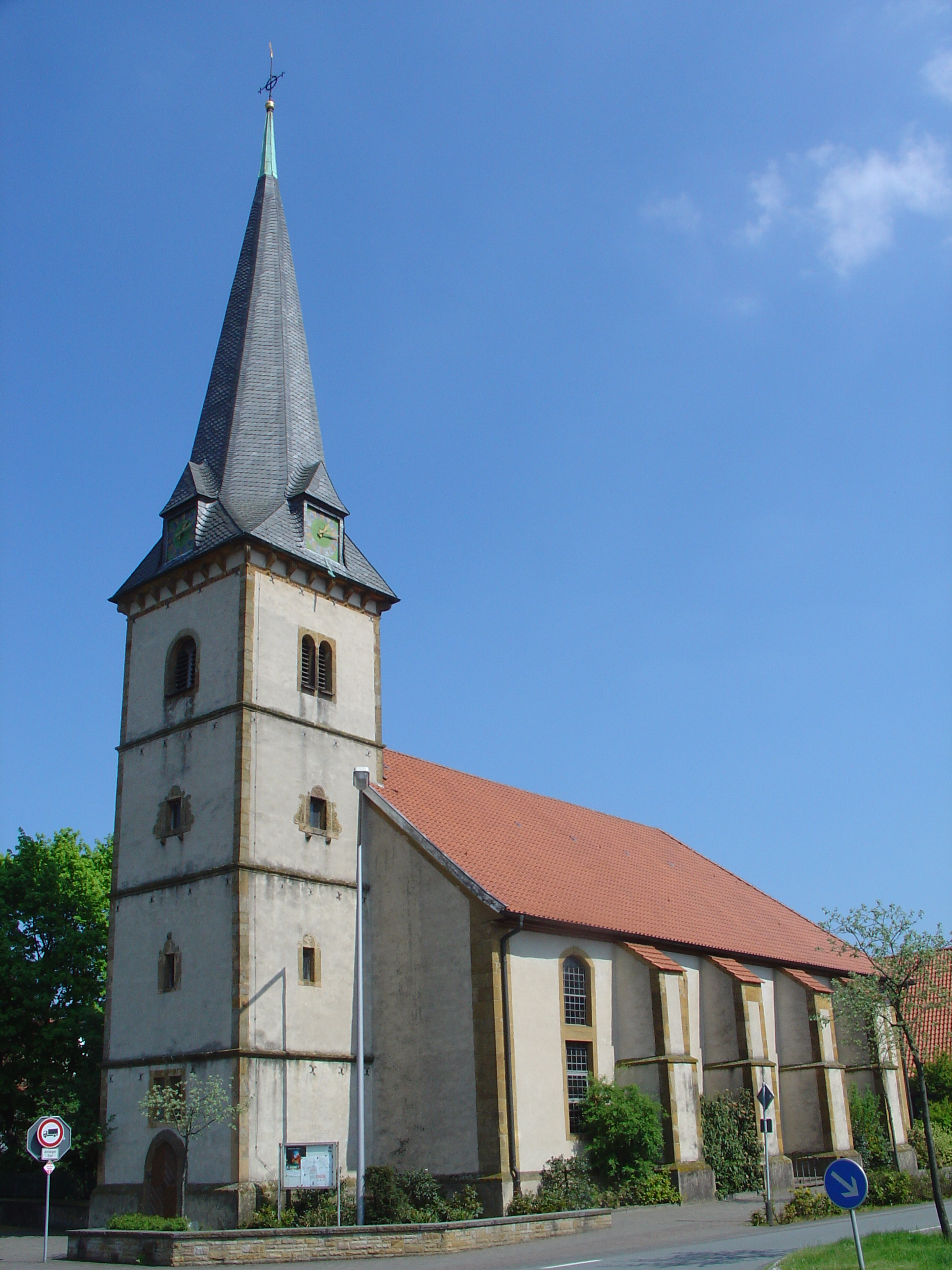
- St. Georg in Brockhagen

- 51°59′31″N 8°20′38″E
- Location: Brockhagen, part of Steinhagen, North Rhine-Westphalia
- Denomination: Lutheran
- Churchmanship: Evangelical Church of Westphalia

History
- Dedication: St. Georg

Architecture
- Style: Aisleless church

St. Georg is a Lutheran parish church in Brockhagen, now part of Steinhagen, North Rhine-Westphalia, Germany. The church and parish belong to the Kirchenkreis Halle of the Evangelical Church of Westphalia.

The aisleless church has a west steeple dated 1568, with four storeys.

The parish of Brockhagen became independent of Halle in 1568. It was then that a chapel was replaced by the church building. Between 1752 and 1754, a new nave was added. The altar is dated 1675 and features two oil paintings, showing The Last Supper and the Resurrection of Jesus. The organ, possibly built by Hans Henrich Reinking, was installed in 1661. The pulpit is from the 18th century.

The church interior was restored over eight months in 2017, including new lighting, more flexible seating by replacing some benches with chairs, and a new heating system.
