= Steinhäger =

Type of German gin

Coordinates: 52°00′17″N 8°24′49″E

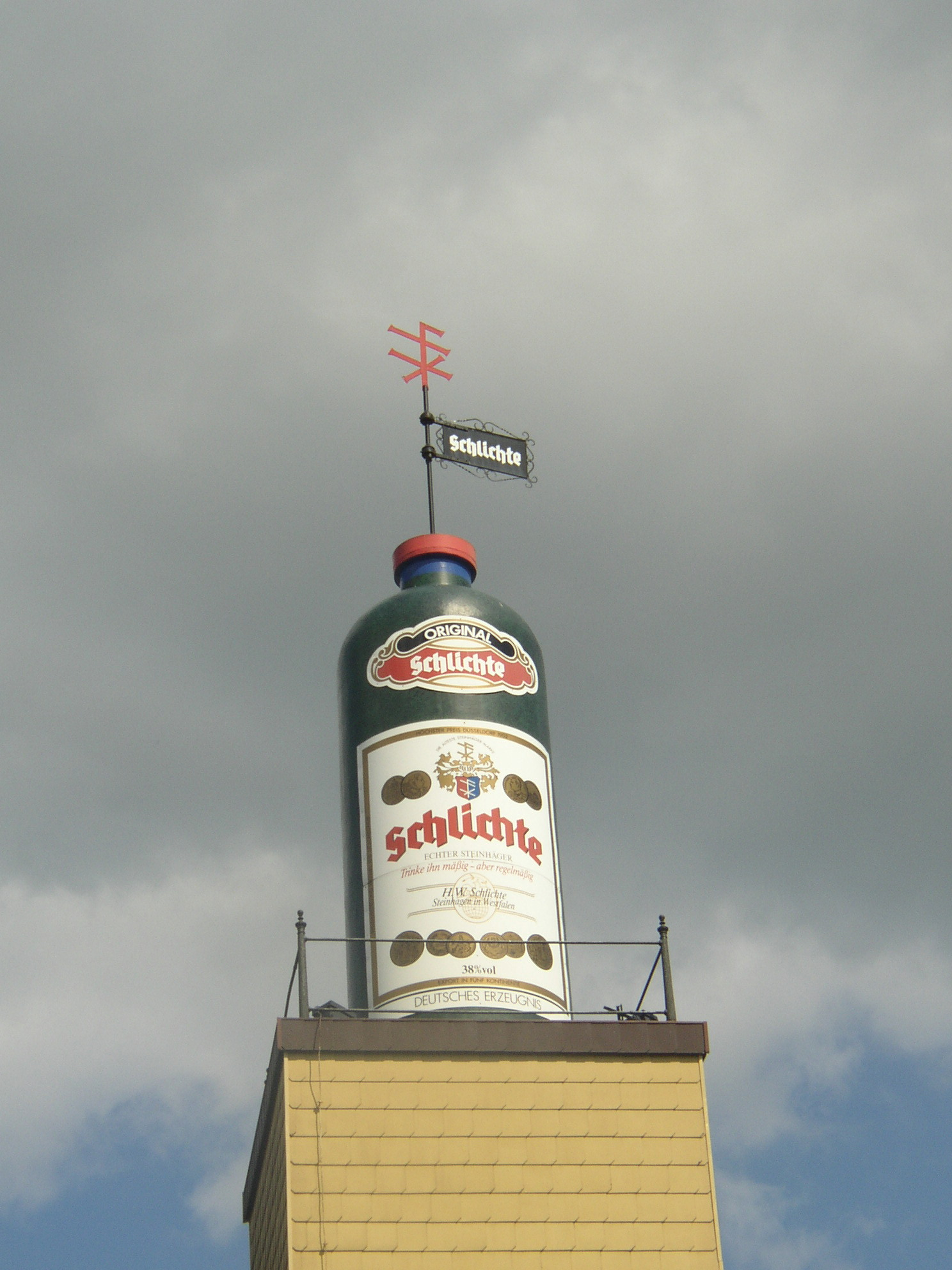
Steinhäger advertising

Steinhäger is a type of German gin, a spirit flavoured with juniper berries. The name is derived from the Westphalian municipality of Steinhagen, the only place where it is permitted to be produced.

For centuries, local distilleries sold schnaps made up of grain and fermented must of the numerous juniper shrubs growing on the slopes of the Teutoburg Forest. By edict of 1688, the "Great Elector" Frederick William of Brandenburg, in his capacity as Count of Ravensberg, granted the inhabitants of Steinhagen the exclusive privilege to distil liquor. During the 19th century, about 20 companies were founded in the village; today, only two manufacturers (H. W. Schlichte established in 1766 and Zum Fürstenhof, a subsidiary of Kisker Distilleries in Halle since 1955) still produce gin.

Steinhäger is typically sold in long brown earthenware (Steingut) bottles and in glass bottles made to look like earthenware. Since 1989, the Steinhäger geographical indication is protected by a European Economic Community directive. The alcohol content is usually 38% ABV but sometimes higher. The European Union has set a minimum of 37.5% ABV for it.

== See also ==
- Jenever
- Konig's Westphalian Gin
- Krambambula (drink)
