= Brau und Brunnen =

Brau und Brunnen AG
- Formerly: Dortmunder Union-Schultheiss Brauerei AG (1972–1988)
- Type: Aktiengesellschaft
- Industry: Brewing, beverages
- Predecessors: Schultheiss-Brauerei; Dortmunder Union-Brauerei
- Founded: 1972
- Defunct: 2004
- Fate: Acquired by Dr. August Oetker KG and integrated into Radeberger Gruppe
- Successor: Binding Brewery
- Headquarters: Germany

Brau und Brunnen AG ("Brew and Spring") was a German brewing and beverage group formed in 1972.

== History ==
In 1972, a merger between Schultheiss-Brauerei and Dortmunder Union-Brauerei formed the beverage company Dortmunder Union-Schultheiss Brauerei AG. It was later renamed Brau und Brunnen in 1988. The company owned a number of formerly independent breweries, including Einbecker Brewery.

=== Growth and decline ===
Until the early 1990s, Brau und Brunnen was the largest beverage company in Germany, but its market share steadily declined throughout the 1990s. An additional cause for the decline was the company's purchase of Bavaria – St. Pauli Brewery and Jever for an estimated 800 million DM, although these purchases were later estimated to only be worth closer to 250 million DM. Following a series of mergers and acquisitions, the company had lowered to the fourth-largest beverage company by 1999.

=== Dissolution ===
After unsuccessful internal reorganizations, the company was purchased by Dr. August Oetker KG and integrated into its subsidiary Radeberger Gruppe.
