= Licher Brewery =

German brewery

Licher Privatbrauerei Ihring-Melchior
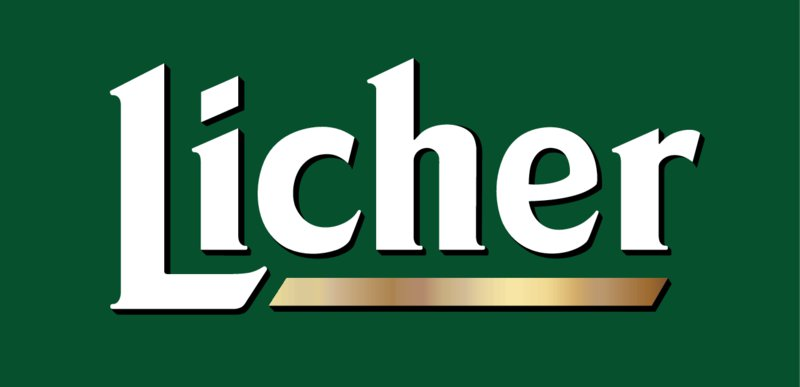
- Interactive map of Licher Privatbrauerei Ihring-Melchior
- Type: GmbH
- Location: Lich, Hesse, Germany
- Coordinates: 50.515°N 8.818°E
- Opened: 1854
- Key people: Christoph Melchior & J.H. Ihring
- Annual production volume: 780,000 hectolitres (660,000 US bbl)
- Other products: Licher Premium Pilsener, Licher Export, Licher Alcohol Free, Licher x² Cola, Licher x² Fresh Lemon, Licher Leicht, Licher Radler, Licher Weizen Hefe Hell, Licher Doppelbock
- Employees: 250
- Parent: Bitburger Brewery
- Website: licher.de

Licher is a brewery in Lich, Germany. With 250 employees, the brewery is the largest in Lich. "Licher Beer" has been market leader since 1988 in Hessen and is known to be one of the top 20 beers in the German beer market.

== Founding and beginnings ==
=== J.H. Ihring Brauerei ===
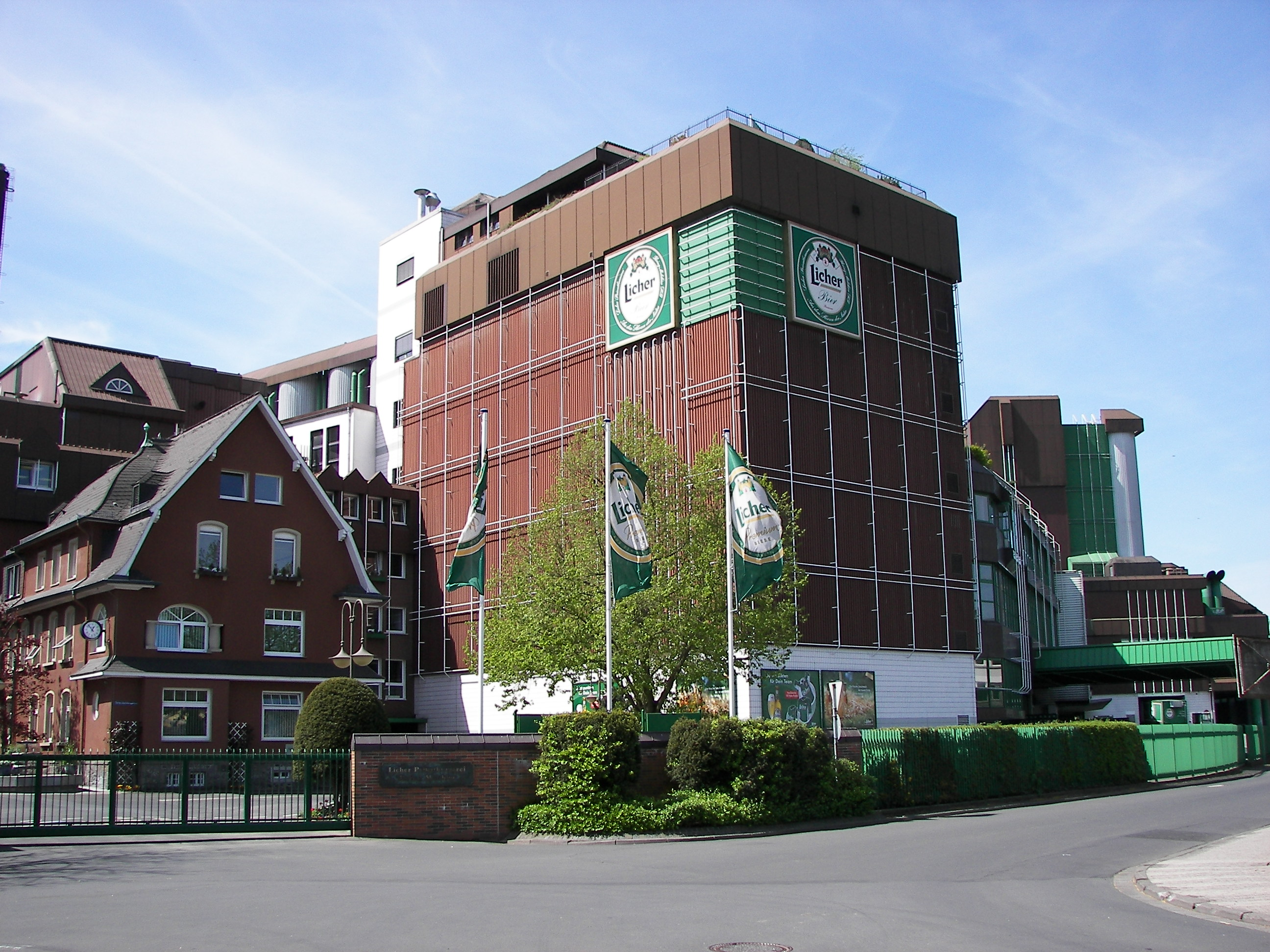
Licher Brauerei

In 1854, brewer Johann Heinrich Ihring started the J.H. Ihring Brewery in Lich am Hardtberg. At this location there is a natural spring and a fermentation cellar for chilling the beer. Johann's father was known to provide the beer to the guests and residents of his guesthouse, which was called "Zum goldenen Löwen" ("The Golden Lion"). Since 1873, the steam-brewing process has been powered by a 6 HP motor. At the turn of the century, the company had brewed a total of 22,000 hectoliters. In 1911 the beer of the brewery was transported between locations with a single truck belonging to the brewery.

=== Gambrinus-Brewery ===
Starting in 1858, Christoph Jakob Melchior ran "Zum goldenen Stern" ("The Golden Star") guesthouse in Butzbach with his self-brewed beer provided to the guests. Three years later construction of the private brewery began and shortly thereafter construction was begun on subsequent guesthouse to be called "Zum Gambrinus" ("The Gambrinus") featuring an outdoor gastronome. In 1896 Melchior died and his sons Hermann Melchior and the late Christoph Melchior took over the business. Starting in 1890, the boys had helped their father to seek new business further away through their communication with customers, three years later, the guesthouse was provided with electricity, leading to the installation of a refrigerator to be used in the brewing shortly after. At the turn of century this brewery had produced upwards of 27,000 hectoliters.

=== Brauerei Ihring-Melchior KG ===
Because of the close proximity of the breweries (15 km) they joined to form the "Union Brauerei" ("Union Brewery") During World War I the breweries were forced to split apart. In 1922 the two owners, Christoph Melchior and Heinrich Ihring came together and discussed a plan for the reunification of the breweries. On February 17, 1922, a deal was agreed upon and the "Brauerei Ihring-Melchior" was established. On October 1, 1922, the location of the brewery was agreed upon and established in Lich, Mittelhesse.

The cumulative production of the breweries raised annual production to approximately 60,000 hectoliters. Due to the terrible and exorbitant inflation of the 1920s, the brewery established a new record when its yearly profit was reported as 1,626,239,640,632 Marks. In the same year, Heinrich Ihring's son, Hans Ihring started an Ice-production company and in 1925/1926 had a production capability of nearly 25 tons of ice per day, regardless of weather conditions. In 1929 the company had grown and employed 100 people.

Because of the market crash of the late 1920s and early 1930s production in 1931 sank to record low of a mere 44,000 Hectoliters, the lowest production of the company since its unification of the two parent breweries. It was in 1933 that Heinrich Ihring died, his company was still struggling in the poor market conditions. In 1938 production had once again risen and was reported as 80,000 hectoliters, in this year the company adopted a new means of cleaning and filling bottles, likely aiding in the success of that year. During World War II the brewery remained intact and unscathed. After the war's end, the brewery came under the control of the American occupational forces and supplied to the soldiers located in the country. In 1948 the brewery was allowed exports and produced the "Doppel-Export" ("Double-Export") which held a 14% market share.

In 1999, Licher bought a portion of "Holstein-Brauerei AG" and later came to buy out the entire company. In 2004 both companies came together under the "Carlsberg-Gruppe", however, this unity was short lived after the ownership rights were repurchased in 2004.

== Current business ==
Since 2004 Licher has worked as partners with König Brewery, a brewery owned by Bitburger. The company is operated under the DIN/ISO 9001 requirements and fulfills all the requirements of the "International Food Standard" (IFS). The company is renowned by the Hessian Umweltministerium (Environment Protection Agency) for its extraordinarily clean production process. Since 2006, the two bottling facilities operated under Licher contracts have been capable of producing 115,000 bottles of beer per hour.

During the 1960s the company's slogan read "Aus dem Herzen von Hessen" (From the Heart of Hessen"), but in 1970 the slogan was modified to read "Licher Bier, aus dem Herzen der Natur" ("Licher Beer, From the Heart of Nature").

== Sales to U.S. Armed Forces ==
By the mid-1980s, Licher had become one of the favored beer brands for U.S. forces in Hessen, with sales in posts across the region. The brand could be found in Enlisted, Non-Commissioned, and Officer Clubs on tap and by bottle, as well as at PXs and commissaries. The brewery became a frequent host for "friendship" tours for various nearby units; each visit climaxing with the opportunity for soldiers to sample Licher beers in breadth and depth.

== Products ==
In 2006 the brewery produced 780,000 hectoliters of beer utilizing water from a deep natural spring and the highest quality wheat. Current beers and drinks from Licher include "Licher Premium Pilsener", "Licher Export", "Licher Alkoholfrei" (Alcohol-Free), "Licher Leicht" (Low-carb beer), "Licher x² Cola" (A drink containing 40% Pilsener beer and 60% cola), "Licher x² Fresh Lemon" (A drink made with half Pilsener beer and half lemonade), "Licher Radler" (Similar to the Fresh Lemon variety with an added citrus flavour and a more subtle lemon flavour). In 2006 a new variety was added "Licher Weizen Hefe Hell" (Light Wheat Beer) and in 2007 another alcohol free Pilsener variety was added, in addition to this a seasonal brew was introduced called "Doppelbock". Starting in 2010, the brewery began producing "Licher x² Energy" (A drink containing 40% Pilsener beer and 60% energy drink).

== Literature ==
- Licher Privatbrauerei Jhring-Melchior GmbH & Co. KG: 150 Jahre Licher, Lich 2004
