= Einbecker Brewery =

Brewery in Einbeck, Lower Saxony, Germany

Einbecker Brauhaus
- Interactive map of Einbecker Brauhaus
- Location: Einbeck, Germany
- Opened: 1378
- Annual production volume: 0.75 million hectolitres (640,000 US bbl)
- Owner: Group of investors

Active beers
Name	Type
Pilsener	Pilsener
Fun	Non-alcoholic
Light	Light beer
Lime	mixed beer drink with lime

Seasonal beers
Name	Type
Maibock	bock beer

The Einbecker Brewery (German: Einbecker Brauhaus) is a brewery located in Einbeck, Lower Saxony, Germany. Founded before 1378, it is one of the oldest still operating breweries in the world. The city of Einbeck is the birthplace of the bock beer, and makes multiple varieties thereof.

== History ==
The region of Lower Saxony and the town of Einbeck in particular dominated the European beer market during the fourteenth century, when the Hanseatic League helped distribute Einbeck's bock beer throughout Northern Europe. The Einbecker Brewery is the only remaining brewery from that tradition, and was already in operation in 1378: the first city record in Einbeck that mentions beer dates from 28 April 1378, and refers to the sale of two casks of beer ("Einbecker") to the town of Celle, some 130 kilometres (80 mi) away. The brewery claims the tradition with the inscription "without Einbeck there would be no bock" (ohne Einbeck gäb's kein Bockbier) above its door. Notable drinkers of Einbecker include, reportedly, Martin Luther, who was given a cask of it before the 1521 trial where he was to be excommunicated, and supposedly praised it in a two-line doggerel verse. Luther was also gifted a barrel of Einbecker in June 1525 by the city of Wittenberg on the occasion of his marriage to Katherine von Bora.

Einbeck’s dominance lasted until the Thirty Years' War. Brewing rights in Einbeck were owned by the city, and brewing operations were consolidated in 1794 in a publicly owned city brewery, from then on the sole brewery in the city. Its beer was first bottled in 1884, in the "distinctive low-shouldered bottle" that the company still uses.

The brewery, which had taken over two other regional breweries (Göttinger Brauhaus and Kassel's Martini Brauerei, in 1988 and 1997), merged into the brewing consortium Brau und Brunnen. In 2010, Einbecker produced 850,000 hectolitres (22 million US gallons) hectoliters per year and employed 200 people.

== Products ==
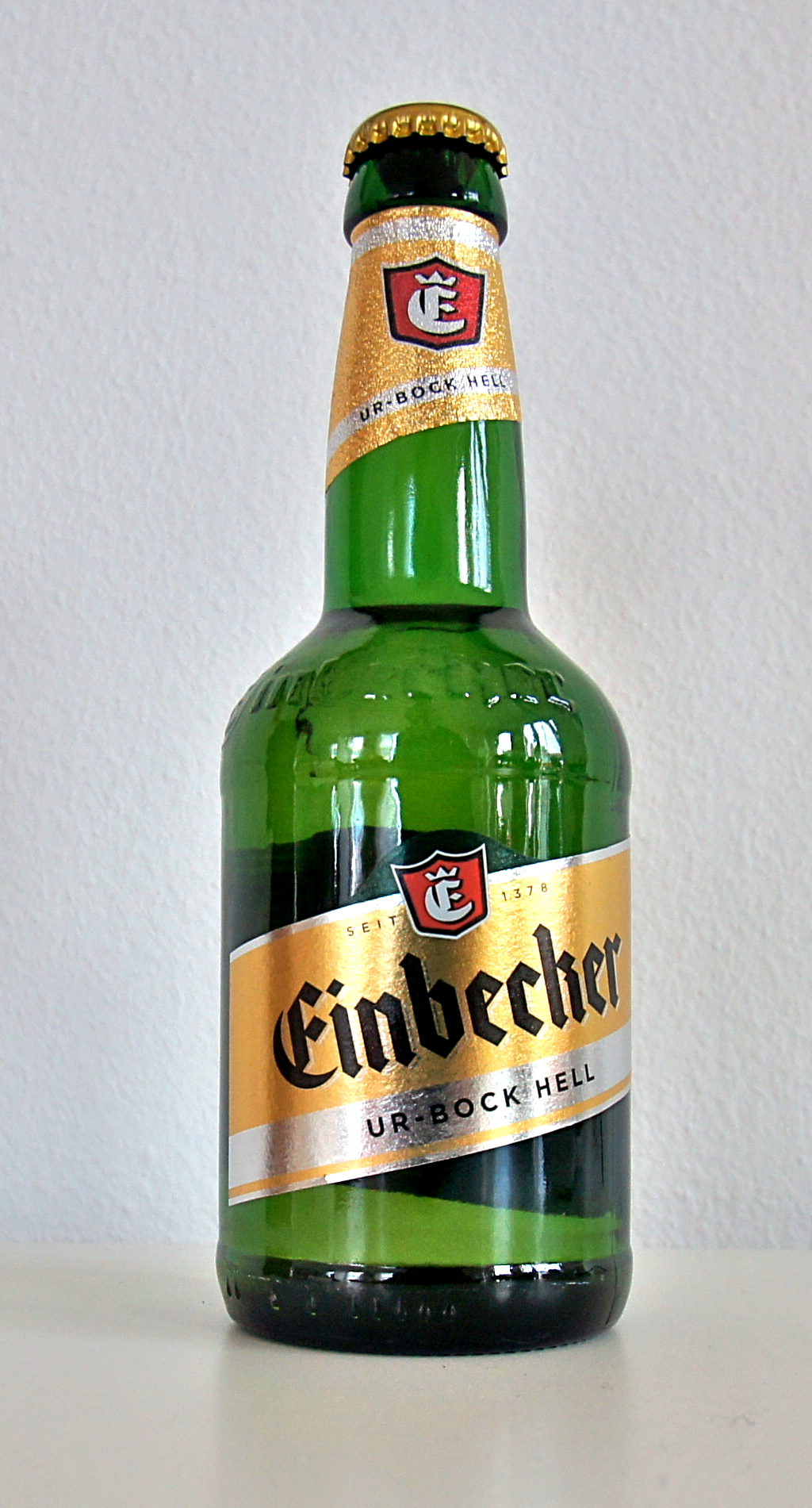
Typical Einbecker bottle, in use since 1884

Einbecker Brewery produces three "original" bocks, but its best-selling beer is a pilsner, Brauherren Pils. Like the Czech beer Pilsner Urquell, Einbecker is considered "original" enough to warrant the designation Ur, or "original," which it carries in all of its bocks. In 2018, the brewery offers four bocks (two seasonal) and several other kinds (inc. one seasonal).

=== Bock ===
round the year:

- Ur-Bock-Hell, a golden bock, 6.5%
- Ur-Bock-Dunkel, a dark bock, 6.5%

seasonal:

- Mai-Ur-Bock, a Maibock, 6.5% (available in May only)
- Winter-Bock, a doppelbock, 7.5% and the strongest they brew (available November/December only)

=== Pilsner ===
- Brauherren Pils, 4.8% (also in a non*-alcohol version. *Means less than 0.5%)
- Pilsner, 4.8%

=== Other ===
- Dunkel, a dark malty lager, 5.3%.
- Lager, a pale lager, 4.4%
- Helles, a pale lager, 5.0%. (Only available in kegs)
- Landbier, an amber lager with noted hops, 5.2%
- Weihnachtsbier, an amber lager, 5.3%. This X-mas beer is available in December only.
- Radler, the Brauherren Pils above mixed with citrus juices, 2.5%.

The brewery also produces several non-alcoholic beverages and Radler.
