= Abrocksbach =

River in Germany

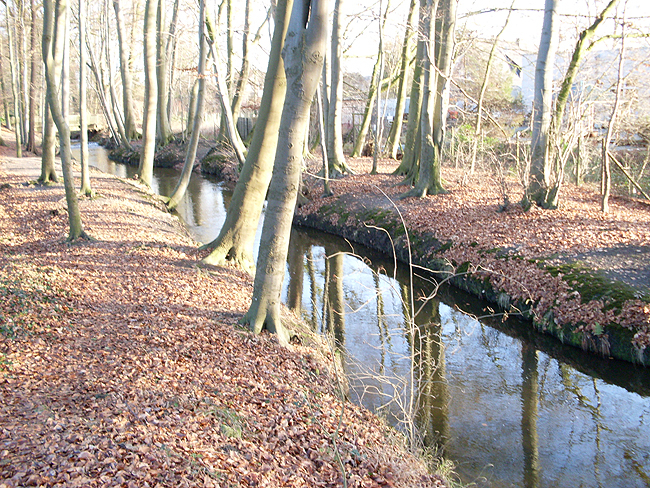

Location
- Country: Germany
- State: North Rhine-Westphalia

Physical characteristics
- Mouth
  - location: Ems
  - coordinates: 51.9510°N 8.2053°E
- Length: 22.0 km (13.7 mi)

Basin features
- Progression: Ems→ North Sea

Abrocksbach is a river of North Rhine-Westphalia, Germany. It flows into the Ems near Harsewinkel.

== See also ==
- List of rivers of North Rhine-Westphalia
