= Bavaria – St. Pauli Brewery =

German brewery

Bavaria – St. Pauli Brewery (Bavaria - St. Pauli - Brauerei AG) was a German brewery founded in 1922 from the merger of Bavaria Brauerei AG (founded 1897) and St. Pauli Actien-Brauerei (founded 1862) in Hamburg. Its brands are now brewed by Holsten.

== History ==
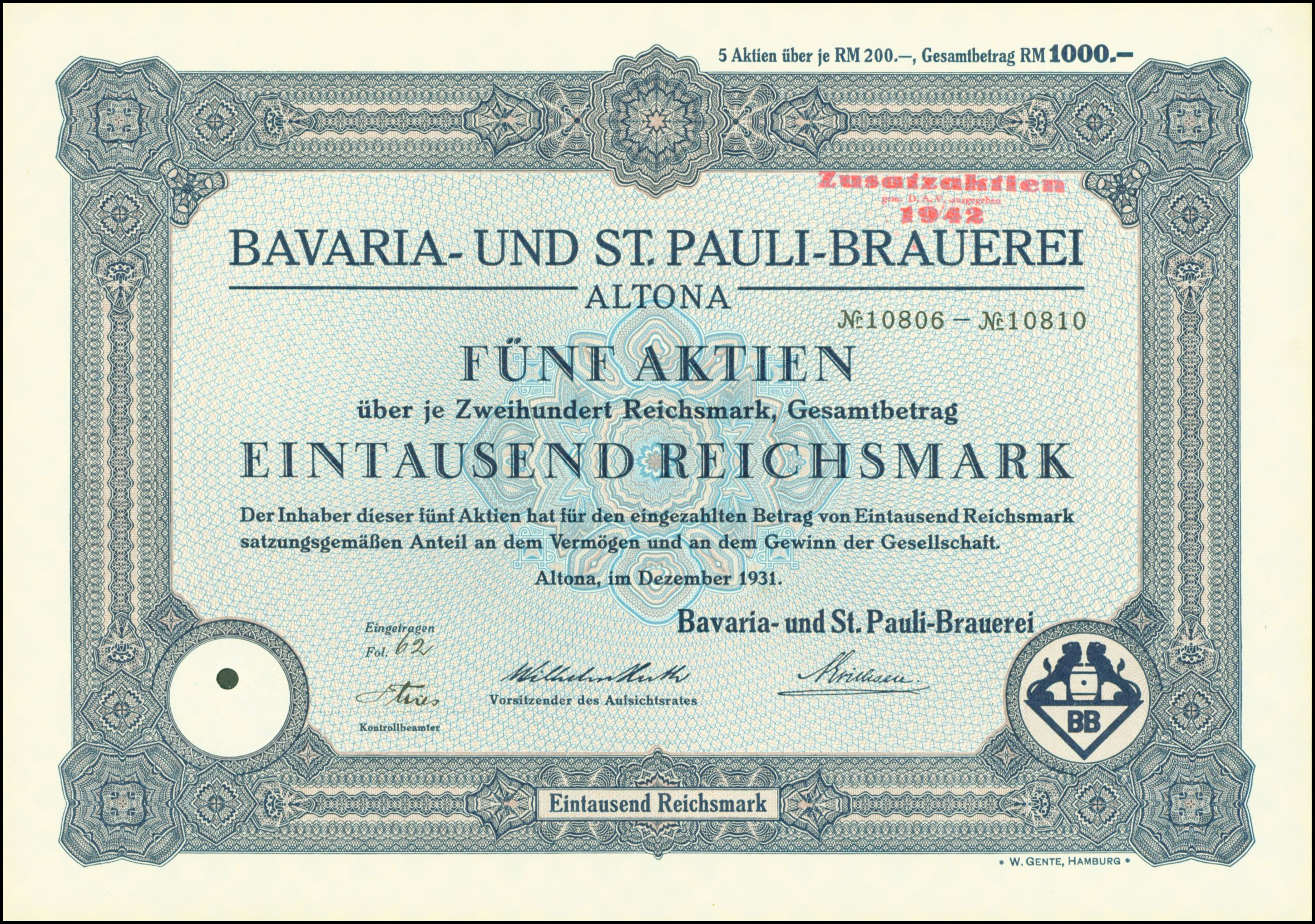
Share of the Bavaria- und St. Pauli-Brauerei, issued December 1931

Founded in 1922 from the merger of two older breweries, Bavaria - St. Pauli bought up a dozen North German breweries until Brau und Brunnen bought the brewery in 1994, merging it with Elbschloss-Brauerei GmbH.

In January 1998 the city of Hamburg bought the brewery as it was under threat of closure. In December 1998 Hamburg sold the brewery on to Holsten, the city's other major brewer, who closed the brewery in 2003. The former Bavaria-St. Pauli brewery building has since been demolished.

== Astra ==
Astra is the brand name of a series of pale lagers, including:

- Astra Urtyp (alc. 4.9% vol.)
- Astra Exclusiv (alc. 4.9% vol.)
- Astra Pilsener (alc. 4.9% vol.)
- Astra Rotlicht (alc. 6.0% vol.); Rotlicht is the German expression for red light, in reference to Hamburg's iconic Reeperbahn district
- Astra Original Hamburger Alsterwasser (alc. 2,5% vol.) (shandy)
