= Lübz =

Town in Mecklenburg-Vorpommern, Germany

- Town
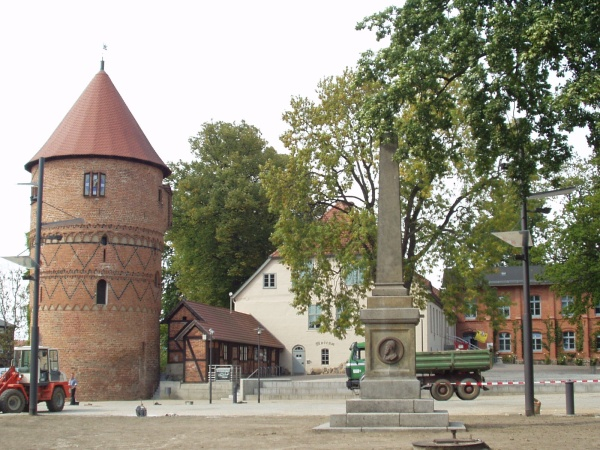
- Municipal tower in Lübz

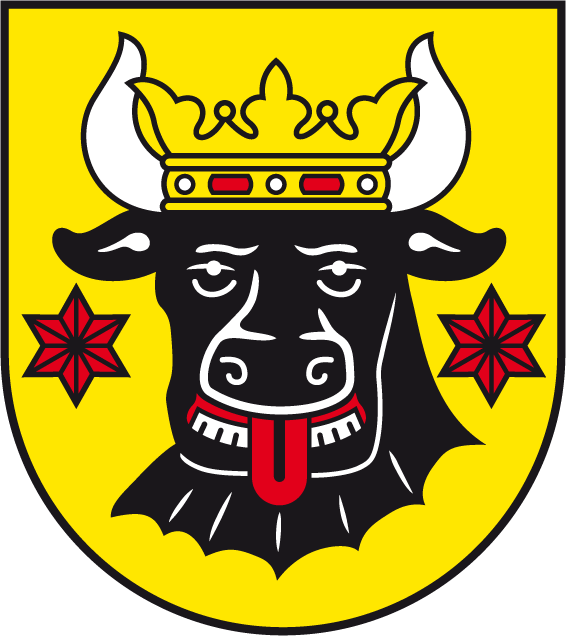
- Coat of arms

- Location of Lübz within Ludwigslust-Parchim district
- Interactive map of Lübz
- Location within Germany Location within Mecklenburg-Vorpommern
- Coordinates: 53°27′47″N 12°01′42″E
- Country: Germany
- State: Mecklenburg-Vorpommern
- District: Ludwigslust-Parchim
- Municipal assoc.: Eldenburg Lübz

Government
  - Mayor: Astrid Becker

Area
  - Total: 74.69 km^{2} (28.84 sq mi)
- Elevation: 50 m (160 ft)

Population (2025-12-31)
  - Total: 5,869
  - Density: 78.58/km^{2} (203.5/sq mi)
- Time zone: UTC+01:00 (CET)
  - Summer (DST): UTC+02:00 (CEST)
- Postal codes: 19386
- Dialling codes: 038731
- Vehicle registration: PCH
- Website: www.luebz.de

Lübz (German pronunciation: [lʏpts]) is a town in the Ludwigslust-Parchim district, in Mecklenburg-Western Pomerania, in north-eastern Germany. It is situated on the river Elde, 12 kilometres (7.5 mi) northeast of Parchim.

== History ==
The first mention of Lubicz comes from 1224. The name is of Lechitic origin. It was granted town rights after 1456.

During World War II, in February 1945, a German-perpetrated death march of Allied prisoners-of-war from the Stalag XX-B POW camp passed through the town.

The former municipality Gischow was merged into Lübz in May 2019.

== Economy ==
It is home to the Mecklenburgische Brauerei Lübz, the largest local employer and one of the larger regional breweries.

== Notable people ==
- Johan Ludvig Holstein (1694–1763), Danish minister of state
- Ludwig Brunow (1843 in Lutheran - 1913), sculptor.
- Wilhelm Ahrens (1872–1927), mathematician
- Otto-Heinrich Drechsler (1895–1945), Nazi politician who instigated the Holocaust in Latvia
- Wolfgang Greese (1926–2001), actor
- Manfred Knebusch (born 1939), mathematician
- Hanna Gienow (born 1943), Hamburg-area politician (CDU)
- Karin Strenz (1967–2021), politician (CDU)

=== Sport ===
- Gerd Wessig (born 1959), German high jumper, gold medallist at the 1980 Summer Olympics
- Gerald Weiß (1960–2018), German javelin thrower
- René Dettweiler (born 1983), prizefighter, former boxer.

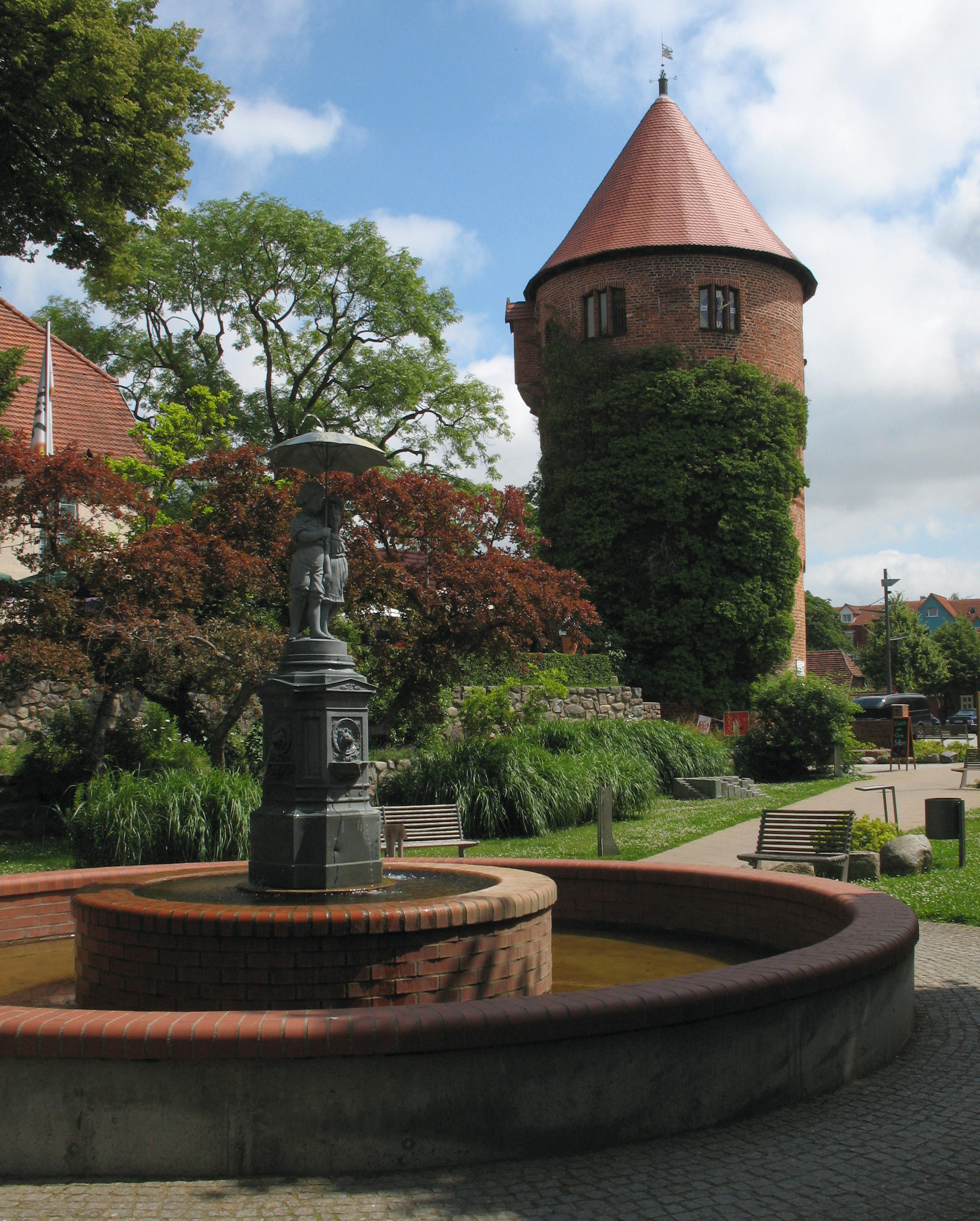
Fountain by sculptor Christian Genschow and defence tower
