= Steinhagen, North Rhine-Westphalia =

Steinhagen
- Municipality
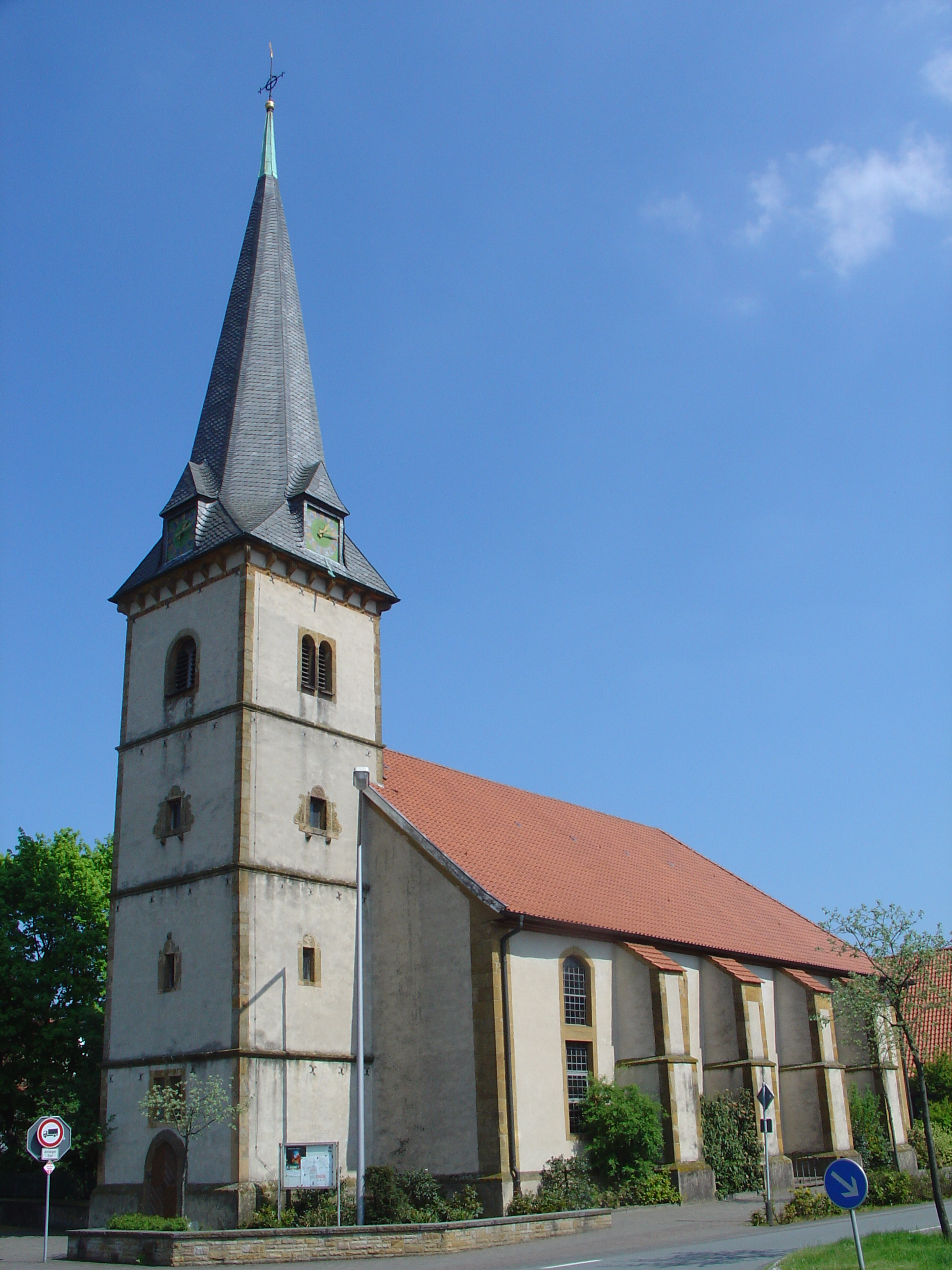
- St. Georg in Brockhagen, a part of the municipality of Steinhagen

- Flag Coat of arms

- Location of Steinhagen within Gütersloh district
- Interactive map of Steinhagen
- Location within Germany Location within North Rhine-Westphalia
- Coordinates: 52°00′18″N 08°24′53″E
- Country: Germany
- State: North Rhine-Westphalia
- Admin. region: Detmold
- District: Gütersloh
- Subdivisions: 3

Government
  - Mayor (2020–25): Sarah Süß (SPD)

Area
  - Total: 56.41 km^{2} (21.78 sq mi)
- Elevation: 99 m (325 ft)

Population (2025-12-31)
  - Total: 20,251
  - Density: 359.0/km^{2} (929.8/sq mi)
- Time zone: UTC+01:00 (CET)
  - Summer (DST): UTC+02:00 (CEST)
- Postal codes: 33803
- Dialling codes: 05204
- Vehicle registration: GT
- Website: www.gemeinde-steinhagen.de

Steinhagen (German pronunciation: [ˈʃtaɪnhaːɡn̩]) is a municipality in the district of Gütersloh in the state of North Rhine-Westphalia, Germany. It is located on the south slope of the Teutoburg Forest, approx. 10 km west of Bielefeld and 15 km north of Gütersloh. The village is well known for producing Schnaps made from juniper berries which are distilled three times. The Schnaps is called Steinhäger or Schinkenhäger and can be clear or dark when unfiltered.

== Geography ==
Steinhagen is in the Ems River basin on the southern slopes of the Teutoburg Forest, which runs through the northwestern portion of the municipality. This mountain range is the eastern boundary of the Munsterland and of the Westphalian Bay. Steinhagen's highest point is 306 meters above sea level. The Kotte pond is 70 meters at the deepest. The city of Bielefeld is 10 km to the west and Gütersloh is 15 km to the south.

== Population ==
Historical population

Year	Pop.	±% p.a.
1965	13,725	—
1970	14,426	+1.00%
1975	15,771	+1.80%
1980	16,220	+0.56%
1985	16,056	−0.20%
1990	17,303	+1.51%
1995	18,591	+1.45%

Year	Pop.	±% p.a.
2000	19,619	+1.08%
2005	19,902	+0.29%
2010	19,766	−0.14%
2015	20,749	+0.98%
2020	20,495	−0.25%
2025	20,251	−0.24%

Source: Landesdatabank Nordrhein-Westfalen
