= Holsten Brewery =

German brewing company

Coordinates: 53°33′43″N 9°56′35″E

Holsten
- Interactive map of Holsten
- Location: Hamburg, Germany
- Opened: 1879
- Annual production volume: 12.9 million hectolitres (11,000,000 US bbl)
- Owned by: Carlsberg Group
- Website: holsten-pilsener.de

Active beers
Pilsener, Pilsener alcohol-free, Bernstein Lager, Export, Extra, Edel
Name	Type

Holsten Brewery (Holsten-Brauerei AG) is a brewing company founded in 1879 in what is now Hamburg's Altona-Nord quarter. The group now has seven breweries in Germany. Its nationally distributed premium brand is the pale lager Holsten Pilsener. The company was acquired by the Carlsberg Group in 2004.

== History ==
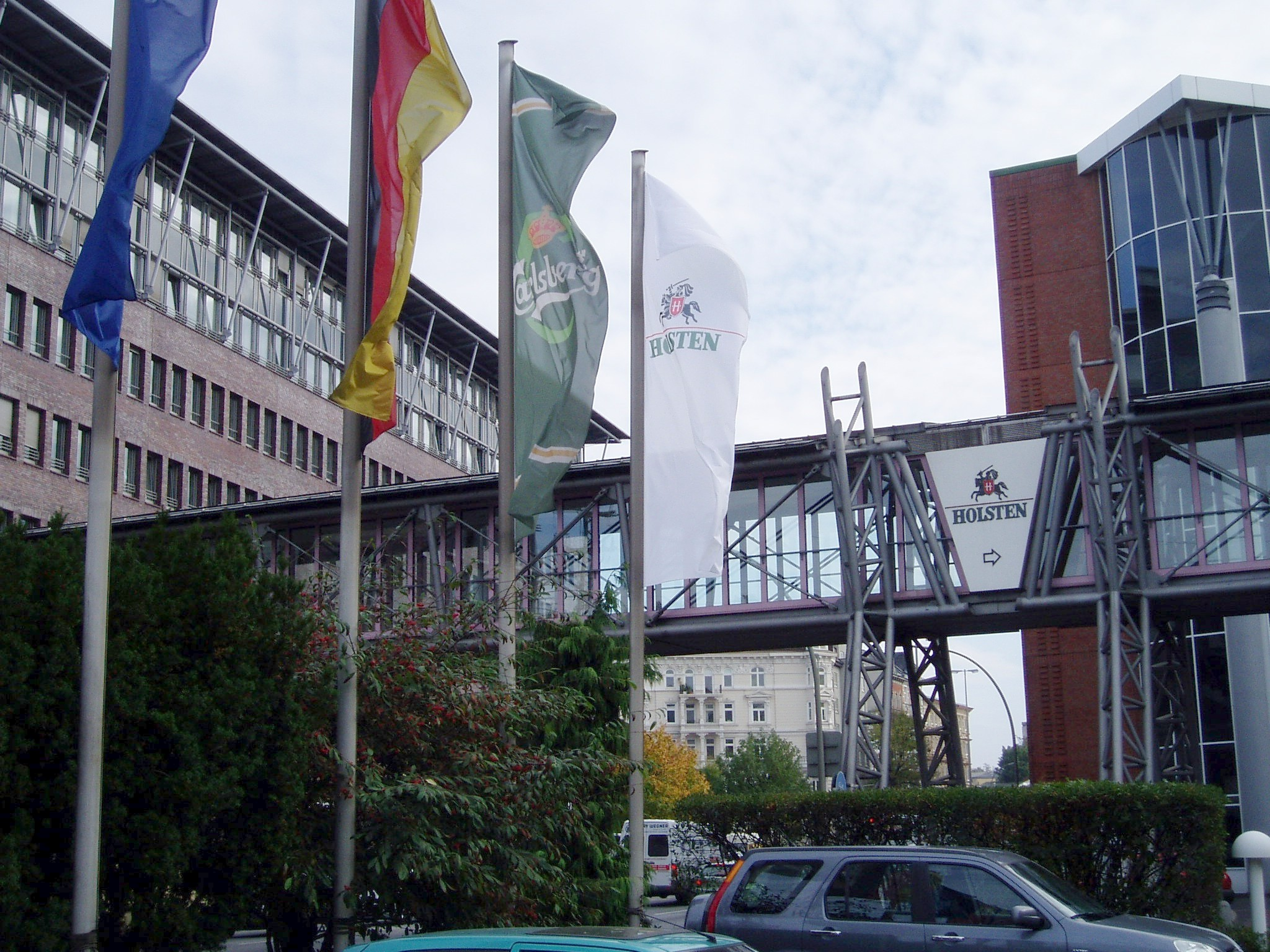
Headquarters

In 1902, Holsten Brauerei bought the Union Brewery, Point Pleasant, Wandsworth on the south bank of the River Thames in London. Trade suffered from anti-German sentiment during the First World War and it closed in 1920. Holsten Pils was first imported into the UK in 1952, creating the premium packaged lager market. In 1979 the first of many award-winning TV ad campaigns was launched featuring actor Donald Pleasence and in the mid-1980s Holsten became the UK's number one selling premium packaged lager. In 1991, Holsten acquired the Mecklenburgische Brauerei Lübz. Until 1999, Holsten UK operated as a joint venture between Holsten Brauerei and Scottish & Newcastle, but in that year the joint venture was dissolved and Holsten UK took over responsibility for the on-trade, followed in 2000 by the off-trade.

In 2003, Holsten Brewery absorbed the Bavaria – St. Pauli Brewery with their main brand Astra. The Holsten group subsidiary Hansa-Brunnen AG has two plants producing mineral water and carbonated soft drinks, mainly for distribution in northern Germany.

The present-day Holsten brewery in Altona has a production capacity of 3.2 million hectolitres (2,700,000 US bbl). Its biggest-selling product is the premium brand Holsten Pilsener sold on the German market. The beers exported by the Holsten group are also brewed in Altona.

In 2004, Holsten-Brauerei was acquired by Carlsberg for £735 million. Holsten produces both Tuborg and Carlsberg for the German market.

Holsten is specially produced in Germany (since 1879), but it may be produced by other Carlsberg companies around the world.

On 6 November 2014, there was a strike at the brewery with 200 employees involved.

== Beers ==
Holsten Pils is a 5% abv pale lager first produced in 1953. The Hamburg brewery exports beer to the whole world. Holsten Premium is sold in five continents and Holsten Pils goes to the United Kingdom where it is sold through the group's subsidiary, Carlsberg UK.

Holsten Export is a 5.2% ABV pilsner.

Holsten Extra Herb is a 5.0% ABV pilsner. More hops are added at the beginning and end of the brewing process for a tarter taste.

Holsten Bernstein Lager is a 4.6% ABV amber lager.

Holsten Edel ("Noble") is a 4.8% ABV pilsner. It is mostly sold in 330-ml stubby bottles.

Holsten Diät Pils ("Diet Pilsner") is a 4.9% ABV light pilsner formulated especially for diabetics. The brew is fermented longer, thereby leaving no residual sugars.

Holsten Radler ("Cyclist") is a 2.5% ABV shandy made with a 50/50 mixture of pilsner beer and lemon-lime soft drink. It is unavailable in markets where pre-mixed alcoholic beverages are banned.

Holsten Alkoholfrei ("Alcohol-Free") is a non-alcoholic 0.0% ABV pilsner.

Holsten Fassbrause Zitrone ("Keg Soda – Lemon") is a non-alcoholic shandy that is made with a 70/30 mixture of lemon-flavored soft drink and non-alcoholic pilsner beer. It is a niche product sold almost exclusively in Northern European markets. It is sold in 330-ml bottles in six-packs and 500-ml cans.

Holsten Maibock is a 7.0% ABV strong, golden dark lager.

Holsten Festbock is a 7.0% ABV strong, amber dark lager.

== Advertising ==
Holsten sponsored Tottenham Hotspur football team from 1983 to 1995, and again from 1999 until 2002. They were sponsors of Tottenham at the time of their last FA Cup win in 1991. They were also the title sponsor of Premier League Darts in 2006 and 2007. Holsten sponsored a men's lacrosse club in Boston, MA from 1990-1993.
