= Beer in Albania =

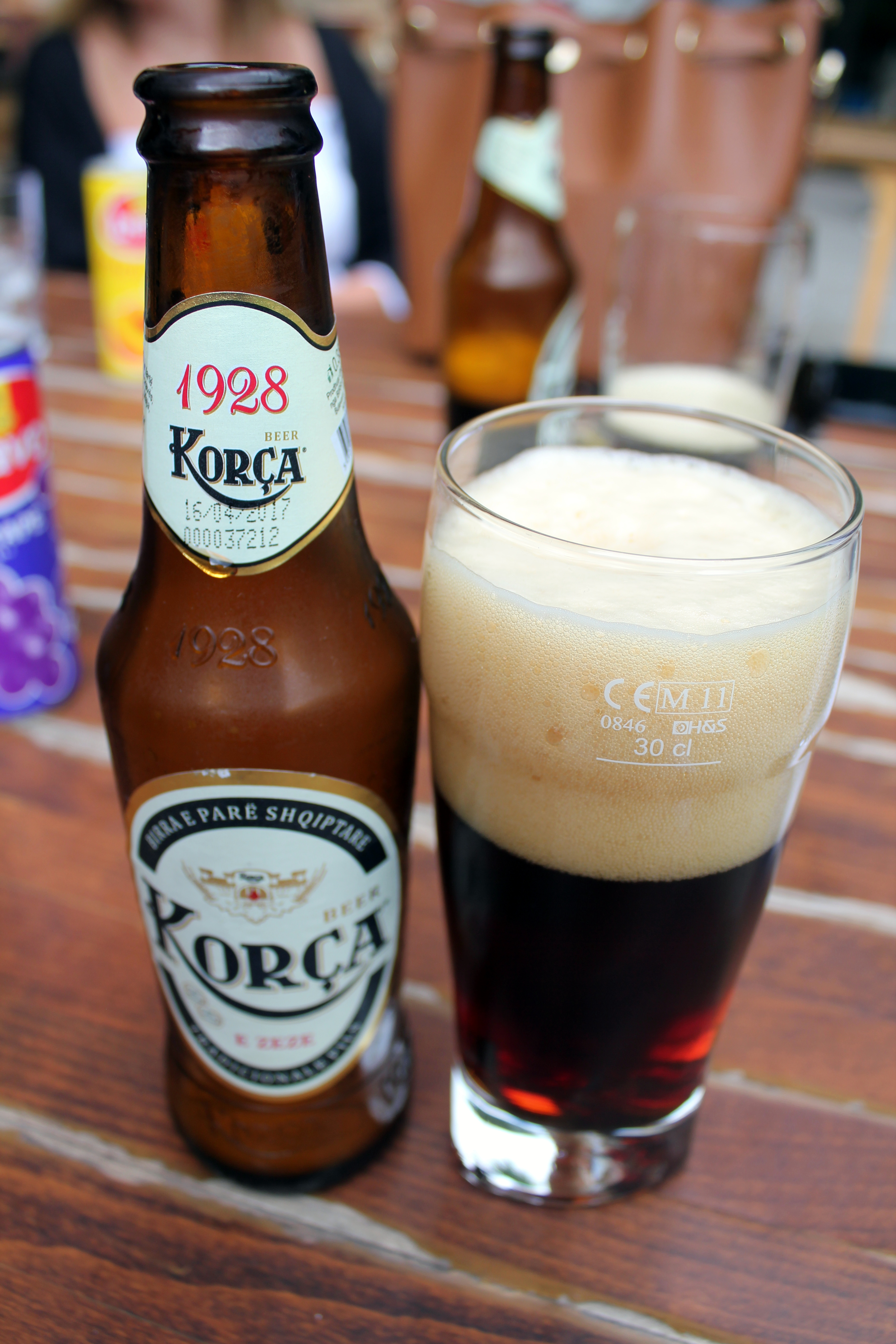
Birra Korça in dark ale

Beer in Albania has been produced on a commercial scale since the early 20th century. The country has a diverse brewing industry comprising major established breweries, regional producers and a growing craft beer sector. Beer remains among the most widely consumed alcoholic beverages, with pale lager being the dominant style.

== History ==
According to historical accounts cited in Albanian reference works, the ancient Illyrian tribe of the Taulantii brewed fermented mead from honey must, regarded as an early precursor to beer. Throughout the Middle Ages, beer remained relatively uncommon, while wine and grape-based spirits dominated alcohol consumption.

Industrial brewing in Albania began in Korçë with the establishment of the country’s first commercial brewery in 1928. Production commenced shortly thereafter, with an initial annual output of about 12,000 hectolitres, marking the beginning of the country’s brewing industry.

After World War II, the brewing sector was brought under state ownership. The Korçë brewery underwent a major reconstruction in 1956, increasing its production capacity more than fourfold. A second major brewery was established in Tirana in 1960, equipped with modern brewing technology. Further expansions were carried out at the Korçë brewery in 1967 and at the Tirana brewery in 1971 and 1981. By 1984, Albania’s annual beer production had risen to approximately 161,000 hectolitres, representing a substantial increase compared with production levels from the 1950s.

During communism, beer production was confined to a small number of state-operated breweries. Economic reforms in the early 1990s led to the privatization of the sector and the creation of more than thirty privately owned breweries.

Today, Albania’s brewing industry is led primarily by domestic companies, with pale lager remaining the dominant style. Imported beers also hold a significant share of the market. Among the country’s best-known brands are Birra Korça, Birra Tirana, Stela, Kaon, Elbar and Norga.

== Craft brewing ==
Beginning in the late 2010s, Albania saw the emergence of a small but expanding craft beer movement. Independent microbreweries diversified the domestic market by producing a variety of styles beyond traditional pale lagers, which included India pale ales (IPAs), wheat beers, porters and stouts.

One of the most distinctive local ingredients used by Albanian craft brewers is the dandelion leaf (gjethe qumështore), a wild herb related to milk thistle that grows throughout the country’s mountainous regions. It is occasionally incorporated into ales to impart a subtle earthy bitterness and a distinctive regional character. Other locally sourced ingredients, including mountain sage, wild thyme and honey, are also used in a variety of beers, particularly wheat beers and blonde ales, where their delicate aromas and flavors complement rather than overpower the malt and hop profile.

The growth of craft brewing has coincided with the rise of dedicated beer bars and taprooms, particularly in urban areas, driven by increasing consumer demand for locally produced, small-batch and experimental beers.

== Beer culture ==
Beer is widely consumed in restaurants, cafés and bars throughout Albania and is especially popular during the summer tourist season.

Beer festivals have become an important feature of Albania’s cultural and tourism calendar. The largest and best known festival – Korça Beer Fest – is held annually since 2007, attracting tens of thousands of visitors from Albania and neighbouring countries. The festival combines beer tasting with live music, traditional cuisine and cultural performances.
