= Malto Brewery =

Brewery in Albania

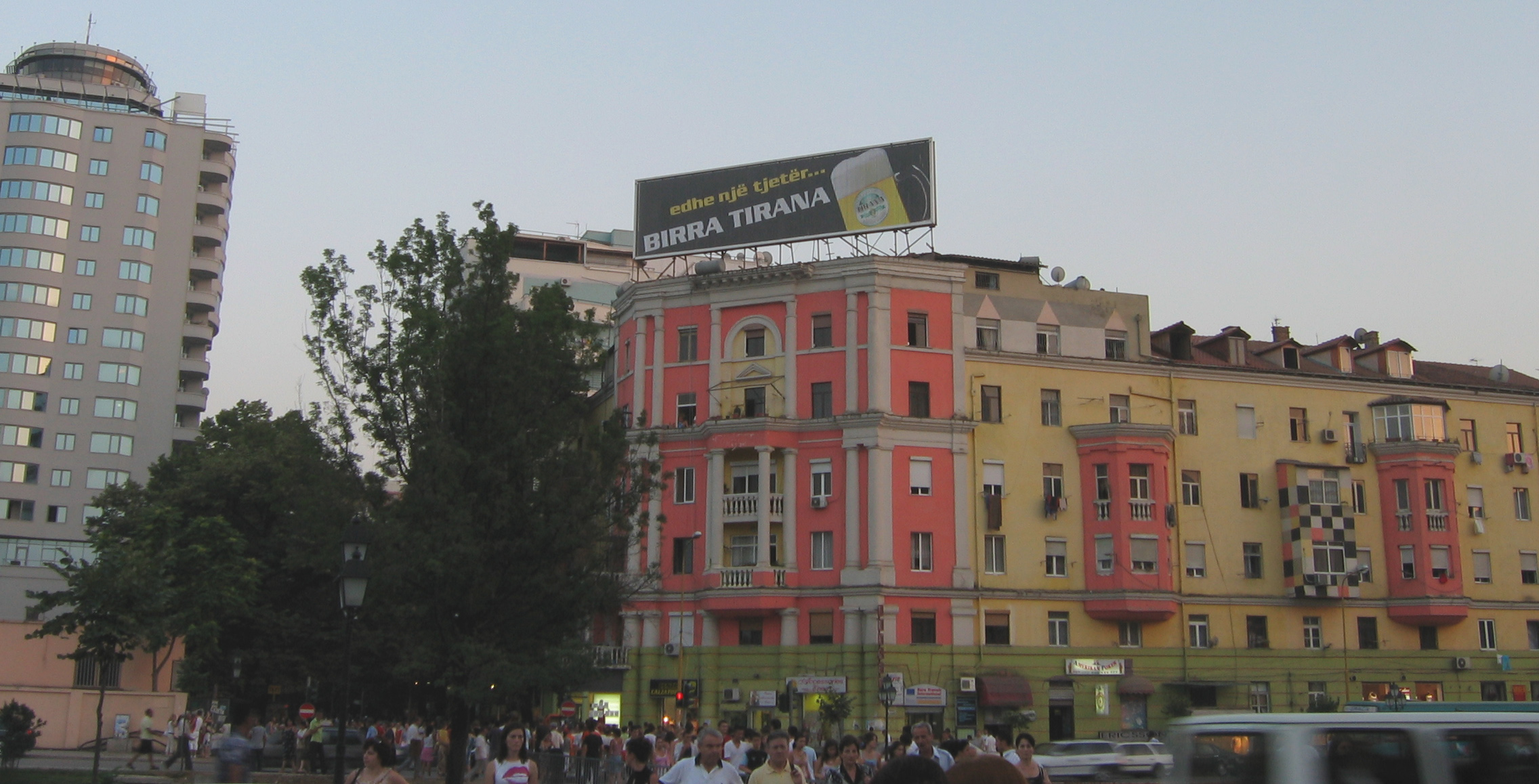
An Advertisement for Birra Tirana in downtown Tirana

Malto Brewery is a brewery in Albania. The company sells a pilsener beer under the Birra Tirana brand, named after the capital, Tirana, where the beers are brewed. It was first produced in 1961 by the Kombinati Ushqimor (a state agency). The beer contains 4.5% alcohol.

Malto Brewery was privatised in 2001. The company used to produce 5,000 tons a year prior to the privatisation, while it is currently producing around 13,000 tons, with exports going to Kosovo and the United States. Birra Tirana accounts for a large percentage of all beer sold in Albania, up to 30% by some accounts, making it one of the most widely distributed products made in Albania.

== History ==
The production of the beer in Albania began in 1938, with a capacity of around 8,000 HL per year. In these years the beer was known only a little bit by Albanians, because the traditional drinks were wine and brandy. After the Second World War, Albania began to build the grocery industry, which was imported generally from the countries of ex-socialist camps.

In 1960 Birra Tirana was constructed as a factory with a capacity 70,000 HL/year, with Russian production technology. The first specialists were qualified in the Soviet Union. It produced both blone and dark beer in 0.5L bottles, in woody cases and a 50L butt. Birra Tirana has been a component part of ex-Grocery Combine "Ali Kelmendi".

Together with the beer factory, a malt production facility was built, which until 1983, provided malt to the beer factory. Barley was produced primarily in the zone of Korçë, while hops were cultivated in Pogradec. The water used for the production of the beer has always been from the Selitas fountains. As a result of the increased market demand for beer, in 1983, Birra Tirana was reconstructed, increasing its capacity to 150,000 HL/year. Technology was improved with the addition of German and Swedish machinery.

Inasmuch as, in this period, there was a centralised economy, Birra Tirana was distributed in 2/3 of the country, except the south-east part of Albania, that was furnished by Birra Korça. After the year 1983, around 50 percent of malt began to be imported. Together with the change in the political climate, including the liberalisation of the market, different beers were imported from neighbouring countries. As result of the image of these products as well as economic downturn, political and social chaos, the production and the sales in 1990–1992, fell by 4 percent. As result of the reform of economic decentralisation, that the Albania Government undertook, the grocery combine "Ali Kelmendi" was disintegrated in some separately establishments and the factory of Birra Tirana, passed as an independent establishment, with distinctive balance, registering under the name The establishment of the Production of Birra Malty, but the product's brand did not change.

In 1993, with the grant of BE, via the Phare programme, were claimed 1,000,000 ECU, for the furniture with raw material (malt, hops), packages (bottles, cases), and also exchanges for the brush up to work of this factory. Birra Tirana began to compete successfully in market and its financial condition began to improve, creating such incomes, that not only liquidate in the state budget the fund about 100,000 ECU, but even accomplishing further investments with machinery in Germany, for the filling line, packing, grinding, CO_{2} gas, filtration, furnaces, compressors for refrigeration, and even the lines of circulation of the beer and brine, all in steel.

In this period was paid a special attention to the Marketing and to the analysis of the market in particular, with the help of the English specialists, Dutch and German. On the basis of this analysis, Birra Tirana created its strategy, improving evidently the image in market, via packing, publicity and promotion improvement, the enlargement of the distribution canal all over Albania, even competing with lower prices than import. Also the security standard was increased for the consumers, growing the long-life of this beer six months to one year via tunnel pasteurisation. The establishment of the production of Malt Beer, passed in Albania with limited liability (Sh.p.k).

Meanwhile, in 2000, it returned to the shareholder fellowship "Birra Malt" Sh.a, with its capital 100% state-owned. This was a step forward in its denationalisation. It can be said that, in the strategy pursued by the Albanian state against Birra Tirana, the idea that the denationalisation of establishments in Albania would be more efficient won out, putting them in efficiency and not destroying them.

In 2001, "Birra Malt" Sh.a was denationalised by ten Albanian shareholders. The ten shareholders had 96 percent of the shares, 2% the owner of the terrain and 2% of the workers. With its reorganisation, and the breath, that brought the ten main shareholders, which had a long successful experience with their business, about the alteration of the work mentality and all these followed by business plans and by clear strategy of development, "Birra Tirana" has stated its goal to become the main beer in the Albania market. It is not traded only in Albania, but in Kosovo and America. This leap as consequence of the enlargement of the dimensions of the market, escaping the geographic confines of a strictly Albanian market, abandoning the idea that the market of Birra Tirana should be only Albanian.

The Hysenbelliu Group, led by Irfan Hysenbelliu, became the largest shareholder of the company in 2020.

== See also ==
- Birra Stela
