= Hysenbelliu =

Hysenbelliu is an Albanian surname. Notable people with the surname include:

- Fatmir Hysenbelliu (born 1992), Albanian footballer
- Irfan Hysenbelliu (born 1959), Albanian businessman
- Kasem Hysenbelliu (born 1961), Albanian businessman, philanthropist, intellectual
