= Bernard Hours =

French businessman (born 1956)

- Born: 5 May 1956 (age 70); Strasbourg, France
- Education: HEC Paris
- Occupation: COO of Danone (2008-2014)

Bernard Hours, born on 5 May 1956 in Strasbourg, is a French businessman. He was the managing director of Danone and a member of the board of directors of the company. He was also a member of the executive committee of Danone.

== Education ==
Hours graduated from the École des Hautes Études Commerciales (HEC) in 1978.

== Career ==
Hours began his career at Unilever in 1979 as Product Manager and Brand Manager. He progressively became an expert in the food sector.

In 1985, he joined the Danone marketing group at Kronenbourg. From 1989 and 2001, he was the Director of Sales of Evian, and then Director of Marketing for Danone France, later becoming the President of Danone Hungary (1994), Danone Germany (1996) and finally President of LU France in 1998.

In November 2001, Hours was named the Vice-President of the Fresh Dairy Products division and became the President in March 2002. In November 2006 he also took charge of the Research and Development at Danone.

Hours contributed significantly to sales growth between 2007 and 2013, which amounted to an increase of 36.4% (from 14 to 22 billion euros) during this period. He exercised is responsible for all activities of Danone, encompassing around 100,000 people in and 100 countries.

In 2014, at the time of a change of governance, Hours ended his position as managing director of Danone, by the decision of the Administrative Counsel.

In 2015, Hours became president of Medvet and Chef Sam. He is also Board Member for Verlinvest and Oatly.

== Other Activities ==
Hours is a member of the Administrative Counsel of Essilor as an independent director and a member of the Administrative Counsel of the investment holding Verlinvest and its participation Vita Coco. He is also e member of the Supervisory Board of Somfy.
