= Élise Fischer =

French writer, journalist and novelist (1948–2023)

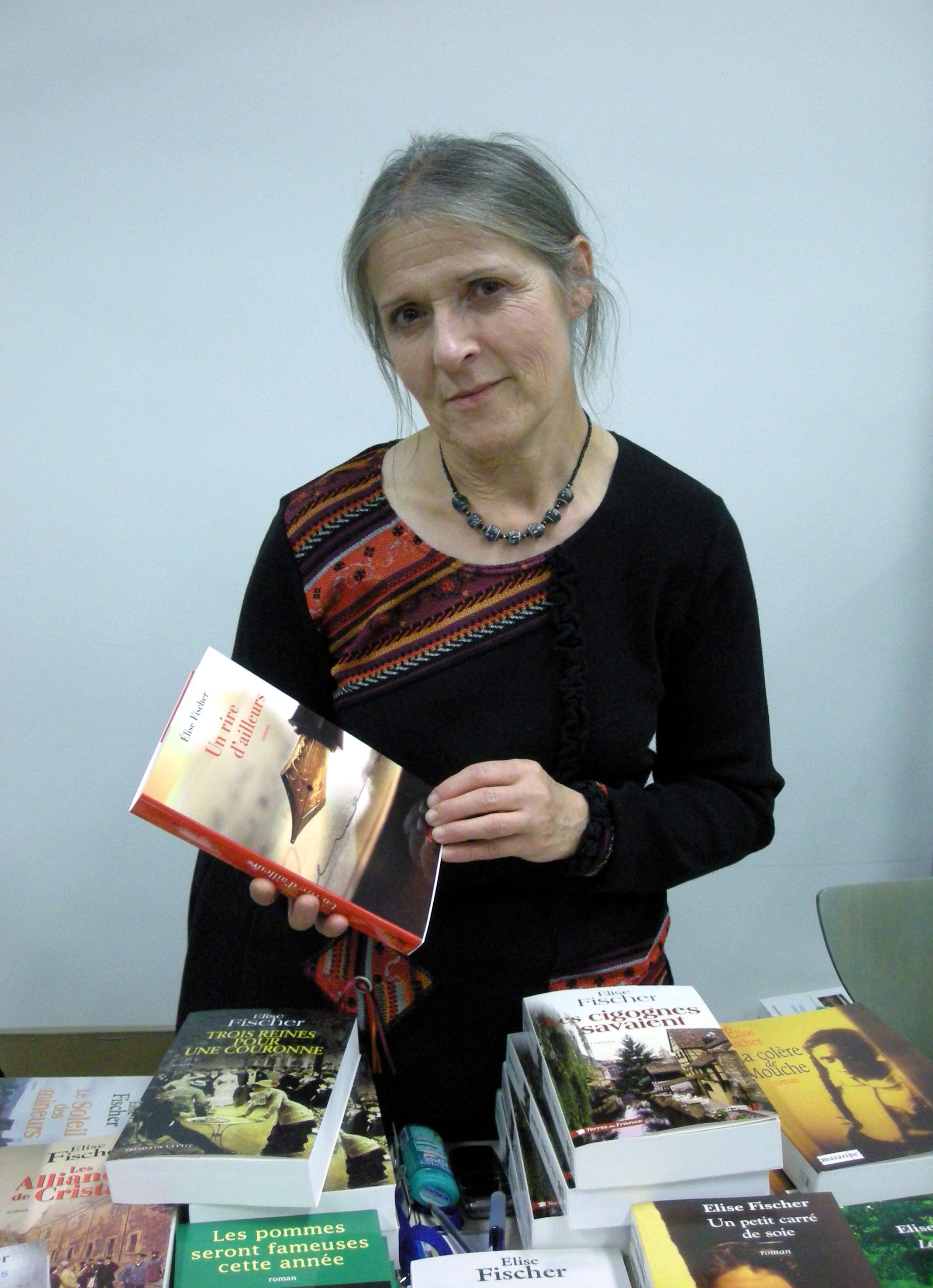
- Fischer in 2008
- Born: 13 July 1948; Champigneulles, France
- Died: 25 December 2023 (aged 75); France
- Occupation: Novelist

Élise Fischer (13 July 1948 – 25 December 2023) was a French writer, journalist and novelist from Lorraine.

== Biography ==
Élise Fischer was born in Champigneulles, Meurthe-et-Moselle on 13 July 1948, the daughter of a father from Lorraine and a mother from Alsace.

In 1984 she worked as a journalist for two titles of the Christian written press, France catholique and Panorama, but also for Radio Notre-Dame. She subsequently produced and hosted the literary program Au fil des pages on RCF.

Fischer worked with the Bayard Presse group from 1992. Among her novels, several essays are devoted to children's rights. In 2007 she returned to Lorraine and settled there.

Fischer died on 25 December 2023, at the age of 75.

== Works ==
- 1988: Les Enfants de l'apartheid, Fayard
- 1989: Feu sur l'enfance, Fayard
- 1998: La Colère de Mouche, Éditions Mazarine
- 2000: L'Inaccomplie, Mazarine
- 2000: Les pommes seront fameuses cette année, Mazarine
- 2001: Trois reines pour une couronne, Presses de la Cité
- 2002: Le Dernier Amour d'Auguste, Fayard
- 2003: Les Alliances de cristal, Presses de la Cité
- 2003: Un petit carré de soie, Fayard
- 2004: Mystérieuse Manon, Presses de la Cité
- 2005: Nous, les derniers mineurs : l'épopée des Gueules noires, hors collection (in collaboration with Camille Oster)
- 2005: Le Soleil des mineurs, Presses de la Cité
- 2006: L'Enfant perdu des Philippines, Collection Sud Lointain, Presses de la Cité
- 2006: Les cigognes savaient, Presses de la Cité
- 2007: Appelez-moi Jeanne, Fayard
- 2007: Le Roman de la Place Stanislas, Place Stanislas Éditions
- 2008: La Lorraine au cœur. Promenade à travers l'histoire et les paysages, Place Stanislas Éditions
- 2008: Confession d'Adrien le colporteur, Presses de la Cité
- 2008: Un rire d’ailleurs, Fayard
- 2009: Quand je serai grand, Fayard
- 2009: Le Secret du Pressoir, Presses de la Cité
- 2010: Sous les mirabelliers, Presses de la Cité
- 2010: Les Noces de Marie-Victoire, Calmann-Lévy
- 2010: Le Rêve de la Grenouille, Presses de la Cité
- 2011: Les Larmes et l'espoir with Geneviève Senger, Presses de la Cité
- 2012: Les Amours de la Grenouille, Presses de la cité
- 2013: Au péril de la vérité, Presses de la Cité
- 2013: Je jouerai encore pour nous, Calmann-Lévy
- 2014: La Tante de Russie, Presses de la Cité
- 2014: Villa Sourire, Calmann-Lévy
- 2015: L’Étrange Destin de Marie, Calmann-Lévy
- 2016: Le Jardin de Pétronille, Calmann-Lévy
- 2016: Sur le Fil, Presses de la Cité

=== Books for youth ===
- 2008: Meurtre au Village du Livre, l'Oxalide.
- 2012: Madeleine et le dessert du roi Stanislas, illustration Amélie Dufour, Feuilles de menthe, collection Le thé aux histoires
- 2013: Si la bergamote m'était contée : le bonbon soleil, illustrations Jude Leppo, Le Verger des Hespérides

=== In collaboration ===
- 1991: Pour les enfants du monde, collective work under the direction of professor Alexandre Minkowski, Éditions n°1/UNICEF/MPLEM
- 2003: L'Appel de Lunéville : Pour la Résurrection du Versailles lorrain, collective work under the direction of François Moulin and Michel Vagner, éditions de l'Est Républicain/La Nuée Bleue
- 2007: Paroles d'auteurs – La Lorraine – Photographs Pascal Bodez, collective work with the support of Conseil Régional de Lorraine, Serge Domini, éditeur
- 2009: Les plus belles Saint-Nicolas en Lorraine, under the direction of Marie-Hélène Colin, Place Stanislas éditions
- 2009: Les plus beaux Noëls d'Alsace, under the direction of Michel Loetscher, Place Stanislas éditions
- 2010: Si Champigneulles m'était conté, parwork directed by an 11th-grade scholl of Champigneulles, Le Verger des Hespérides éditions

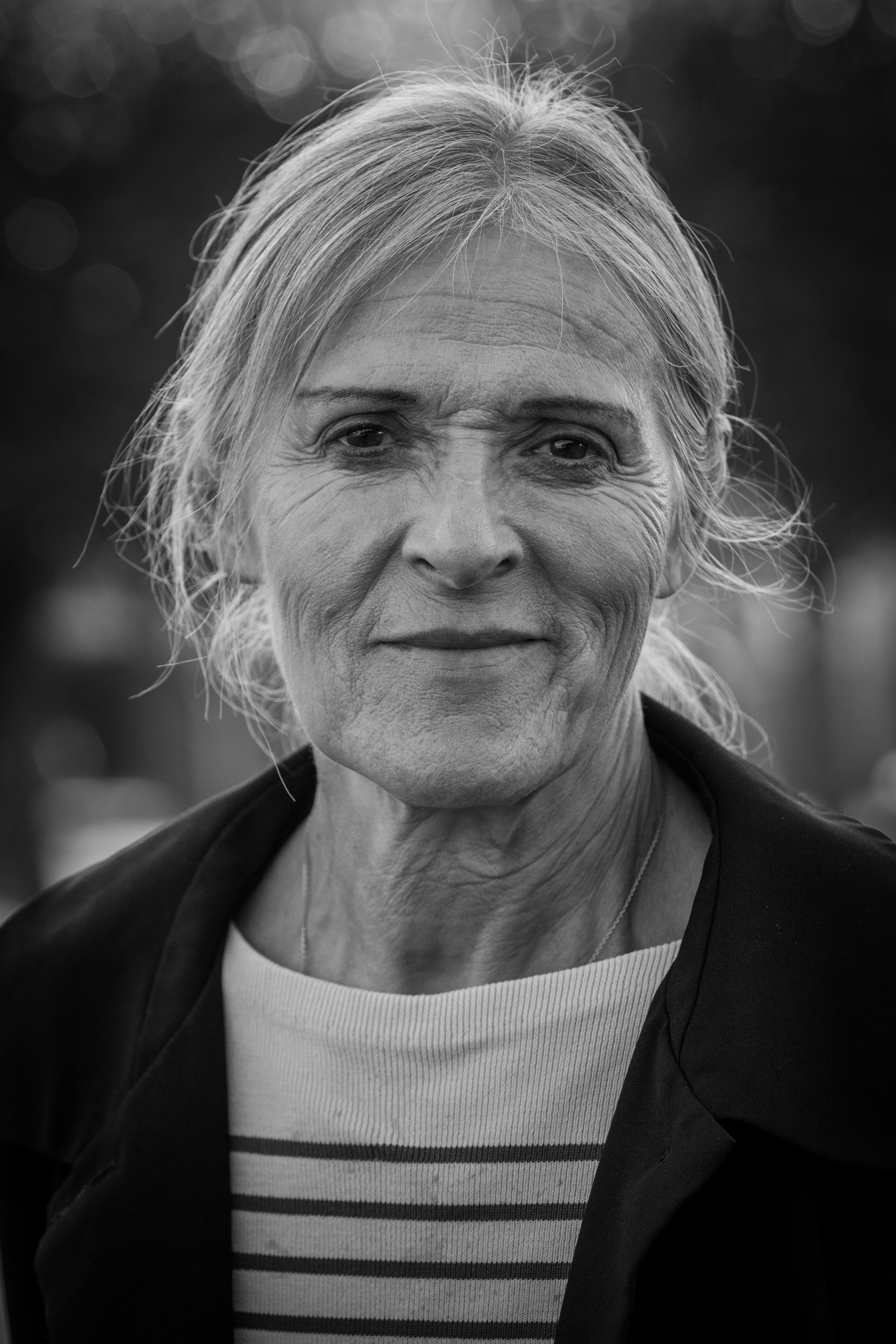
Fischer in 2014

== Distinctions ==
- 2001: Feuille d'or de la ville de Nancy for L'Inaccomplie
- 2004: Prix de l'Association Le printemps du Livre lorrain for Mystérieuse Manon
- 2005: Prix des Conseillers généraux de la région lorraine for Le soleil des Mineurs
- 2005: Prix Victor Hugo pour Le soleil des Mineurs
- 2007: Mention spéciale du prix des Écrivains Croyants for Appelez-moi Jeanne
- 2010: Prix Prouvé de Nancy for Quand je serai grand

== Bibliography ==
- Michel Caffier, Dictionnaire des littératures de Lorraine, Serpenoise, 2003, p. 383 ISBN 2876925699
