= Birra Norga =

Beer company in Albania

- Type: Beer
- Manufacturer: A&B Grup sh.p.k.
- Origin: Albania, Vlorë
- Introduced: 1999; 27 years ago
- Alcohol by volume: 4.6%
- Colour: Golden
- Style: Malt lager

Birra Norga is an Albanian beer brand produced by A&B Grup sh.p.k. in Vlorë. Introduced in 1999, the brand was initially brewed under license in Italy by Birra Moretti before production was transferred to Albania, in 2003. Norga is marketed as a premium 100% malt lager and at one point, had become the country’s fifth largest beer producer.

== History ==
The origins of the company date to 1991, when it operated under the name Vranishti sh.p.k. and began distributing Kruna beer from North Macedonia under an exclusive agreement for the Albanian market.

Throughout the 1990s, A&B Grup expanded its portfolio through a series of exclusive distribution partnerships with international breweries. It became the Albanian distributor for Kronenbourg, followed in 1994 by Birra Moretti. In that same year, it represented Castelberg Italia in managing the distribution of the Carlsberg and Splügen brands in the country. Additional distribution agreements followed with Dreher in 1997, the Dutch beer Grolsch in 1998 and Bavaria in 1999.

Norga beer was introduced in 1999 and was brewed for the Albanian market at the Birra Moretti brewery in San Giorgio di Nogaro, for approximately four years.

In 2003, production was transferred to the newly built Norga brewery in Vlorë. The brewery implemented Italian, Swiss and Austrian brewing technology to produce Norga Premium, a 100% pure malt lager marketed under the slogan "Enjoy it to the last drop" (Albanian: Shijoje deri në pikën e fundit).

Within a few years, the brand became widely distributed throughout Albania and expanded into neighbouring markets including Kosovo, Montenegro and North Macedonia.

The brewery has participated in numerous trade fairs, where its beers have received awards for quality and taste.

On 30 May 2007, Norga merged with the fruit juice producer Gerfrut, which had been established four years prior. The merger resulted in the formation of A&B Grup sh.p.k., with Agron Haxhiraj, founder of KF Vlora football club, appointed as the company’s legal representative.
