= Arboretum de Bellefontaine =

Arboretum in Lorraine, France

Coordinates: 48.72155°N 6.1328°E

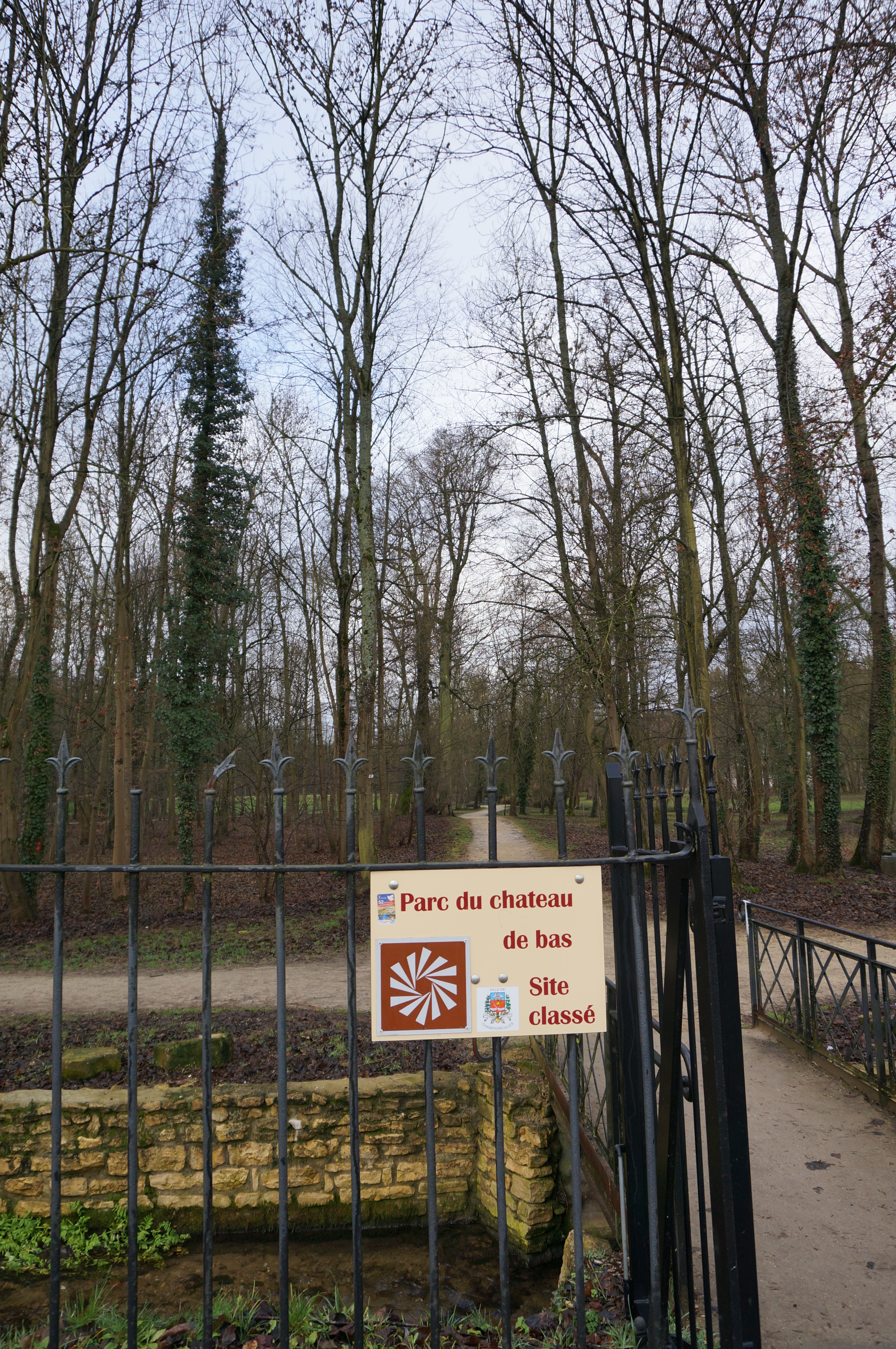
View of the lower castle park, entrance with bridge over the Bellefontaine.

The Arboretum de Bellefontaine (French pronunciation: [aʁbɔʁetɔm də bɛlfɔ̃tɛn]; 13 hectares) is an arboretum located in Champigneulles, Meurthe-et-Moselle, Lorraine, France. It contains specimens of beech, birch, chestnut, ginkgo, maple, oak, pine, sequoia, and spruce.

== See also ==
- List of botanical gardens in France
