= Geneviève Senger =

French children's book author and novelist

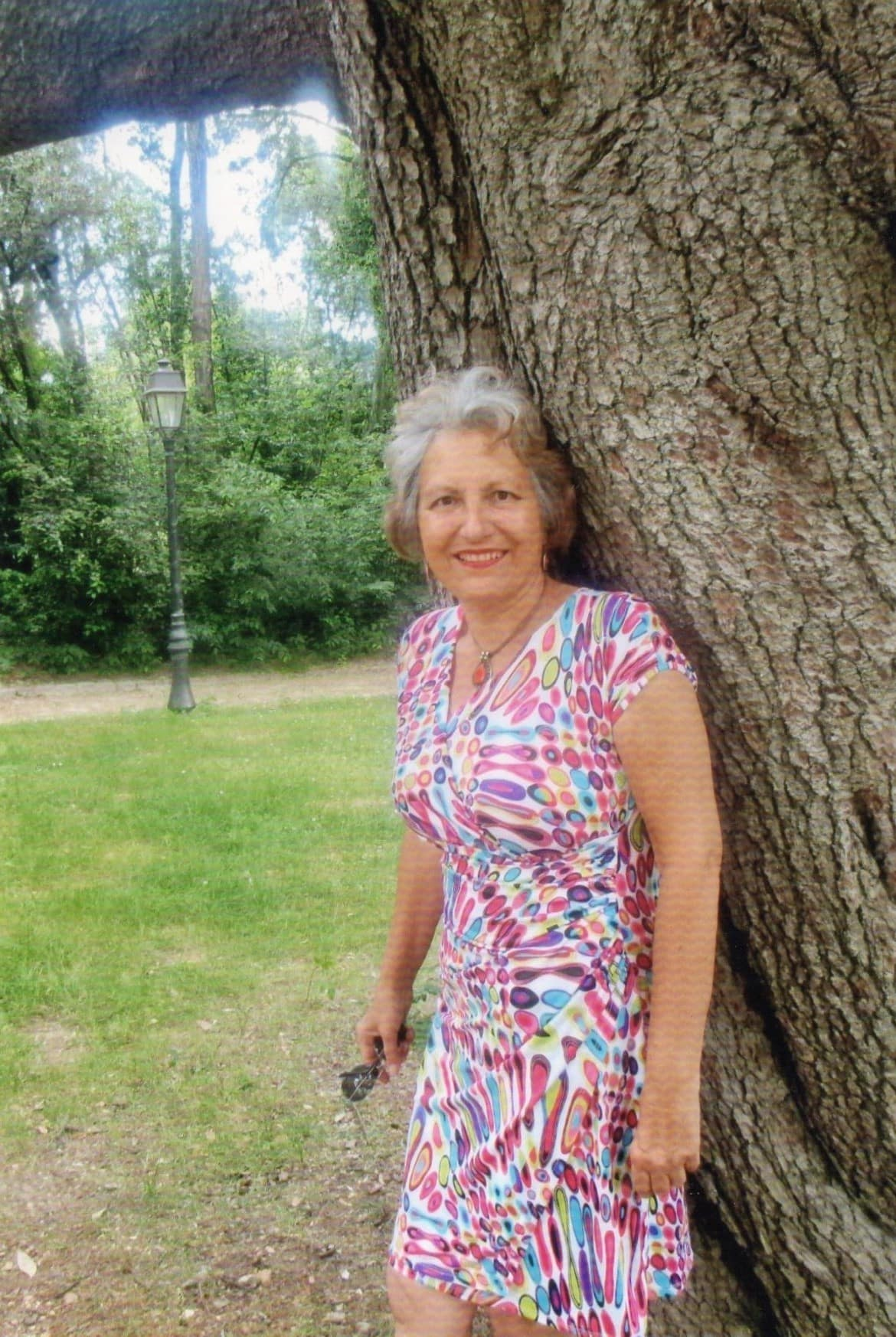
- Born: Mulhouse, France
- Occupation: Novelist
- Writing career
- Pen name: J. Esther Singer
- Language: French

Geneviève Senger (born 1956 in Mulhouse) is a French children's book author and novelist.

== Works ==
- La Guerre des marrons, Toulouse, France, Éditions Milan, ill. d’Alfred Morera, series "Zanzibar" 1993, 229 p. ISBN 2-86726-909-1
- L’Été de toutes les cerises, ill. by Sylvie Montmoulineix, Paris, Nathan, series "Bibliothèque internationale", 1993, 125 p. ISBN 2-09-240341-9
- Une vallée prisonnière, Toulouse, France, Éditions Milan, ill. by Jean-Louis Henriot, series "Zanzibar", 1995, 151 p. ISBN 2-84113-288-9
- Destination macadam, ill. by Thierry Daniel, Paris, Hachette jeunesse, series "Verte aventure : aventure humaine", 1995, 125 p. ISBN 2-01-209347-7
- B comme Béatrice, ill. by Anne Romby, Paris, Éditions Rageot, series "Cascade", 1995, 156 p. ISBN 2-7002-2313-6
- Les Patates magiques, ill. by Thierry Christmann, Paris, Éditions Rageot, series "Cascade", 1996, 92 p. ISBN 2-7002-2399-3
- Le Manoir invisible, ill. by Philippe Chauvet, Tournai, Belgium, Casterman, series "Romans Casterman huit et plus : comme la vie", 1997, 103 p. ISBN 2-203-11757-5
- Quand j’aurai un grand frère, Paris, Éditions Syros jeunesse, series "Mini souris sentiments", 1998, 29 p. ISBN 2-84146-537-3
- Seuls à la maison, ill. by Thierry Christmann, Paris, Éditions Rageot, series "Cascade", 1999, 121 p. ISBN 2-7002-2571-6
- Le Cigogneau, Paris, Éditions Flammarion, 1999, 191 p. ISBN 2-08-067669-5
- Une grosse dispute, ill. by Thierry Christmann, Paris, Éditions Rageot, series "Cascade", 2000, 59 p. ISBN 2-7002-2660-7
- Le chat qui voulait dire la vérité et autres fables d'’Israël, ill. by Marie Mathieu, Paris, Éditions ER jeunesse, series "Fables et légendes d'Israël", 2000, 64 p. ISBN 2-911783-48-4
- Tous les jours en vacances, ill. by Christian Maucler, Paris, Éditions Rageot, series "Cascade", 2001, 117 p. ISBN 2-7002-2732-8
- Dis-moi qui tu aimes, Paris, Éditions Bayard jeunesse, series "Cœur grenadine", 2001, 117 p. ISBN 2-7002-2732-8
- Mon premier euro de poche, ill. by Camille Meyer, Paris, Éditions Rageot, series "Cascade", 2002, 44 p. ISBN 2-7002-2778-6
- L’Ile du premier amour, Paris, Éditions Bayard jeunesse, series "Cœur grenadine", 2003, 144 p. ISBN 2-7470-0503-8
- Une histoire entre sœurs, Paris, Éditions J’ai lu jeunesse, series "J'ai lu. Jeunesse : journal", 2003, 93 p. ISBN 2-290-32881-2
- Moi, j’aime gagner, with Philippe Diemunsch, Paris, Éditions Flammarion, series "Castor cadet", 2003, 44 p. ISBN 2-08-161425-1
- L’Ennemi de cœur, ill. by Karen Laborie, Champigny-sur-Marne, France, Éditions Lito, series "Moi, j'aime les romans", 2004, 136 p. ISBN 2-244-45823-7
- Chut ! Les enfants parlent, ill. by Pierre Bailly, Champigny-sur-Marne, France, Éditions Lito, series "Moi, j'aime les romans", 2004, 89 p. ISBN 2-244-45821-0
- La Plus Belle Lettre d'amour, ill. by Karen Laborie, Champigny-sur-Marne, France, Éditions Lito, series "La collec' des filles", 2004, 138 p. ISBN 2-244-44203-9
- Meurtre au lycée, Paris, Éditions Rageot, series "Heure noire", 2004, 153 p. ISBN 2-7002-2909-6
- La Voix de son maître, Paris, Éditions de la Martinière, 2006, 286 p. ISBN 2-84675-155-2
- Trois sœurs dans un appartement, T1, Lola, ill. by Aline Bureau, Champigny-sur-Marne, France, Éditions Lito, series "La collec' des filles", 2005, 136 p. ISBN 2-244-44210-1
- L’Inconnue de la chambre 313, Paris, Éditions Rageot, series "Heure noire", 2005, 184 p. ISBN 2-7002-2955-X
- Trois sœurs dans un appartement, T2, Marylou, ill. by Aline Bureau, Champigny-sur-Marne, France, Éditions Lito, series "La collec' des filles", 2005, ISBN 2-244-44213-6
- Mon amoureux du bout du monde, Paris, Éditions Pocket Jeunesse, series "Toi + moi = cœur", 2005, 155 p. ISBN 2-266-14216-X
- Trois sœurs dans un appartement, T3, Alice, ill. by Aline Bureau, Champigny-sur-Marne, France, Éditions Lito, series "La collec' des filles", 2006, 144 p. ISBN 2-244-44217-9
- Vive la mode!, ill. by Yann Hamonic, Paris, Éditions Rageot, series "Cascade", 2006, 154 p. ISBN 2-7002-3188-0
- La Disparue du canal, Paris, Éditions Rageot, series "Heure noire", 2006, 151 p. ISBN 978-2-7002-3130-4
- La Mémoire du lièvre, Paris, Éditions Pygmalion, series "Suspense", 2007, 306 p. ISBN 978-2-7564-0105-8
- Regarde-moi !, Paris, Éditions Oskar jeunesse, series "Junior", 2010, 200 p. ISBN 978-2-35000-510-2
- Les Larmes et l’Espoir, with Élise Fischer, Paris, Les Presses de la Cité, 2011, 423 p. ISBN 978-2-258-08504-6
- Pour te venger, Joy, Paris, Éditions Oskar jeunesse, series "Junior", 2011, 188 p. ISBN 978-2-35000-644-4
- Un cœur entre deux rives, Paris, Les Presses de la Cité, series "Terres de France", 2012, 343 p. ISBN 978-2-258-09103-0
- La Maison Vogel, Paris, Éditions Calmann-Lévy, series "France de Toujours et d'Aujourd'hui", 2013, 441 p. ISBN 978-2-7021-4397-1
- L’Enfant de la Cerisaie, Paris, Éditions Calmann-Lévy, series "France de Toujours et d'Aujourd'hui", 2014, 416 p. ISBN 978-2-7021-4473-2
- Le Fil d’or, Paris, Éditions Calmann-Lévy, series "France de Toujours et d'Aujourd'hui", 2015, 650 p. ISBN 978-2-7021-5467-0
- La Dynastie des Weber, Paris, Éditions Calmann-Lévy, series "France de Toujours et d'Aujourd'hui", 2015, 816 p. ISBN 978-2-7021-5467-0
- Les Jumeaux du Val d’amour, Paris, Éditions Calmann-Lévy, series "France de Toujours et d'Aujourd'hui", 2016, 360 p. ISBN 978-2-7021-5802-9
- La Promesse de Rose, Paris, Éditions Calmann-Lévy, series "France de Toujours et d'Aujourd'hui", 2017, 360 p. ISBN 978-2-7021-5952-1
- La Dame des Genêts, Paris, Éditions Calmann-Lévy, coll. « France de Toujours et d'Aujourd'hui », 2018, 528 p. ISBN 978-2-7021-6321-4
- Meurtres aux Épicéas, De Borée, 2018, 160 p. ISBN 978-2-8129-3489-6
- Les Bellanger, Paris, Éditions Calmann-Lévy, coll. « France de Toujours et d'Aujourd'hui », 2018, 490 p. ISBN 978-2-7021-6141-8
- L’Air de l’espoir, Presses de la cité, 2019, 416 p. ISBN 978-2-2581-5055-3
- L’Or de Salomé, Paris, Éditions Calmann-Lévy, coll. « France de Toujours et d'Aujourd'hui », 2019, 416 p. ISBN 978-2-7021-6502-7; Sélection du livre du Reader's Digest, 2020, ISBN 978-2-7098-2818-5
- La Première Amie, Presses de la cité, 2020, 360 p. ISBN 978-2-2581-6328-7
- La Terre originelle, Paris, Éditions Calmann-Lévy, coll. « Territoires », 2020, 320 p.ISBN 978-2-7021-6896-7
- Le premier amour est-il éternel ?, Presses de la cité, 2021, 272 p. ISBN 978-2-2581-9388-8
- Le bonheur est au fond des vallées, Calmann-Lévy, 2022, 320 p. ISBN 978-2-7021-8402-8
- La fille d'Omaha Beach, Presses de la cité, 2023, 384 p. ISBN 978-2-2582-0142-2
- La Terre était si bleue, Calmann-Lévy, 2024, 200 p. ISBN 978-2-7021-8524-7
- Une maison à elles, Calmann-Lévy, 2025, 344 p. ISBN 978-2-7021-9055-5
- Quand le merle chantera, Calmann-Lévy, 2025, 350 p. ISBN 978-2-7021-9343-3
- Le Sang des pivoines, Calmann-Lévy, 2026, 600 p. ISBN 978-2-7021-9614-4
