= Champigneulles =

- Commune
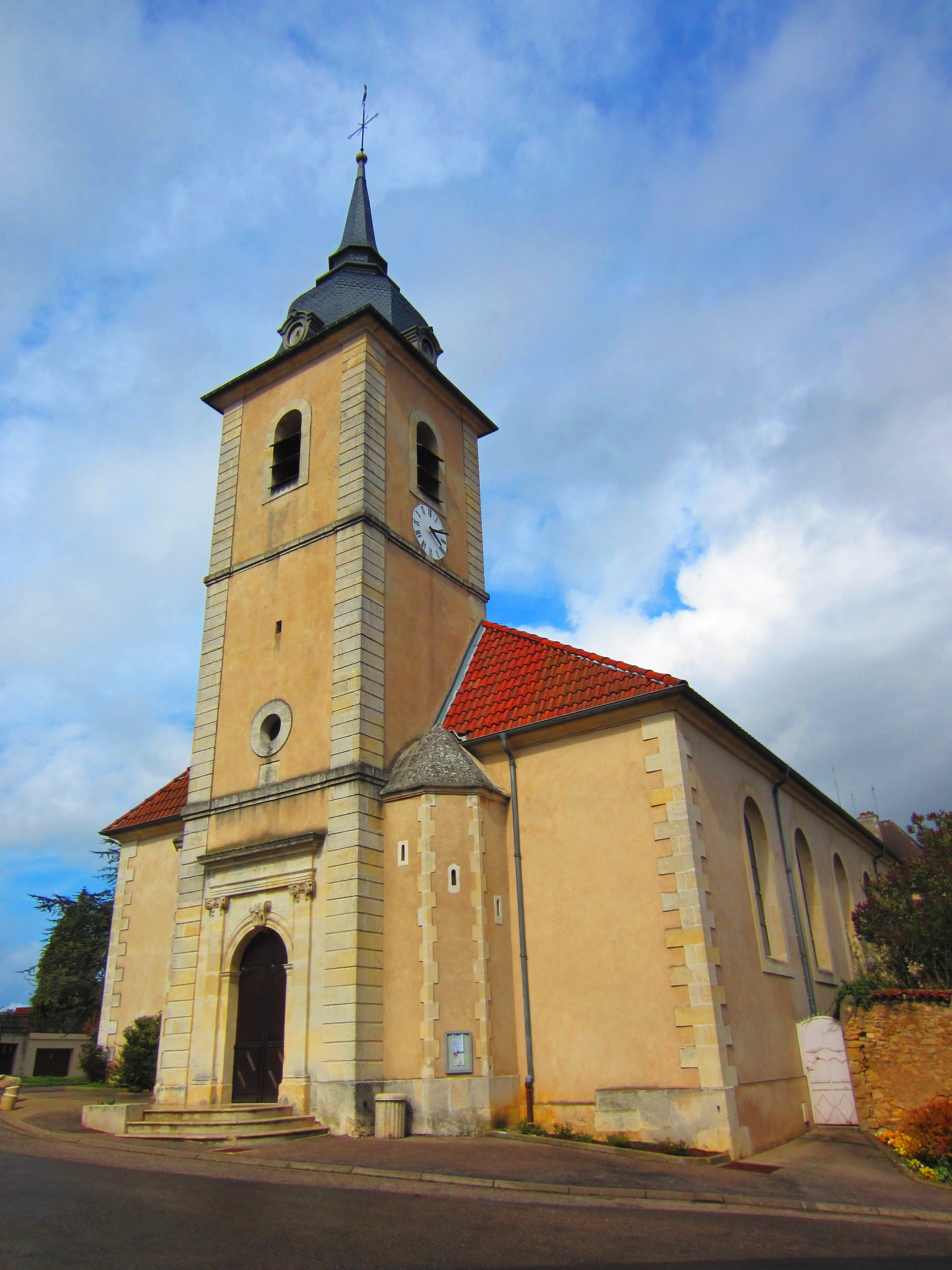
- The church in Champigneulles

- Coat of arms
- Location of Champigneulles
- Location within France Location within Grand Est
- Coordinates: 48°44′03″N 6°09′55″E
- Country: France
- Region: Grand Est
- Department: Meurthe-et-Moselle
- Arrondissement: Nancy
- Canton: Val de Lorraine Sud
- Intercommunality: CC du Bassin de Pompey

Government
  - Mayor (2020–2026): Valentin Dethou
- Area^{1}: 23.99 km^{2} (9.26 sq mi)
- Elevation: 199 m (653 ft)
- Highest elevation: 364 m (1,194 ft)
- Lowest elevation: 186 m (610 ft)
- Population (2023): 6,551
  - Density: 273.1/km^{2} (707.3/sq mi)
- Time zone: UTC+01:00 (CET)
  - Summer (DST): UTC+02:00 (CEST)
- INSEE/Postal code: 54115 /54250
- ^{1} French Land Register data, which excludes lakes, ponds, glaciers > 1 km^{2} (0.386 sq mi or 247 acres) and river estuaries.

Champigneulles (French pronunciation: [ʃɑ̃piɲœl]) is a commune in the Meurthe-et-Moselle department in north-eastern France.

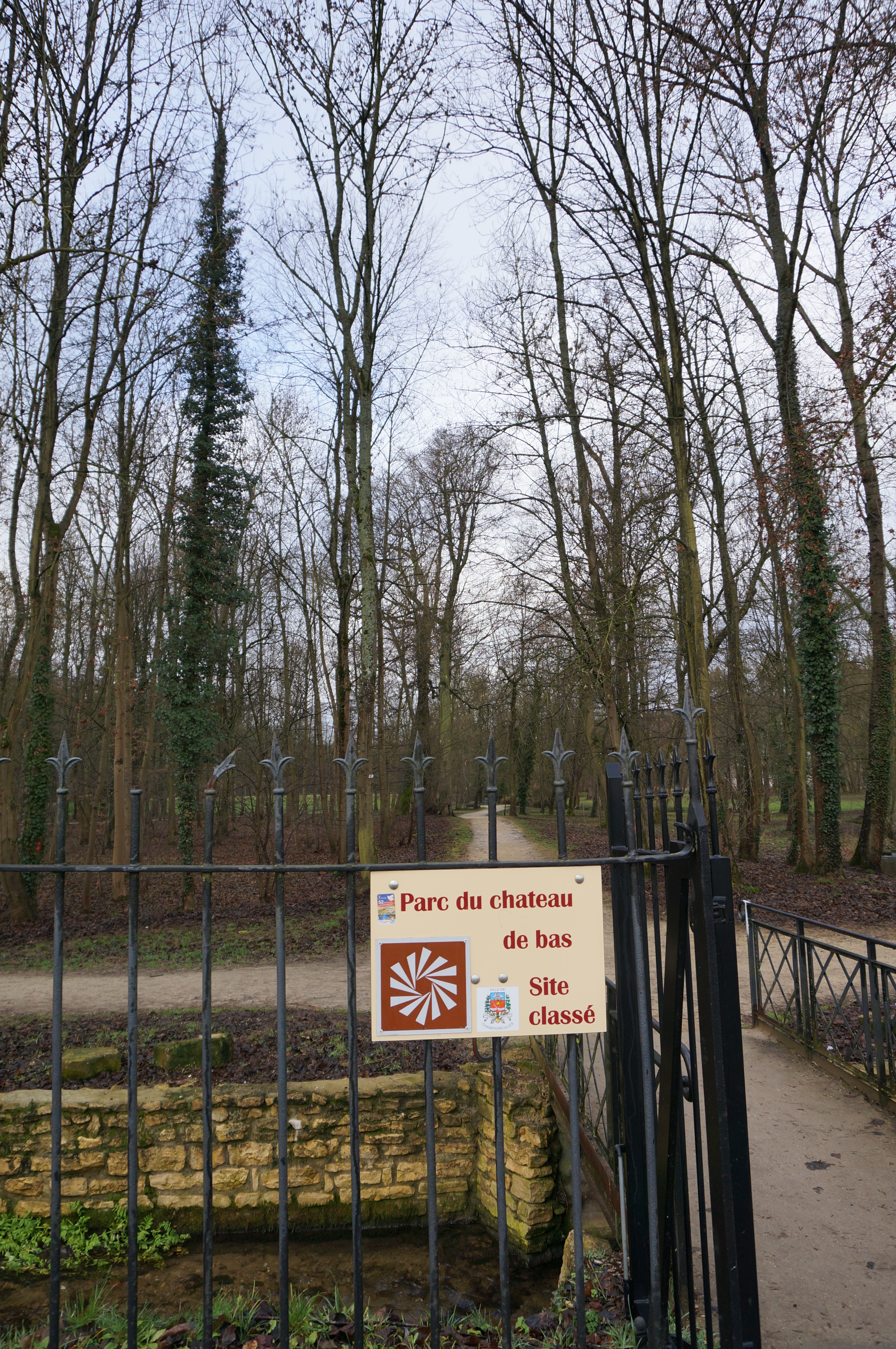
Arboretum de Bellefontaine

It is home to the Arboretum de Bellefontaine.

The Champigneulles brewery, founded on 20 June 1897, was for a long time the most important production site of the Société Européenne de Brasserie (SEB), which owned more than twenty production sites in France. In 1987 SEB merged with Kronenbourg Brewery. In 2006 Kronenbourg sold the site to Frankfurter Brauhaus, a German brewery in Frankfurt an der Oder.

The writer and author Élise Fischer was born in Champigneulles.

== Population ==
Historical population
Year	Pop.	±% p.a.
1968	5,484	—
1975	5,992	+1.27%
1982	7,919	+4.06%
1990	7,541	−0.61%
1999	7,172	−0.56%
2007	6,765	−0.73%
2012	6,884	+0.35%
2017	6,745	−0.41%
2023	6,551	−0.49%
Source: INSEE

== See also ==
- Communes of the Meurthe-et-Moselle department
