= 1664 (beer) =

French golden pale lager

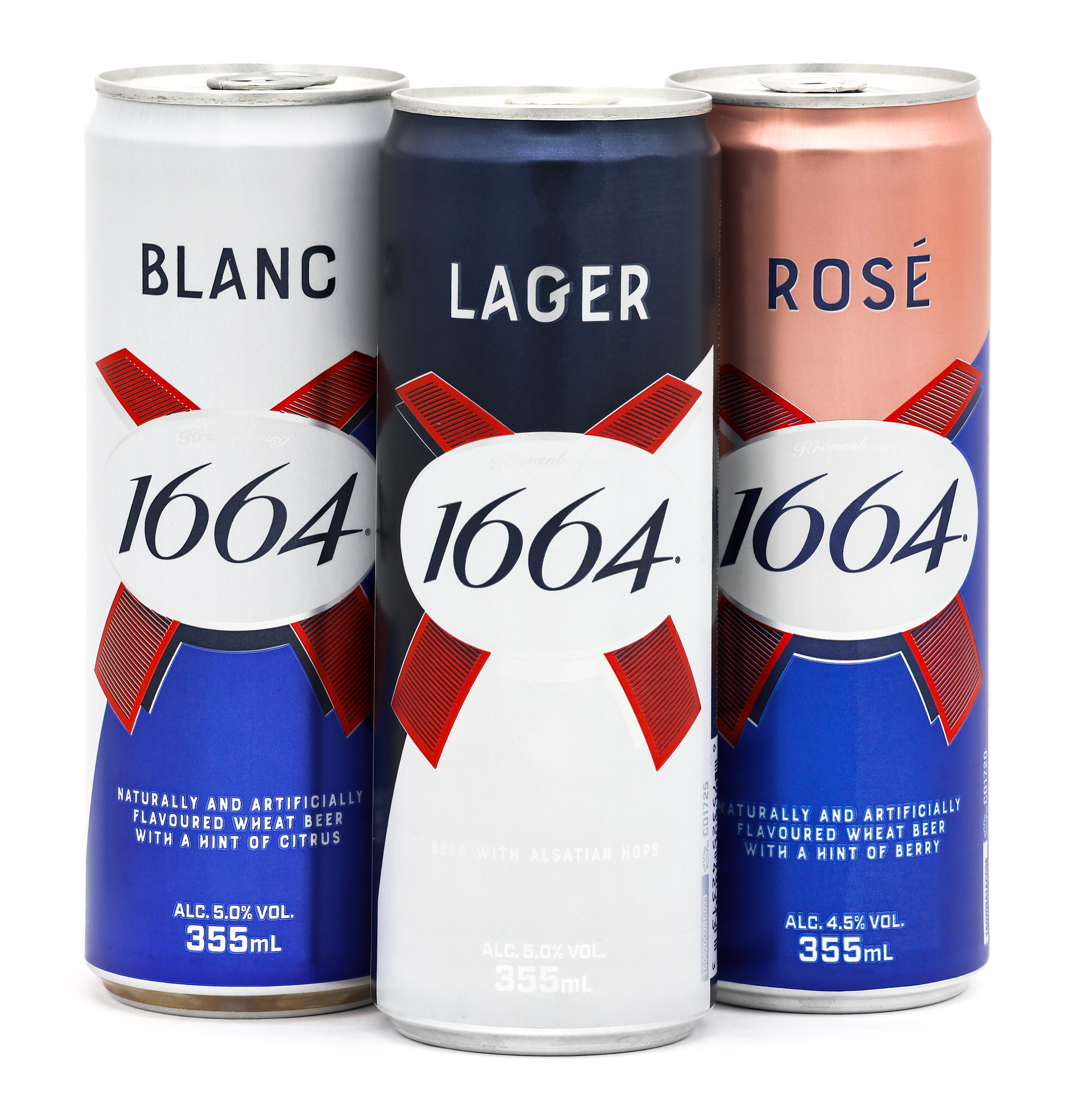
Assorted 1664 flavours

Kronenbourg 1664 is a golden pale lager with an alcohol by volume (ABV) of 5.5% in continental Europe, and options of 4.6% and 5.0% for the UK market. Kronenbourg 1664 is owned and produced in the UK by Heineken after being bought from Scottish & Newcastle. The Carlsberg Group owns and brews Kronenbourg in other markets. The French lager contains Strisselspalt hops, unique to Alsace, which are used in its brewing process and give the beer its bitter and fragrant citrus taste.

== History ==
In 1649, Geronimus Hatt obtained his master brewer certificate. Fifteen years later in 1664, he then opened up his first brewery, Brasserie du Canon, in Strasbourg. Just under 200 years later, the brewery relocated to the village of Cronenbourg, to the west of Strasbourg, because of a consistent flooding problem in its original location.

Strisselspalt hops were used in the creation of the lager in 1885. This ingredient native to the Alsace region of France has been used in the beer ever since.

In 1922, the Hatt Brewery changed its name to Tigre Brock. The name then changed again to Kronenbourg after the Second World War.

By 1952, the beer now known as Kronenbourg 1664 was launched by Brasseries Kronenbourg to celebrate founder Geronimus Hatt. It was sold in France and imported to Britain in time for the coronation of Queen Elizabeth II. After its launch in Britain, it was exported to 68 other countries.

In 2001, brewing company Scottish & Newcastle acquired Kronenbourg for £1.7 billion.

During 2004–2005, Kronenbourg 1664 won an award at the International Brewing Awards for the first time. It finished first in Class 2: 4.6–6.9% ABV category.

In 2008, Heineken purchased the licence to produce Kronenbourg 1664 in the UK from Scottish & Newcastle.

In 2023, Heineken's license to produce Kronenbourg 1664 in UK, was purchased by The Carlsberg Group, in doing so the ABV% was reduced from 5% to 4.6% with new marketing and labelling following suit in 2024 once the transition was complete.

== Production ==
Kronenbourg has breweries in the UK, France and Australia. Their UK brewery is based in Manchester and had a £50 million investment to improve its facilities and production.

The Carlsberg Group officially owns and brews Kronenbourg globally, including in the UK as of 2023 onwards.

Kronenbourg is available in the UK on draught and in several packed sizes including 275ml bottles, 660ml bottles, 568ml and 440ml cans.

== Advertising in the UK ==
In the 1980s, Kronenbourg 1664 launched its 'A Different Kind of Strength' advertising campaign. The campaign was featured on television across the UK. It told the story of a young man who struggled to win a game of pool, however after training and drinking Kronenbourg 1664 he showed 'A Different Kind of Strength' in order to win.

Kronenbourg 1664 began its 'Femme fatale' advertising campaign in 2000. The television ad showed men being distracted by what is at first assumed to be a young woman, however, after a few fatal accidents the camera zooms out and you find out they were all actually staring at a glass of Kronenbourg 1664. The ad created by advertising agency Rainey Kelly received over 60 complaints, all rejected by the Advertising Standards Authority (United Kingdom).

In 2004, the "Composer" advertising campaign was launched. The advert plays on the idea that once you open a bottle of Kronenbourg 1664 you have to stop what you're doing and enjoy it. Malcolm Venville directed the ad at Therapy Films.

The "Smaller Bubbles, Smoother Taste" Kronenbourg 1664 advert first aired in 2009 and was directed by Tony Kaye. The ad tells the story of a group of chefs trying to turn a large bubble into a number of smaller ones. They do this through the use of cooking equipment such as knives, mincers, graters and more. By the end, they have created the perfect sized bubbles to go in a glass of Kronenbourg 1664.

October 2010 saw Kronenbourg 1664 team up with two different British bands to create adverts for its "Slow the Pace" campaigns: the first was Motörhead who performed a slow acoustic version of their hit "Ace of Spades" in a busy pub. The second was Madness who played a toned down version of their song "Baggy Trousers". The slowed down version later featured on the Madness box set compilation A Guided Tour of Madness (2011) with the song title "Le Grand Pantalon". The two adverts created by ad agency BBH London encouraged the viewer to 'Slow the pace' and savour the taste.

In March 2013, Kronenbourg 1664's "A Taste Suprême" advertising campaign began. In the television advertisement, former professional footballer Eric Cantona played a starring role as brand ambassador. The ad plays on the idea that the hop farmers in France are treated like the celebrity footballers of the UK. The ad was created by advertising agency Ogilvy & Mather and featured the Queen song "We Are the Champions".

In 2014, complaints were made to the Advertising Standards Authority, which subsequently decided to ban the 2013 ad from being aired on the grounds that it was misleading. Months later, this ruling was overturned after Heineken submitted a request for the ruling to be reconsidered.

2016 saw the return of Cantona featuring in four videos for the digital campaign #lebigswim, the premise being that if 10,000 British people agreed that Kronenbourg 1664 is the best tasting beer in the world then Cantona would swim the English Channel.

Cantona was also to appear again on television screens in association with Kronenbourg 1664. In 2016, the ex-Manchester United player featured in a television advert called "The Alsace-tians". The concept of the TV ad plays off common depictions of St Bernard dogs with barrels around their necks, however in this ad they used Alsatians who deliver Kronenbourg 1664 to the deserving.
