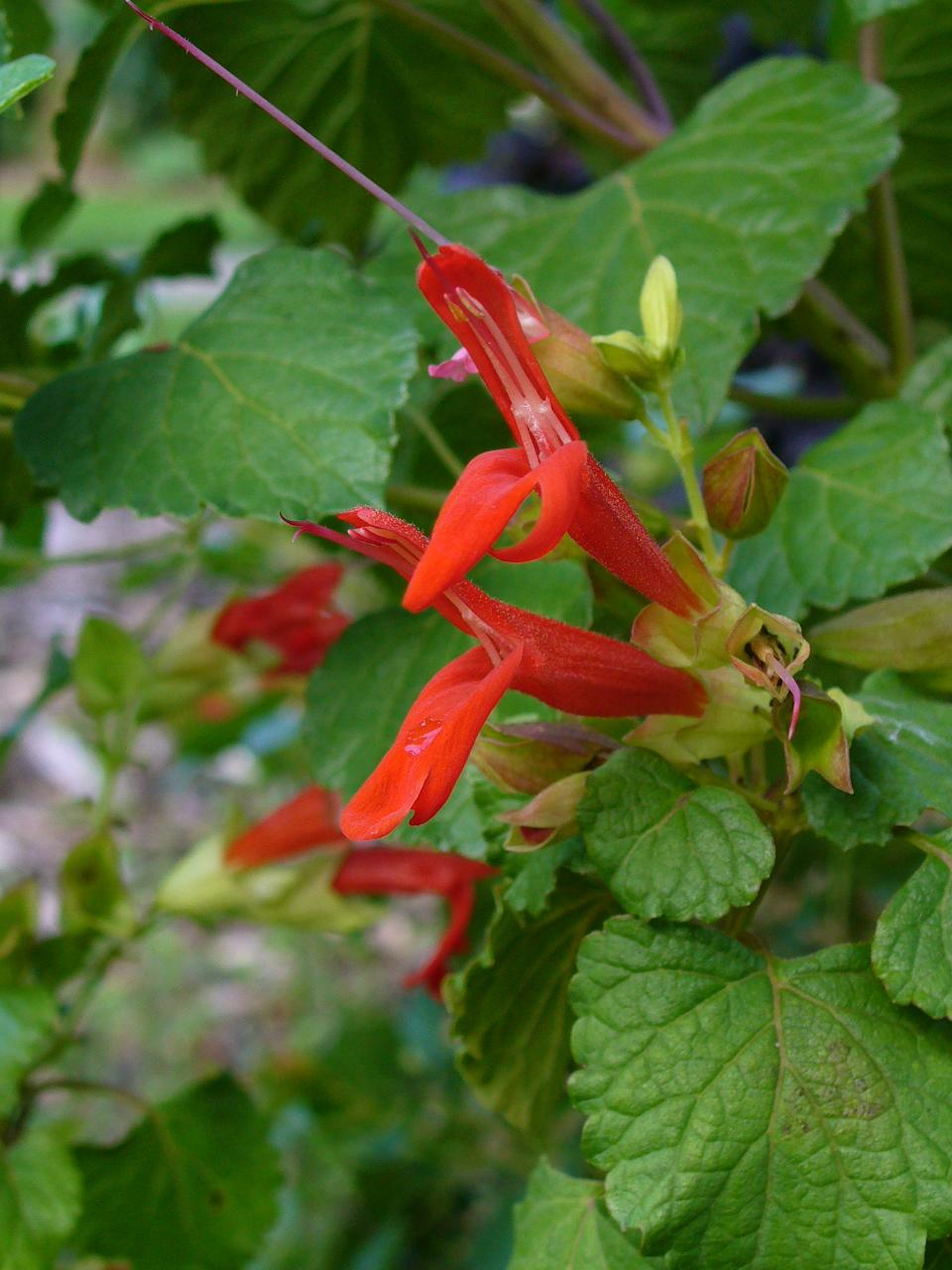

Scientific classification
- Kingdom: Plantae
- Clade: Tracheophytes
- Clade: Angiosperms
- Clade: Eudicots
- Clade: Asterids
- Order: Lamiales
- Family: Lamiaceae
- Genus: Salvia
- Species: S. regla

Binomial name
- Salvia regla Cav.

= Salvia regla =

Species of flowering plant

Salvia regla (mountain sage) is a deciduous perennial that is native to a small area of the Chisos Mountains in west Texas and a large area of Mexico, in the states of Coahuila, Durango, and Oaxaca. The specific epithet is probably from the town of Regla in the state of Hidalgo. It is also referred to as the "queen of the Chisos Mountains". It has been widely planted along the Texas flyway for migrating birds, and is an important food source for hummingbirds returning to the tropics in September and October.

Salvia regla is a deciduous shrub which reaches up to 6 feet tall and 4–5 feet wide. It grows on upright stems which give it a stately appearance. The mistletoe-green deltoid leaves are deeply veined and about 1 inch wide and long. The flower tube is 1 inch long, with a signal-red 1 inch calyx that is turned to the light, and is chartreuse on the underside. Though it was introduced into horticulture in 1839, it was very uncommon until the 1980s. Nurseries sell several cultivars, including 'Royal', 'Mount Emory', and 'Warnock's Choice'.
