= François Moulin =

French journalist and writer

François Moulin (8 August 1959 in Paris – 12 August 2012) was a French journalist and writer.

== Selected publications ==
- Art Nouveau, l'épopée lorraine, 1999.
- Jean Prouvé, le maître du métal, 2001 (only biography of the French designer, laureate of the national architecture book award).
- Le Mangeur lorrain, 200
- Le procès Simone Weber, 2004.
- Le Peuple du fer, 2006. Prix Victor Hugo.
- Ségolène Royal, un destin français, 2007.
- Lorraine, années noires, de la collaboration à l'épuration, 2009 (prix Léopold).

A specialist in the history of Lorraine, he is also the author of:

- Lettres de poilus
- Loritz, un lycée pionnier
- Les Enfants de la Grande Guerre
- Les Récits de la Grande Guerre
- L'Est Républicain, chronique d'un quotidien
- L'épopée du fer : 100 ans de métallurgie en Lorraine 2010
- Les grandes affaires criminelles des Vosges 2010.
- Histoire des Lorrains : volume 1 2011.
