= Birra Tirana =

Beer company in Albania

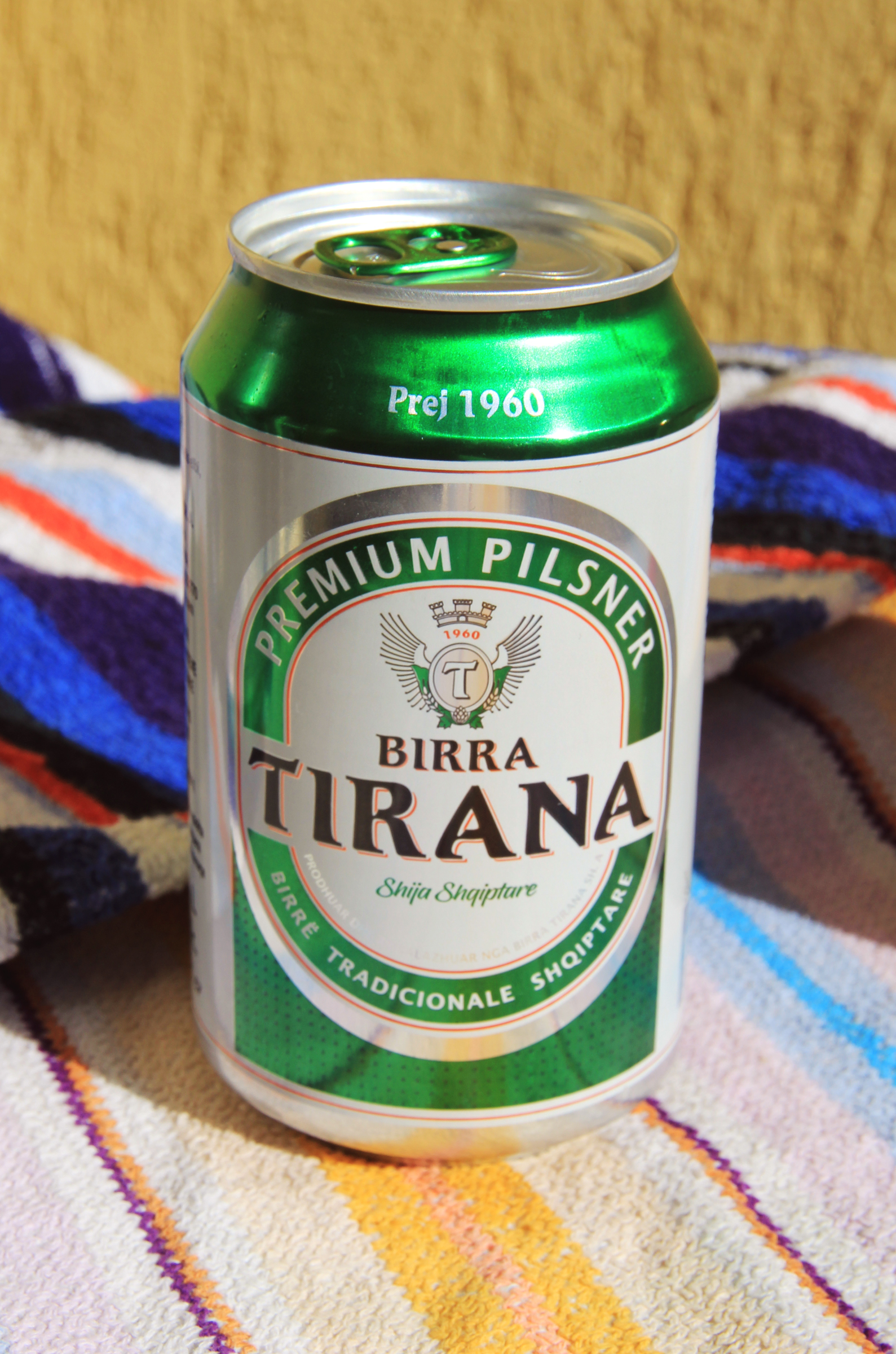
- Birra Tirana in a can
- Type: Beer
- Manufacturer: Malto Brewery
- Origin: PR Albania, Tirana
- Introduced: 1960; 66 years ago
- Alcohol by volume: 4.0%
- Colour: Golden
- Style: Pale lager, Pilsner

Birra Tirana is an Albanian beer brand brewed by Malto Brewery. It is among the country’s most established beer brands in terms of distribution, with exports to Kosovo, the United States and Europe. Its flagship product is a European-style pilsner available in bottles, cans and draught kegs.

== History ==
The origins of Birra Tirana date to 1960, when a brewery was established within the state-owned food processing plant Kombinati Ushqimor “Ali Kelmendi”. Commercial production began the following year, using Soviet-designed equipment and the brewery initially produced both pale pilsner and dark beer. A dedicated malt production facility was constructed at the site, using barley supplied mainly from the Korçë region and hops grown near Pogradec, while brewing water was sourced from the Selitë springs.

A major modernization programme was completed in 1983, increasing annual production capacity from around 70,000 to 150,000 hectolitres. The installation of German and Swedish brewing equipment improved production efficiency and enabled the brewery to expand its distribution throughout much of the country.

Following Albania’s transition to a market economy in the early 1990s, the brewery became an independent enterprise under the name Birra Malto. In 2001, it was privatized after a group of Albanian investors acquired a controlling stake.

The company obtained ISO 9001 quality certification in 2005 and, the following year, adopted the name Birra Tirana after its flagship brand.

== Products ==
Birra Tirana produces several varieties of beer, including Tirana Pilsner, Tirana Gold and Tirana Dark.

Its products are sold in 330 ml and 500 ml glass bottles and aluminium cans, as well as 30- and 50-litre kegs intended for the hospitality sector.
