= Birra Kaon =

Albanian beer company

- Official logo
- Location: Tirana, Albania
- Opened: 1995
- Key people: Artan Stroka
- Owner: T.E.A Company
- Website: www.kaonbeer.com

Active beers
Lager, European type pilsner, Weiss
Name	Type

Birra Kaon (transl. Kaon Beer) is a beer company, founded in Tirana, Albania in 1995. A proprietary of T.E.A Company, it is the fourth-largest beer producer in the country.

Like other Albanian beer producers, the company struggles with competition from companies abroad.

== Breweries ==
Birra Kaon recycles water during its pasteurization process, which reduces both costs and unneeded water use. They also sell their spent grains to farmers. Birra Kaon are able to reuse both kegs and glass bottles.
