= Fatmir Hysenbelliu =

Albanian footballer and businessman

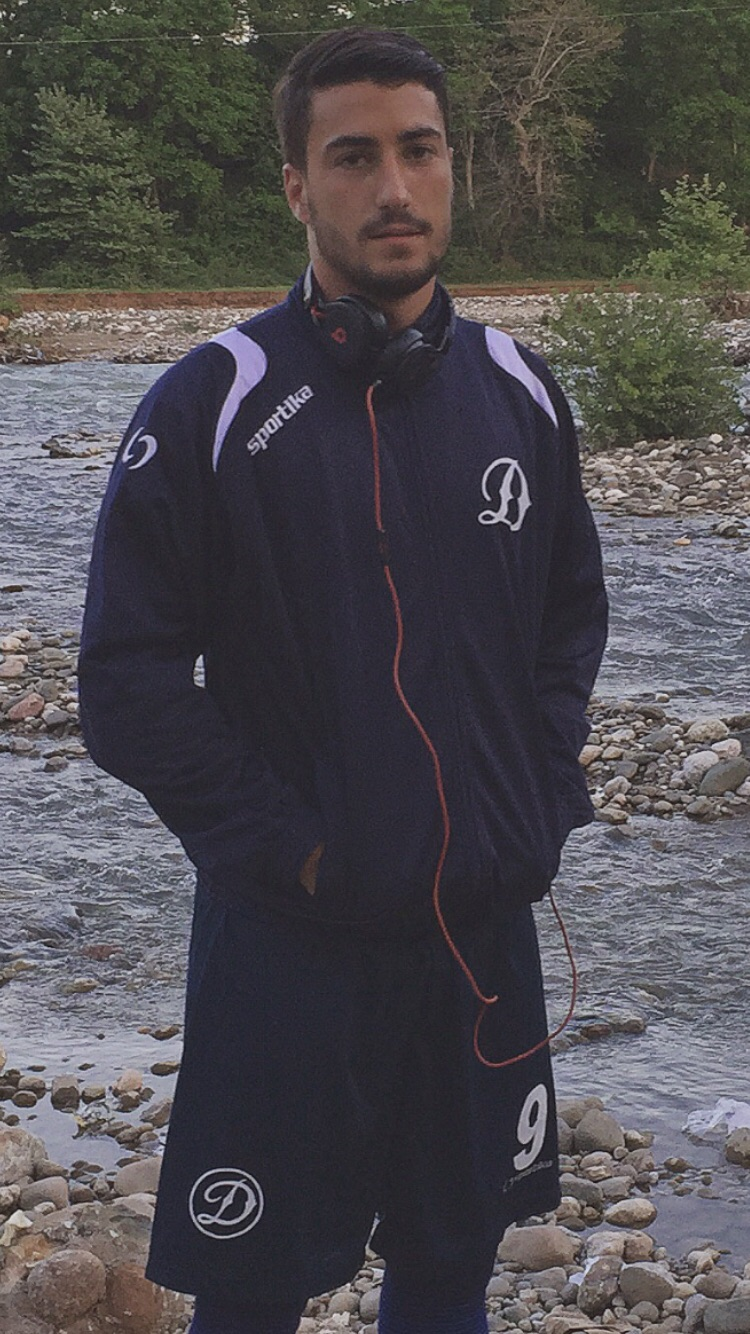

Personal information
- Full name: Fatmir Irfan Hysenbelliu
- Date of birth: 4 April 1992 (age 34)
- Place of birth: Tirana, Albania
- Height: 1.79 m (5 ft 10 1/2 in)
- Position: Attacking midfielder

Youth career
- 2001–2003: Partizani Tirana
- 2003–2007: Olimpik Tirana
- 2007–2008: Tottenham
- 2008–2009: Fulham
- 2009–2011: Bari
- 2011: Genoa
- 2011: → FC Lugano (loan)

Senior career*
Years	Team	Apps	(Gls)
2011–2013	Bari	0	(0)
2013	→ Tirana (loan)	10	(0)
2013–2014	Tirana	3	(0)
2014	Partizani	3	(0)
2014	Teuta	0	(0)
2015	Dinamo Tirana	6	(0)

International career
2011	Albania U21		
- * Club domestic league appearances and goals

Fatmir Hysenbelliu (born 4 April 1992, in Tirana) is an Albanian businessman and retired footballer who played as an attacking midfielder.

== Career ==
Fatmir's father Irfan Hysenbelli, is a businessman.

=== Early career ===
Hysenbelli began playing football as a young child in 2001 with Partizani Tirana, before moving to another local team KF Olimpik Tirana in 2003 where he would remain until 2007 when he moved to England. During his time in England he briefly played for both Tottenham and Fulham. He then moved to Italy to sign for AS Bari, where he would go on to captain the youth team. In January 2011 he signed with Genoa but was immediately loaned out to Swiss side FC Lugano, playing for their U21 team but not featuring in any games during his 6-month loan period. He then rejoined AS Bari in the summer and began to train with the first team.

=== Partizani ===
Hysenbelliu was training with New York Red Bulls in the United States in order to maintain his fitness following his departure from KF Tirana. Once he returned to Albania he signed a three-year contract with Partizani Tirana on 16 January 2014 and was presented to the media, before joining the club on their winter training camp in Antalya, Turkey.

=== Teuta ===
Following his departure from Partizani Tirana Hysenbelliu went on trial to the English League One club Doncaster Rovers, with whom he reportedly agreed terms with the club but problems arose regarding documentation, which paved the way for a move back to Albania with Teuta Durrës. He signed for the club in the closing stages of deadline day on 1 September 2014, and scored in his first game for the club in an internal friendly against the club's under-19 side during the international break. He made his official debut for the club in an Albanian Cup fixture against Besëlidhja Lezhë on 1 October 2014, where he played the full 90 minutes in the 2–0 win. His second and last appearance for the club came in the return leg of the same Albanian Cup fixture against Besëlidhja Lezhë, where he started the game but was substituted off for Vangjel Mile in the 60th minute in the 3–2 win. He left Teuta Durrës on 22 November 2014 without having made a league appearance for the club.

=== Dinamo ===
He joined Dinamo Tirana in the Albanian First Division in January 2015 where he was limited to only 6 league appearances due to injury during his time with the 18-time champions. He left the club at the end of the 2014–15 campaign.

== Career statistics ==
=== Club ===
As of 1 September 2015

Club	Season	League			Cup		Europe		Other		Total	
Club	Season	Division	Apps	Goals	Apps	Goals	Apps	Goals	Apps	Goals	Apps	Goals
AS Bari	2011–12	Serie B	0	0	0	0	—		—		0	0
AS Bari	2012–13	Serie B	0	0	0	0	—		—		0	0
AS Bari	Total		0	0	0	0	—		—		0	0
KF Tirana	2012–13	Albanian Superliga	10	0	0	0	—		—		10	0
KF Tirana	2013–14	Albanian Superliga	3	0	1	0	—		—		4	0
KF Tirana	Total		13	0	1	0	—		—		14	0
Partizani Tirana	2013–14	Albanian Superliga	3	0	0	0	—		—		3	0
Partizani Tirana	Total		3	0	0	0	—		—		3	0
Teuta Durrës	2014–15	Albanian Superliga	0	0	2	0	—		—		2	0
Teuta Durrës	Total		0	0	2	0	—		—		2	0
Dinamo Tirana	2014–15	Albanian First Division	6	0	0	0	—		—		6	0
Dinamo Tirana	Total		6	0	0	0	—		—		6	0
Career total			22	0	3	0	—		—		25	0
