= Birra Elbar =

Beer company in Albania

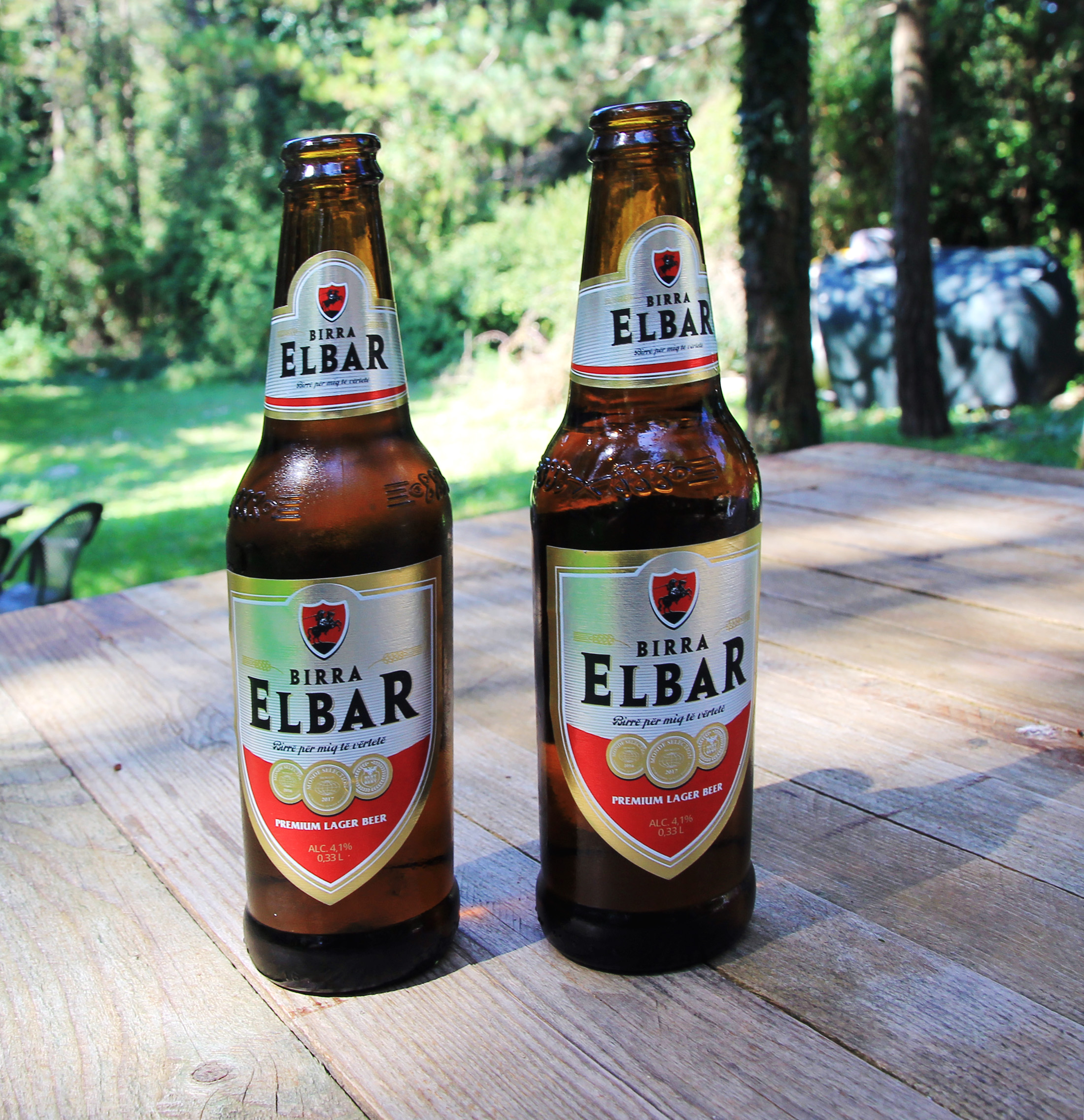
- Birra Elbar in bottles
- Type: Beer
- Manufacturer: Alfa Sh.A.
- Origin: Albania, Glinë
- Introduced: 2015; 11 years ago
- Alcohol by volume: 4.1%
- Colour: Golden
- Style: Pale lager

Birra Elbar is an Albanian beer brand produced by ALFA Sh.A., a beverage company based in Glinë, Gjirokastër County. Introduced in July 2015, the beer is brewed as a European-style pale lager and has grown to become one of Albania's leading domestic beer brands.

Its flagship lager has an alcohol content of 4.1% by volume and is available in bottles, cans and draught kegs.

== History ==
Birra Elbar was launched in 2015 as ALFA Sh.A.'s entry into the Albanian beer market. The brand was developed following market research and consumer testing, with its current name selected from several proposals.

The name Elbar is derived from the Albanian words elb (barley) and ar (gold), meaning "golden barley".

Its logo consists of a red-and-black heraldic shield depicting a mounted warrior carrying a spear. The brand name is flanked by stylized golden barley ears, while the slogan "Beer for true friends" appears beneath.

The brand has recently introduced a new wheat beer variety, known as Weißbier.

== Awards ==
Birra Elbar has received several international distinctions. It won a Silver Medal at the Monde Selection competition in 2016, a Bronze Medal at the World Beer Awards in 2018 and in 2024 was named Country Winner for Albania in the International Lager category at the World Beer Awards, where it also received a Gold Medal.
