= Kronenbourg Brewery =

Brewery in Strasbourg, France

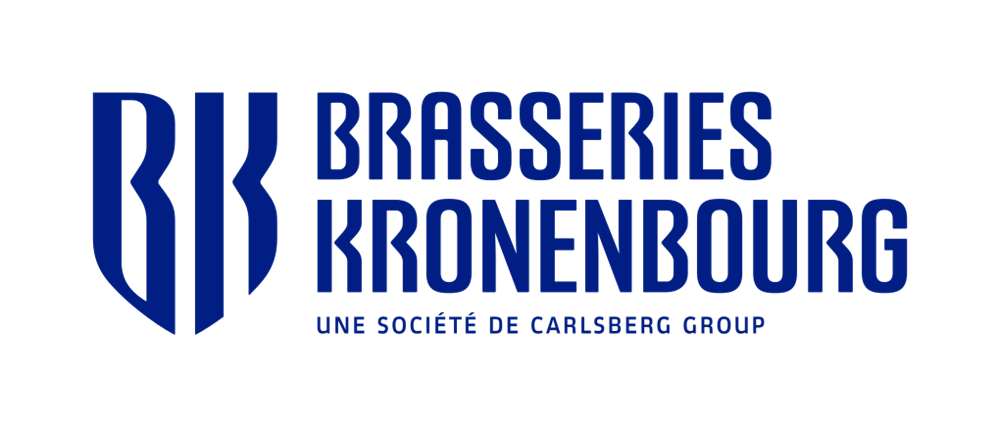
- Industry: Brewing
- Founded: 1664; 362 years ago
- Founder: Geronimus Hatt
- Headquarters: Strasbourg, France
- Products: Beer
- Owner: Carlsberg
- Website: kronenbourg.com

Kronenbourg Brewery (French: Brasseries Kronenbourg, German: Kronenbourg Brauerei, pronounced [kʁɔnɑ̃buʁ]) is a brewery founded in 1664 by Geronimus Hatt in the Free Imperial City of Straßburg, Holy Roman Empire (today Strasbourg, France). The name comes from the area where the brewery relocated in 1850. The company is owned by the Danish multinational Carlsberg. The premium brand (and the one sold in the greatest volumes outside France) is Kronenbourg 1664, a 5.5% abv pale lager.

== History ==
Geronimus Hatt, who obtained his Master Brewer's certificate in 1649, started up the Canon Brewery in the Place du Corbeau in Strasbourg. His son Claude (born November 1665), succeeded his father in the trade in 1683. However, the frequent flooding of the River Ill compelled in 1850 a move to the higher terrain of Cronenbourg, an area of Strasbourg.

In 1922, the Hatt Brewery changed its name to Tigre Bock, the most well-known brand of the Tiger Brewery it had acquired to become the leading brewer in Alsace. Following the Second World War, Kronenbourg became the name of the company, and began international expansion. In 1970, it was acquired by industrial group BSN (now Groupe Danone), along with the Société Européenne de Brasseries (Kanterbräu). In 1986, Kronenbourg merged with Kanterbräu.

In 1953, Kronenbourg was sold in the UK for the first time in honour of the coronation of Queen Elizabeth II.

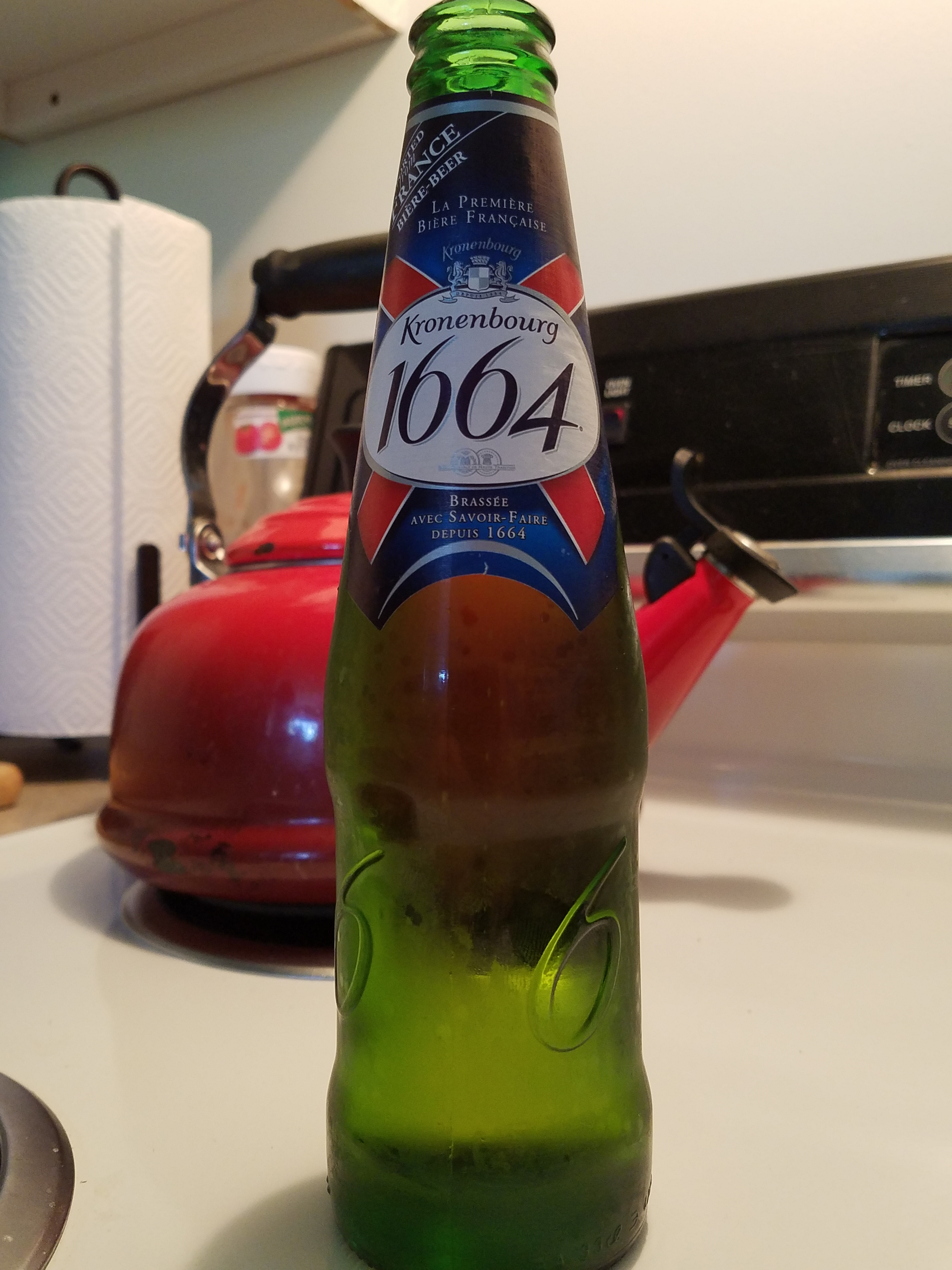
Kronenbourg Euro Pale Lager

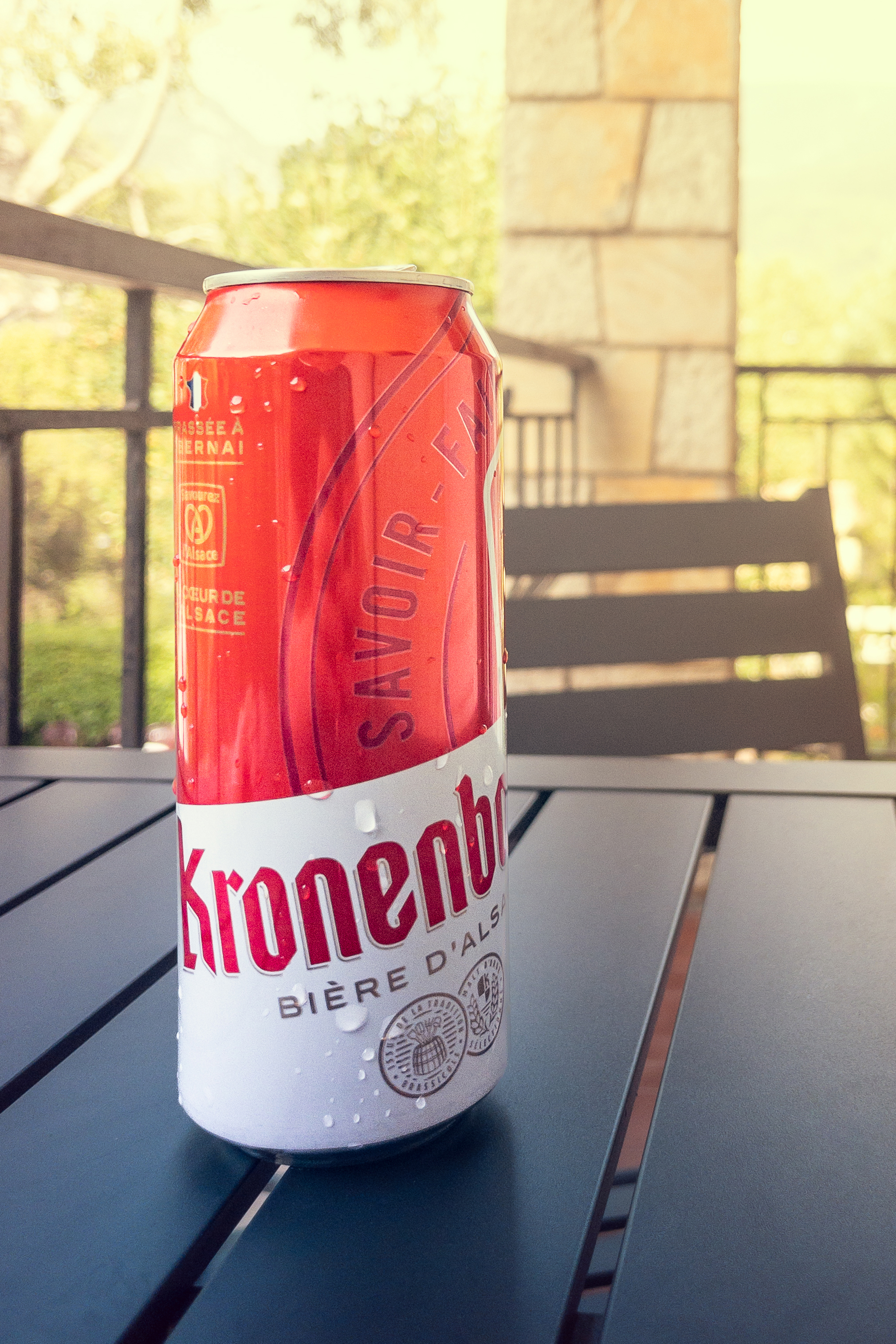
Kronenbourg canned beer

In 1970, the brewer was acquired by Boussois-Souchon-Neuvesel (BSN), a glass-making conglomerate, which added Evian to its list of mergers in the same year. In 1973 BSN itself would merge and form BSN-Gervais Danone.

In 2000, Kronenbourg was acquired from Danone by British company Scottish & Newcastle for £1.7 billion.

In April 2008, Scottish & Newcastle's operations were sold to Heineken and Carlsberg, the latter acquiring Kronenbourg.

Its main breweries are in Obernai and in Champigneulles, although the Champigneulles site is now up for sale.

On 2 April 2015, Brasseries Kronenbourg launched a new corporate identity which it will use in corporate communications. It was designed by Carré Noir, which has been the brewery's design agency for several years. According to a press release, the new logo reaffirms Kronenbourg's identity as a French brewer with 350 years of history.

== Beers ==
=== Kanterbräu ===
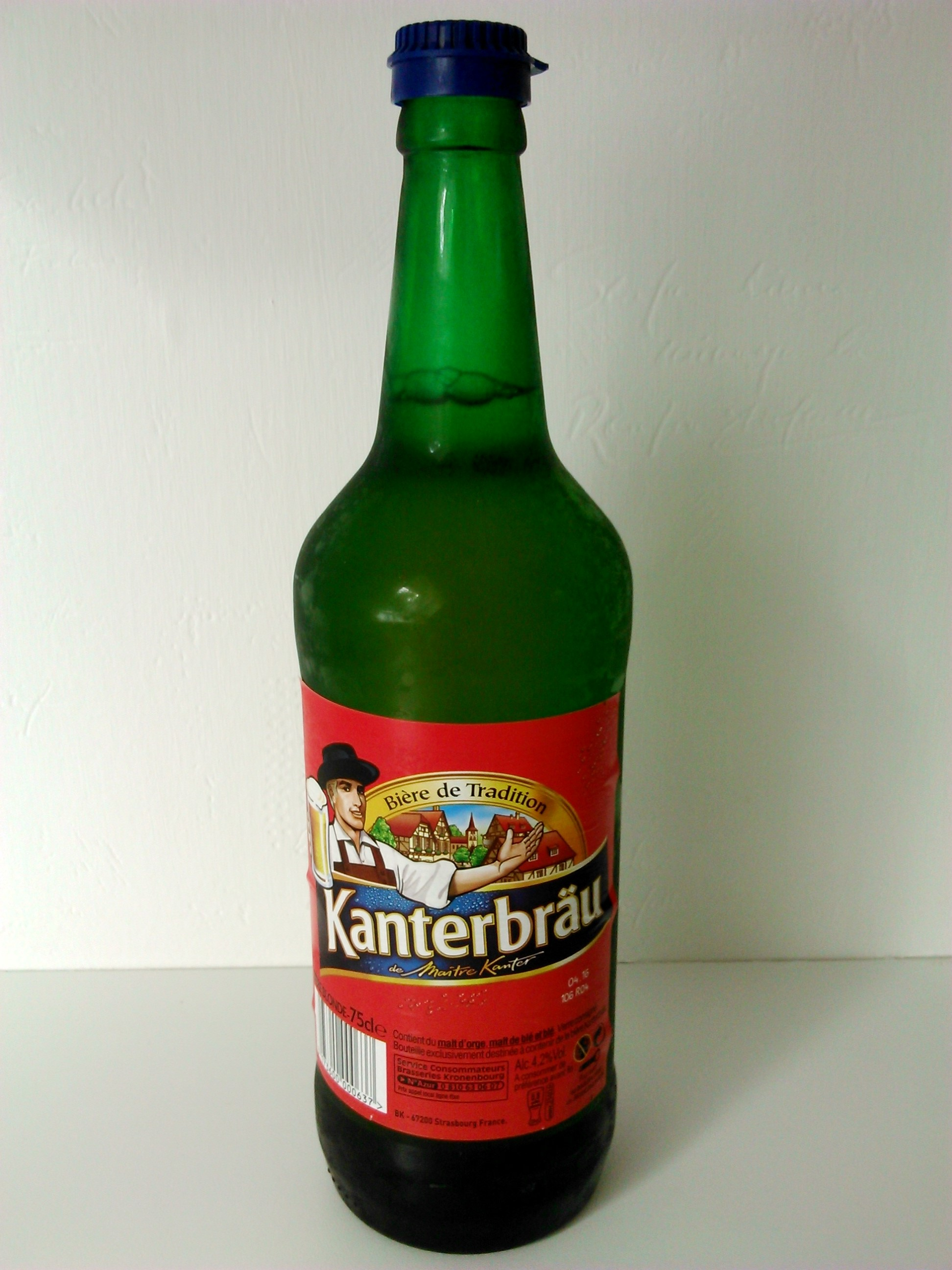
Kanterbräu

Kanterbräu is a 4.2% pale lager.

=== 1664 ===
Kronenbourg 1664 is a 5.5% (4.6% in the UK) pale lager first brewed in 1952. A small amount of the Strisselspalt hop, a French aroma hop from Alsace, is used. The main Kronenbourg 1664 brewery (where Kronenbourg also produces almost 300 other beer brands) is in Obernai (France), but the brand is also brewed in the UK by Heineken at its Manchester brewery, in Australia by Coopers, as well as in Ukraine by Carlsberg.

=== Other beers ===
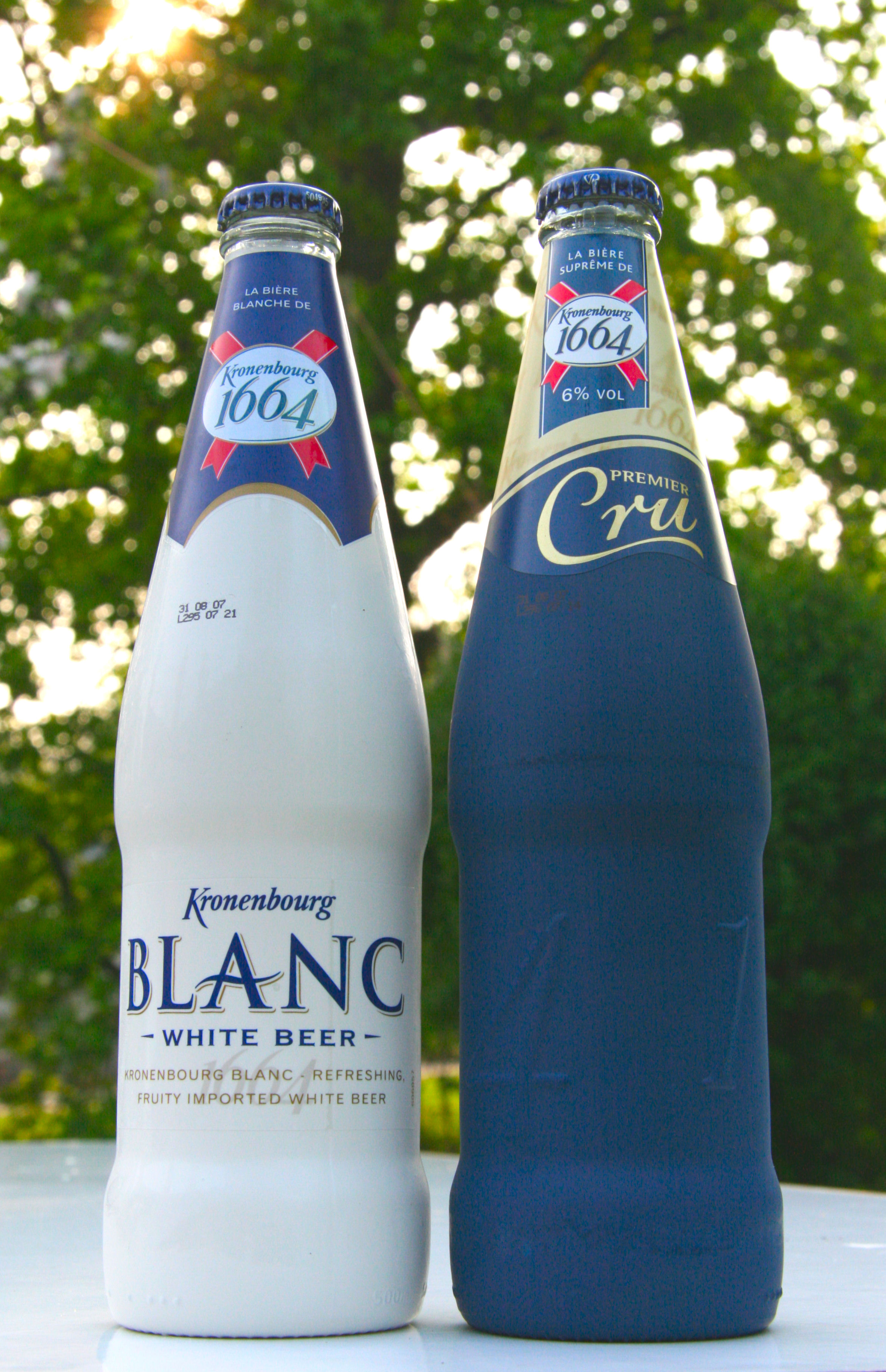
Kronenbourg Blanc

Other brands include: 1664 Brune; Single Malt (French name Malt d'Exception), 6.1% abv; Kronenbourg Blanc, a fruity wheat beer with citrus notes; Kronenbourg Premier Cru 6.0% abv; Kronenbourg Cold Premier 5.0%, a super chilled variant on 1664, draught only, UK; and Kronenbourg Red 4.2% abv.

== See also ==
- Beer in France
