= Irfan Hysenbelliu =

Albanian businessman

- Born: Irfan Hasan Hysenbelliu; 8 April 1959 (age 66); Çorovodë, PR Albania
- Occupation(s): • Chairman of Hysenbelliu Group • President of Panorama Group • President of Birra Korça • Co-owner of Luarasi University • President of News 24
- Children: Fabiola Hysenbelli; Fatmir Hysenbelliu
- Parent(s): Hasan Hysenbelliu; Fiqirete Vila

Irfan Hasan Hysenbelliu (born 1959) is an Albanian businessman and CEO of IHB Group, which owns Birra Korça, Erjoni LTD and Panorama Group. He is also a 50% shareholder in Luarasi University and Focus Group, which owns the News 24 television channel. He also has shares at 15 hospitals across Italy and one in Paris, France along with Italian company Villa Maria.
