= Birra Stela =

Beer company in Albania

- Type: Beer
- Manufacturer: Iliria Brewery
- Origin: Albania, Tirana
- Introduced: 1994; 32 years ago
- Alcohol by volume: 4.6%
- Colour: Golden
- Style: Pale lager
- Website: www.stefani-co.al

Birra Stela is an Albanian beer brand produced by Iliria Brewery, formerly "Stefani & Co.", headquartered in Tirana.

First introduced in 1994, it is one of Albania’s best-known domestic beer brands. The brewery has an annual production capacity of up to 250,000 hectolitres, accounting for an estimated 4% of the domestic beer market.

== History ==
Birra Stela was introduced in 1994 following the establishment of the "Stela & Dorina" brewery, by a group of Albanian entrepreneurs led by Stefan Pinguli. Initial production was approximately 500 litres per day, with the aim of introducing modern brewing technology and producing beer in accordance with European brewing standards.

In 2000, the company was reorganized as "Stefani & Co." and relocated its production facilities along the Tirana–Durrës highway. During the following years, the brewery expanded its production capacity through investments in new equipment and implemented internationally recognized food safety management systems, including HACCP and ISO 22000 certification.

The brewery gradually diversified its product portfolio beyond the flagship Stela lager. In 2013, it introduced "Birra Iliria", followed by "Cek Pilsner" as well as additional craft beers and dark beer varieties. By 2023, the company launched Stela 0.0%, a non-alcoholic version of its flagship beer.

In 2025, Stefani & Co. was acquired by "Eurolab Internacional Grup", which initiated a modernization programme for the brewery. In May 2026, the company was renamed Iliria Brewery, becoming the producer and owner of the Stela and Iliria beer brands.
