= Birra Korça =

Albanian brewing company

Coordinates: 40.6112°N 20.7907°E

Birra Korça Brewery
- Official logo
- Location: Korçë, Albania
- Opened: 1928
- Key people: Lüder Rutenberg
- Owner: Irfan Hysenbelliu
- Parent: IHB Group
- Website: birrakorca.com.al

Active beers
Blonde Ale, European type pilsner, Dark Ale
Name	Type

Birra Korça is a brewing company, founded in Korçë, Albania, in 1928. The company is a subsidiary of IHB group since 2004. It is the third largest beer producer in Albania.

== History ==
Birra Korça, established in 1928 in the town of Korçë, Albania, is the country's first brewery. Founded by Italian investor Umberto Umberti and local investor Selim Mboria, the initial capital for the company was 950,000 francs, with an initial production capacity of 20,000 hectoliters per year. The brewery's early offerings included Blonde Ale Beer, Dark ale, bottled water named "Kristal," and ice.

Following World War II and the establishment of the communist regime in Albania on January 11, 1946, the brewery became state property. Reconstruction and renovations occurred in 1955, 1957, and 1965, gradually increasing production. In April 1994, amidst political and economic changes, including an economic downturn, the brewery was auctioned and acquired by a group of businessmen.

In 2004, businessman Irfan Hysenbelliu, president of "Birra Korça LLC," purchased the brewery and invested €15 million in its renovation. Utilising the latest Czech and Italian technology, the brewery now produces 120,000 hectolitres of beer annually, ten times the output of the original facility. The traditional design has been preserved while incorporating new elements of the same style. It sources its water from the natural springs of Morava Mountain. Birra Korça hosts an annual beer festival in August, the largest in the region.

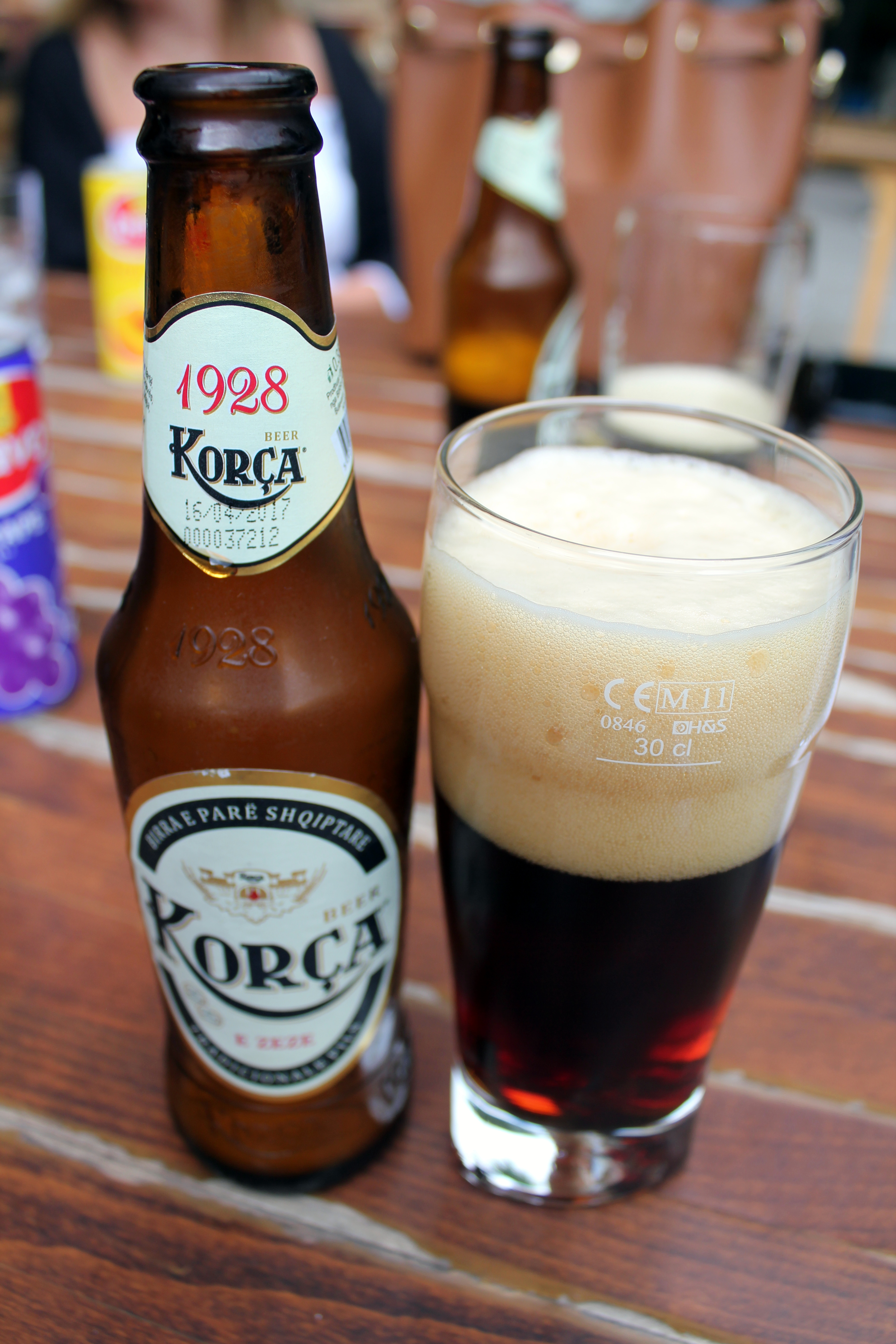
A 33cl bottle of the Dark Ale, a Euro dark lager (dunkel) with 5-5.2% ABV

== Brands ==
Korça brand beers offer a range of options, such as the Blonde Ale, a European-style pilsner with 4.8-5% alcohol by volume, and the Dark Ale, a Euro dark lager (dunkel) with 5-5.2% ABV. Birra Korça is available in 0.5-litre and 0.33-litre bottles, as well as 30-litre and 50-litre kegs.

== Awards ==
"Birra Korça" has been recognised with several quality awards. Its first award was obtained in Thessaloniki, Greece, in 1928. In 2007, the company received the International Quality Crown Award in the Golden category from Business Initiative Directions (BID), a vanity award. Birra Korça also holds the ISO 22000 certificate, an international standard applicable to organisations operating within the food chain. This certification encompasses both traditional quality assurance measures and preventive food-safety protocols.
