= Popovice =

Popovice may refer to places in the Czech Republic:

- Popovice (Benešov District), a municipality and village in the Central Bohemian Region
- Popovice (Brno-Country District), a municipality and village in the South Moravian Region
- Popovice (Uherské Hradiště District), a municipality and village in the Zlín Region
- Popovice, a village and part of Brandýs nad Labem-Stará Boleslav in the Central Bohemian Region
- Popovice, a village and part of Dolní Bukovsko in the South Bohemian Region
- Popovice, a village and part of Jaroměřice nad Rokytnou in the Vysočina Region
- Popovice, a village and part of Jičín in the Hradec Králové Region
- Popovice, a village and part of Králův Dvůr in the Central Bohemian Region
- Popovice, a village and part of Rataje (Kroměříž District) in the Zlín Region
- Popovice, a village and part of Šebířov in the South Bohemian Region
- Popovice, a village and part of Teplá in the Karlovy Vary Region
- Popovice, a village and part of Třesovice in the Hradec Králové Region
- Popovice, a village and part of Všeruby (Plzeň-North District) in the Plzeň Region
- Děčín XXIII-Popovice, a part of Děčín in the Ústí nad Labem Region
- Přerov X-Popovice, a part of Přerov in the Olomouc Region
- Velké Popovice, a municipality and village in the Central Bohemian Region
- Vysoké Popovice, a municipality and village in the South Moravian Region

== See also ==
- Velkopopovický Kozel
