= Rataje (Kroměříž District) =

- Municipality
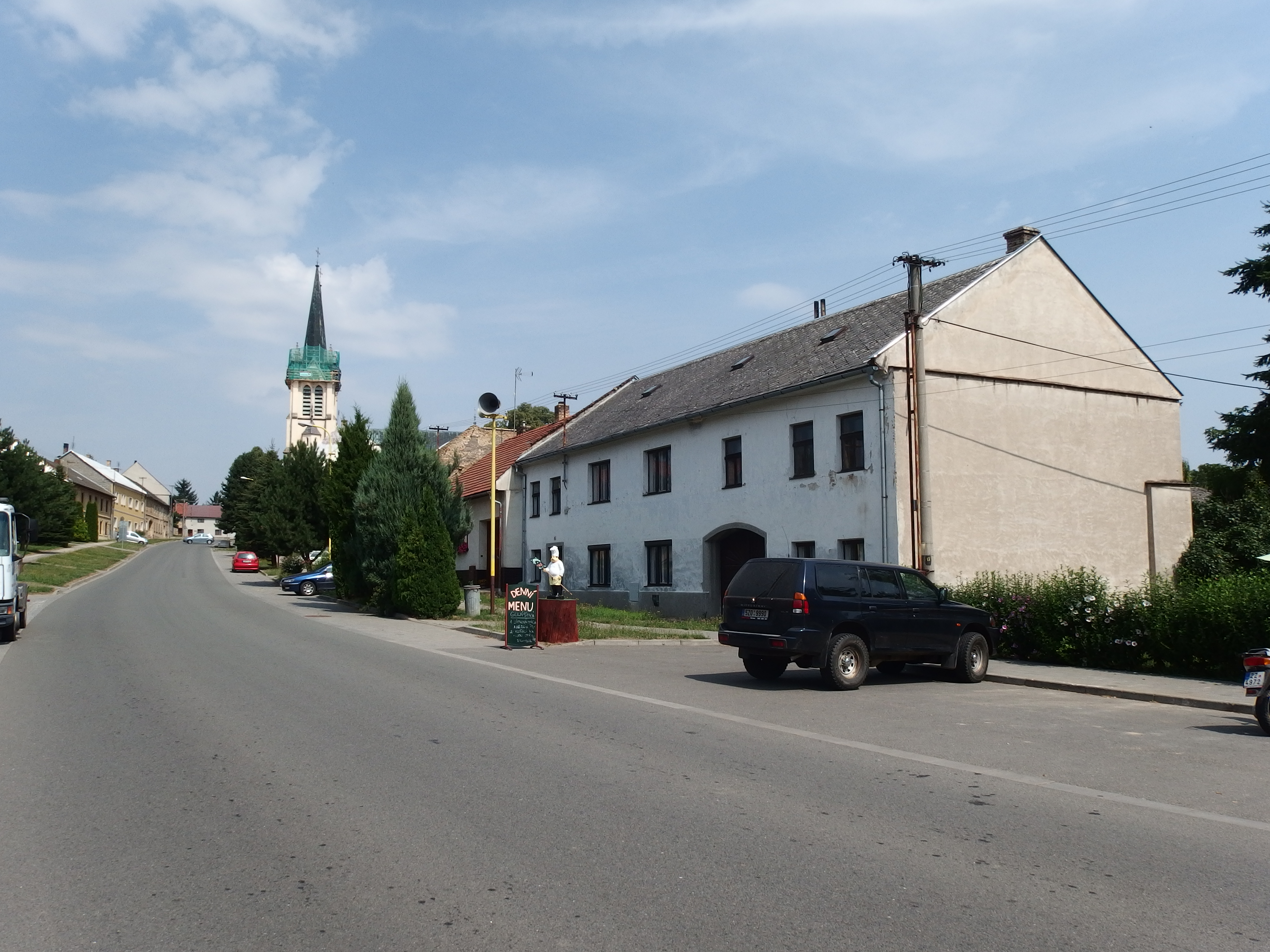
- Main street in Rataje

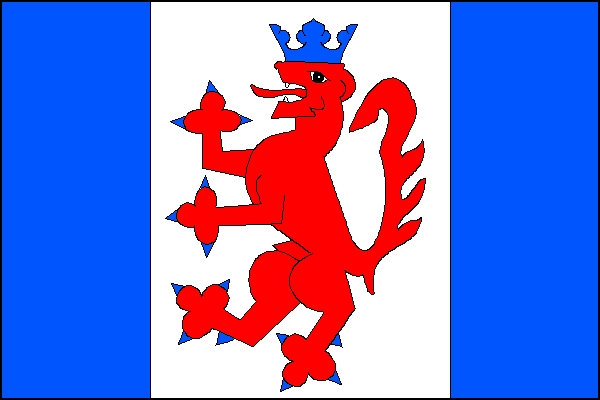
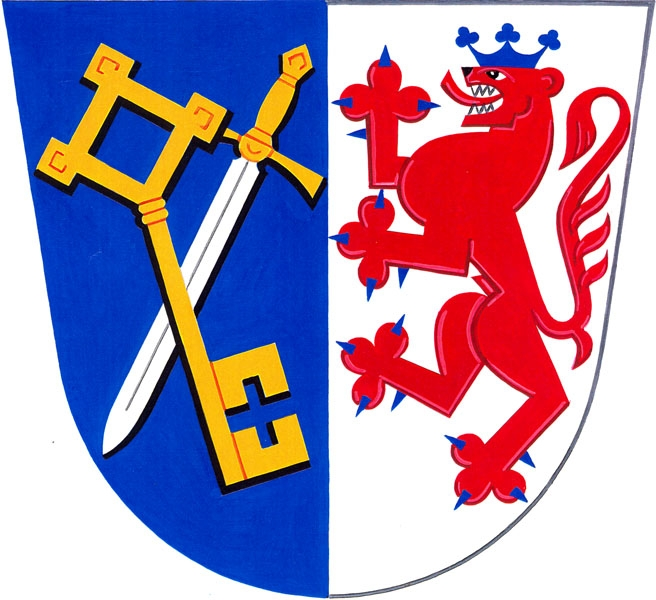
- Flag Coat of arms

- Location in the Czech Republic
- Coordinates: 49°16′17″N 17°20′8″E
- Country: Czech Republic
- Region: Zlín
- District: Kroměříž
- First mentioned: 1283

Area
  - Total: 12.11 km^{2} (4.68 sq mi)
- Elevation: 253 m (830 ft)

Population (2026-01-01)
  - Total: 1,136
  - Density: 93.81/km^{2} (243.0/sq mi)
- Time zone: UTC+1 (CET)
  - Summer (DST): UTC+2 (CEST)
- Postal code: 768 12
- Website: www.rataje.cz

Rataje is a municipality and village in Kroměříž District in the Zlín Region of the Czech Republic. It has about 1,100 inhabitants.

Rataje lies approximately 6 kilometres (4 mi) south-west of Kroměříž, 25 km (16 mi) west of Zlín, and 229 km (142 mi) south-east of Prague.

== Administrative division ==
Rataje consists of three municipal parts (in brackets population according to the 2021 census):

- Rataje (446)
- Popovice (483)
- Sobělice (214)

== Demographics ==
Historical population
Year	Pop.	±%
1869	1,042	—
1880	1,129	+8.3%
1890	1,132	+0.3%
1900	1,159	+2.4%
1910	1,265	+9.1%
1921	1,246	−1.5%
1930	1,214	−2.6%
1950	1,067	−12.1%
1961	1,112	+4.2%
1970	992	−10.8%
1980	948	−4.4%
1991	931	−1.8%
2001	974	+4.6%
2011	1,055	+8.3%
2021	1,143	+8.3%
Source: Censuses
