= Velké Popovice =

- Municipality
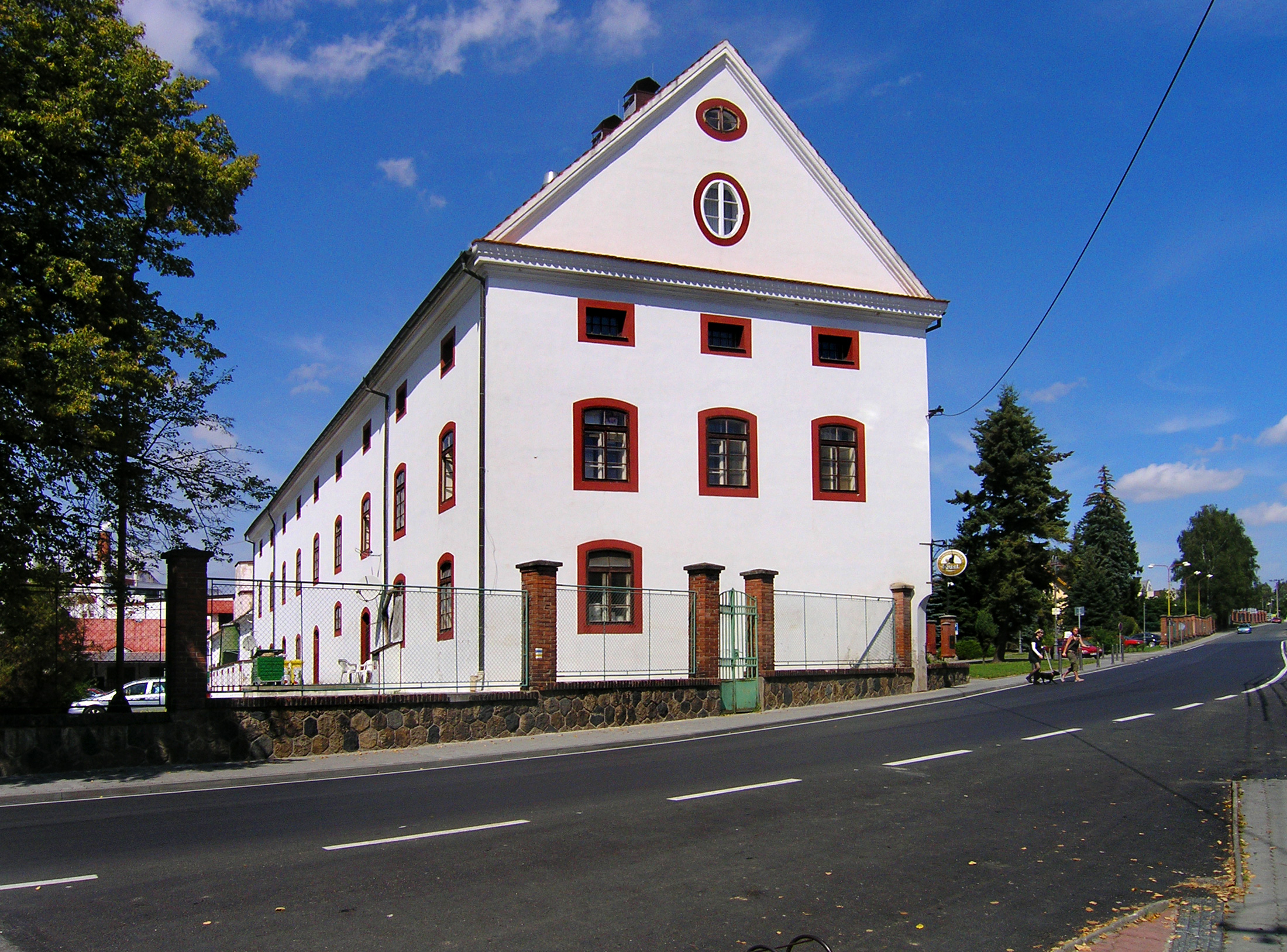
- Historic brewery building

- Flag Coat of arms

- Location in the Czech Republic
- Coordinates: 49°55′21″N 14°38′22″E
- Country: Czech Republic
- Region: Central Bohemian
- District: Prague-East
- First mentioned: 1332

Area
  - Total: 15.62 km^{2} (6.03 sq mi)
- Elevation: 413 m (1,355 ft)

Population (2026-01-01)
  - Total: 3,338
  - Density: 213.7/km^{2} (553.5/sq mi)
- Time zone: UTC+1 (CET)
  - Summer (DST): UTC+2 (CEST)
- Postal code: 251 69
- Website: www.velkepopovice.cz

Velké Popovice (Czech pronunciation: [ˈvɛlkɛː ˈpopovɪtsɛ]; German: Groß Popowitz) is a municipality and village in Prague-East District in the Central Bohemian Region of the Czech Republic. It has about 3,300 inhabitants.

== Administrative division ==
Velké Popovice consists of ten municipal parts (in brackets population according to the 2021 census):

- Velké Popovice (2,086)
- Brtnice (574)
- Dub (0)
- Dubiny (73)
- Klenové (21)
- Krámský (28)
- Křivá Ves (20)
- Lojovice (202)
- Mokřany (35)
- Řepčice (157)

== Etymology ==
The initial name of the village was just Popovice. The name was derived either from the personal name Pop or from the Old Czech word pop (i.e. 'priest'), meaning "the village of Pop's/priest's people". Velké Popovice means 'great Popovice'.

== Geography ==
Velké Popovice is located about 15 kilometres (9 mi) southeast of Prague. It lies in the Benešov Uplands. The highest point is at 485 m (1,591 ft) above sea level. The stream Mokřanský potok flows through the municipality and together with several nameless tributaries supplies several fishponds in the territory.

== History ==
The first written mention of Velké Popovice is from 1332.

== Demographics ==
Historical population

Year	Pop.	±%
1869	1,504	—
1880	1,439	−4.3%
1890	1,487	+3.3%
1900	1,504	+1.1%
1910	1,885	+25.3%

Year	Pop.	±%
1921	1,902	+0.9%
1930	2,171	+14.1%
1950	2,003	−7.7%
1961	1,918	−4.2%
1970	1,778	−7.3%

Year	Pop.	±%
1980	1,731	−2.6%
1991	1,720	−0.6%
2001	1,788	+4.0%
2011	2,760	+54.4%
2021	3,196	+15.8%

Source: Censuses

== Economy ==
Velké Popovice is known mostly for the production of the Velkopopovický Kozel beer. The beer brewing in Velké Popovice was first documented in the 16th century and the current brewery was founded in 1874.

== Transport ==
There are no major roads passing through the municipality. The railway that runs north of Velké Popovice is unused.

== Sights ==
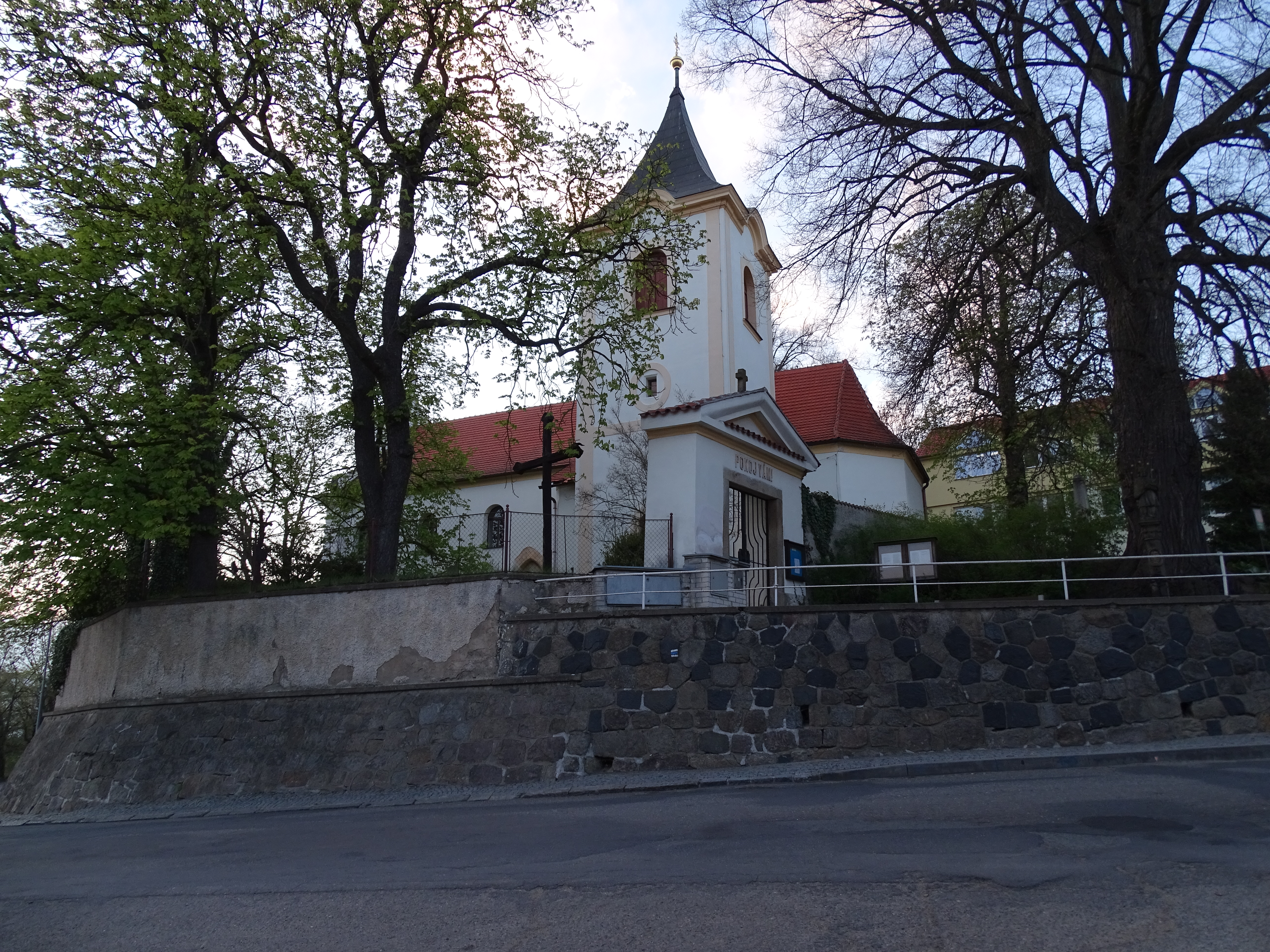
Church of Our Lady of the Snows

The main landmark of Velké Popovice is the Church of Our Lady of the Snows. It was probably founded in the 13th century and its current form is from the 17th century.
