= Velkopopovický Kozel =

Czech beer brewery

- Type: Beer
- Manufacturer: Pivovar Velké Popovice
- Distributor: Asahi Breweries
- Country of origin: Czechia
- Introduced: 1874
- Website: kozelbeer.com

Velkopopovický Kozel is a Czech beer produced since 1874. The brewery was founded in Velké Popovice, a town 25 km (15 mi) southeast of Prague. Their symbol is a goat (kozel means "male goat" in Czech). The company was bought by SABMiller in 2002 and sold to Asahi Breweries in 2016.

== History ==
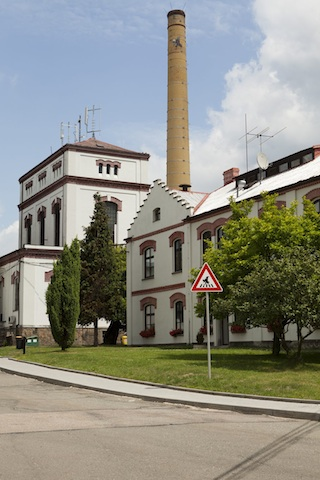
Velkopopovický Kozel brewery

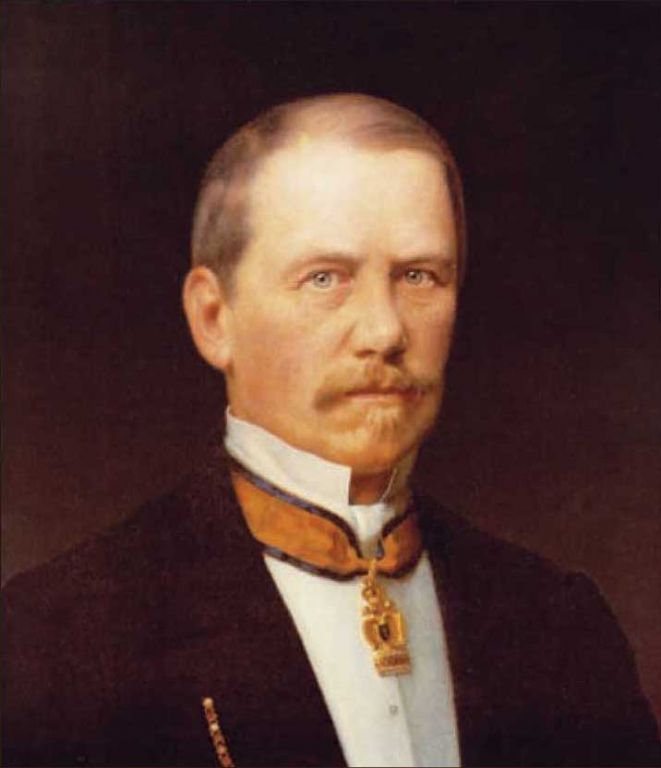
František Ringhoffer

The first historical mention of Velkopopovicky Kozel dates back to the 14th century. The brewery in Velké Popovice, as we know it today, has its origins in the 19th century. After years of disagreements and a gradual decline, the brewery was bought by a rich industrial tycoon, František Ringhoffer, who was the mayor of Smíchov and one of the most successful entrepreneurs at the time.

The brewery was built in 1875, though the first batch of Kozel beer had been brewed the previous year.

It survived the First World War, operating in a restricted mode and without much innovation, and it grew again in the interwar period. The Second World War brought new production restrictions for all breweries, and Kozel faced obstacles in acquiring the raw materials it needed.

After the war, the brewery was nationalized and experienced a lack of workers. In 1951, the company management solved this problem by employing women. The ratio of women to men remained almost 1:1 until 1962 and bottling was exclusively in female hands. In 1965, Kozel delivered the world's first beer in tank trucks and gave rise to the tradition of tank pubs.

After thirty years of socialism, the brewery achieved independence in 1991 and in 1992 became a public limited company. In 2002, Kozel and Radegast were acquired by Pilsner Urquell, part of the brewing conglomerate SABMiller. In 2016, it was one of the brands sold by SABMiller to Asahi, the divestment being a result of the acquisition of the former by ABInBev, to meet with global antitrust regulation.

In 2012, Kozel canned beer was the subject of viral advertising in Russia: launched into space, beer was dropped by parachute, and the event was filmed and transmitted online.

== Goat mascot ==
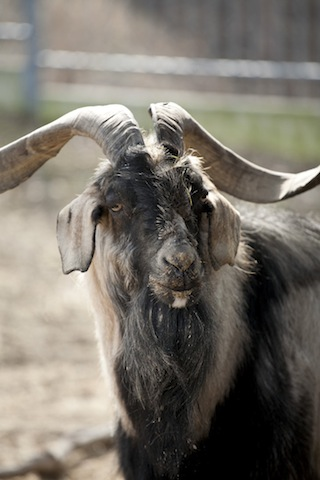
Kozel mascot Olda

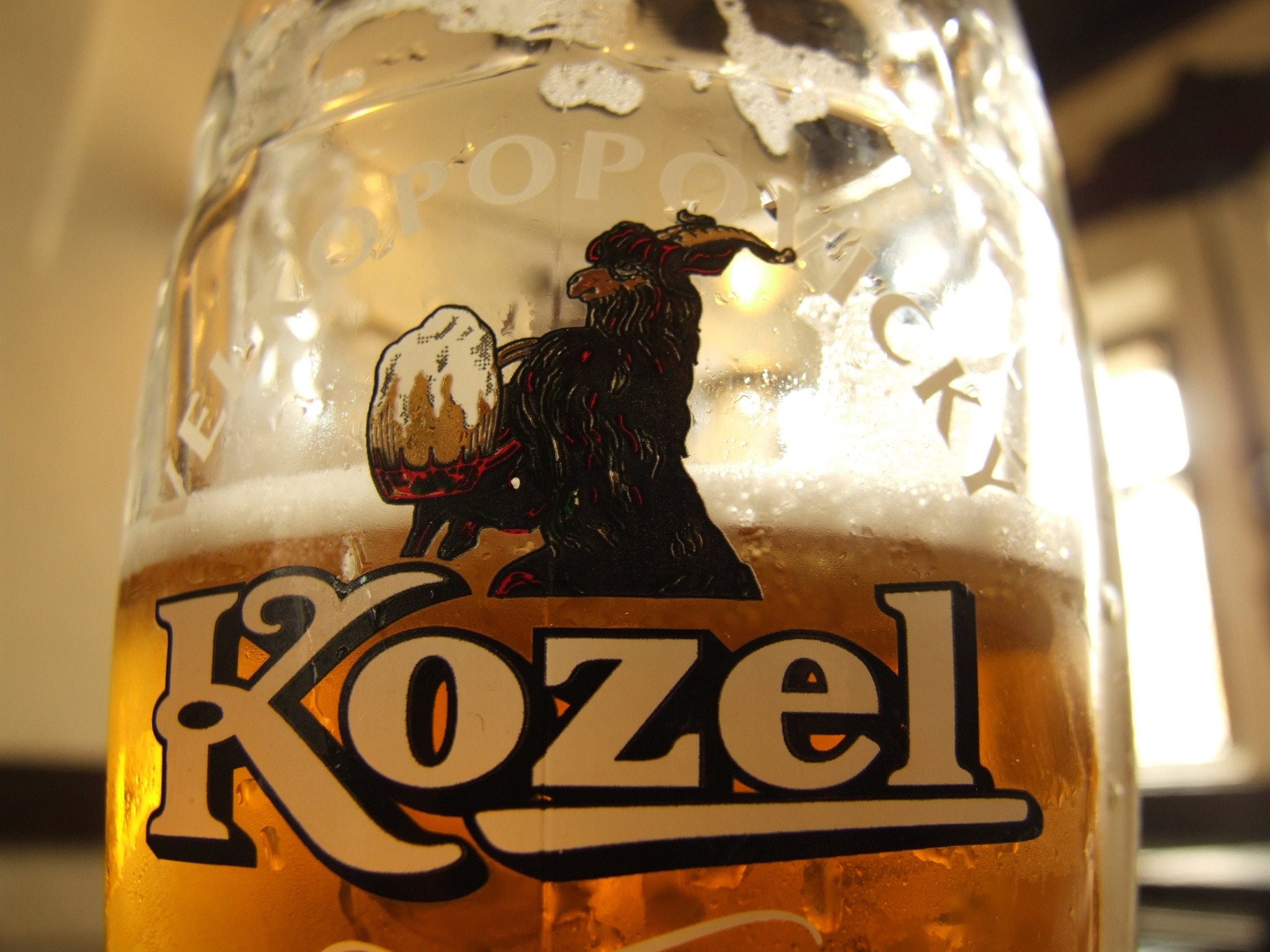
Olda depicted on a glass of Kozel

The name Kozel and its emblem have their origins in the period after the First World War. Kozel means "male goat" in Czech, and a dark beer was at that time called bock, which means "goat" in German.

During that period, there was a lot of competition in brewing. Kozel founder Emanuel Ringhoffer realized that it was necessary to distinguish his brewery from its competitors and started to produce a strong, dark beer in Velké Popovice, locally known as kozel. At that time a French painter passed through the town and was moved by the hospitality of the local people, and out of gratitude decided to create an emblem for the brewery, based on the figure of a goat. It was first introduced in 1922, and the mascot has decorated the label for close to a hundred years since.

In the 1930s, the owners tried to consolidate the position of the company, and to give it a more attractive image, they brought a live goat to the brewery as an attraction. The Kozel brewery has a live goat and other attractions for visitors to this day. From the 1970s, all the goats have been named after the original caregiver, Olda, and this name has been passed down from goat to goat for over forty years.

== Production ==
The company brews several different types of beer:

- Kozel 10 – a 10° pale draught beer, with 4.2% ABV.
- Kozel 11 – an 11° pale lager, with 4.6% ABV. It has been on the market since 2005.
- Kozel Černý – a dark draught beer with 3.8% ABV
- Kozel Řezaný – a mixture of light and dark lagers, with 4.6% ABV
- Kozel Mistrův Ležák – a 12° pale lager, with 4.8% ABV
- Kozel Mistrův Tmavý – a dark lager, with 4.4% ABV
- Kozel Nealko – a non-alcoholic beer, with max. 0.5% ABV
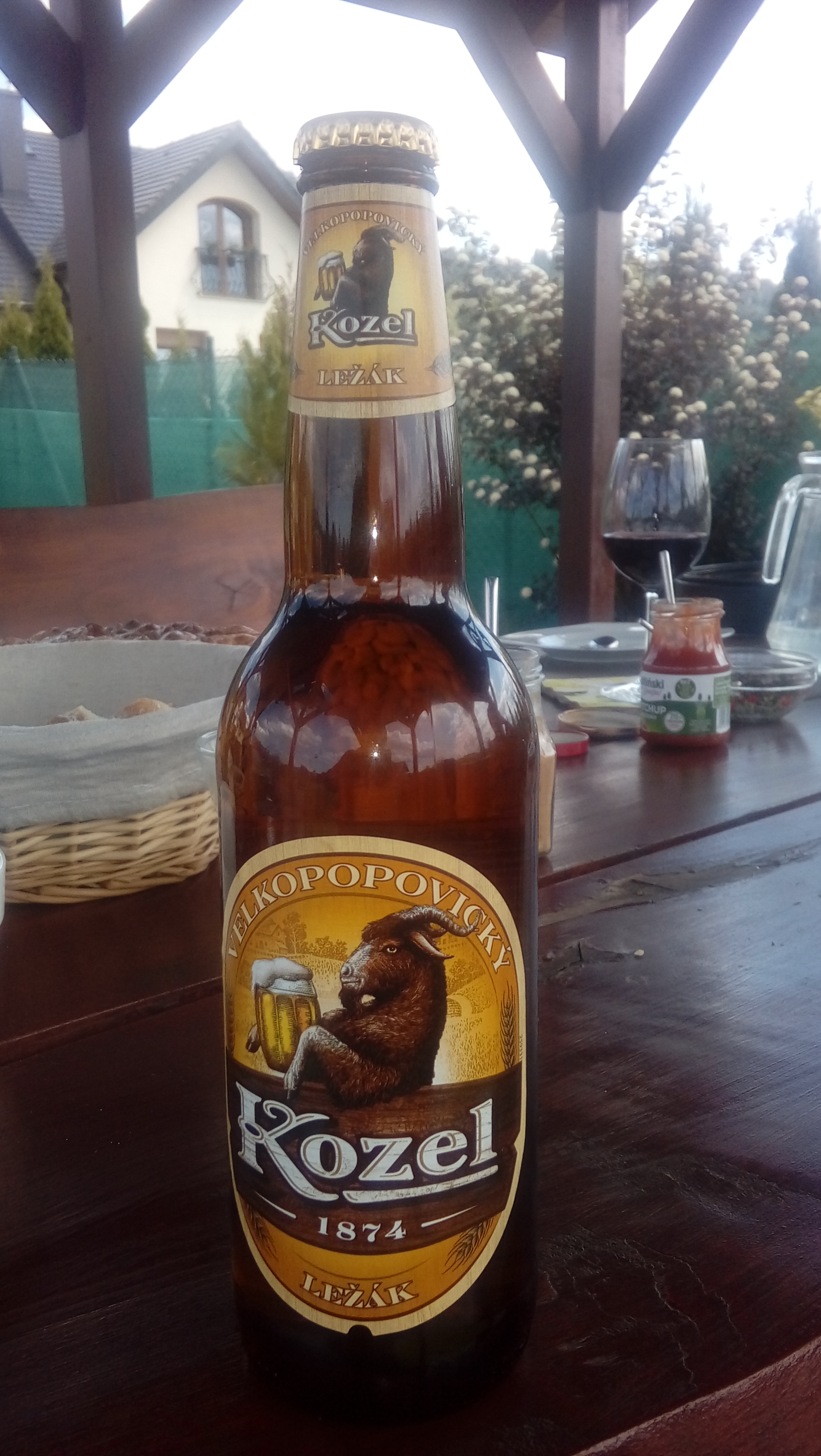
Kozel 10°

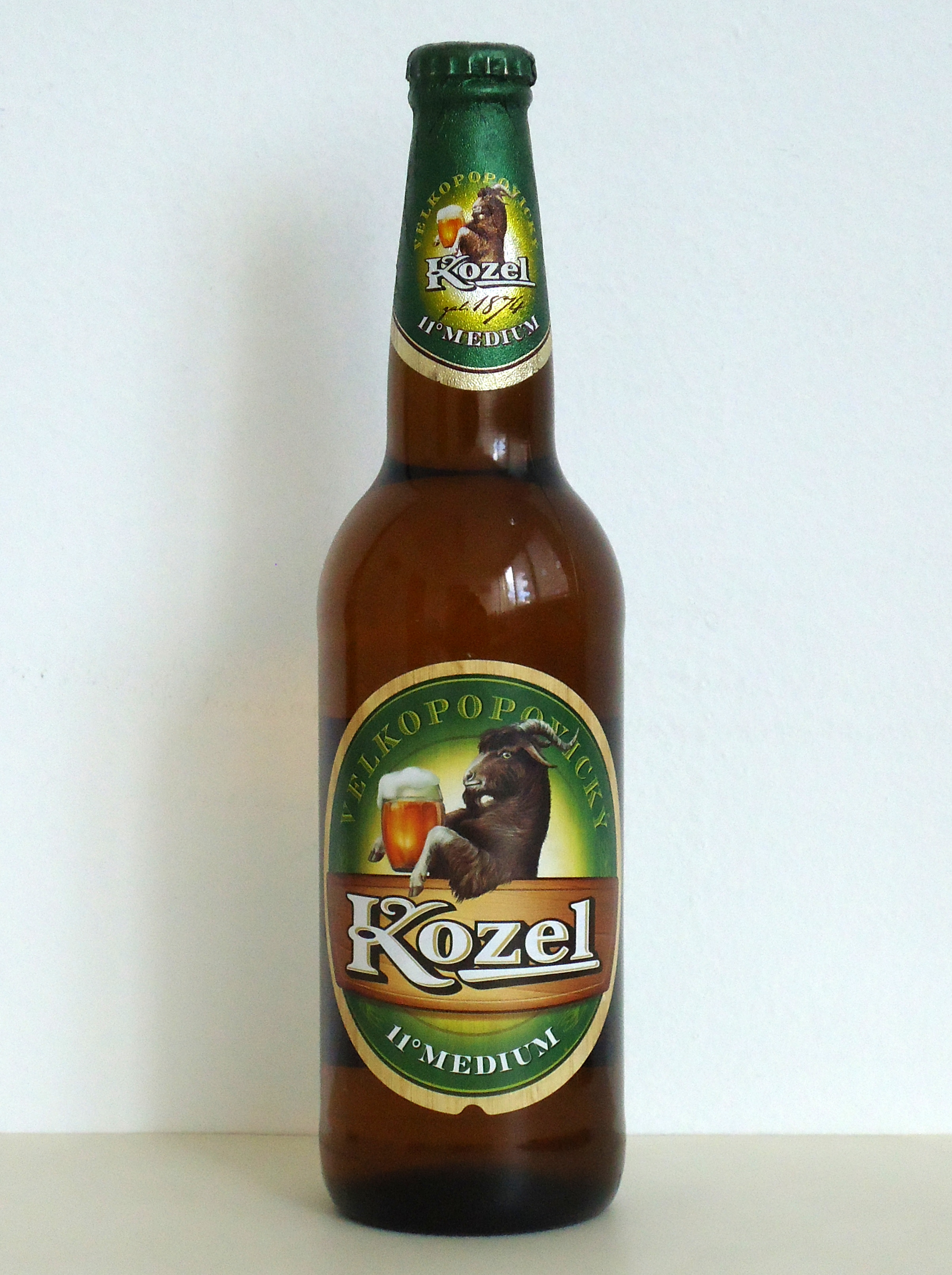
Kozel 11°

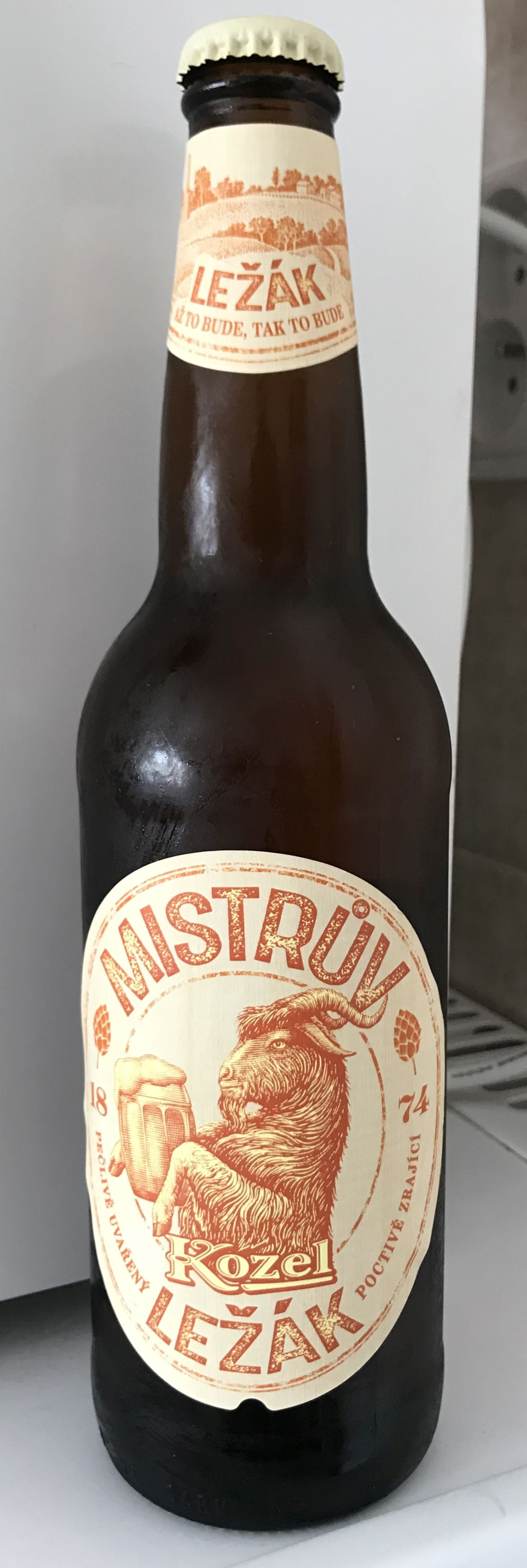
Kozel Mistrův Ležák

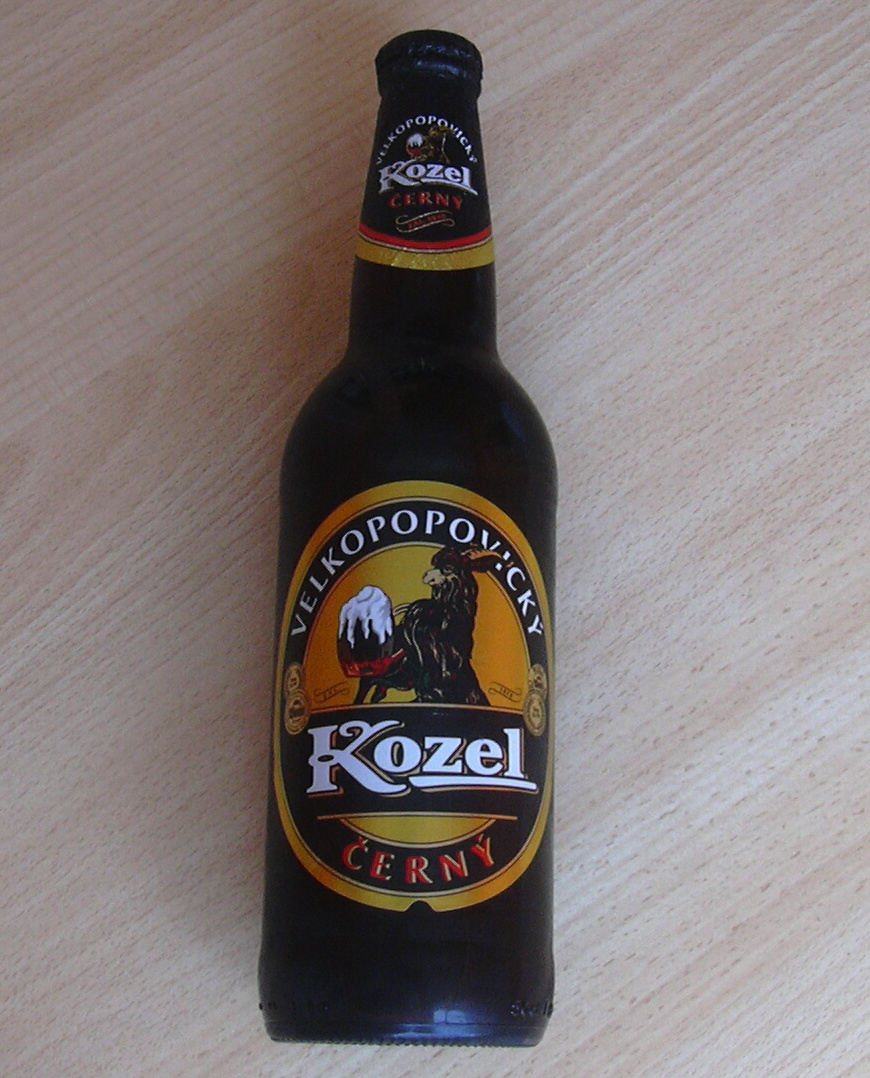
Kozel Černý

== Export and licensed production ==
Kozel is sold in about thirty countries worldwide, with licensed production in Slovakia, Russia, Hungary, Ukraine, and Turkey, among others.

== See also ==
- Beer in the Czech Republic
