= Popovice (Benešov District) =

- Municipality
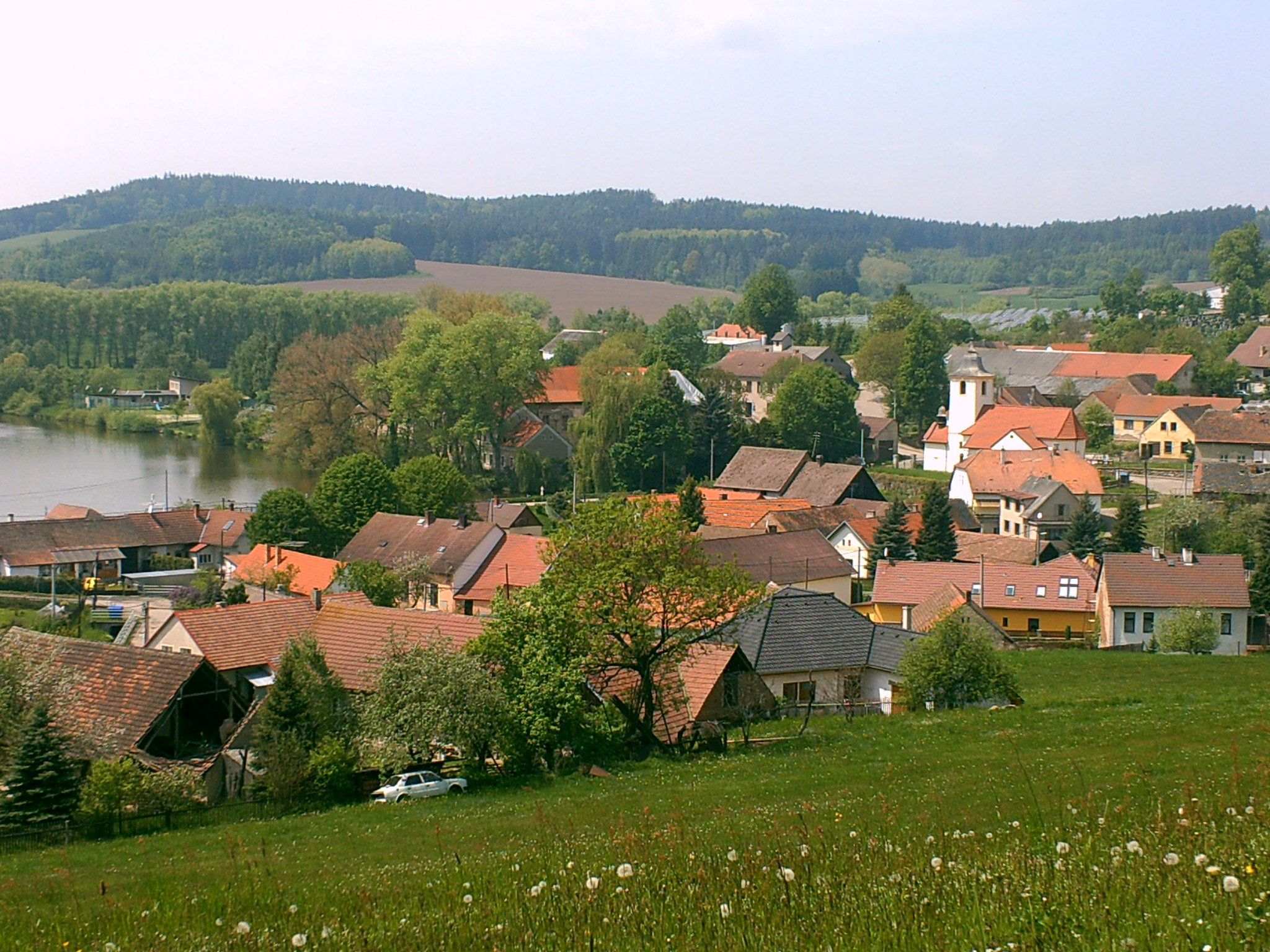
- General view

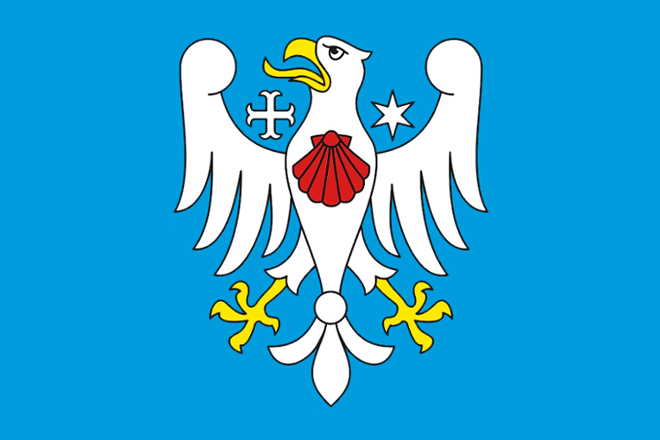
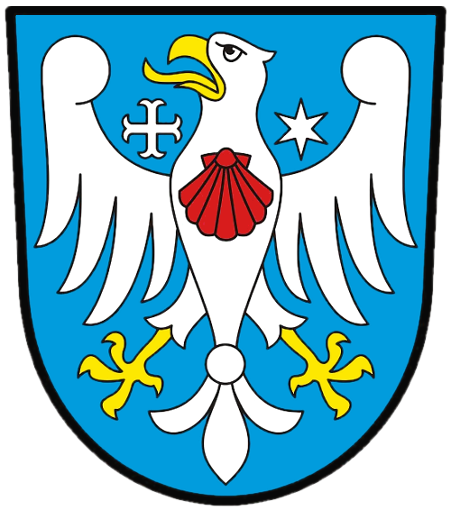
- Flag Coat of arms

- Location in the Czech Republic
- Coordinates: 49°41′44″N 14°45′9″E
- Country: Czech Republic
- Region: Central Bohemian
- District: Benešov
- First mentioned: 1295

Area
  - Total: 11.72 km^{2} (4.53 sq mi)
- Elevation: 435 m (1,427 ft)

Population (2026-01-01)
  - Total: 299
  - Density: 25.5/km^{2} (66.1/sq mi)
- Time zone: UTC+1 (CET)
  - Summer (DST): UTC+2 (CEST)
- Postal codes: 257 01, 257 03
- Website: www.popoviceubenesova.cz

Popovice is a municipality and village in Benešov District in the Central Bohemian Region of the Czech Republic. It has about 300 inhabitants.

== Administrative division ==
Popovice consists of six municipal parts (in brackets population according to the 2021 census):

- Popovice (146)
- Kamenná Lhota (16)
- Kondratice (6)
- Mladovice (73)
- Pazderná Lhota (10)
- Věžníčky (23)

== Etymology ==
The name is derived either from the personal name Pop or from the old Czech word pop (i.e. 'priest'), meaning "the village of Pop's/priest's people".

== Geography ==
Popovice is located about 11 kilometres (7 mi) southeast of Benešov and 41 km (25 mi) southeast of Prague. It lies in the Vlašim Uplands. The highest point is the hill Červíková skála at 578 m (1,896 ft) above sea level. The Chotýšanka River flows through the municipality. The village of Popovice lies on the shore of the fishpond Popovický rybník.

== History ==
The first written mention of Popovice is from 1295.

== Demographics ==
Historical population

Year	Pop.	±%
1869	1,229	—
1880	1,339	+9.0%
1890	1,230	−8.1%
1900	1,109	−9.8%
1910	1,118	+0.8%

Year	Pop.	±%
1921	1,054	−5.7%
1930	992	−5.9%
1950	607	−38.8%
1961	535	−11.9%
1970	450	−15.9%

Year	Pop.	±%
1980	337	−25.1%
1991	275	−18.4%
2001	259	−5.8%
2011	279	+7.7%
2021	274	−1.8%

Source: Censuses

== Transport ==
There are no railways or major roads passing through the municipality.

== Sights ==
The main landmark is the Church of Saint James the Great. It was built in the late Romanesque style and later rebuilt.

Popovice Fortress is a former fortress, rebuilt into a castle. This Baroque building also contains preserved Gothic and Renaissance elements and the torso of medieval walls.
