= Tea growing in Azerbaijan =

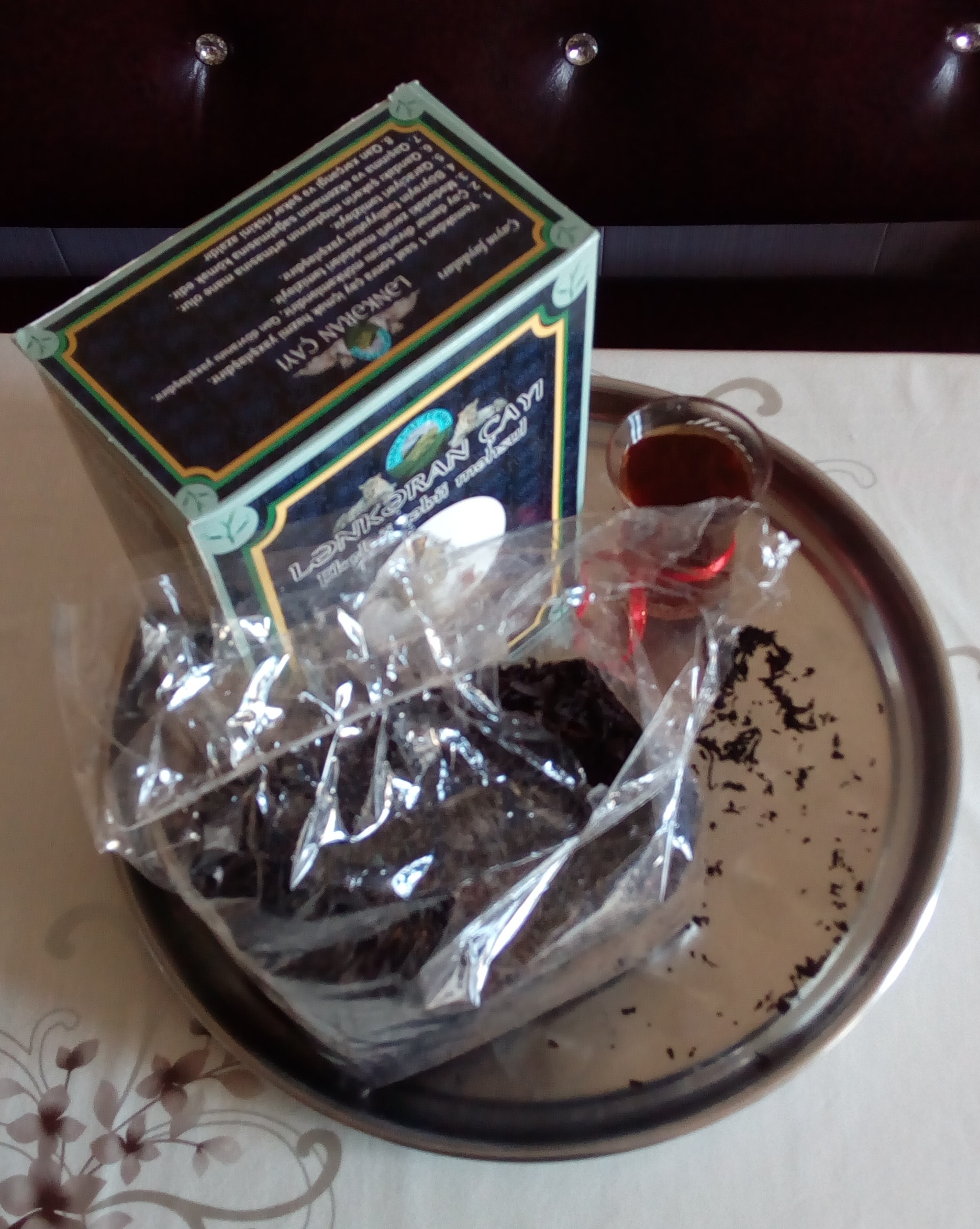
Tea from the Lankaran District

Tea growing in Azerbaijan is concentrated in an area of 5.33 thousand square kilometers located within the Lenkeran-Astara region, including the districts of Astara, Lankaran, Masalli, Lerik, Yardimli, and Jalilabad. Around 90% of Azerbaijan's tea is produced in Lankaran close to the southern border with Iran. Tea was first grown around the Caspian Sea region of Azerbaijan in the 1880s. Due to its favorable climatic conditions, the region now produces 99% of the Azerbaijani tea crop.

== History ==
Towards the end of the 19th century, M. O. Novoselov planted the first set of experimental tea bushes in the Lankaran District. In 1896 he established a tea factory. and by 1900 small experimental tea plantations had been set up in the area. In 1912, Novoselov wrote Russkiye subtropiki ('Russian subtropics'), which discussed the right conditions for growing tea in the district. After the failure of the enterprise in around 1920, the Azerbaijan Institute of Gardening and Subtropical Plants initiated a study on tea growing. As part of their development of the tea industry, the Soviets increased tea production in the area around Lenkaran and Zakatala.

In May 1949, ministers in Moscow set out plans to develop tea plant in the Azerbaijan SSR to increase tea production in the USSR by developing the land. The resultant increase in production of domestic tea in Georgia (country), Krasnodar Krai and Azerbaijan grew by 1988 to 38.5 thousand tons, mainly of black tea. A plan that was proposed to advance the tea plantations further was approved and implemented by Technical-Economic Experts’ Council of the State Plan Committee of the Soviet Union in 1953. It involved a full plan to improve production facilities, machinery tools, and irrigation, all of which resulted in increased productivity. Lövəyin, Khanbulanchay, and Vileshchay are now the main contributors for supplying water.

In 1982, 26 thousand tons of tea was produced, with tea-growing in Azerbaijan covering an area of 9.3 thousand hectares in 1983, mostly being green tea, but with black tea commonly grown in Lankaran District. At this time 65 to 70% of the local dry tea demands were being fulfilled, with the sector employing 65,000 to 70,000 workers. In 1987, the Azerbaijan Government implemented an edict to enhance tea production in the country, with a plan to expand tea production to 21,000 hectares by 2000. so increasing green tea yield to 80–90,000 tons and dry tea yield to 20–22,000 tons. However, events such as the collapse of the USSR and the first Nagorno-Karabakh War, tea production in Azerbaijan fell, reducing 1,200 tons by 1995.

== Current production ==
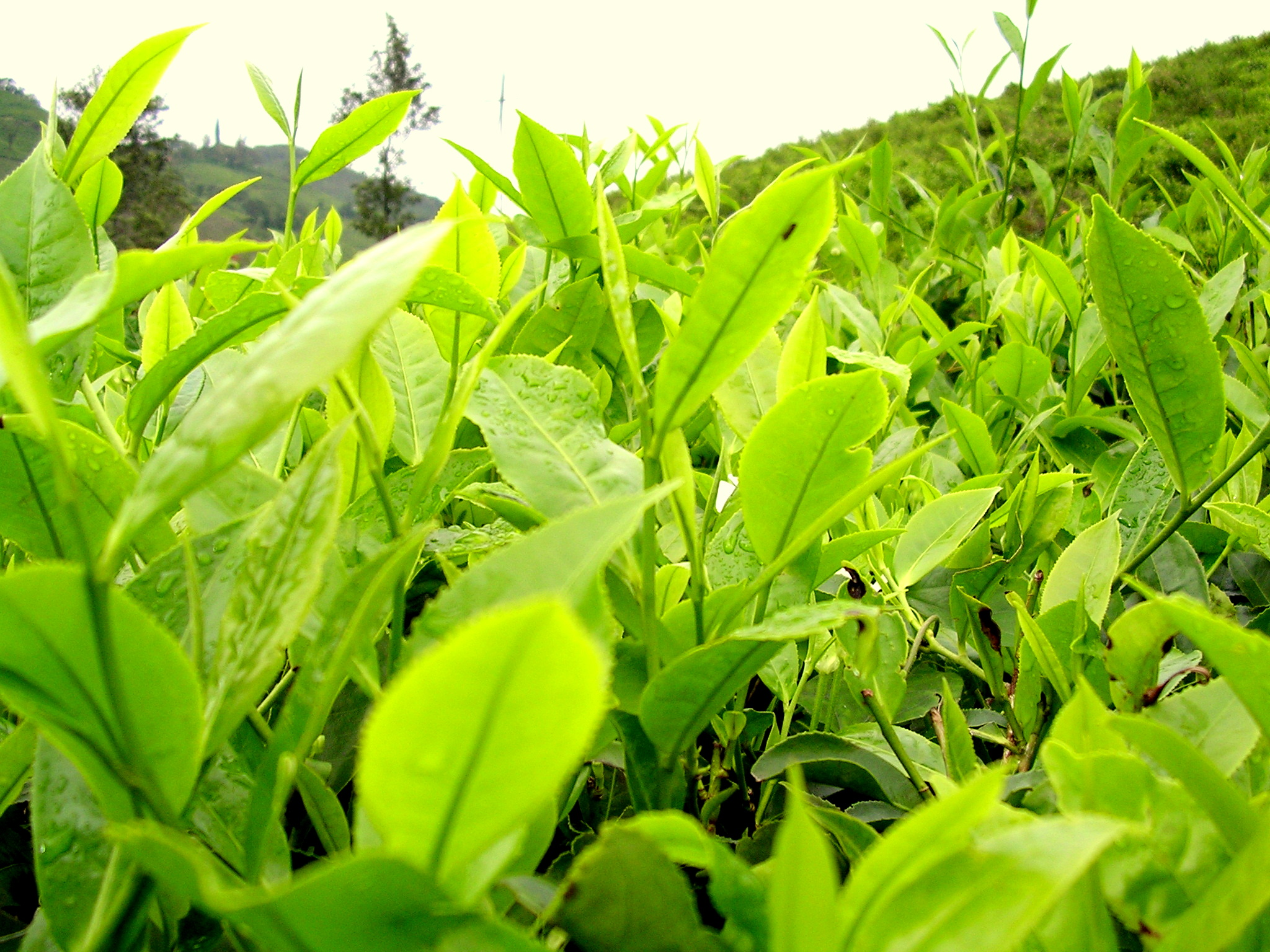
Green tea growing

Azerbaijan's tea plantations lie between the Caspian Sea and the Talysh Mountains, in a region where the subtropical climate and humidity make it an ideal location growing tea. The main tea-growing areas are situated in the districts of Lankaran, Astara, Lerik, Masalli, Zakatala, and Balakan. Azerbaijani tea is produced mainly for internal consumption, but it is also exported to Turkey, the Russian republic of Dagestan, and Georgia.

In the Sheki-Zagatala economic-geographical region growth in the sector is relatively weak. Recent reports suggest the weather conditions in Southern Caucasus might be able to support new tea plantations, and areas have been earmarked by the government for future expansion. Government initiatives to help reinvigorate production are expected by 2021 to have led to a doubling of the size of land used to grow tea.

== Tea industry ==
The tea-packing factory Sun Tea Azerbaijan, which has been in continuous operation since 1996, is the largest tea-packing factory in the CIS. The regional leader in South Caucasus, its annual production is around 15 thousand tons. The company produces a pure green tea leaf at its primary tea treatment factories at Lenkaran and Astara, which deal with leaf drying, twisting, fermenting, dry sorting and packaging. It mainly produces packaged teas, green teas, and fruit teas. Tea is exported to the Caucasus, central Asia, and the CIS, primarily Russia.

For its premier brand, Azerçay, the company uses leaves from locally situated tea plantations, or from India, Vietnam, or Kenya. Its factory in Baku obtains high-quality Ceylon teas through its Inter Tea from Sri Lanka. The factory mainly uses a mixture of Ceylon and Indian teas to make several types of tea, each with a different quality and composition.

== Tea culture ==
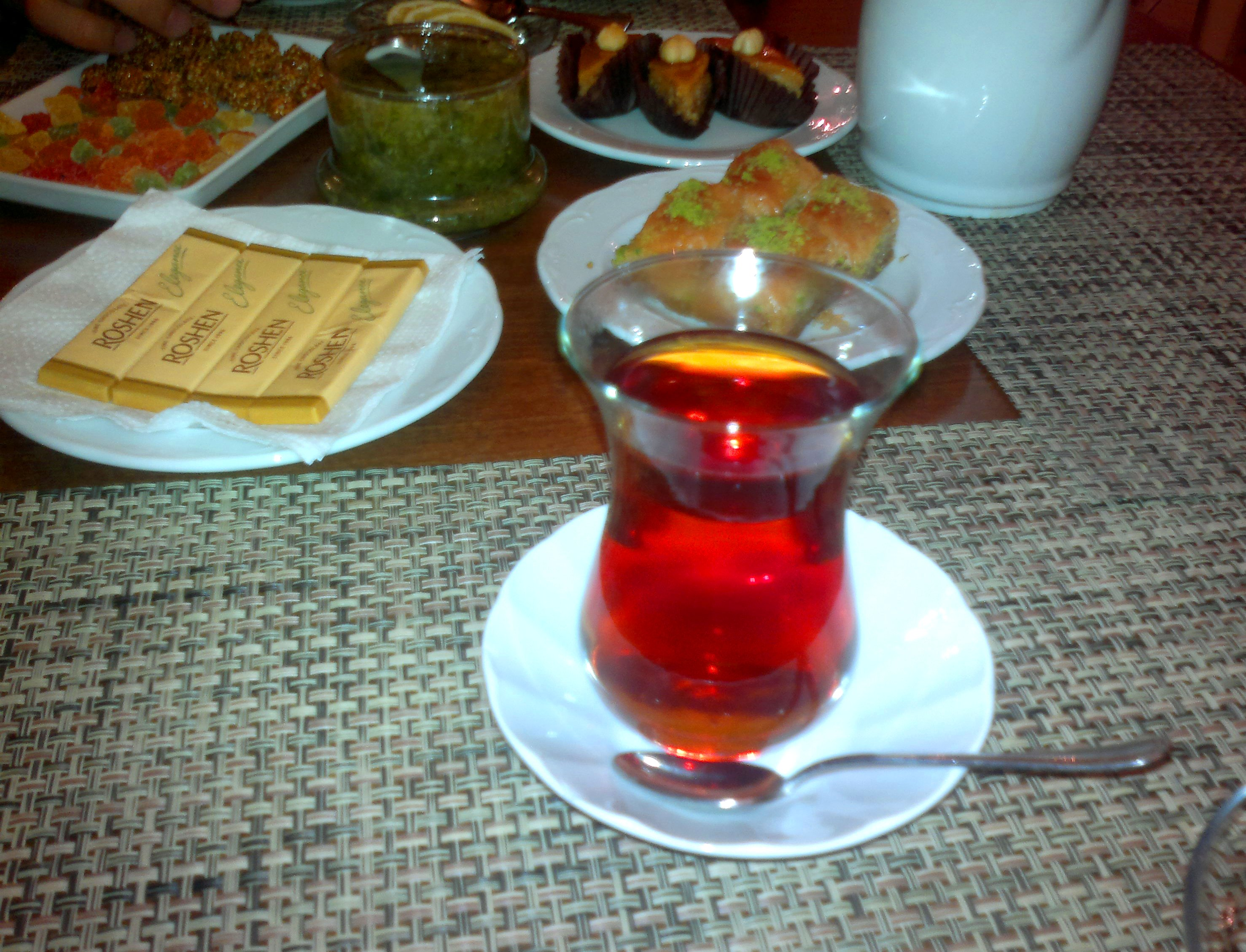
Tea served in a traditional Armudu glass

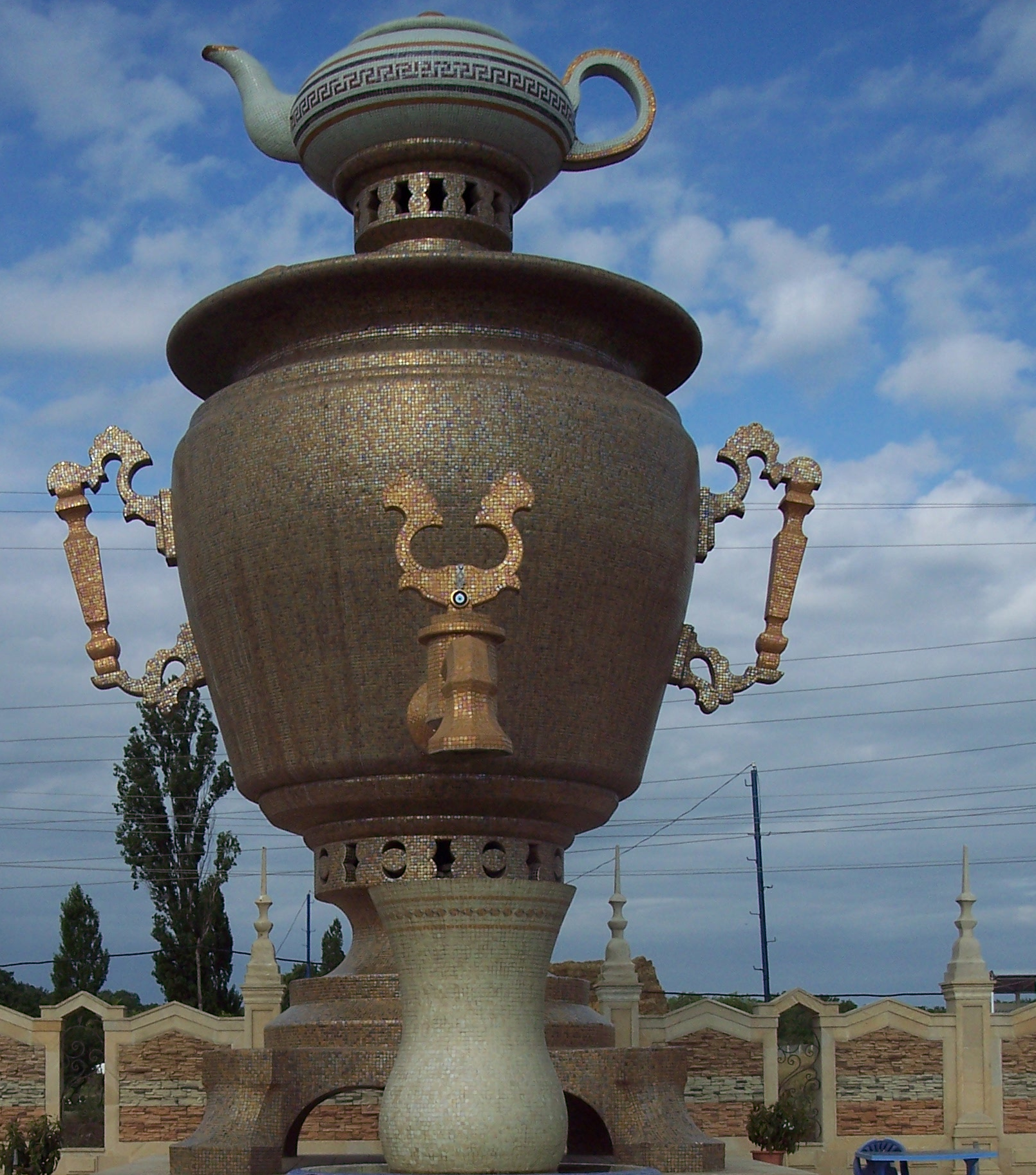
A huge samovar in the Azerbaijani city of Khachmaz

Azerbaijani greatly enjoy drinking tea, known as chay, and still maintain their ancient and traditional tea ceremonies when drinking what is their main beverage of daily life. It is common in Azerbaijan for a guest to be welcomed firstly by black tea, often served in a pear-shaped crystal Armudu glass, which is said to keep tea hot longer at the bottom and cool more rapidly at the top. In Azerbaijani culture, serving tea at the beginning of a meal is a symbol of hospitality. Sweetened tea is preferred to regular tea. By custom, sugar is never dissolved directly as a method of sweetening it. Instead, a sugar cube is dipped slightly into the tea before it is sipped, a custom that began in medieval times, when the presence of Toxins in the tea was detected in this way, when they reacted with the sugar. Azerbaijani people also enjoy flavouring their tea with spices, such as cinnamon, lemon or ginger. Tea is made using fragrant herbs to produce corn silk tea, mint tea, cinnamon tea, saffron tea, ginger tea, dog-rose tea, hawthorn tea, and thyme tea. Tea is often served with jams made from figs, strawberries, apricots, walnuts, and blackberries, called dishleme ('bite'), a tradition designed to help the flow of conversation.

Because of the high demand for tea in Azerbaijan, almost every neighborhood has a tea house, known as a chaykhana. The tea house's chaykhor ('tea connoisseur') always knows that a good tea has to have a deep burgundy colour. Purrengi ('velvet tea') is the most common type of tea served in such establishments.

Historically, chaykhan were mainly male-dominated establishments, as women were not permitted not enter public places. The term chaykhana denotes a place where men have tea, and this cultural tradition persists in Azerbaijan in the same way that Pubs in Britain once excluded women. Chaykhanas maintain the tradition of being places where men go to discuss politics or other important issues over a game of backgammon.

The drinking of tea in Azerbaijan often features during important occasions such as the celebration of an engagement, a marriage, the birth of a child, or a funeral.

== Law on tea-growing ==
A state program on the development of tea growing from 2018 to 2027 was approved on 12 February 2018, with the aim of developing tea production, increasing the export potential of the industry, and ensuring the employment prospects of the rural population.

== See also ==
- Azerbaijani tea culture
- Tea production in Bangladesh
- Tea production in Indonesia
- Tea production in Kenya
- Tea production in Nepal
- Tea production in Sri Lanka
- Tea production in Uganda
- Tea production in the United States
