= Nepali tea =

Beverage made from Nepali tea plants

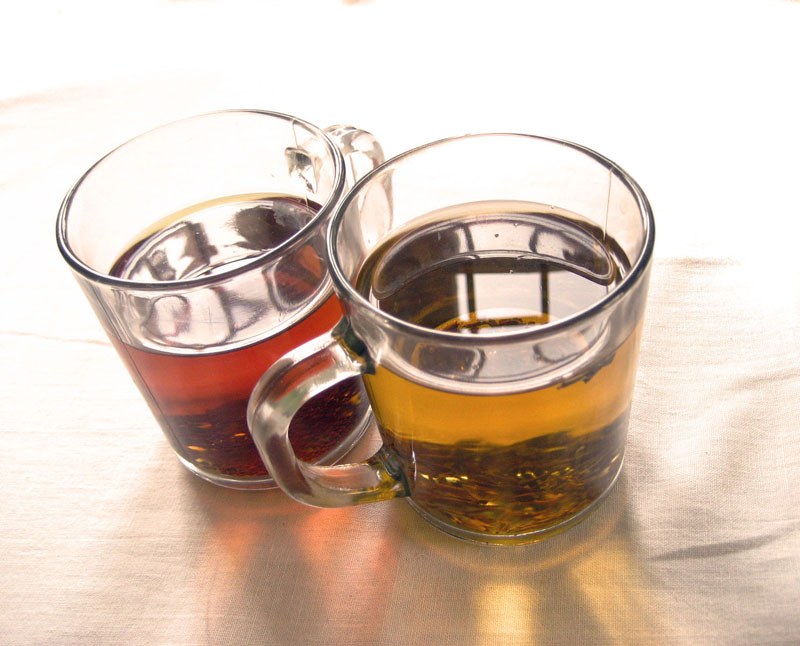
CTC and Orthodox tea

Nepali tea is a beverage made from the leaves of tea plants (Camellia sinensis) grown in Nepal. They are distinctive in appearance, aroma and taste, but are similar in many ways to Darjeeling tea, which is produced over the border in India. Its relatively smaller production quantities mean that teas from Nepal are less well known than those from Darjeeling.

Nepal's teas fall into two types of tea: Orthodox tea and Crush, tear, curl tea.

== Orthodox tea ==
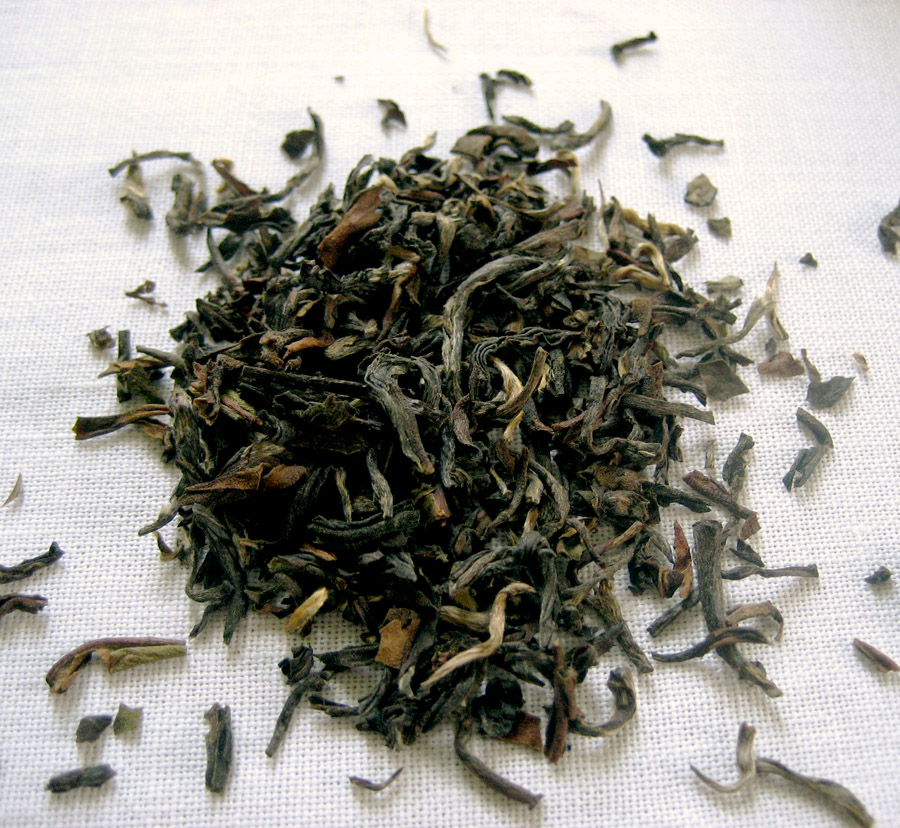
Orthodox tea

Orthodox tea is – as Darjeeling Tea – made from the Chinese Variety of the tea plant (C. sinensis var. sinensis). The tea is hand- or machine-rolled. Most speciality teas like green tea, oolong tea, white tea and hand rolled tea fall under the category of orthodox tea. In Nepal, orthodox tea is produced and processed in the mountainous regions of Nepal at an altitude ranging from 3,000 to 7,000 feet above the sea level. There are six major districts, primarily in the eastern regions of Nepal that are known for producing quality orthodox tea, which are Ilam, Panchthar, Dhankuta, Terhathum, Sindhulpalchok and Kaski.

Orthodox tea in Nepal is characterized by four flushes:

- First flush, begins in the fourth week of March and continues until the end of April. The leaves are tender and the liquor is light yellowish green in color, having a delicate taste with subtle aroma and flavor. The first flush is more expensive, because of its light and delicate flavor, but also due to the fact that it is produced in low quantity and the demand outstrips the supply.
- Second flush, starts during the second week of May and lasts until the last week of July. In the second flush the leaves gain more strength and exhibits the main characteristics of tea in contrast to the first flush tea. Some experts state that the best tea is made during the second flush.
- Monsoon flush, also referred as "Rainy tea" begins immediately after the second flush, that is around the last week of July and continues until the end of September. The monsoon tea, due to the continuous rain, exhibits a very intense and dark fusion as the tea develops its full color and strength, resulting in a full bodied tea. It is often recommended.
- Autumn flush, usually begins in October and lasts until the end of November. The autumn tea gives a combination of musky flavors, tangy aromas and an amber liquor.

== CTC tea ==
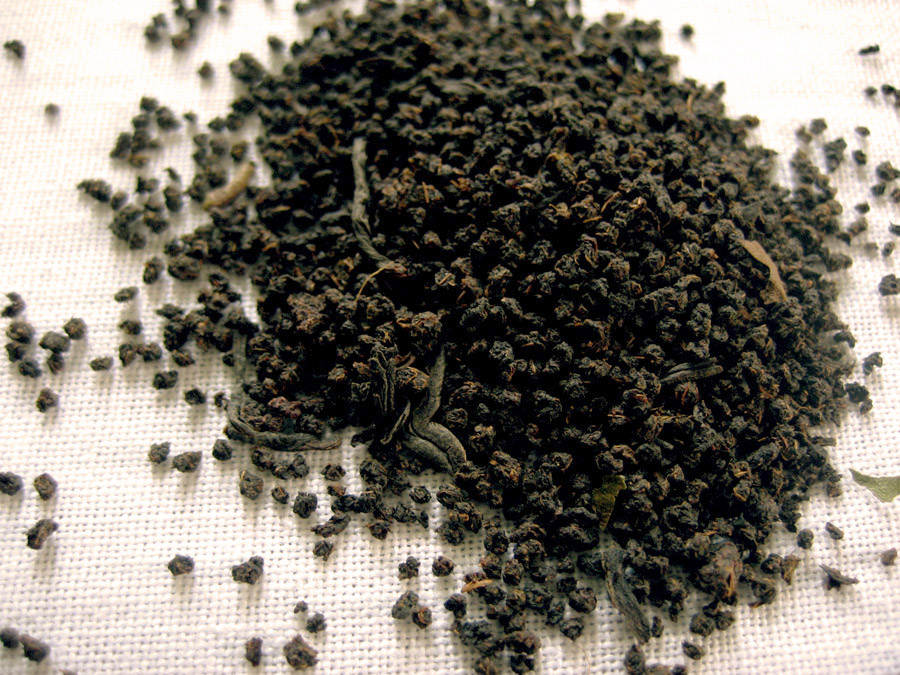
CTC (Crush, Tear, Curl) tea

Crush, tear, curl (CTC) tea is a method of processing Assam variety (Camellia sinensis var. assamica), which grows in the lower-altitude, hot and humid plains of Nepal, primarily in Jhapa district. It accounts for almost 95% of the domestic consumption, owing to its lower cost of production compared with orthodox tea.

The Nepal CTC tea is also characterized by four pronounced flushes, the First, Second, Monsoon and Autumn flushes, but unlike the orthodox tea, the CTC tea is more or less uniform throughout, often exhibiting a strong color and subtle aroma after infusion. However, the flushes do not begin and end in accordance with that of the orthodox tea, mainly because of differences in local conditions.

== History ==
=== During the Rana dynasty ===
During the 1800s and the early 1900s, Nepal was under the reign of a highly centralized autocracy, the Rana Dynasty, which acted as a monarchy; their policies resulted in the isolation of Nepal from the external world. Nepal's borders and governance were constantly under turmoil, both internally and externally. Unlike India, the policies helped Nepal retain its national independence from the British colonial rule, but isolated it from modernization and economic development. Thus the nascent Nepali tea industry was adversely affected compared with the nearby Darjeeling tea industry, which thrived under the British colonial rule.

It is believed that the first tea bushes in Nepal were grown from seeds which were given as a gift by the Chinese Emperor to the then Prime Minister of Nepal, Jung Bahadur Rana. Nevertheless, Nepal's tea industry owes its roots to the colonization of India, by the world's first multinational company, the "East India Company", under the British Empire. Around 1863, within 10 years of the first tea plantation being set up in Darjeeling, hybrids of tea bushes were brought, and the Nepal's first tea plantation, Ilam Tea Estate was set up in Ilam district, at an altitude of 4,500–5,000 feet above the sea level. Visioning better future prospects of the tea industry in Nepal, two years later a second tea plantation, Soktim Tea Estate was set up in Ilam district. Later into the 1900s the Nepali tea producers acted as suppliers to Darjeeling factories when tea bushes became old and yields decreased.

However, the nascent tea industry of Nepal failed to grow. At a time when the Darjeeling tea industry was beginning to do very well in the global mercantilist market, the tea industry of Nepal failed to provide even for the domestic consumption. The reason for the setback of the Nepal's young tea industry was mainly due to political turmoil and resulting economic policies of that period, under the reign of the Rana dynasty.

=== After the Rana dynasty ===
During the 1950s, there was a shift in the political scenario of Nepal. A new constitution was written to develop a democratic system. Despite failure in successful democratization, Nepal's economy at least opened up to the rest of the world. As a result, the stagnant tea industry witnessed an inflow of public and private investment. The first private tea plantation was set up in 1959, in the terai region under the name Bhudhakaran Tea Estate.

In 1966, the Nepal Tea Development Corporation (NTDC) was set up to aid the development of the tea industry. Originally, tea leaves produced in Nepal were sold to factories in Darjeeling, as the Darjeeling tea bushes had become old, leading to the deterioration of the processed tea. The Nepali tea leaves were therefore a valuable input for the factories in and around Darjeeling. Finally in 1978, the first factory in Nepal was set up in Ilam for the processing of tea leaves and a few years later another factory was set up in Soktim, Ilam district. From 1978 to the 1990s, various efforts were made by the Nepal Tea Development Corporation with the Overseas Development Administration (ODA), to encourage the participation of small and marginal farmers in the growth and production of tea as a cash crop. As a result, today the small and marginal farmers constitute the majority percentage share in Nepal's tea industry. Slowly, the stagnant tea industry was evolving into a fully commercialized industry, benefitting the country's economic and socio-economic development. To further aid in the development of its tea industry, in 1982, His Majesty's Government of Nepal under the reign of the then King of Nepal Birendra Bir Bikram Shah Dev, declared five districts – Jhapa, Ilam, Panchthar, Dhankuta and Terhathum as Tea Zones of Nepal.

Logo that was developed for CTC tea, green tea, and orthodox tea in accordance with the provision of National Tea Policy 2000

From 1987 to 1993, some of today's notable institutions were incorporated to further aid the Nepal Tea Development Corporation in the development of a century old stagnant tea industry, like – National Tea and Coffee Development Board (NTCDB), Nepal Tea Planters' Association (NTPA) and Himalayan Orthodox Tea Producers' Association (HOTPA). In 1997, Nepal's tea industry saw a major transformation towards privatization, with the privatization of the plantations and factories under the Nepal Tea Development Corporation (NTDC).

Since the late 1990s and into the early 2000s, an array of international non-governmental organizations (like – Winrock, SNV, GTZ etc.) have become involved with the stakeholders of Nepal's tea industry, because the tea industry in Nepal also played a significant role in the eradication of poverty, especially in the rural areas where the tea plantations were concentrated. By the 21st century the stagnant tea industry had transformed into a fully commercialized industry, yet it had not yet developed a strong brand in the global market, lacking efficiently integrated production and marketing systems.

Hence, in 2000 as per the provisions of the National Tea and Coffee Development Board Act of 1992, the Government of Nepal ratified the National Tea Policy. The National Tea Policy focussed on the following five main broad topics: –

1. Production and processing
2. Market and trade promotion
3. Institutional arrangement
4. Manpower development
5. Development and promotion of auxiliary industries

== Present ==
Today, Nepal's tea industry is dominated by private interests with the first private orthodox factory, Bhudkharan tea private limited being established in 1960, whereas in the 1980s the tea industry was a Government monopoly prior to the liberalization of the tea industry. Until 2000, Nepal's tea exports accounted for only about 100 – 150 tons per annum. However, due to the liberalization adopted about a decade ago, Nepal's tea industry witnessed an exponential rise in tea exports, accounting for almost 4,000 – 5,000 tons per annum.

At present, Nepal produces approximately 16.29 million kilograms of tea per annum on an area of 16,718 hectares. It accounts for only 0.4% of the total world tea output. Tea is taken as self-dependent cash crop in agroforestry practice and is found as the most important example of the long term sustainable farming. The main tea producing regions in Nepal are Jhapa, Ilam, Panchthar, Dhankuta, Terhathum with newly involved regions being Kaski, Dolakha, Kavre, Sindhupalchok, Bhojpur, Solukhumbu and Nuwakot, with a goal of increasing the total tea production in Nepal. Nepal's teas are mainly exported to India, Pakistan, Australia, Germany, France, Poland the Netherlands, Japan, Belgium and the United States of America.

Himalayan Orthodox Tea Producers Association (HOTPA), the association of orthodox tea producers of Nepal, realizing the potential of the Nepali orthodox tea in the global market, has been adopting various measures to improve the quality and marketing of orthodox tea. In 2003, Himalayan Tea Producers Co-operative Limited (HIMCOOP), the marketing wing of the Himalayan Orthodox Tea Producers Association (HOTPA), was set up to assist in the marketing of Nepali tea. Similarly, in 2006, the Himalayan Orthodox Tea Producers Association (HOTPA) implemented the Code of Conduct. The main objective of the Code of Conduct was to increase the standards of Nepali orthodox tea to an international level. The main principles of the Code of Conduct are:-

1. Respect towards nature
2. Respect towards human
3. Respect towards production system
4. Respect towards quality

Farmers are now supported by the National Tea and Coffee Development Board created by the Nepali Ministry of Agriculture. A national tea policy was introduced by the NTCDB in 2000 which aimed to create more access to credit and land for farmers producing tea. Orthodox tea now provides a source of sustainability for almost 20 000 farmers in Nepal.

== Cultivation ==
Cultivated in hilly areas and in high altitudes is conducive for the highest quality tea. In Nepal, the Eastern mountainous regions host most of the orthodox (as opposed to crush, tear and curl) tea crops at altitudes approximating 3000–7000 feet above sea level. Nepal has six districts in which Orthodox tea is produced; Ilam, Dhankuta, Kaski, Terhathum, Sindhupalchok, and Panchthar. Among these districts there are a small number of medium-to-large scale tea estates as well as a large number of small holder farmers. Once the tea plant reaches maturity, its leaves can be harvested around four to five times a year, for many years. The different harvests of tea are called flushes. In Nepal there are four separate flushes in a growing season; first flush, second flush, monsoon flush, and autumn flush.

=== Pesticide use ===
There is no Maximum Residue Limit (MRL) for pesticide in place. However, in the last decade numerous poisonous chemicals such as monocrotophos, quinalphos, ethion, and phorate have been prohibited (as of May 2005).

An Integrated Pest Management (IPM) approach is becoming more popular as an alternative to pesticide application. The IPM approach includes the use of bio fertilizers, vermin-compost, and organic farming. The lack of internal regulation of pesticide use adversely affects the commodity in terms of trade potential.

=== Value-added and organic farming ===
The United States Department of International Development recommended increasing the productivity of tea cultivation in Nepal by updating the out of date machinery that most processing factories currently use. Other interventions proposed include the introduction of motorized pruning devices to reduce labour and increase productivity with respect to time. A more recent obstacle that is limiting small farmers is the issue of pesticide use and achieving organic certification. The belief in Nepal is that becoming a certified organic farmer, a costly and time-consuming process, will yield significant increases in profit However, with organic tea production, yields decrease and labour increases significantly during initial stages of adaptation. In the end, the major problem for most tea farmers in Nepal is that they occupy the primary or secondary industry. Small tea farmers do not have the means to add value to their tea through processing and packaging; they rely on outside agents to purchase their bulk leaves.

== Economic effects ==
The transition from subsistence farming to cash crop farming of orthodox tea provides a benefit to hillside farmers in terms of financial support and involvement in the domestic market. Many traditional farmers have given up subsistence farming and now specialize in solely growing tea. The profits that come from selling tea can then be used to purchase staple foods in a domestic market. The switch from traditional farming to cash cropping has reduced poverty rates among small holder farmers in tea growing. 70% of orthodox tea produced in Nepal in 2006 was by small farms. Orthodox tea is a profitable crop that is unique to hillside farmers. Forecasts by the NTCDB predict that by 2022 orthodox tea exports will reach 27 million kg, compared to the 2012 figure of 3 million kg. The paired growth in the tea sector will employ approximately 100 000 people. Engagement in overseas markets will allow Nepali tea producers to capitalize on their product's high quality and value as a niche product. Nepali orthodox tea is being sold well below premium to bordering countries such as India. A metric ton of Nepali green tea is valued at $1,180 in India, but $12,000 in the US. Thus, in order for Nepali farmers and producers of orthodox tea to make the most money from this crop there is a need to export to countries like the US who pay premium prices for the product.

=== Comparison with Darjeeling tea ===
Nepali tea, especially the varieties grown in the eastern regions like Ilam, shares several geographical and climatic similarities with the renowned Darjeeling tea from neighboring India. However, there are distinct advantages and unique characteristics that set Nepali tea apart.

==== Geographical and climatic similarities ====
Both Darjeeling and eastern Nepal, particularly the Ilam district, are part of the broader Eastern Himalayan region. This area is known for its rich biodiversity and the specific climatic conditions that are ideal for growing the Chinese variety of the Camellia sinensis tea plant. These conditions contribute to the unique muscatel flavor, a feature prized in Darjeeling teas, and similarly found in teas from Ilam.

=== Unique selling propositions of Ilam tea ===
Ilam teas are noted for their unique flavor profile, which includes a slightly nutty and floral taste with a hint of sweetness that enhances their appeal compared to the more traditional Darjeeling flavors. This unique profile is a result of the younger tea gardens in Ilam, which benefit from fresher soil and less depleted nutrients compared to the older gardens of Darjeeling.

=== Production and quality ===
The orthodox teas from Ilam are predominantly hand-rolled or processed using traditional methods that help preserve the integrity of the tea leaves and their flavor profile. Unlike the mass production often seen in Darjeeling due to high global demand, Ilam tea production is generally smaller scale, which allows for more meticulous attention to quality and sustainability practices.

=== Eco-friendly practices ===
Ilam's tea production is notable for its commitment to eco-friendly practices. The tea gardens employ organic farming methods, avoiding the use of harmful chemicals and pesticides. This not only ensures a cleaner, safer end product but also aligns with the increasing global consumer preference for sustainable and ethically produced goods.

=== Economic value ===
Despite its high quality, Ilam tea is generally more affordable than Darjeeling tea, offering global consumers excellent value for money. This affordability, combined with its high quality, positions Ilam tea as a compelling alternative to Darjeeling tea in the international market.

These factors contribute to Ilam tea's position in the specialty tea market, particularly among consumers interested in sustainability and artisanal production. Ilam tea has gained international recognition within the specialty tea market, which may influence demand and prices for Nepalese tea.

== See also ==
- Tea production in Azerbaijan
- Tea production in Bangladesh
- Tea production in Indonesia
- Tea production in Kenya
- Tea production in Sri Lanka
- Tea production in Uganda
- Tea production in the United States
