= Sreemangal Tea Auction Center =

Tea auction center in Bangladesh

- Type: Public
- Industry: Tea
- Founded: December 8, 2017; 8 years ago
- Headquarters: Sreemangal

Sreemangal Tea Auction Center (Bengali: শ্রীমঙ্গল চা নিলাম কেন্দ্র, romanized: Srimongol Cha Nilam Kendro) is the second tea auction center in Bangladesh, which is located in Sreemangal Upazila, Moulvibazar District. It was inaugurated by Abul Maal Abdul Muhith, the Finance Minister of Bangladesh on 8 December 2017.

== History ==
In 1849, by establishing the Malnicherra Tea Estate in Sylhet, British Hardson established the first tea garden in the subcontinent. There are 164 tea gardens in Bangladesh, among them 135 tea gardens are located in Greater Sylhet. Of which, 92 gardens are located only in Moulvibazar District. Moreover, there are 20 tea gardens in Sylhet district and 22 in Habiganj district. But the tea produced in the gardens of Greater Sylhet was to be sent to Chittagong Tea Auction. As a result, it was a long desired to establish a tea auction centre in this region. In this context, Prime Minister Sheikh Hasina informed that the second tea auction centre will be constructed in Srimangal, the tea capital of Bangladesh.

== Auction list ==
Out of the four districts of Sylhet Division (Moulvibazar, Habiganj and Sylhet), three are tea producing districts. According to the Annual Tea Production Index of the year 2016, 60,000 metric tonnes out of the total tea production of 70,000 MT, was produced in the Greater Sylhet. Only 75 per cent of the tea produced in Sylhet came from the gardens of Moulvibazar.

== See also ==
- Tea processing
- Economy of Sylhet
- Tea production in Bangladesh
