= Tea production in Kenya =

Tea is a major cash crop that is grown in Kenya. Kenyan tea has been the leading major foreign exchange earner for the country.

Most tea produced in Kenya is black tea, with green tea, yellow tea, white tea, and purple tea (a product whose leaves are naturally so colored by inherent anthocyanins) produced on order by major tea producers.

== History ==
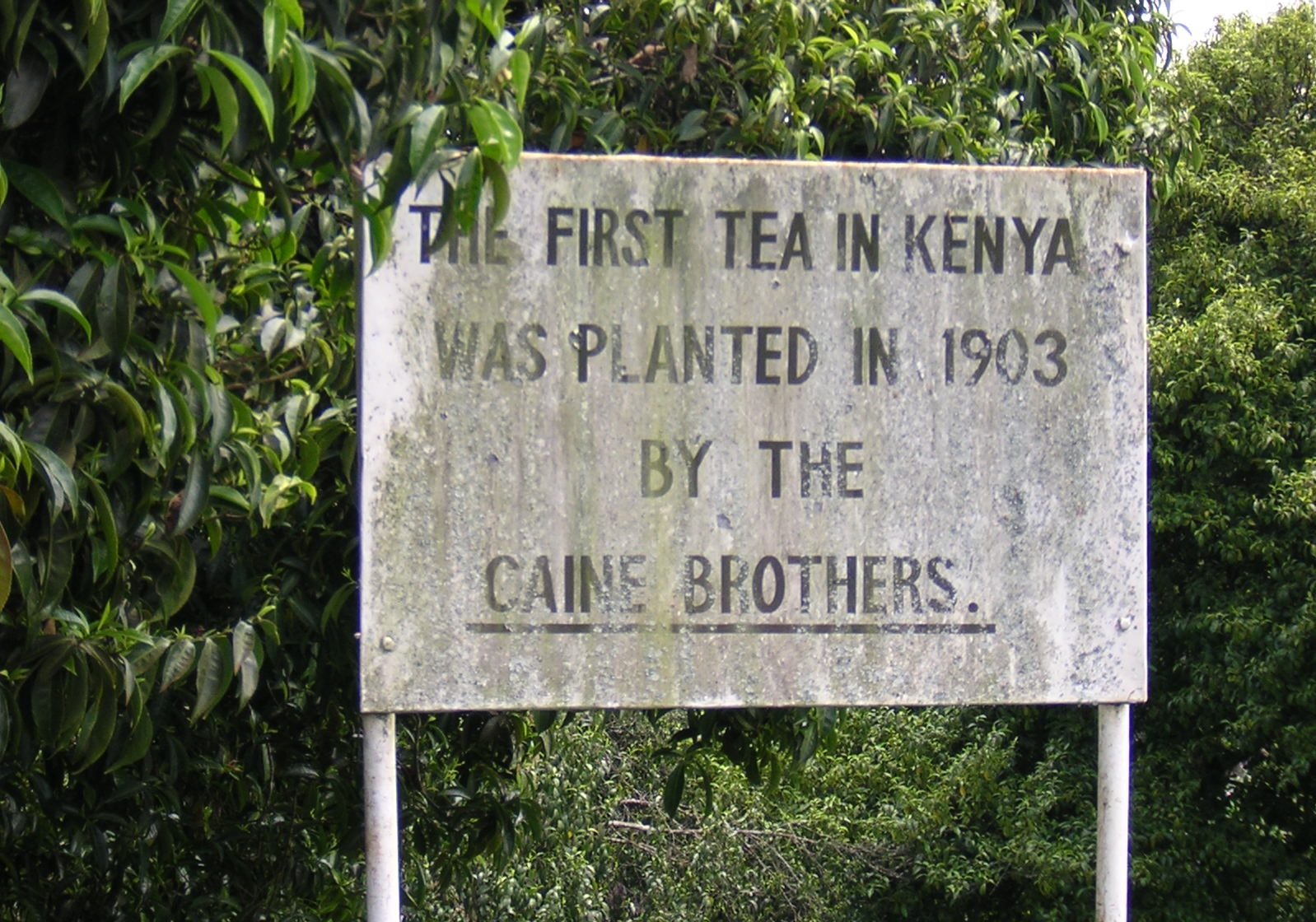
Sign board

Tea was first introduced in Kenya in 1903 by GWL Caine and was planted in present-day Limuru. Commercialisation of tea started in 1924 by Malcolm Fyers Bell, who was sent out by Brooke Bonds to start the first commercial estates. Since then the nation has become a major producer of black tea. Currently Kenya is ranked third after China and India in tea exports in the world. Kenyan tea is also one of the top foreign exchange earners, alongside tourism, horticulture, and Kenyan coffee.

The task of managing the small-scale holder lies with the Kenya Tea Development Agency (KTDA). Currently the KTDA has 66 tea factories serving over 500,000 small-scale farmers cultivating over 100,000 ha. Of all tea produced in Kenya, KTDA members produce over 60% while the rest is produced by large-scale producers.

== Labour ==
In most tea growing regions labour is manual. Tea plucking machines are currently being used by multinationals.

Tea production has been reported to make use of child labour according to the U.S. Department of Labor's report on the worst forms of child labour in 2013 and more recently according to the Department's List of Goods Produced by Child Labor or Forced Labor.

== Cultivation ==
Kenya's tea growing regions are endowed with ideal climate; tropical, volcanic red soils; well distributed rainfall ranging between 1200 mm to 1400mm per annum; long sunny days are some of the climatic features of the tea growing regions. The majority of Kenya's tea-growing regions are found in the Kenyan Highlands, on both sides of the Great Rift Valley. One . Tea is planted in an area of over 157,720 hectares, with production of about 345,817 metric tonnes made of tea. Over 325,533 metric tonnes exported. Cultivation is split between two types of system – small rural farms, called smallholdings (or shambas) and large company-run plantations. Vegetative propagation of high-yielding, well-adapted clones. Over 49 varieties so far developed by the Tea Research Foundation of Kenya (TRFK). Fertilizers are regularly added to replenish soil nutrients.

== Processing ==
Much of the tea grown in Kenya is processed using the crush, tear, curl method, making it suitable for use in blends popular in most black-tea markets, including India, Britain and North America. CTC tea has a homogeneous taste and a strong generic, bold "tea" flavor and is the base of most Indian tea blends as well as a significant portion of breakfast teas.

Higher-quality Kenyan teas are processed using traditional methods (e.g. picking of the tender leaves and bud cyclically, these being allowed to dry and oxidize), and are often highly sought after "single origin" whole-leaf teas. Multinational companies increasingly use automation to pluck the green leaves (4 kilos of green leaves produce 1 kilo of "made tea"), though smaller plantation estates may still pluck by hand. Kenyan teas are regularly sold in bulk to large blending houses to be added to black breakfast tea blends.

== Product ==
When processing the tea is graded into different grades. the major grades are:

Leaves and granules

- BP1: Broken Pekoe 1 forms about 12–14% of the total production. It has the largest size. The liquors are a bit light in body but with encouraging flavouring characteristics
- PF1: Pekoe Fanning 1. This is about 58–60% and forms the bulk of the production. It is mahas traces of black tea and large amount of smallish cut fibres often sifted out of the primary grades. F1 forms about 3–4% of the production and quite useful in tea bags due to its quick brewing, strong flavour and good colour.

Fine particles

- PD: Pekoe Dust. It forms 10–12% of the production, often black and finer than the PF1 often with thick liquors and aroma.
- Dust: Made up of tiny bits of broken leaf often used to brew strong tea quickly and popular for the tea bags.
- Dust1: This is made up of the smallest particles and form about 4–6% of the total production.

== Production ==
Production statistics in 2013:

| Item | Value | unit |
|---|---|---|
| Production | 432,400 | tonnes |
| Import | 12,934 | tonnes |
| Export | 451,028 | tonnes |
| Stock Variation | 85,000 | tonnes |
| Domestic supply | 79,306 | tonnes |
| Area harvested | 198,600 | hectare |

Domestic supply = Production + Import – Export + Stock Variation

In 2018, Kenya was the world's largest exporter and producer of black tea, with a total export value of US$1,355,994,000 in packings over 3 kilograms.

== International prices ==
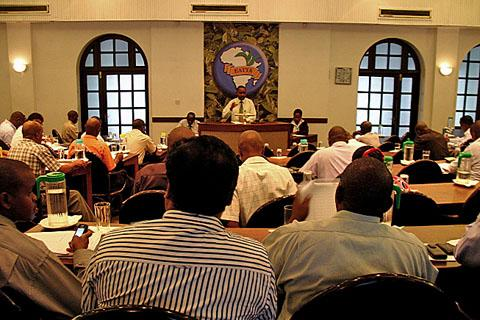
Inside the auction house, where etiquette is strict, with ties required for brokers and collared shirts for buyers

Tea from Kenya and other African countries is sold through a public auction in Mombasa. As of September 2023, the auction price of tea in Kenya stabilized at 2.25 U.S. dollars per kilogram.

== Institution and research ==
Tea in Kenya is controlled by different institutes and government bodies. They are:

- Ministry of Agriculture, Livestock and Fisheries: bear responsibility to the government
- Agriculture Fisheries and Food Authority -Tea Directorate: to manage tea industry in Kenya on behalf of the Government
- Kenya Tea Development Agency (KTDA): To manage small-scale trades
- East Africa Tea Trade Association (EATTA): to facilitate tea trade in East Africa and southern Africa.
- Tea Research Foundation of Kenya (TRFK): to facilitate tea research in Kenya

In 2011 the TBK and Egerton University entered into a partnership to strengthen tea industry in Kenya. They drafted a curriculum, that will offer undergraduate, post graduate, certificates and diplomas in tea production & marketing and tea processing technology & management.

== See also ==
- Agriculture in Kenya
- Coffee Industry of Kenya
- Economy of Kenya
- Tea production in Azerbaijan
- Tea production in Bangladesh
- Tea production in Indonesia
- Tea production in Nepal
- Tea production in Sri Lanka
- Tea production in Sylhet
- Tea production in Uganda
- Tea production in the United States
