= Lovan =

Lovan may refer to:

- a trade name of fluoxetine, a pharmaceutical drug
- Lövəyin, Azerbaijan
