= Tea production in Sri Lanka =

Production of tea in Sri Lanka

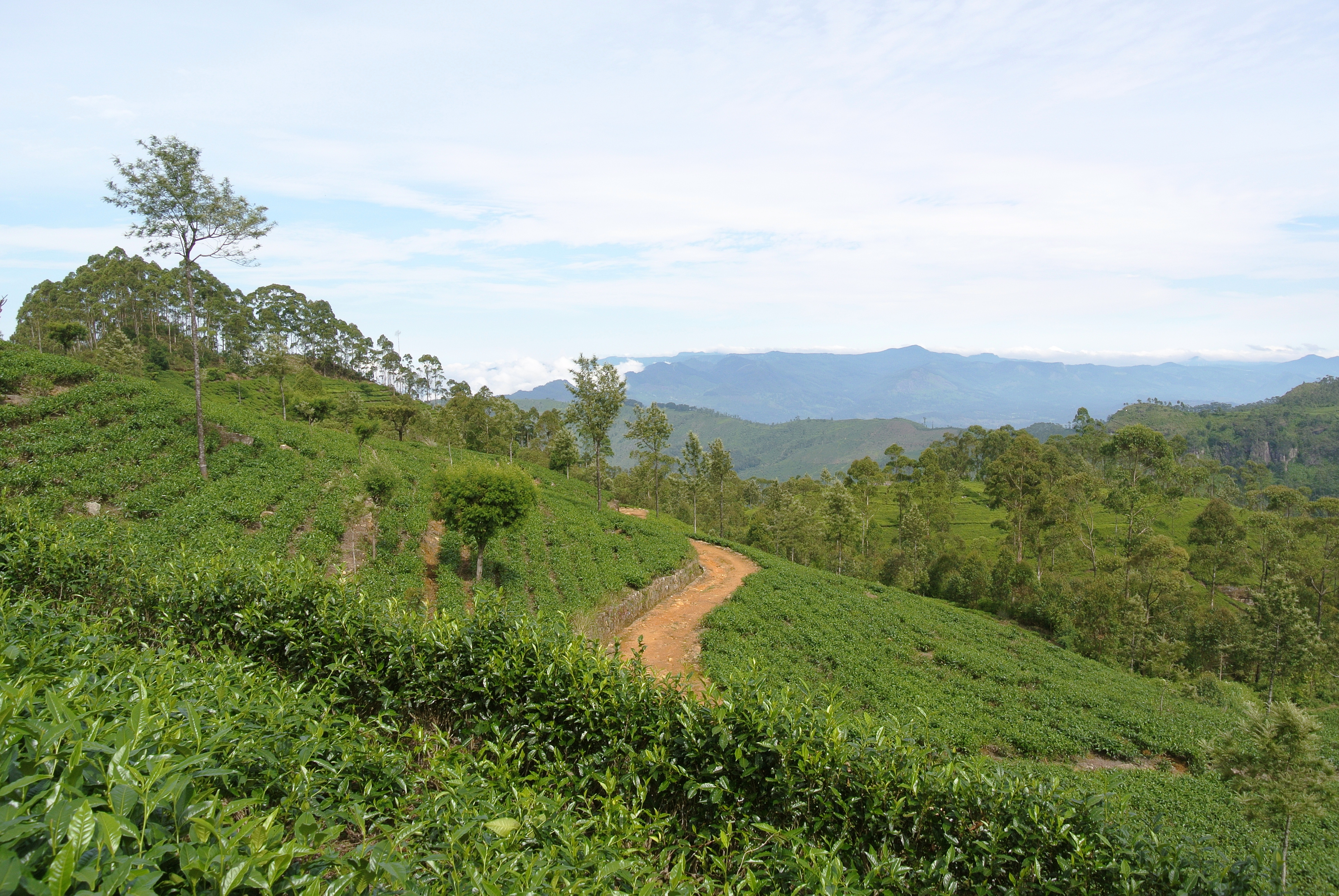
Tea plantation (Dambatenne estates) at about 1800 m above sea level in Haputale, Hill Country

Sri Lanka (formerly known as Ceylon) has a climate and varied elevations that enable the cultivation of both Camellia sinensis var. assamica and Camellia sinensis var. sinensis, with the assamica varietal accounting for the majority of production. Tea production is one of the main sources of foreign exchange for Sri Lanka, and accounts for 2% of GDP, contributing over US$1.3 billion in 2021 to the economy of Sri Lanka. It employs, directly or indirectly, over 1 million people, and in 1995 directly employed 215,338 on tea plantations and estates. In addition, tea planting by smallholders employs thousands and is the primary livelihood for tens of thousands of families. Sri Lanka is the world's fourth-largest producer of tea. In 1995, it was the world's leading exporter of tea (rather than a producer), accounting for 23% of global exports. Sri Lanka ranked second in tea export earnings in 2020 after China. The highest production of 340 million kg was recorded in 2013, while the production in 2014 was slightly reduced to 338 million kg. India has additionally guaranteed Sri Lanka a shipment of 65,000 metric tons of urea. Sri Lanka's troubled execution of an organic agriculture initiative had pushed the country perilously close to an agricultural crisis. Given the surge in global fertilizer prices, it is improbable that Sri Lanka could procure fertilizer at prevailing market rates.

James Taylor, circa 1870, the pioneer of the tea industry in Ceylon.

The humidity, cool temperatures, and rainfall in the country's central highlands create a climate conducive to the production of high-quality tea. On the other hand, tea produced in low-elevation areas such as the Matara, Galle, and Ratnapura districts, with high rainfall and warm temperatures, exhibits high astringency. Tea biomass production is higher in low-elevation areas. Such tea is popular in the Middle East. Sri Lanka produces primarily orthodox black teas, as well as CTC, white, and green teas. The two types of green tea produced are gunpowder and sencha. Tea planting was introduced to the country in 1867 by James Taylor, a British planter who arrived in 1852. The industry grew rapidly following the devastation of the coffee plantations in Ceylon in 1869 by a fungal disease called Hemileia vastatrix, also known as coffee leaf rust. Tea planting under smallholder conditions became popular in the 1970s. Most of Sri Lanka's export market is in the Middle East and Europe, but there are also plenty of bidders worldwide for its specialty high-country-grown Nuwara Eliya teas.

== History ==
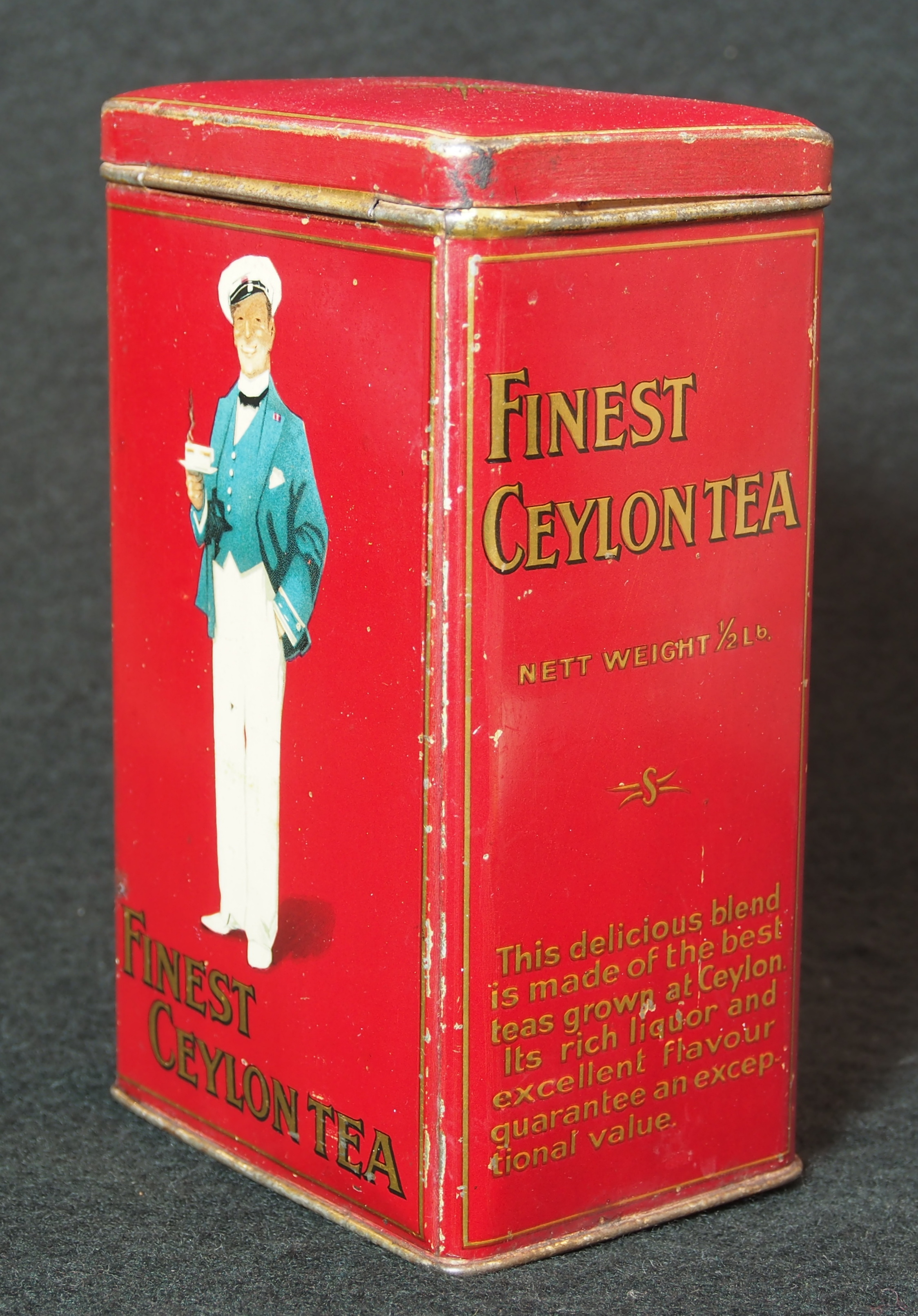
Old Ceylon tea tin

The total population of Sri Lanka, according to the 1871 census, was 2,584,780. The 1871 demographic distribution and population in the plantation areas are given below:

Kandy District, the heartland of tea production in Sri Lanka

1871 demographic distribution
District	Total population	No. of estates	Estate population	% of population on estates
Kandy District	258,432	625	81,476	31.53
Badulla District	129,000	130	15,555	12.06
Matale District	71,724	111	13,052	18.2
Kegalle District	105,287	40	3,790	3.6
Sabaragamuwa	92,277	37	3,227	3.5
Nuwara Eliya District	36,184	21	308	0.85
Kurunegala District	207,885	21	2,393	1.15
Matara District	143,379	11	1,072	0.75

=== Growth and history of commercial production ===
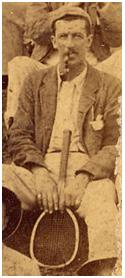
Henry Randolph Trafford, one of the pioneers of tea cultivation in Ceylon in the 1880s.

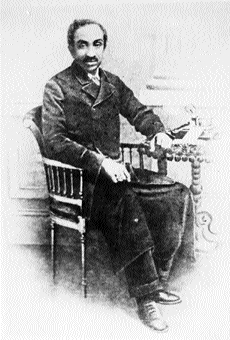
Whilst the pioneers of the industry were largely European, there were notable exceptions like Charles Henry de Soysa.

==== Registered tea production by elevation ====
Registered tea production in hectares and total square miles by elevation category in Sri Lanka, 1959–2000:

Year	High altitude hectares	Medium altitude hectares	Low altitude hectares	Total hectares	Total square miles
1959	74,581	66,711	46,101	187,393	723.5
1960	79,586	69,482	48,113	197,181	761.3
1965	87,345	92,806	60,365	240,516	928.6
1970	77,549	98,624	65,625	241,798	933.6
1975	79,337	98,446	64,099	241,882	933.9
1980	78,786	96,950	68,969	244,705	944.8
1985	74,706	89,175	67,769	231,650	894.4
1990	73,138	83,223	65,397	221,758	856.2
1995	51,443	56,155	79,711	187,309	723.2
2000	52,272	56,863	79,836	188,971	729.6

=== Export Destinations ===
Export destinations of Sri Lankan tea
Country	August 2026	December 2025	August 2025	December 2024
Turkiye	30,429	21,278	12,494	17,734
Iraq	16,428	39,362	26,009	34,260
Russia	15,399	21,593	14,772	24,987
Azerbaijan	8,174	8,916	5,963	10,435
China	6,504	10,425	6,831	11,564
Libya	6,231	18,930	14,399	10,291
Jordan	5,815		3,745	
Syria	5,604		5,495	
Saudi Arabia	5,533	8,733	5,850	9,138
Chile	5,499	11,096	7,715	8,638
UAE		18,323		21,132
Iran	10,390			10,432

== Branding ==
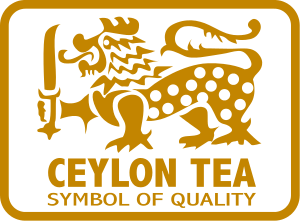
The Lion Logo of Ceylon tea

The Sri Lanka Tea Board is the legal proprietor of the lion logo of Ceylon tea. The logo has been registered as a trademark in many countries. To appear the Lion logo on a tea pack, it must meet four criteria.

1. The Lion Logo can only be used on consumer packs of Ceylon tea.
2. The packs must contain 100 percent pure Ceylon tea.
3. The packaging should be done only in Sri Lanka.
4. The brands which employ the Lion logo should meet the quality standards set by the Sri Lanka Tea Board.

The logo is widely regarded as a "known sign of high quality" worldwide. The Sri Lanka Tea board signed an agreement to sponsor Sri Lanka national cricket team and Sri Lanka women's national cricket team in their overseas tours for US$4 million for three years.

== Research ==
=== The Tea Research Institute ===
The Tea Research Ordinance was enacted by Parliament in 1925, and the Tea Research Institute (TRI) was founded. It is at present the only national body in the country that generates and disseminates new research and technology related to the processing and cultivation of tea.

Beginning in the early 1970s, two researchers from the National Institute of Dental Research in Bethesda, Maryland, USA conducted a series of research projects in which they arranged a longitudinal study group of a large number of Tamil tea labourers who worked at the Dunsinane and Harrow Tea Estates, 80 kilometres (50 mi) from Kandy. This landmark study was possible because the population of tea labourers was known to have never employed conventional oral hygiene measures, thereby providing insight into the natural history of periodontal disease in humans.

== Sustainability standards and certifications ==
Several organisations, both international and local, promote and enforce sustainability standards and certifications for tea in Sri Lanka.

Among the international organisations operating in Sri Lanka are Rainforest Alliance, Fairtrade, UTZ Certified, and Ethical Tea Partnership. The Small Organic Farmers' Association (SOFA) is a local organisation dedicated to organic farming.

== Gallery ==
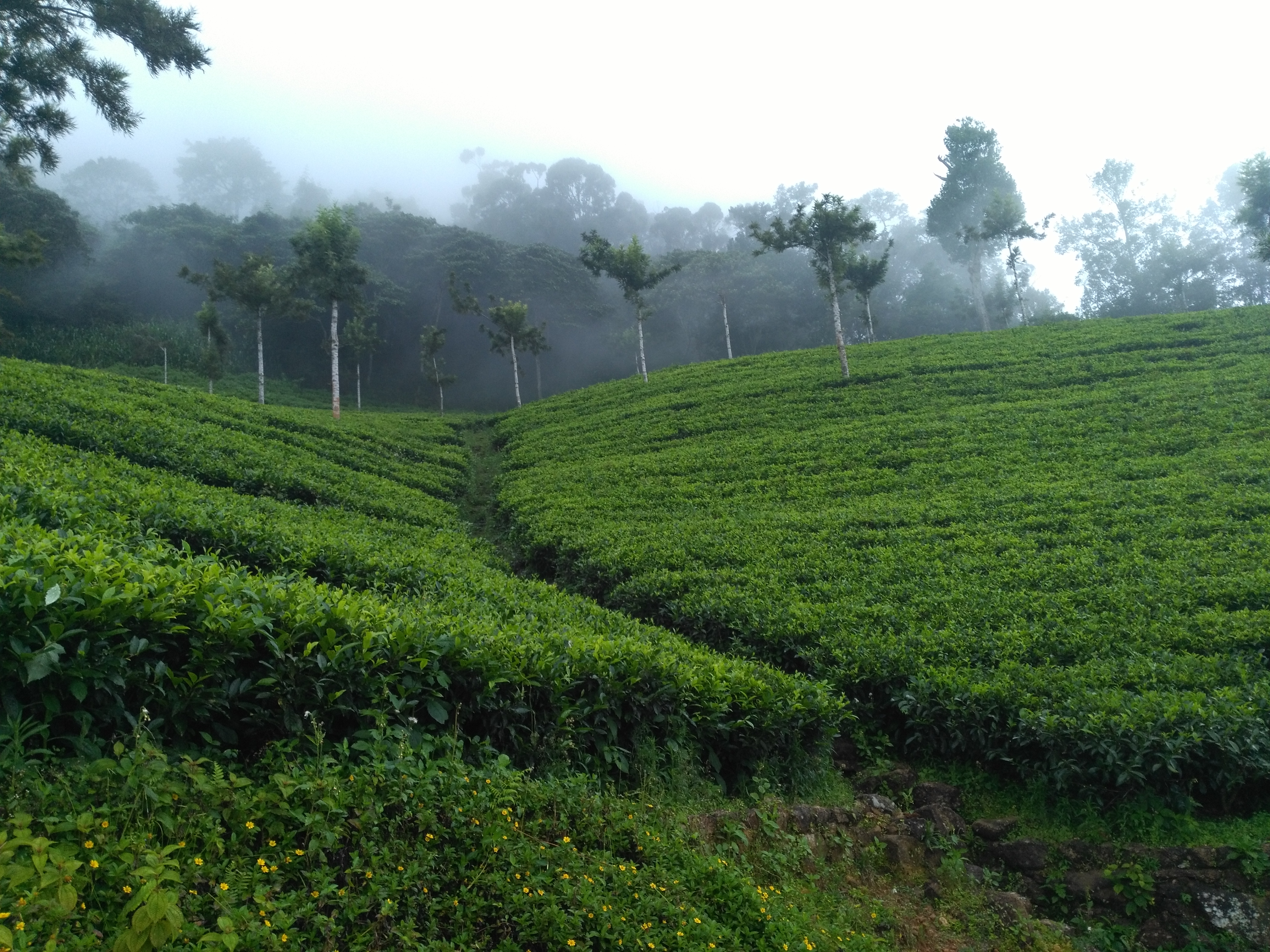
Tea plantations in Wewalthalawa

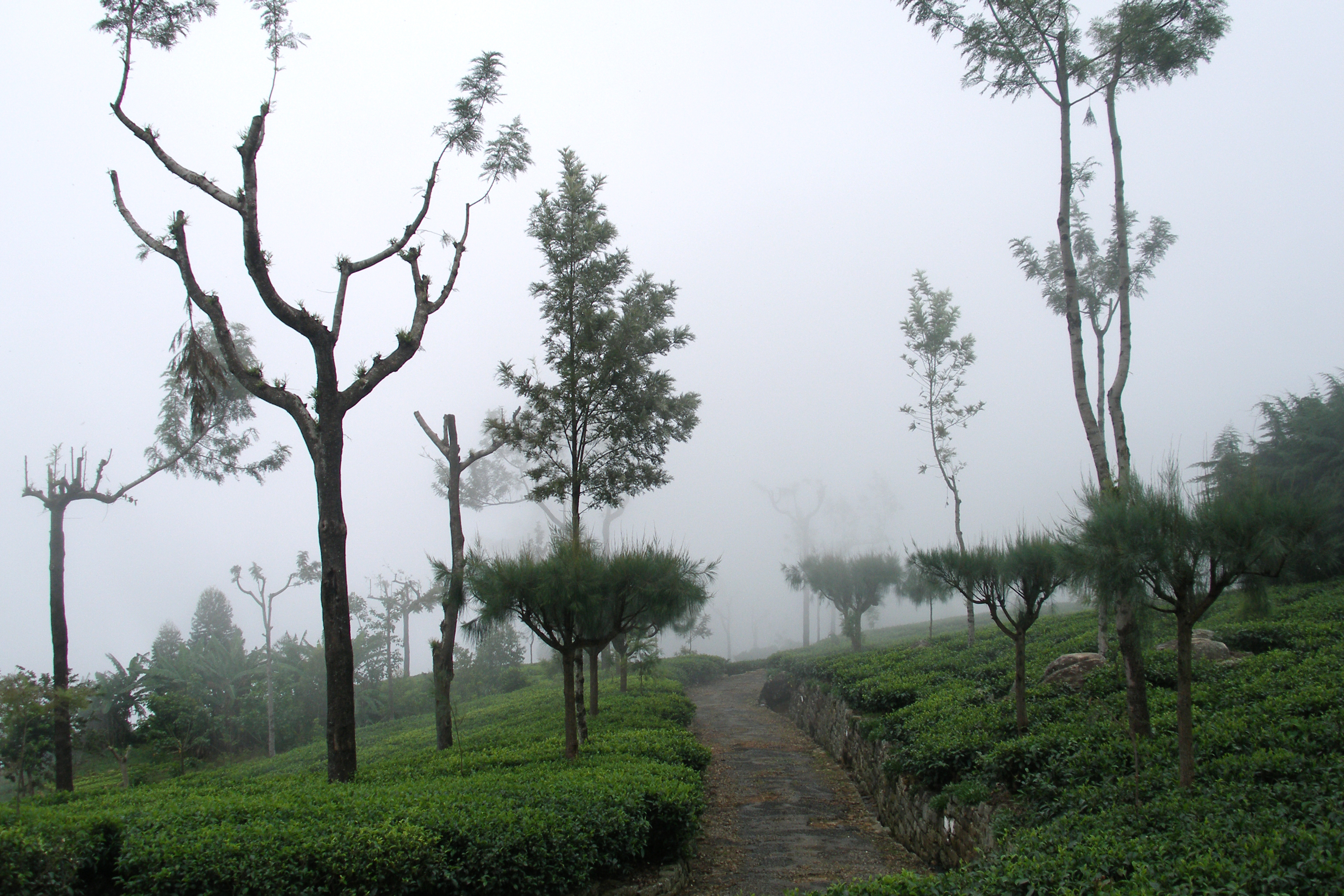
Tea plantations near Haputale, Uva

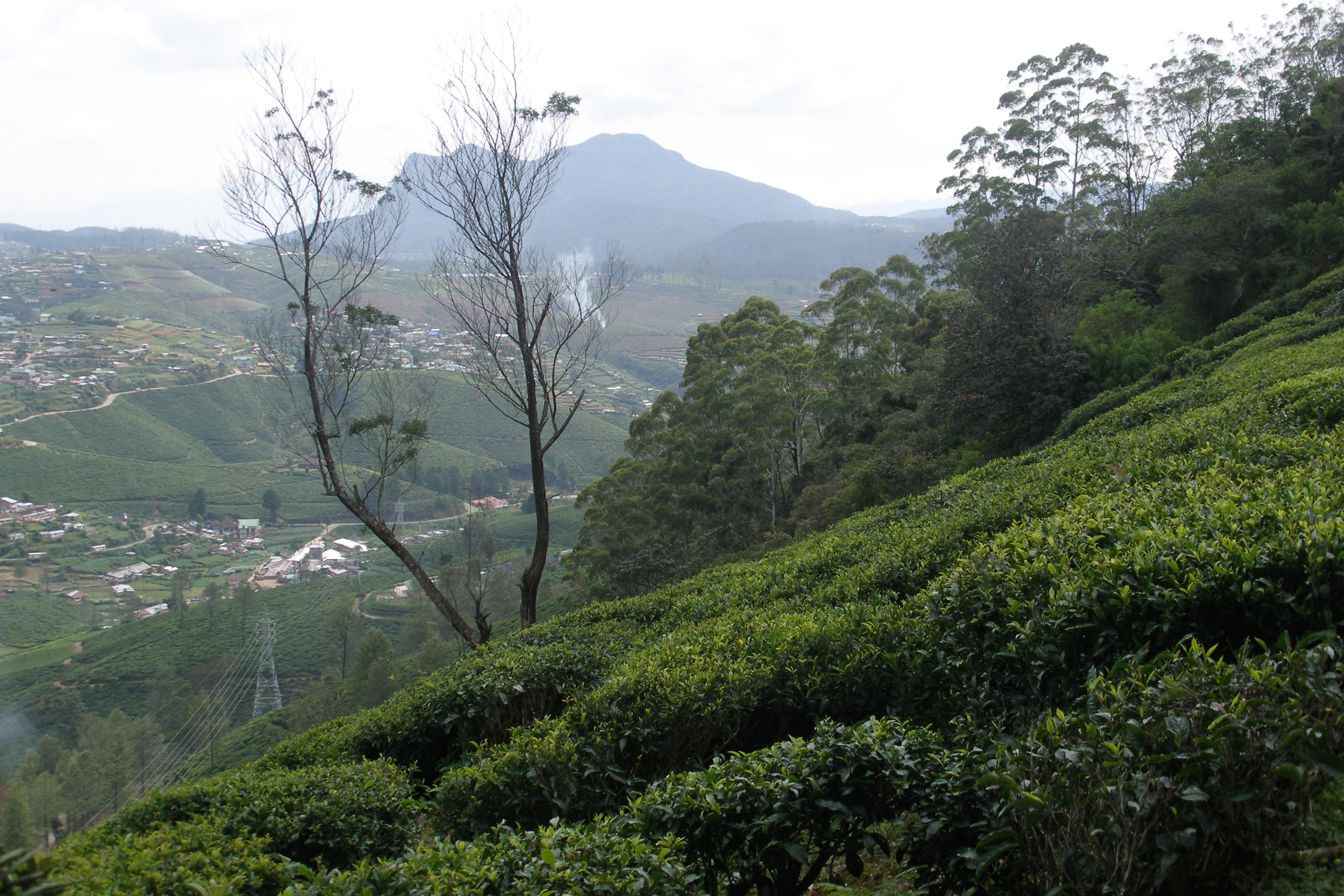
Tea plantations in Nuwara Eliya

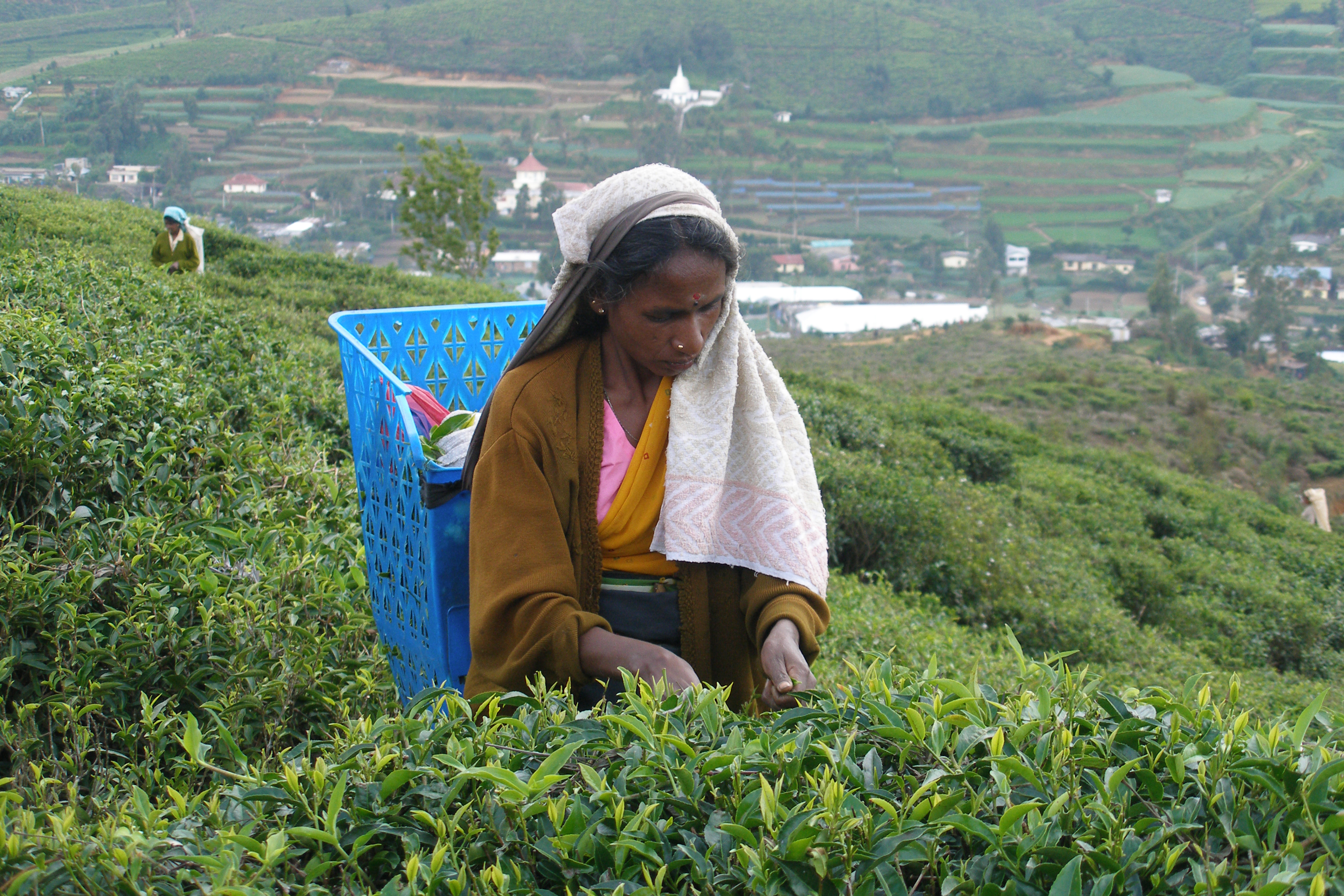
Picking tea leaves

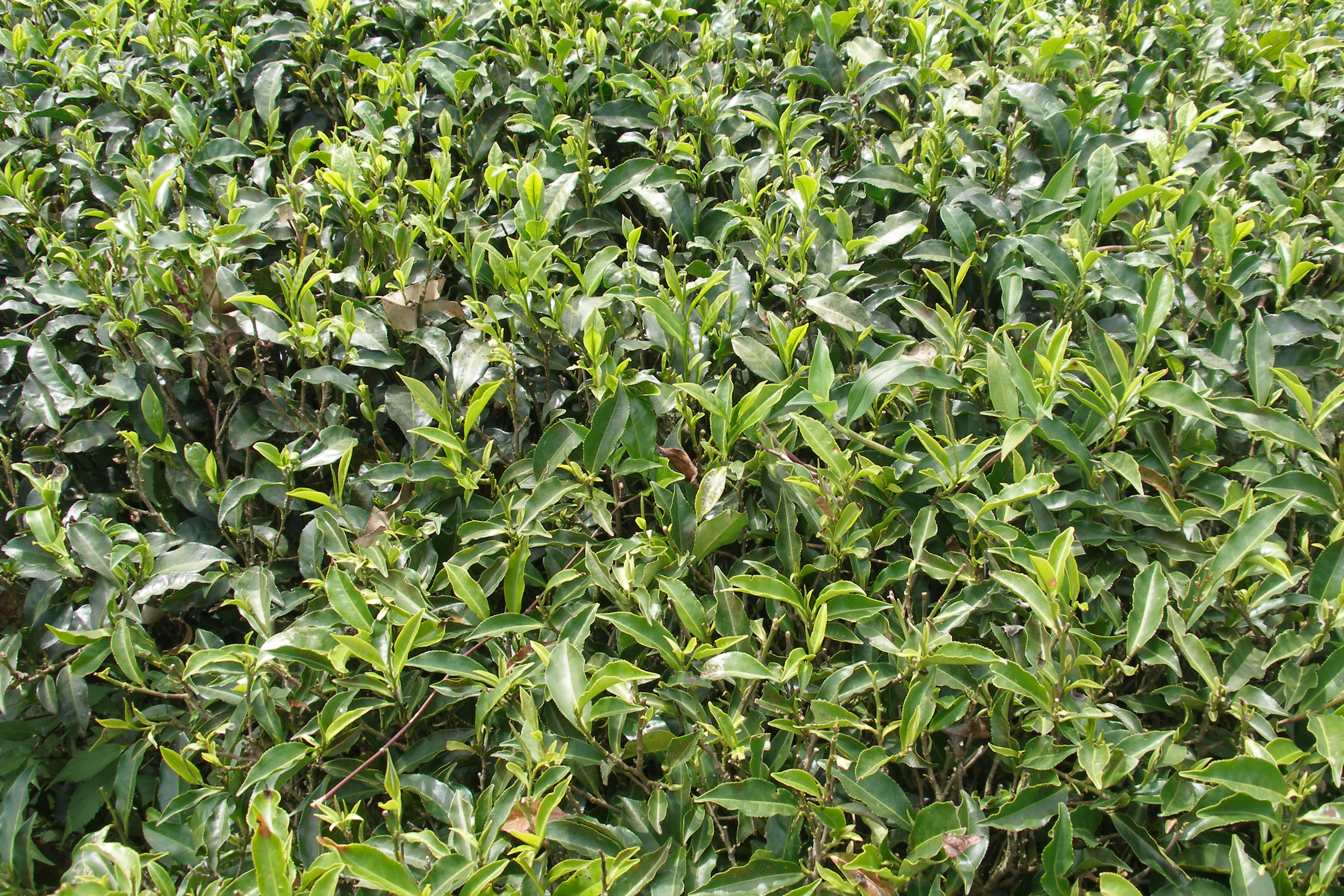
Tea leaves

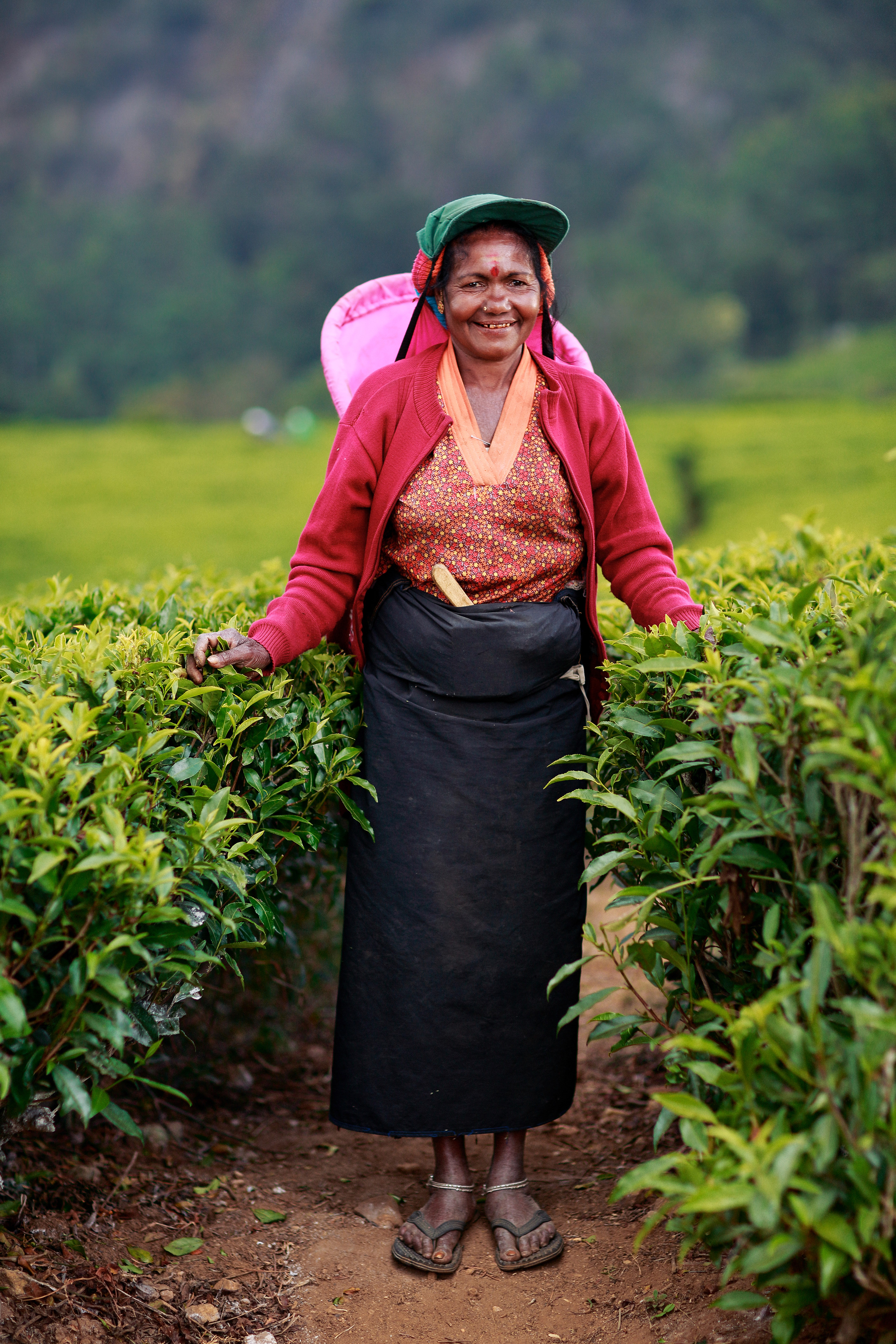
Tea harvester in Sri Lanka

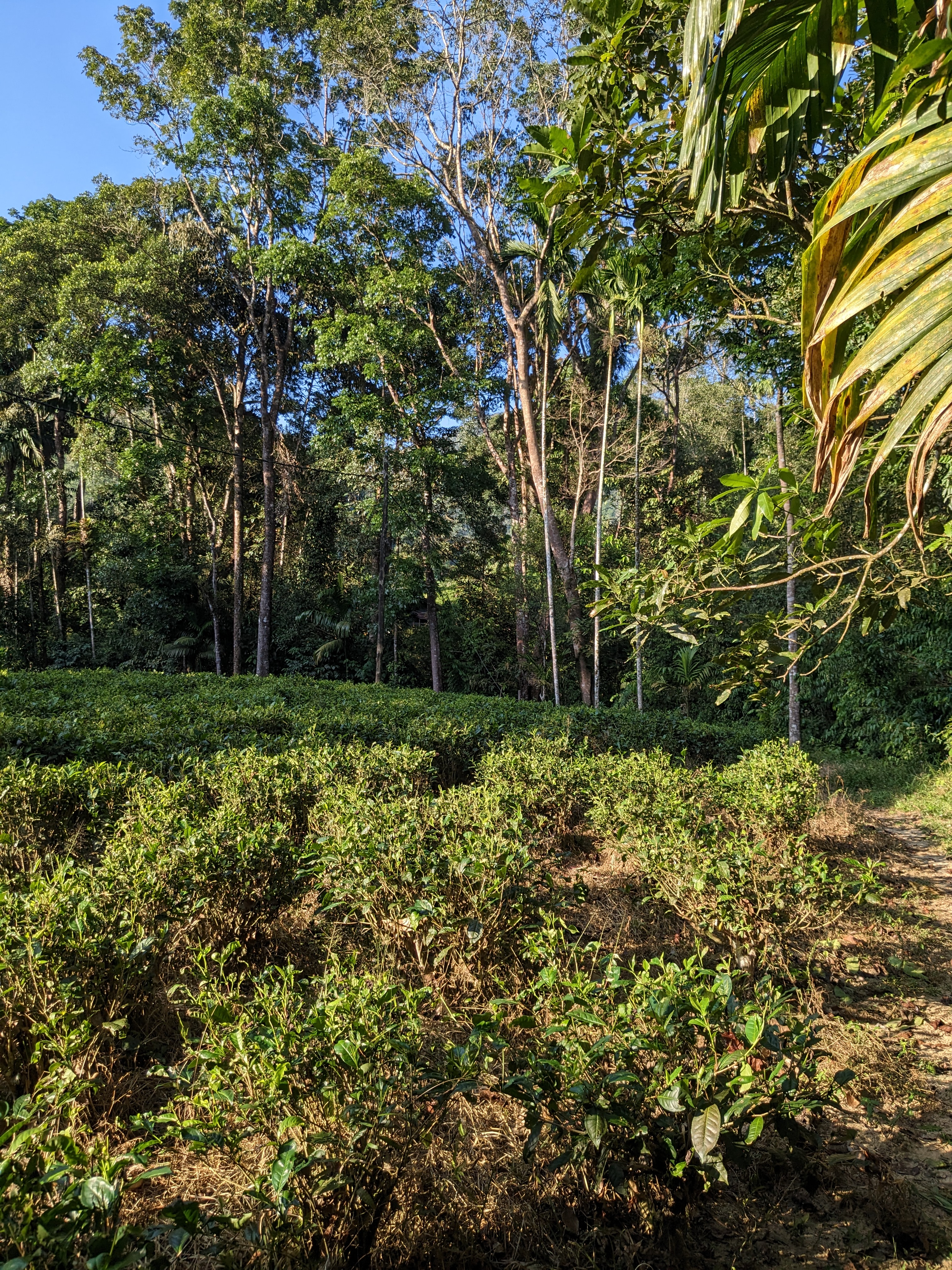
Tea grown in home-gardens by individual households - Ratnapura Dist

== See also ==
- Akbar Tea
- Dilmah
- George Steuart Group (Steuarts Tea, 1835 Steuarts Ceylon)
- Heladiv
- Island Tea
- Loolecondera
- Mlesna
- Thomas Lipton
- Tea production in Azerbaijan
- Tea production in Bangladesh
- Tea production in Indonesia
- Tea production in Nepal
- Tea production in Kenya
- Tea production in Uganda
- Tea production in the United States
