= Island Tea =

Sri Lankan tea brand

Island Tea Co.
- Founded: 2017; 9 years ago
- Founder: Minodh de Silva
- Headquarters: Metro Cebu, Philippines
- Area served: Middle East, South Asia, Asia Pacific
- Key people: Minodh de Silva (Group Director and Global Chief Business Officer); Aileen Arellano (President)
- Products: Ceylon Tea, Ceylon milk tea, Fruit-infused tea
- Number of employees: 400
- Website: islandtea.lk

Island Tea is a Sri Lankan brand of tea, sold internationally. The company was founded in 2017 by Minodh de Silva, it has manages and expands its network through separate companies located in Philippines, Sri Lanka, Qatar, Australia and Singapore, which are privately held.

The Island Tea chain is owned by Ceylanka Trading Incorporated (CTI), headquartered in Philippines since 2017. The franchise modeling of the brand was introduced by Francorp Philippines, a franchise consulting firm in Philippines in April 2018. Island Tea has been a member of the Philippine Franchise Association since 2019.

== History ==
Island Tea was founded in Colombo, Sri Lanka in 2017 by Minodh de Silva, a Sri Lankan entrepreneur, business professional, and award-winning marketer. In a marketing career spanning over 19 years, De Silva also featured on ‘People Asia’ & CIM (UK) amongst a host of other business talk shows and magazines. In 2017, he ventured to expand the retail concept outside Sri Lanka and started the first branch in December 2017 in Metro Cebu, Philippines.

=== Expansion ===
The company expanded its operations in June 2018 out of the Philippines. Currently, Island Tea is the only chain of ‘Pure Ceylon’ value-added tea cafes in the South East Asian territories particularly based in the Philippines. As of 2021, the company has multiple branches across Philippines in Luzon, Visayas and Mindanao in key cities of Manila, Batangas, Pampanga, Tarlac, Tagaytay, Baguio, Cebu City, Talisay, Minglanilia, Badian, Tabuelan, Bohol, Iloilo, Tacloban, Leyte, Bacolod, Zamboanga, General Santos, Abra and Ilocos.

The first branch of Island Tea in Sri Lanka opened in Ella, Sri Lanka in 2019. The first branch in Middle East was opened in Dubai, UAE in 2020, this was followed by Qatar and Australia in 2021. As of June 2021 the company operates over 50+ branches across Philippines, Sri Lanka, UAE, Qatar and Australia with more planned expansions across Asia Pacific and Middle East. The brands branch network continues to expand steadily in the largest malls and commercial establishments of the countries it operates in.

Island Tea Co. operates its network through several companies established in Sri Lanka (Island Tea Co. Holdings Limited), Philippines (Ceylanka Trading Inc.), Qatar (Ceylanka Trading WLL.), Australia (Island Tea Co. Australia) and Singapore (Island Tea Co. Singapore PTE. LTD.); The company has planned to open multiple branches in Middle East in Qatar, Saudi Arabia, Bahrain, Dubai and Oman by end 2021. The brand is expected to open more branches in Australia in Canberra and Darwin, after opening in Perth, its first branch in Australia in 2021. The brand is expected to open in Singapore and India as well by 2021. Currently there are more than 50 locations of the brand in 05 countries.

During the period of COVID-19, Island Tea Co. became one of the first companies to engage in Corporate social responsibility (CSR) activities targeting medical frontlines in hospitals and vaccination centers in Philippines. The company distributed hundreds of Ceylon milk teas to hospitals and vaccination centers across the western regions of Philippines.

== Products ==
Island Tea Co. menu serves a wide range of beverages ranging from milk teas, cream cheese milk teas, green tea cream cheese, brown sugar milk teas, tea shakes, oreo cream cheese milk teas, creamy nutella milk teas, black teas, ice chocolate teas, bubble teas, coffee blended series with a host of other specialty hot teas to fruit teas & green teas. The ready to drink tea products are often served with a host of toppings such as black pearls and sinkers such as nata de coco, coffee jelly, caramel pudding and popping booba. The brand also sells take-home packs of loose leaf and tea bags under its own brand and affiliated brands.

All the tea products in the menu are exclusively manufactured for ITC by leading public quoted manufacturing companies such as HVA Lanka PLC., in Sri Lanka under ISO 2200 and HACCP international food safety standards. Island Tea Co. logistics are handled to international standards by UPS (United Parcel Services) on all its foreign distribution operations.
