= Teh botol =

Indonesian popular tea brand

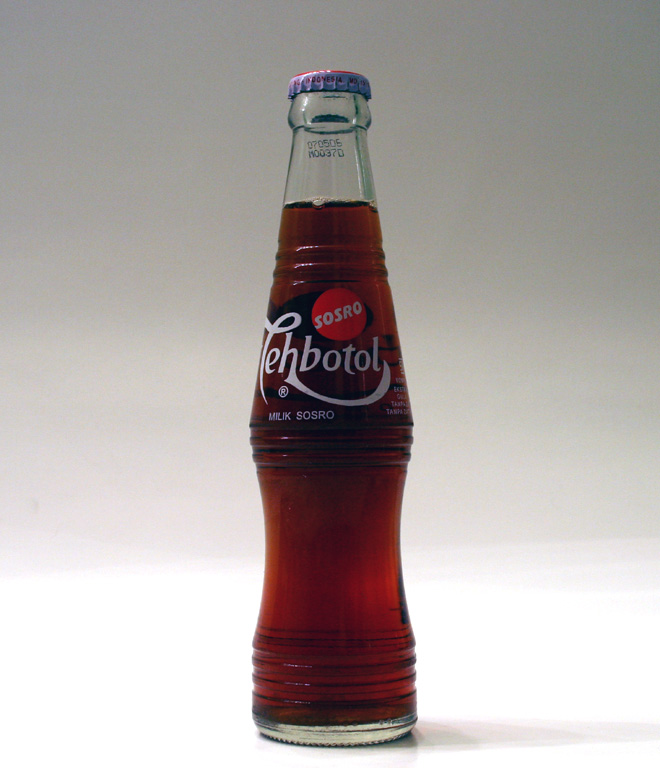
- Teh Botol Sosro bottle, design shown used since 1974
- Manufacturer: Sosro
- Origin: Indonesia
- Introduced: 1970; 56 years ago

Teh Botol ("bottled tea" in Indonesian) is an Indonesian jasmine tea drink produced by the company Sosro and sold worldwide. It is sweetened and usually served cold. In addition, Sosro also sells the tea in signature glass bottles as well as Tetra Pak and plastic bottle packaging.

== History ==
The Sosro brand, a well-known tea brand in Indonesia, is taken from the Sosrodjojo (aka Souw Seng Kiam) family name, the owners of the company. They started the business of marketing jasmine tea based in Slawi, a small town in Central Java province, in 1940. The first brand was called Teh Cap Botol ("bottle brand tea").

In 1965, the Cap Botol jasmine tea was first introduced to Jakarta by promoting the product with free samples under the marketing name of cicip rasa. During the free tasting promotion, the jasmine tea was brewed on the spot, but the time required for brewing was too long for some of their more impatient customers. To overcome this problem, the promotion staff brewed the tea in the office before going to the promotion location and poured the ready-to-consume jasmine tea into big pots and pans. However, this technique did not solve the problem; the tea in large pots and pans spilled over on the way before they reached the location. Another solution was found by placing the brewed jasmine tea in clean used glass bottles, which were normally used for packing soda, soy sauce and other products. It was successful and gave birth of the teh botol (or bottled tea) brand name in 1969. The official name was Teh Botol Sosro.

The first bottles were introduced in 1970. In 1972, they redesigned the bottles. In 1974, with the establishment of PT Sinar Sosro (a company producing the Teh Botol Sosro) in Ujung Menteng (part of Bekasi at that time) again redesigned the bottle which remains in use today.

== See also ==
- Camellia sinensis
- Indonesian cuisine
- List of Indonesian drinks
- Tea
