= Tea production in the United States =

Camellia sinensis, the source of tea leaves and buds, can be grown in much of the United States. Commercial cultivation has been tried at various times and locations since the 1700s, but tea has remained a niche crop and has never been cultivated widely in the US. As of 2020, the US mainland has one relatively large plantation with full mechanization in Charleston, South Carolina, and many small commercial tea gardens that pick tea by hand. Some growers feel that tea production is not economically viable without some mechanization, but there is evidence that unmechanized tea production is viable, albeit with lower net profit margins.

The Charleston Tea Garden, on Wadmalaw Island, outside of Charleston, South Carolina, is the only large-scale tea farm in the US, at 127 acres. Smaller scale commercial farms are in the states of Alabama, Hawaii, Oregon, South Carolina, and Washington.

Starting in the early 2010s, small-scale farms began selling tea to the general public, the largest of which being The Great Mississippi Tea Company, which grows seven acres of tea. Smaller farms selling their tea online include Light of Day Organics in Michigan, Table Rock Tea Company in South Carolina, Minto Island Tea Co. in Oregon, and Fleur De Lis Tea in Louisiana, among others.

== History ==
Commercial tea cultivation in the Americas was first attempted in 1744 in Colonial Georgia, when tea seeds were sent to the Trust Garden in Savannah. The first recorded successful cultivation of the tea plant in the colonies is recorded as growing on Skidaway Island near Savannah in 1772

In 1863, The New York Times reported the discovery of tea plants growing natively in Western Maryland and Pennsylvania, sparking an interest in cultivating the plants commercially. In 1880, the US Government hired John Jackson, an experienced tea planter in India, to cultivate tea plants planted 30 years earlier in Liberty County, Georgia. This proved unsuccessful.

The Wakamatsu Tea and Silk Farm Colony, believed to be the first permanent Japanese settlement in North America, briefly produced tea in California in the 1870s.

=== Hawaii ===
Tea was introduced in Hawaii in 1887 and was commercially grown until 1892. While it is not clear why the tea was eventually discontinued, historians believe higher wages compared to other prime tea growing areas in Asia and Africa were among the deciding factors. Lower production costs of tea's main rival, coffee, also helped prevent it from establishing a foothold.

In the 1960s, Lipton and A&B formed a joint venture to investigate the possibility of growing tea commercially in Hawaii. Both companies decided not to open gardens on the Island but rather to open gardens in Latin America.

=== South Carolina ===
Junius Smith succeeded in growing tea commercially in Greenville, South Carolina, from 1848 until his death in 1853. Dr. Alexis Forster oversaw the next short-lived attempt in Georgetown, South Carolina, from 1874 until his death in 1879.

In the 1870s, some 200 acres of land near Summerville, South Carolina, were leased for an experimental station, using seeds from China, India, and Japan. A change of commissioners in 1884 resulted in a report faulting the climate as unsuitable, and the Newington Plantation near Summerville was abandoned. Congress later appropriated $10,000 for a second experimental tea farm in the Summerville area, called the Pinehurst Plantation, located just one mile from the previously terminated effort, and received Patent Office permission to experiment with plants left at the older government station. Under the leadership of Dr. Charles Shepard, Newington Plantation became quite productive; an 1887 'New York Times' report credited annual production at 12,000 pounds. By 1893, the Pinehurst plants were sufficiently established for the first leaf plucking. Dr. Shepard secured laborers for the fields by opening a school and making tea-picking part of its curriculum, essentially ensuring a force of child labor while providing them with an education they might not otherwise obtain. Dr. Shepard's final report indicated the chief expense in the production of tea was the gathering of the leaf, which amounted to approximately 50% of labour costs, but this did not preclude the profitable production of the crop even when sold at prices as low as half the cost of imported leaf. However, domestic shipping rates made selling his tea to major markets in the US difficult. These "made it cheaper for Chicagoans, for example, to buy tea from China than from Carolina" Nevertheless, the Pinehurst produced award-winning teas until Dr. Shepard's death in 1915. The garden closed after Shepard's death and Pinehurst lay unattended until 1963.

In 1963, The Lipton Tea Company was worried about the instability of the third world countries that produce tea and paid to have the surviving tea plants at Pinehurst moved to a former potato farm on Wadmalaw Island. Lipton operated an experimental tea farm until it was sold in 1987 to Mack Fleming and Bill Hall, who converted the experimental farm into a working tea garden. The Charleston Tea Plantation utilized a converted tobacco harvester to mechanically harvest the tea. The Charleston Tea Plantation sold tea mail order known as American Classic Tea and also produced Sam's Choice Instant Tea, sold through Sam's Clubs. American Classic Tea has been the official tea of the White House since 1987. Losing money and nearly bankrupt, in 2003 the plantation was sold to Bigelow Tea Company at a court auction for $1.28 million and was temporarily closed for renovation in order to attract tourists and boost its revenues. The garden reopened in January 2006 and gives free tours to the public.

== Alabama ==
As part of the Lipton study in South Carolina, an out-station was established in Fairhope, Alabama as well as other select locations in the Southern US. The material in Fairhope was destroyed by a hurricane not long after its inception and was abandoned. However, the out-station supervisor rescued a few seeds and cuttings which were used to start a private plantation nearby now known as the Fairhope Tea Plantation, owned by Donnie Barratt, the son of the out-station supervisor. Tea is still produced at the plantation in small quantities, sold through a nearby gift shop.

== Recent production ==
In 2000 horticulturist Francis Zee found a strain of Camellia sinensis, the tea plant, that can flourish in the tropical climate and volcanic soil of Hawaii. A joint study of commercially growing tea in Hawaii was started by University of Hawaiʻi at Mānoa College of Tropical Agriculture and Human Resources and University of Hawaiʻi at Hilo College of Agriculture, Forestry and Natural Resource Management with the U.S. Department of Agriculture. With the decline of Hawaii's sugar industry, tea cultivation is seen as a possible replacement crop. Around 2003, Hawaii had an estimated 5 acres (20,000 m^{2}) of land producing tea but by 2005 that number jumped to roughly 80 acres (320,000 m^{2}).

Minto Island Growers near Salem, Oregon has begun to market small quantities of their own tea.

Table Rock Tea Company in Upstate South Carolina began cultivation in 2008 and is currently producing tea and offering tours to the public.

Fleur De Lis Tea Company (FDLTC) in Amite, Louisiana planted their first tea plants in 2017. Originally planted just as an experiment by founder David Barron, the plants survived. After 5 years, the original tea plants had matured and were in commercial production. By then, two additional fields had been planted. FDLTC produces and sells a black tea, 'Big Easy', which won 'Highly Commended' (2nd place) in the black tea category at the 2022 UK Tea Academy's Leafies Award.

Hobbyist growers have also started experimenting with growing tea in home gardens in areas like New Orleans, Louisiana.

== Tea Farms in development ==
A Burlington, Washington farm grew approximately 5 acres of tea from 2010 to 2016, but suspended production after labor disputes.

Finger Lakes Tea Company in upstate New York planted 55,000 tea plants in 2014, but most died during the 2015 winter season. A company in Mount Vernon, Texas started cultivating and selling tea in. An attempt by the same growers began in Coeur d'Alene, Idaho in 2015 and expanded in 2016 with Nepalese and Sochi seed-stock. Production attempts appear to have been suspended since late 2017.

== See also ==
- Tea production in Bangladesh
- Tea production in Kenya
- Tea production in Sri Lanka
