= Tea production in Bangladesh =

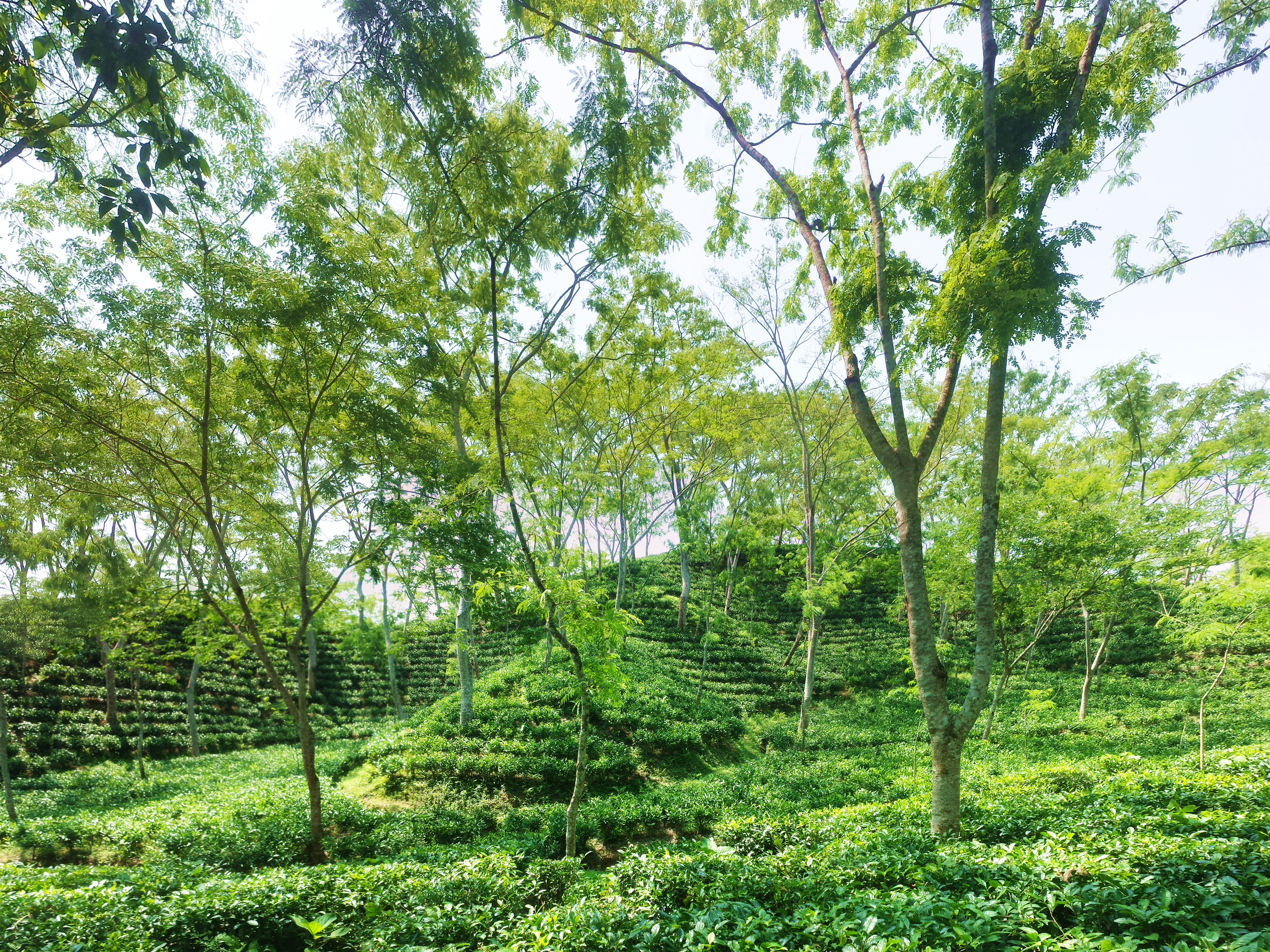
Tea garden in Sreemangal

Bangladesh is an important tea-producing country. It is the 9th largest tea producer in the world, producing a total of 97.08 million kgs in 2019. Its tea industry dates back to British rule, when the East India Company initiated the tea trade in the hills of the Sylhet region. In addition to that, tea cultivation was introduced to Greater Chittagong in 1840. Today, the country has 166 commercial tea estates, including many of the world's largest working plantations. The industry accounts for 3% of global tea production, and employs more than 4 million people.

The tea is grown in the northern and eastern districts of Bangladesh, such as in Sylhet, Panchagarh, Lalmonirhat, Thakurgaon, Dinajpur and Bandarban. The highlands, temperate climate, humidity and heavy rainfall within these districts provide a favourable ground for the production of high quality tea.

== History ==
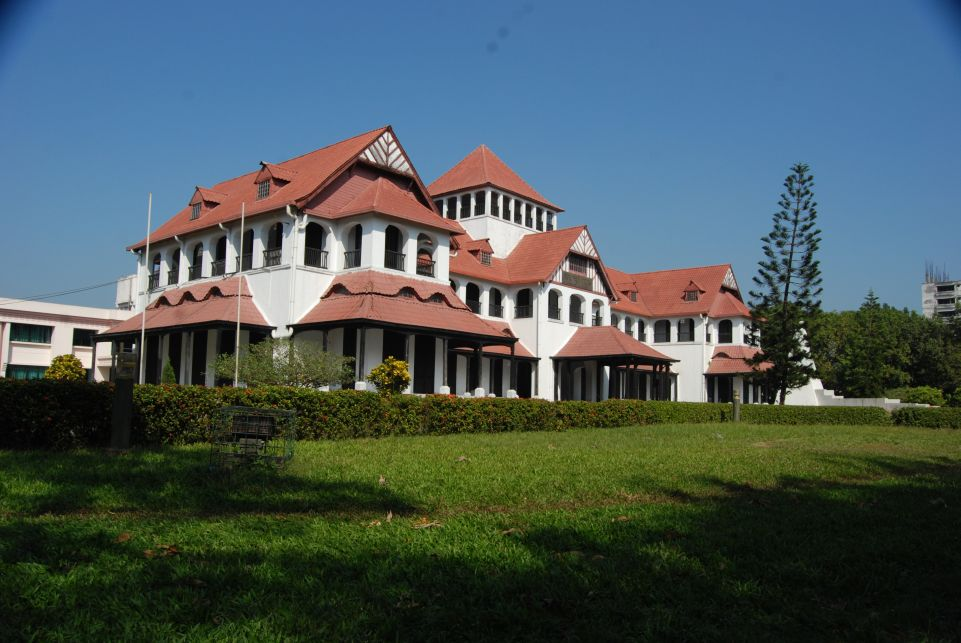
Sylhet is the birthplace of the Bangladesh tea industry.

Historically, Bengal was the terminus of the Tea Horse Road connecting the subcontinent with China's early tea-growing regions in Yunnan. Atisa is regarded as one of the earliest Bengali drinkers of tea.

Black tea cultivation was introduced in Bengal and Assam during the British Empire, particularly in Assam's Sylhet district. In 1834, Robert Bruce discovered tea plants in the Khasi and Jaintia Hills and other hilly areas in the northeast. This led to the Assam Tea Company being established in 1839 and many businessmen were actively involved with this company such as Haji Mohammed Hashim, Dwarkanath Tagore and Mutty Lall Seal. The company was associated with Calcutta's Bengal Tea Association. European traders established the first subcontinental tea gardens in the port city of Chittagong in 1840, when plantations were set up beside the Chittagong Club using Chinese tea plants from the Calcutta Botanical Garden. The first home-grown tea was made and tasted near the Karnaphuli River in Chittagong in 1843. Commercial cultivation of tea began in the Mulnicherra Estate in Sylhet in 1857. The Surma River Valley in the Sylhet region emerged as the centre of tea cultivation in Eastern Bengal. Plantations also flourished in Lower Tippera (modern Comilla) and Panchagarh which is in North Bengal. Panchagarh is the only third tea zone in Bangladesh and the most demanded teas are cultivated here.

Tea was a major export of British Bengal. The Assam Bengal Railway served as a lifeline for the industry, transporting tea from growers in the Surma and Brahmaputra Valleys to exporters in the Port of Chittagong.

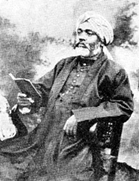
Syed Abdul Majid was a very notable pioneer in the native tea industry.

In the early twentieth century, many local entrepreneurs also started founding their own companies such as Syed Abdul Majid, Nawab Ali Amjad Khan, Muhammad Bakht Majumdar, Ghulam Rabbani, Syed Ali Akbar Khandakar, Abdur Rasheed Choudhury and Karim Bakhsh.

The Chittagong Tea Auction was established in 1949 by British and Australian traders. British companies such as James Finlay and Duncan Brothers once dominated the industry. The Ispahani family also became a highly prominent player in the industry.

== Industry ==
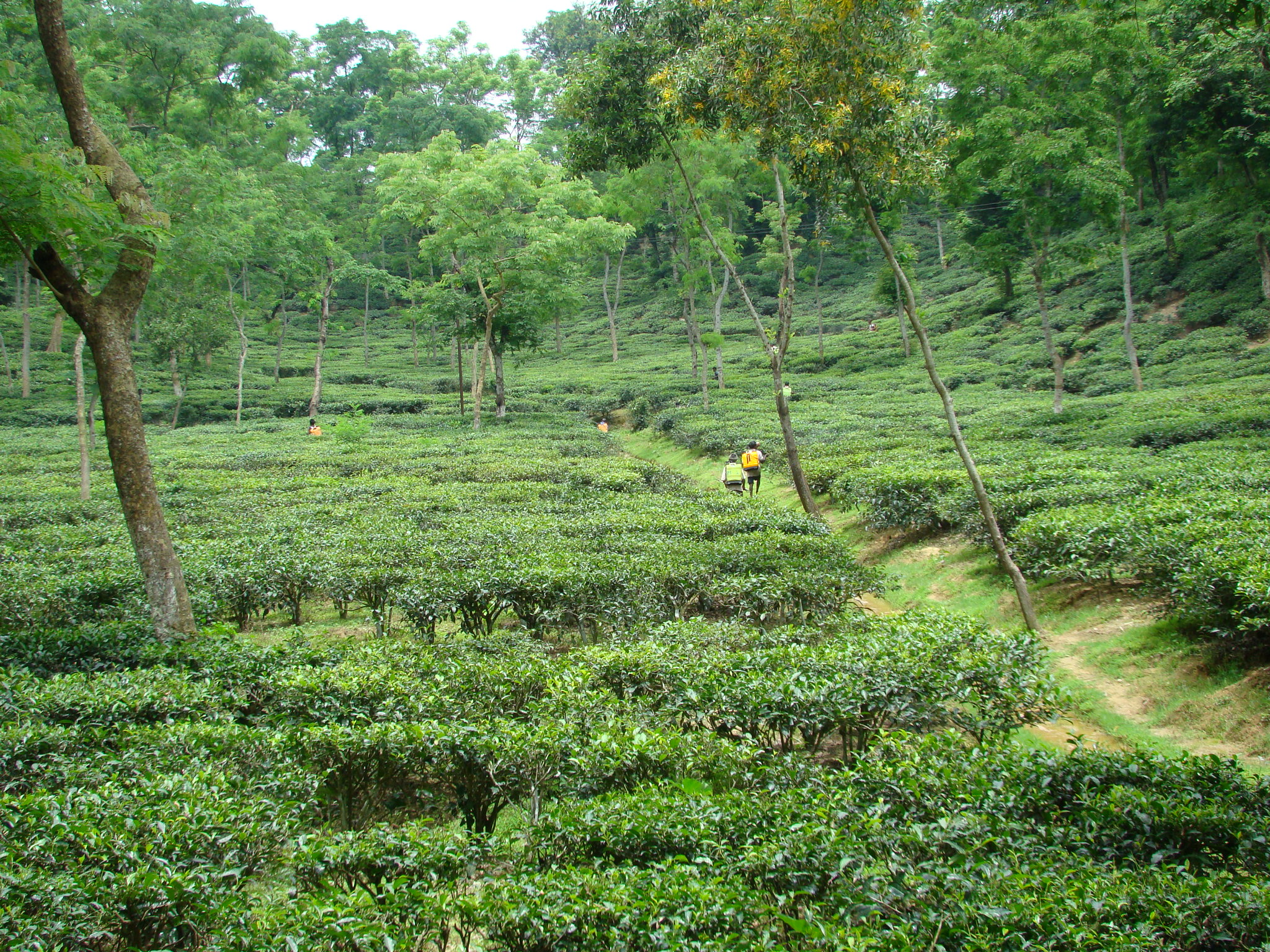
A tea garden in Sylhet district

Tea is the second largest export oriented cash crop of Bangladesh, following jute. The industry accounts for 1% of national GDP. Tea-producing districts include Moulvibazar, Habiganj, Sylhet, Chittagong, Panchagarh, Brahmanbaria, Rangamati, Naogaon.

Once a major world exporter, Bangladesh is now a net importer of tea. The rise of the Bangladeshi middle class has increasingly driven the industry to focus on a lucrative domestic market. The sector is today dominated by Bangladeshi conglomerates, including M. M. Ispahani Limited, Halda Valley, Kazi & Kazi, the Transcom Group, James Finlay Bangladesh, the Orion Group, the Abul Khair Group, the Meghna Group of Industries and Duncan Brothers Bangladesh Limited.

In 2012, Bangladesh recorded its highest production of tea, at 63.85 million kilograms. The country has over 56,846 hectares of land under tea cultivation, up from 28,734 hectares in 1947. The government has begun to promote small-scale tea growers, particularly in the Chittagong Hill Tracts.

The price of Bangladesh tea is determined at the public auction in Chittagong. In March 2015, the international price of Bangladesh tea was US$2.40.

Currently, the Moulvibazar District has the most tea plantations in the whole of the country.

== Labour ==
More than 300,000 plantation workers are employed in Bangladeshi tea gardens. 75% of workers are women. Many are descendants of tribal labourers brought from central India by the British. They are among the lowest paid in the country with a daily wage of 120 taka (about $1.25). On the first half of August 2022, the tea workers started a nationwide movement demanding an increase in daily wages from 120 taka to 300 taka. Former Prime Minister Sheikh Hasina ended the protest on 27 August by directing the tea estate owners to raise the daily wage of tea workers to ৳170. The labour ministry issued a gazette notification on August 12, 2023, setting the minimum wages for the labors to be 168 BDT, 169 BDT, and 170 BDT for the category C, B, and A tea gardens respectively with an annual raise of 5%.

== Government bodies ==
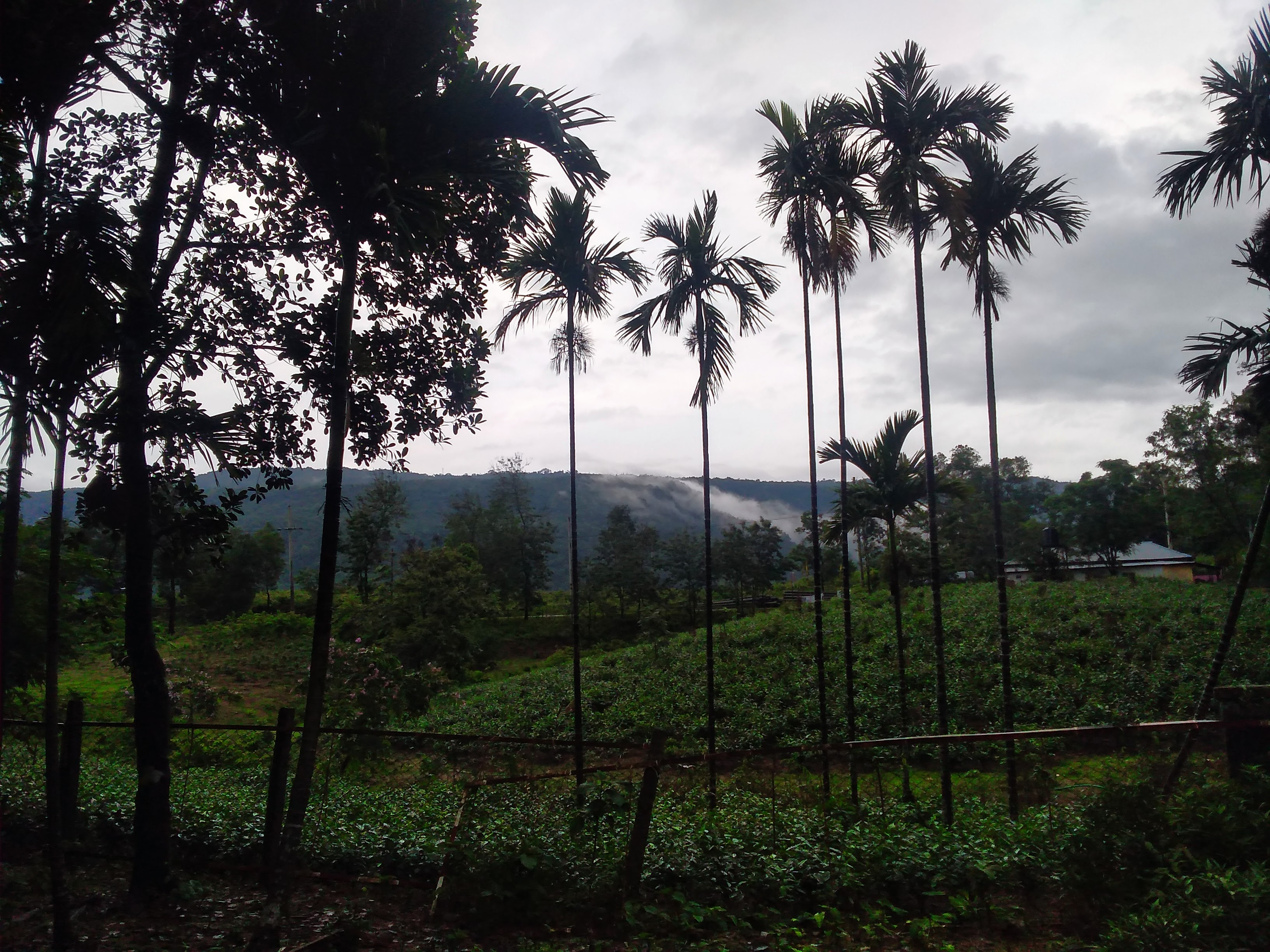
A tea garden surrounded by mountains at Sripur in Sylhet

The Bangladesh Tea Board and the Bangladesh Tea Research Institute support the production, certification and exportation of the tea trade in the country. The Bangladesh Tea Research Institute began the improvement of tea quality in 1957, selecting bushes with the best yield and quality to introduce germplasm as a system of improvement.

== See also ==
- Agriculture in Bangladesh
- Jute trade
- Economy of Sylhet
- Tea production in Kenya
- Tea production in Sri Lanka
- Tea production in the United States
