= Lövəyin =

- Village
- Location within Azerbaijan
- Coordinates: 38°32′N 48°47′E
- Country: Azerbaijan
- Rayon: Astara
- Time zone: UTC+4 (AZT)
  - Summer (DST): UTC+5 (AZT)

Lövəyin (also, Lovain and Lovan) is a village in the Astara Rayon of Azerbaijan.
