= Economy of Sylhet Division =

Economy of Sylhet

Statistics
- GDP: ▲$40 billion (Nominal, 2025); ▲$166 billion (PPP, 2025)
- Population below national poverty line: 2.5%
- Human Development Index: ▲0.650 (2021) 3rd
- Unemployment: 3.80% (2019)

The economy of Sylhet is the 3rd largest in the People's Republic of Bangladesh. It has a gross state product of $40 billion in nominal terms, and $166 billion in terms of purchasing power parity, making it the fifth largest behind Dhaka, Chittagong. Since the formation of Bangladesh, Sylhet has been regarded as the spiritual and cultural center of the country, and often termed as the agricultural capital of Bangladesh. Due to vast natural resources and emerging metropolitan, Sylhet is a major economic hub of the country alongside Dhaka and Chittagong. In recent years, Sylhet is experiencing major infrastructural developments, and projected to be the forefront of Bangladesh's economic growth. Sylhet is known for its tea plantations. About 80% of the country's agar processing factories are located in Barlekha Upazila.

As of 2025, Sylhet's per capita GDP is $3,410 in nominal terms, which is the second highest in Bangladesh.According to the World Bank, Sylhet and Chittagong have the lowest incidence of poverty in Bangladesh.

== Economy ==
Sylhet region is the most enriched area of Bangladesh. A vast quantity of proven gas reserve and Bangladesh's only oil field in located in the region.

=== Natural gas ===
Sylhet contains a vast amount of proven natural gas reserve. As of 2024, new gas reserves has been discovered in well number 7 of the Sylhet Gas Field, producing 6 to 7 million cubic feet of gas per day (MMCFD). More gas reserves have been discovered in well number 8 in Kailashtila Gas Field estimated to be 21 MMCFD. Back in January 2024 a new gas structure was found in well number 2 at Rashidpur, which has a reserve of 157 billion cubic feet (BCF). If all upgrades are completed by 2025, a total of 250 MMCFD gas can be added to the national grid. There are a total of eight gas fields located in the region. Total reserve of gas fields of the region is about 14 trillion cubit feet. According to Jalalabad Gas System Limited, The company's annual revenue earning is around 5.66 billion.

=== Remittance ===
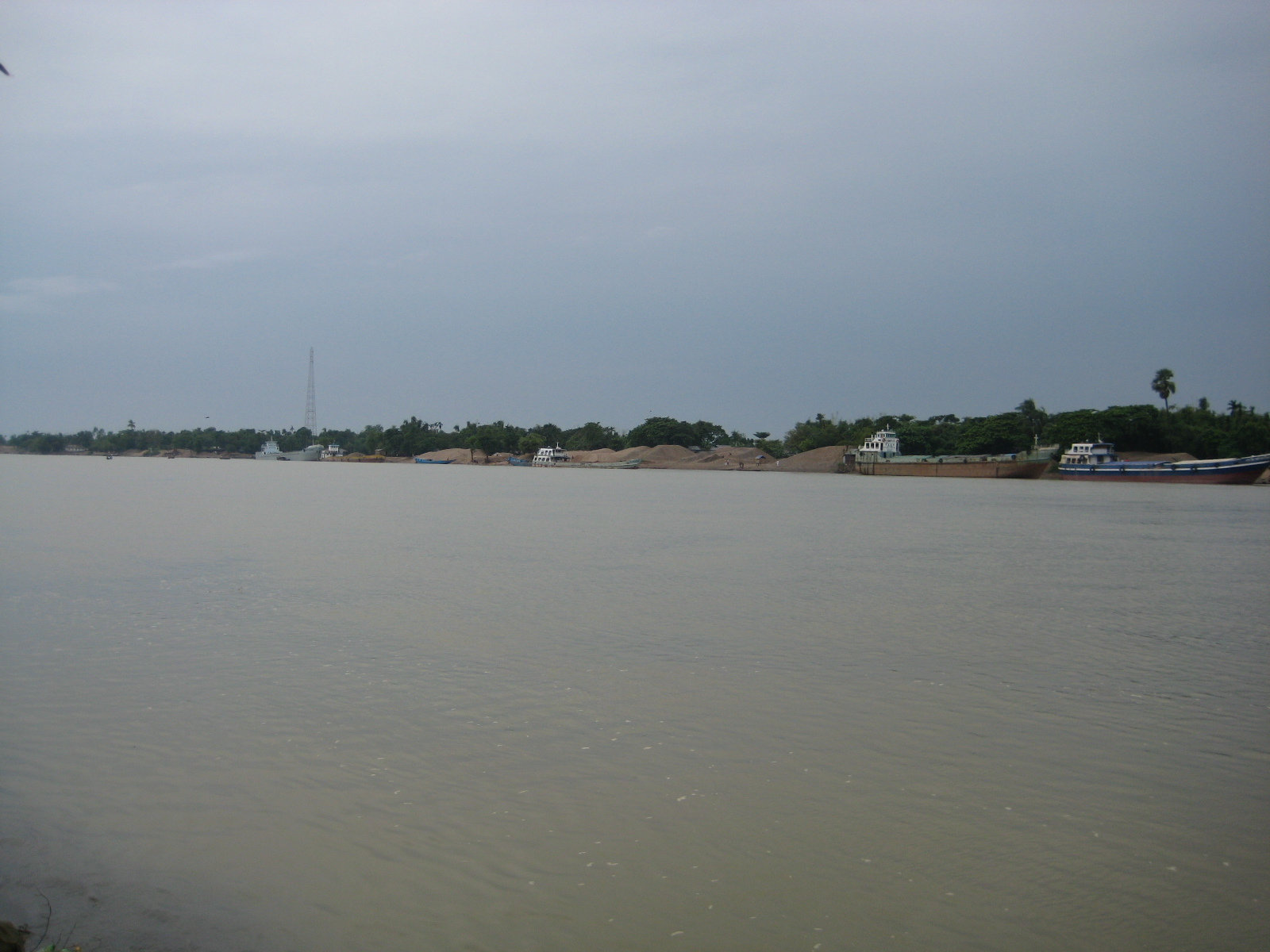
Surma River Sylhet

Remittance is one of the biggest source behind Sylhetis economic growth. Many Sylhetis that live abroad live in many countries, notably countries in the Middle East such as Saudi Arabia, the United Arab Emirates, etc., France, the United States, and the United Kingdom. Many remittances are sent from the United Kingdom to Sylhet unlike many other countries as the majority, believed to be around 90-95%, of the British Bangladeshi population claim they are from Sylhet. The remittance of financial year 2012–13 is estimated around $10 billion. Numerous projects and businesses in the city and in large towns have been funded by Sylhetis living and working abroad. As of 1986, an estimated 95 percent of the ethnic British Bangladeshis originated from or had ancestors from the Sylhet region. The city receives a significant portion of the country's annual remittances, which have driven growth in real estate and construction. A number of shopping centres, restaurants and hotels have opened as a result.

=== Tourism ===
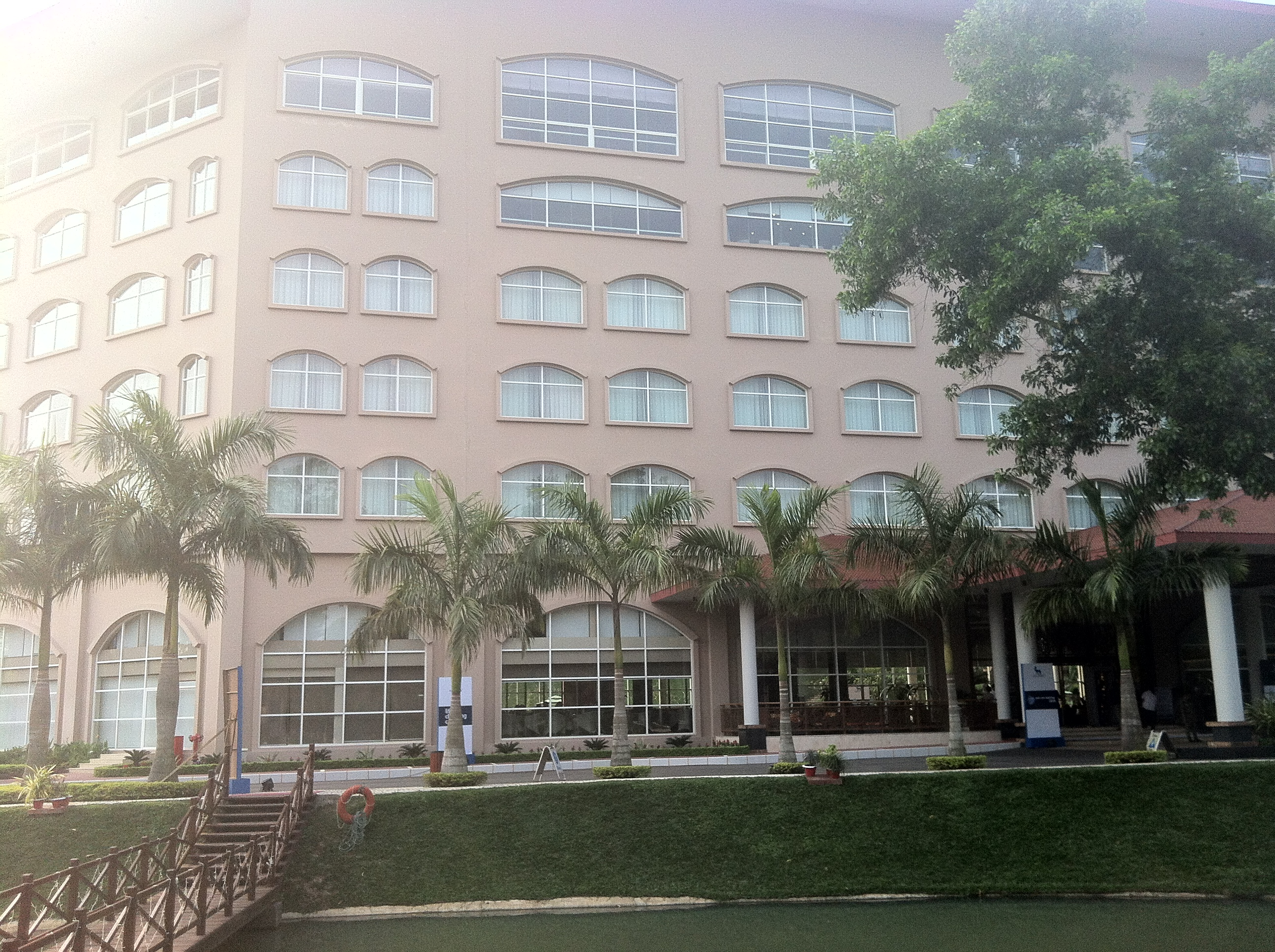
A luxurious 5 star hotel in Srimongol

Sylhet is one of the most popular tourist destinations in Bangladesh. The province offers tourists with variety of options ranging from natural to commercial. The province is home to some of the most luxurious Hotels, Resorts and Shopping Malls in Bangladesh. Sylhet also relies on religious tourism, with thousands of devotees visiting its Sufi shrines annually, as well as ecotourism in its broader natural hinterland. Nature resorts have been built in the city's outskirts.

=== Fisheries ===
A large portion of fishes in Bangladesh comes from rivers and Haor region, among them Hakaluki Haor, Tanguar Haor including many more rivers in Sylhet meet the demand of fishes in this region.

==== Tanguar haor ====
Tanguar haor plays an important role in fish production as it functions as a 'mother fishery' for the country. It is the source of livelihood for more than 40,000 people.

Every winter the haor is home to about 200 types of migratory birds. The haor is an important source of fish. In 1999–2000, the government earned 7,073,184 takas as revenue just from fisheries of the haor. There are more than 140 species of fresh water fish in the haor. The more predominant among them are: ayir, Cat fish, baim, tara, gutum, gulsha, tengra, titna, garia, beti, kakia.

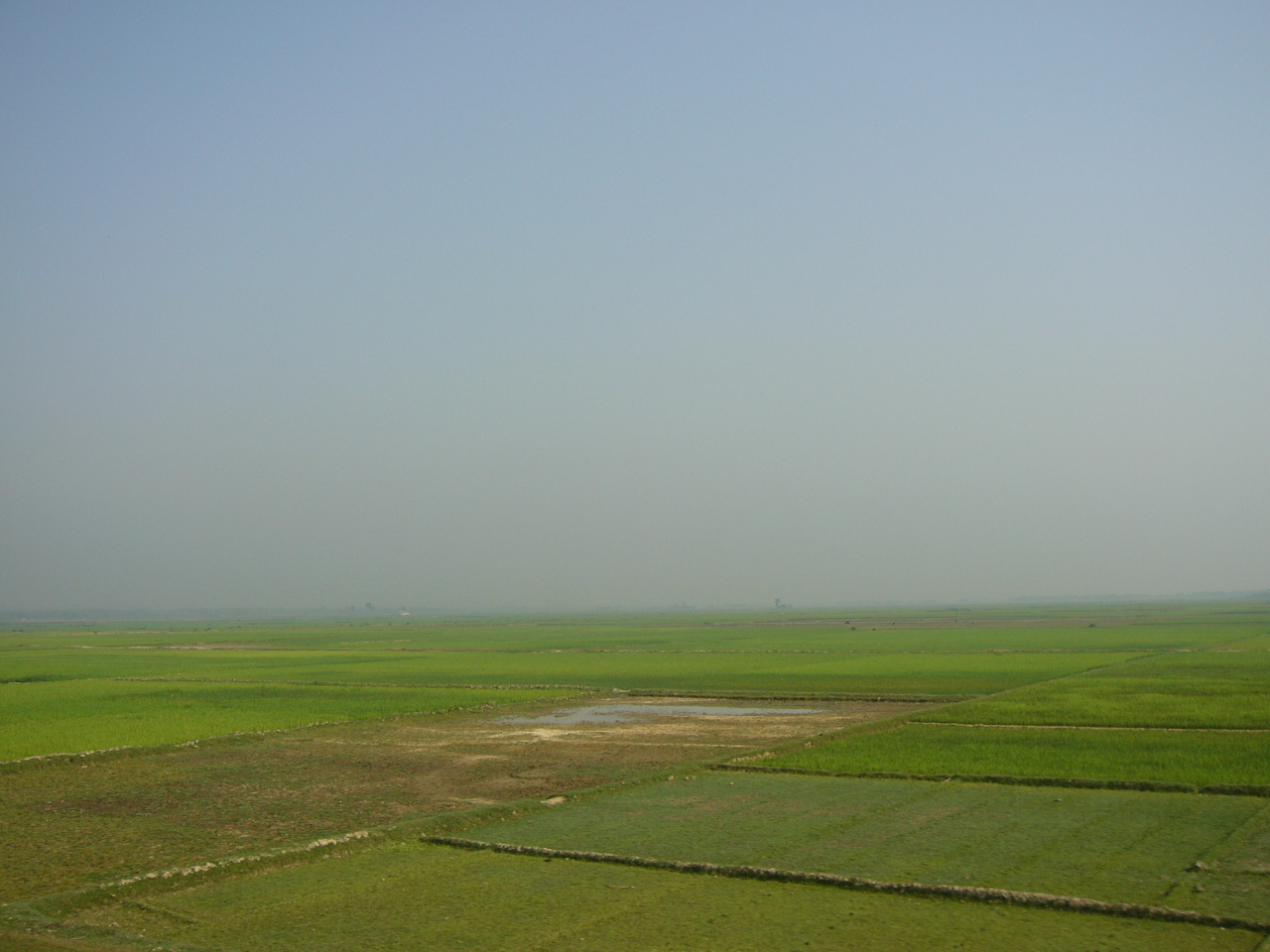
Hakaluki, the largest Hawor in Bangladesh

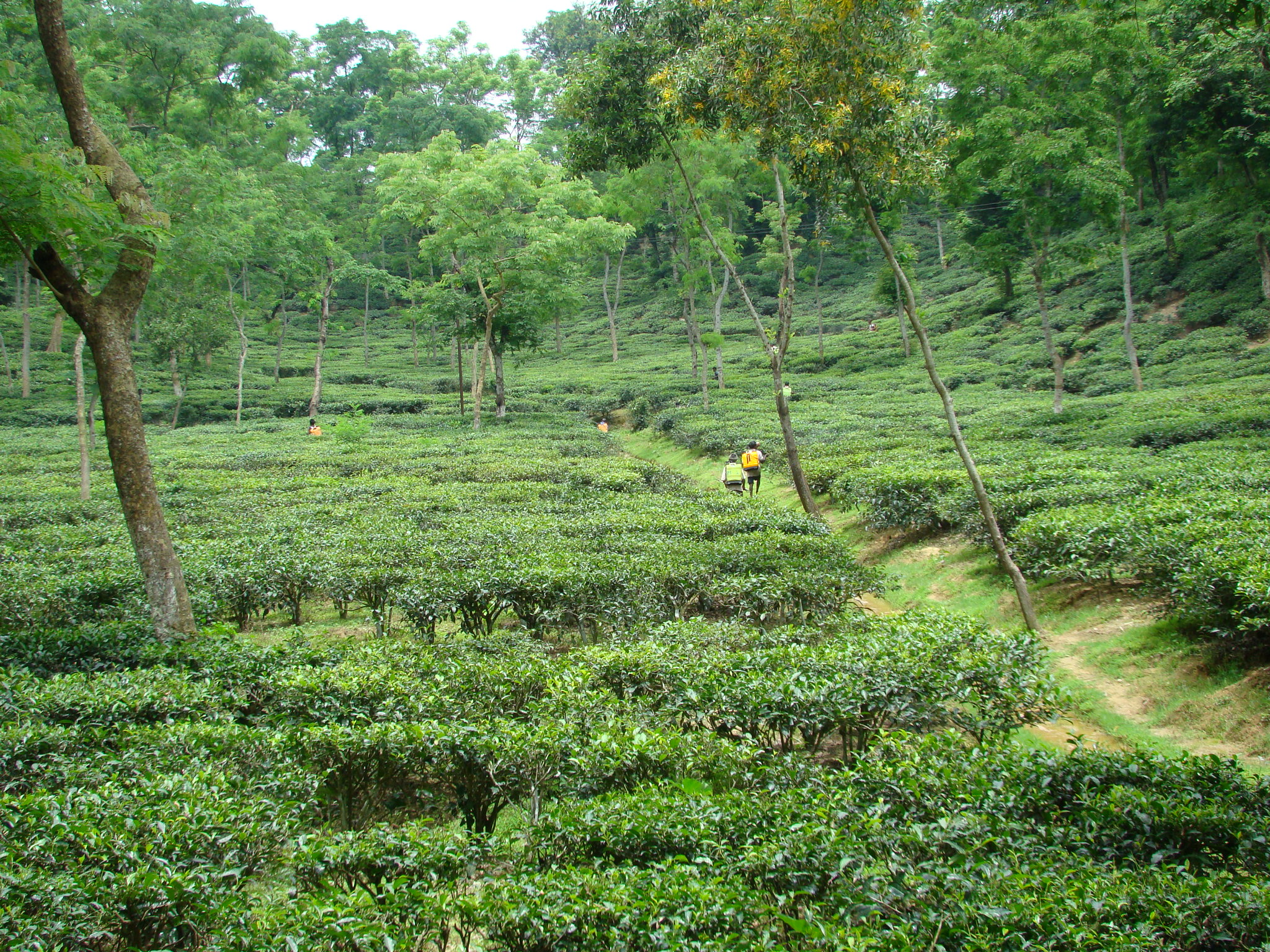
Malnicherra Tea Garden in Sylhet

=== Tea industry ===
The area around Sylhet is a traditional tea growing area. The Surma Valley is covered with terraces of tea gardens and tropical forests. Srimangal is known as the tea capital of Bangladesh; for miles around, tea gardens are visible on the hill slopes. As a result, Bangladesh Tea Research Institute (BTRI) is an autonomous organisation under the Bangladesh Tea Board (BTB). have been established here. Today, Bangladesh has 172 commercial tea estates, including many of the world's largest working plantations. Among which, Sylhet has over 150 tea gardens, including three of the largest tea plantations in the world, both in terms of area and production. The area Nearly 300,000 workers, of which more than 75% are women, are employed on the tea estates. The industry accounts for 3% of global tea production, and employs more than 4 million people.

Tea is the second largest export oriented cash crop of Bangladesh, following jute. The industry accounts for 1% of national GDP. Including Moulvibazar, Habiganj, Sylhet, this area has three Tea-producing districts.
