= Tea production in Indonesia =

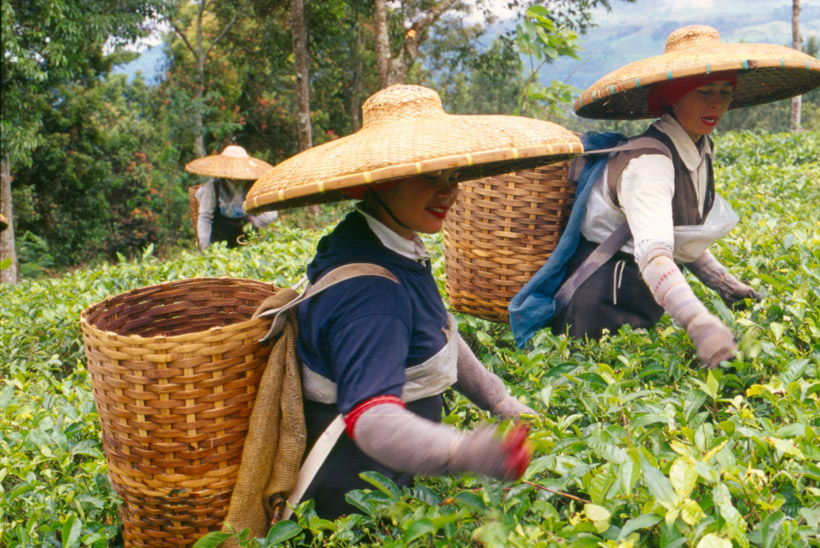
Tea pickers in Bogor, West Java.

Indonesia was the world's eighth-largest tea producer in 2023, primarily producing black tea with some production of green tea for local consumption. Smallholder farmers control the largest bulk of tea plantations, and most national production came from West Java.

Tea was introduced to Java during the Dutch East Indies period, and in the 19th century was part of the Dutch Cultivation System and became a major component of colonial exports. In the early 20th century, the Dutch East Indies was the largest exporter of tea outside India and Sri Lanka. Following the Second World War and Indonesian independence, exports and production began to decline, first due to the Japanese occupation and later due to the shift to domestic consumption.

== History ==
Tea plants were introduced to modern Indonesia during the colonial period, when German botanist Andreas Cleyer brought tea seeds from Japan to Batavia in 1684. Small-scale cultivation in gardens were done in the 17th century, and unsuccessful efforts were made in the 18th century to establish commercial plantations. Efforts in the 1820s saw success in experimental plantations of Japanese tea seeds at the Bogor Botanical Gardens, and tea was made part of the Cultivation System by Governor-General Johannes van den Bosch in 1828. Assam tea seeds from Ceylon were introduced in 1877. Plantations were initially established in Java, although they spread to North Sumatra in the early 20th century.

In the early 20th century, the Dutch East Indies was the third largest source of tea exports, after British India and Ceylon, exporting more tea than China, and tea was the second-most valuable export from the colony behind rubber. An oversupply of tea led to a cartel being formed by European producers in India, Ceylon and the Dutch East Indies in 1930, but the cartel initially failed to maintain high prices for 3 years due to production by small-scale farmers in Indonesia. Tea production declined precipitously during the Japanese occupation as tea plantations were converted to food crops.

After the Indonesian National Revolution, Dutch-owned tea plantations were nationalized by the Indonesian government, while plantations owned by non-Dutch firms were acquired by private companies. Tea remained a major export, but production began to shift from export plantations to smallholder farms for domestic consumption. Export volumes declined, with 1965 exports being just 53 percent of prewar volumes, although the country was still the world's fourth-largest exporter. Modern tea processing factories were established in the late 20th century. Primarily, the country produces black tea, although small-scale production of green tea for use in local jasmine tea is also popular. National tea production has seen gradual decline in the 21st century, from around 160 thousand tons in 2000 to around 120 thousand in the 2020s.

== Statistics ==
According to Statistics Indonesia, national tea production in 2022 was 124,662 tonnes, compared to 165,194 tonnes in 2002, produced from an area of 101,281 hectares. Around half of the plantation area were held by smallholders. Government-owned plantations and smallholders made up most of the production, with large private estates producing just under 20% of the total. Around two-thirds of national production originated in West Java, with Central Java and North Sumatra making up half the rest. 45 thousand tonnes of tea were exported in 2022, worth USD 90 million, predominantly black tea. In 2023, Indonesia was the eighth-largest producer of tea in the world, down from fifth in 2019. Productivity is relatively low due to aged tea plants, with Dutch-planted trees still being harvested in some cases. The Indonesian Tea Council claims that the tea industry employs over 200 thousand workers nationally. Canned and bottled tea made up 77 percent of national consumption in 2016, with Sosro's Teh botol being the oldest brand. Domestic tea demand had increased from 0.23 kg per capita to 0.38 between 2008 and 2022, primarily due to popularity of ready-drink tea brands. The three largest bagged tea brands in Indonesia by volume in 2023 were Sariwangi (Savoria-owned), Sosro, and Tong Tji.
