= Ruan zhi =

Tea plant cultivar

- Type: Oolong
- Other names: Qingxin, # 17
- Origin: Anxi, Fujian Province, China
- Quick description: Light highland oolong

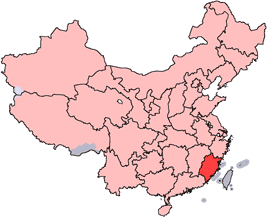
Ruan zhi is grown in Fujian province, China.

Ruan zhi or ruanzhi (simplified Chinese: 軟枝; traditional Chinese: 軟枝; pinyin: ruǎn zhī; lit. 'soft stem'; pronounced [ɻwàn ʈʂɻ̩́]) is a cultivar of the tea plant that is usually processed into oolong. The tea is also known as qingxin (Chinese: 青心; pinyin: qīng xīn; lit. 'green heart'; pronounced [tɕʰíŋ ɕín]) or #17 (no. 17). It originates from Anxi County in Fujian province, in the People's Republic of China. The taste is light and the aroma is often compared to orchids. This tea variety is used to produce famous highland oolong teas such as tung-tin (dongding), Oriental beauty (donfang meiren), and baozhong (pouchong).

== See also ==
- Oolong
- Taiwanese tea
