= Huangjin Gui =

Chinese oolong tea

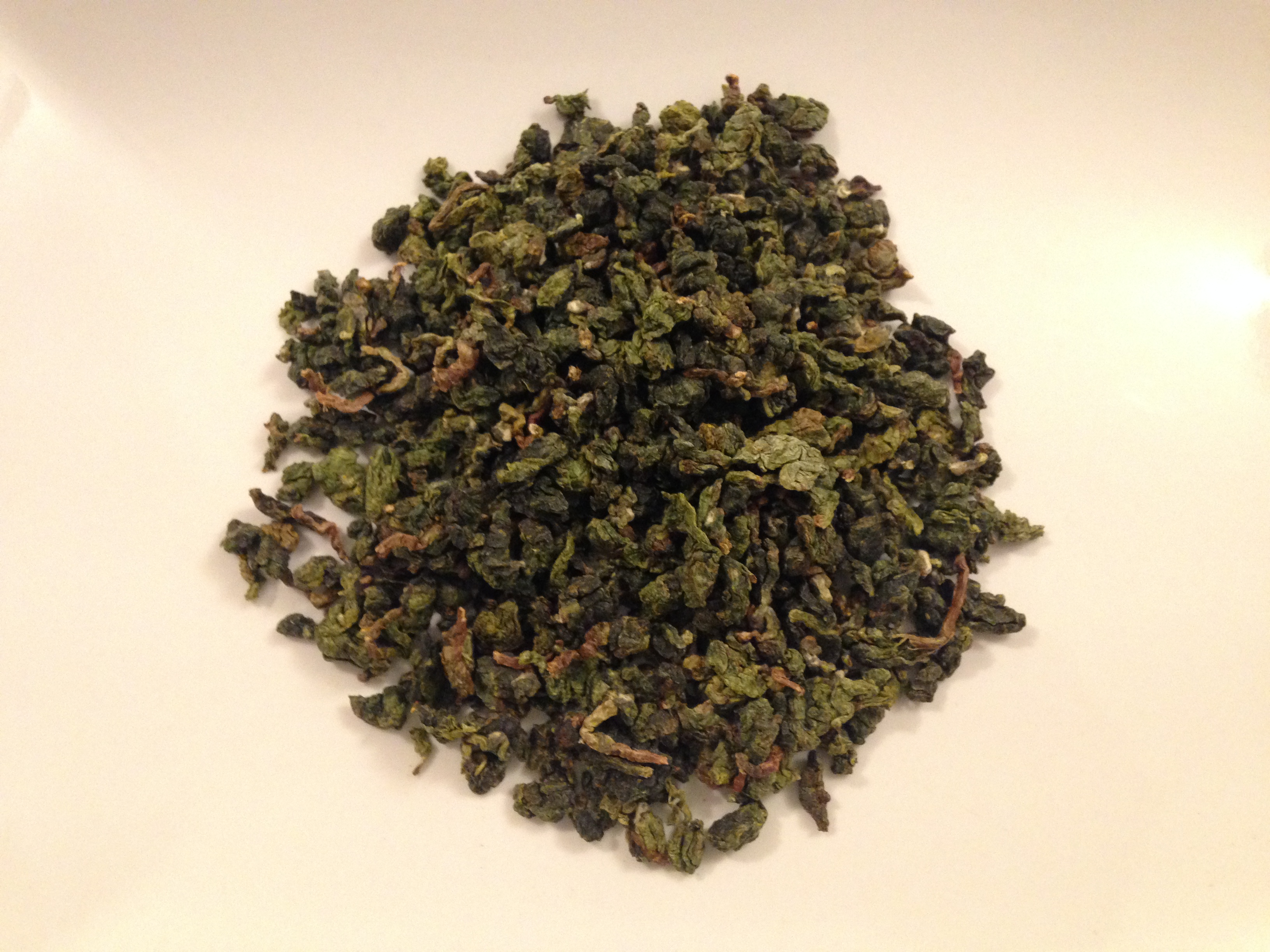
- Huangjin Gui Tea Leaves
- Type: Oolong
- Other names: Golden Osmanthus, Golden Cassia
- Origin: Anxi County, Fujian Province, China
- Quick description: Similar to Tieguanyin with a fruity taste and aroma
- Temperature: 90-95°C

Fujian province

Huangjin Gui (simplified Chinese: 黄金桂; traditional Chinese: 黃金桂; pinyin: huángjīn guì; pronounced [xwǎŋtɕín kwêɪ]) is a premium variety of Chinese oolong tea traditionally from Anxi in Fujian province. Named after the yellow golden color of its budding leaves and its unique flowery aroma, it is said to be reminiscent of Osmanthus.

This oolong is similar to Tieguanyin, with only a little oxidation. Consequently, it has a very flowery, delicate aroma without the astringency of a green tea or the heaviness of a Red/Black Tea.

== Legends ==
There are two legends behind this tea: the Wang/Marriage legend and the legend of farmer Wei. Both date its origins back to about the mid-nineteenth century.

=== Wang legend ===
The first legend is in 1860 that this tea originated from tea seedling given to Lin Ziqin by the bride Wang Dan from her home on their wedding day and planted next to their ancestral temple. The plants that grew were to represent the prosperity of their ancestors and families uniting. As a result, it is often given as a wedding present. The tea produced from these had a unique golden color and fragrance like osmanthus, so named as Huang Dan which has similar pronunciation to Wang Dan according to local language.

=== Wei legend ===
The other story is in 1850 that a tea farmer named Wei Zhen was strolling by a brook when he noticed a golden plant on the horizon. As a tea farmer he felt obligated to take a sample and cultivate it. To his surprise it had very powerful fragrance of osmanthus and light yet yellow color liquid remained, so together with neighbors they named it as Huang Dan ("Huang" is yellow in English while "Dan" is light).

In 1900s tea merchant Lin Jintai got this tea very popular in South East Asia, even as precious as gold, but the old name Huang Dan was not attractive enough, so he changed to Huang Jin Gui("Huang" is yellow, "Jin" is gold while "Gui" is osmanthus).

== Mother bush ==
There are two Huang Jin Gui mother bushes corresponding to different legend. One is about Wang legend in Luo Yan village, one is about Wei legend in Mei Zhuang village. According to the government file, Mei Zhuang village was split up from Luo Yan village in 1961. Both locations got big protective change recently. The farm where Wang legend mother bush locate is made into a beautiful park in 2017, the mother bush is protective with introductory text about its story and history.

Mother bush of Wang legend had a stone tablet set up in 2009 which introduce its history and cited support by the Bureau of Finance of Fujian province. There is a small ancestral temple next to it.
