= Dongfang meiren =

Oolong tea

Dongfang meiren 東方美人
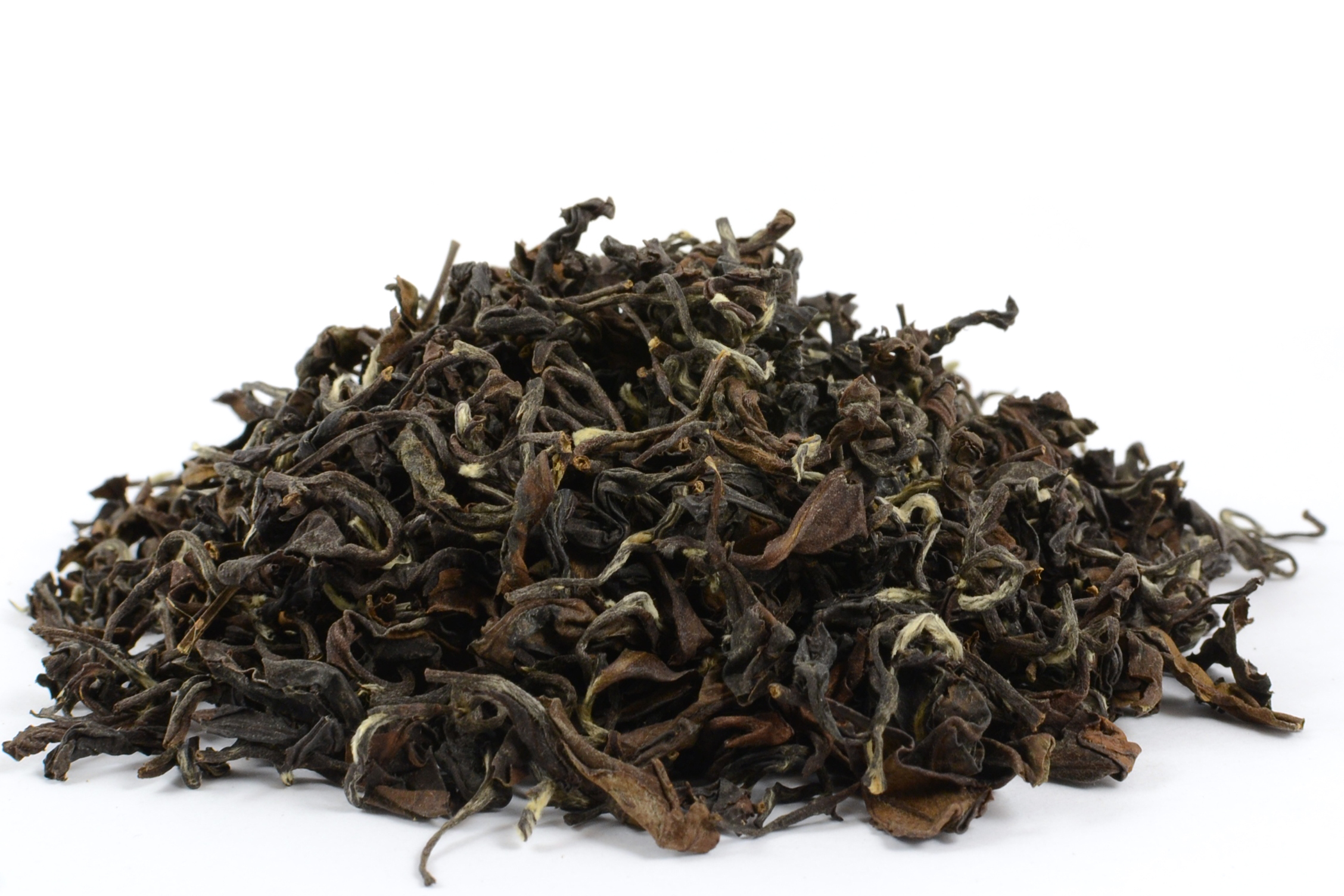
- Type: Oolong
- Other names: Oriental beauty, eastern beauty, white-tip oolong
- Origin: Taiwan
- Quick description: The harvests in summer are most prized for their fruit-and-honey aroma
- Temperature: 80–85°C

Dongfang meiren
- Chinese: 東方美人茶
- Literal meaning: eastern beauty tea
Transcriptions
Standard Mandarin
- Hanyu Pinyin: dōngfāng měirén chá
- IPA: [tʊ́ŋ.fáŋ mèɪ.ɻə̌n ʈʂʰǎ]
Southern Min
- Hokkien POJ: Tang-hong Bí-jîn-tê

Alternative Chinese name
- Chinese: 白毫烏龍茶
- Literal meaning: white-tip oolong tea
Transcriptions
Standard Mandarin
- Hanyu Pinyin: báiháo wūlóng chá
- IPA: [pǎɪ.xǎʊ ú.lʊ̌ŋ ʈʂʰǎ]

Second alternative Chinese name
- Chinese: 椪風茶
Transcriptions
Hakka
- Romanization: phong-fûng chhà

Third alternative Chinese name
- Chinese: 膨風茶
Transcriptions
Southern Min
- Hokkien POJ: phòng-hong tê

Dongfang meiren (simplified Chinese: 东方美人; traditional Chinese: 東方美人; pinyin: dōngfāng měirén; lit. 'eastern beauty') or Oriental Beauty, or baihao (白毫), among other Chinese names, is a heavily oxidized, non-roasted, tip-type oolong tea originating in Hsinchu County, Taiwan. It is a tea produced from leaves bitten by the tea jassid, an insect that feeds on the tea plant. Terpenes are released in the bitten leaves, which creates a honey-like taste. Oriental beauty, white-tip oolong, and champagne oolong are other names under which dongfang meiren is marketed in the West.

The tea has natural fruity and honey-like aromas and produces a sweet-tasting beverage, bright reddish-orange in color, without any bitterness. Dried leaves of high quality exhibit a pleasant aroma, with leaf coloration of dark purple and brown tones with white hairs.

== Production ==
Dongfang meiren is produced from a variety of cultivars of the tea plant, Camellia sinensis, that are grown without insecticides to encourage a common pest, the tea jassid (Jacobiasca formosana), to feed on the leaves, stems, and buds. These insects suck the phloem juices of the tea stems, leaves, and buds. This leads to the plant's defensive production of monoterpene diol and hotrienol which give the tea its unique flavor. The buds then turn white along the edges which gives the tea its alternate name, white-tip oolong. The insect bites start the oxidation of the leaves and tips and add a sweet note to the tea.

This process has inspired makers of other types of tea, such as dongding oolong and the east-coast black teas of Hualien and Taitung Counties, to withhold insecticide use in order to replicate this process in other teas. Similar action of jassids and thrips helps form the muscatel-like flavor of India's second flush Darjeeling tea to which dongfang meiren is sometimes compared.

Because of the need for J. formosana feeding, the tea must be grown in warmer areas. In Taiwan, it is primarily grown in Hakka areas of the hilly northwestern part of the country at lower altitudes (300–800 m or 980–2,620 ft) between the mountains and the plains. Beipu and Emei in Hsinchu County are noted centers of production with Beipu being the site of the Beipu Penghong Tea Museum and hosting the annual Penghong Tea Industry and Culture Festival.

The tea bushes are planted on the leeward side of hills in areas with sufficient humidity and sunshine. The tea is only harvested in the middle of summer, only about 40–50% of the leaves can be used, and the harvest is susceptible to drought. Therefore, the annual yield is low and the price is relatively high.

After being harvested from young leaves and tips in the summer, the tea is heavily oxidized (around 70%), approaching the level of black tea. Unlike other oolongs, which typically make use of the top four or five leaves and the single bud, dongfang meiren uses only the bud and two leaves. The moisture content of dongfang meiren is higher than that of high mountain oolongs so the withering process takes longer. This longer withering period accelerates the hydrolysis and oxidation processes which help generate the typical sweet flavor and taste of this tea.

== Preparation ==
Dongfang meiren is brewed with lower temperature water (80–85 °C or 176–185 °F) than is typical for other oolongs. It also requires a longer brewing (1–2 minutes for the first pot and then longer for subsequent brewings, in the Western style). Like other oolongs, the leaves can be steeped multiple times.

== History and names ==
This variety of tea originated in the late 19th century, when Taiwan first exported oolong tea. Tea merchant John Dodd exported this tea to the west from his Tamsui base.

Dongfang meiren is usually marketed as 東方美人茶 (dōngfāng měirén chá) in Mandarin Chinese and translated as 'eastern or Oriental beauty tea' in English. More recently, the term 白毫烏龍茶 (báiháo wūlóng chá), translated as 'white-tip oolong tea' has been used. Beginning in the 1970s, the term Oriental has become generally and increasingly disfavored in some Western countries.

In Taiwanese, farmers originally used names that referred to the insect pest that plagues the plant. These include 煙仔茶 (ian-á tê), 蝝仔茶, 蜒仔茶, and 涎仔茶 (the latter three pronounced iân-á tê). As the tea began fetching higher prices, 膨風茶 (phòng-hong tê; 'bragging or bluffing tea') became the common name. In Siyen Hakka, in addition to the name 椪風茶 (phong-fûng chhà; also 'bragging/bluffing tea'), the term 冰風茶 (pên-fûng chhà) is also used.

Popular stories as to the origin of the tea and its names abound. For example:

It was once thought that a tea farmer in Beipu noticed that small green insects, later known as cicadas, had damaged the leaves of his newly picked spring crop. Rather than destroying his crop, he decided to process the leaves into tea. He then took his product to a local tea merchant, who liked it well enough to pay him twice the price of his usual tea. When he returned to his village, he boasted to his neighbors about his success. His neighbors believed he was exaggerating and so named his tea, Peng Feng Cha [膨風茶], or Braggart's tea.

— Beipu Old Street restaurateur Huang Zhen-mei (黃珍梅)

== See also ==
- Taiwanese tea
- Taiwanese tea culture
- Oolong tea
