= Qilan tea =

Chinese oolong tea

Qilan
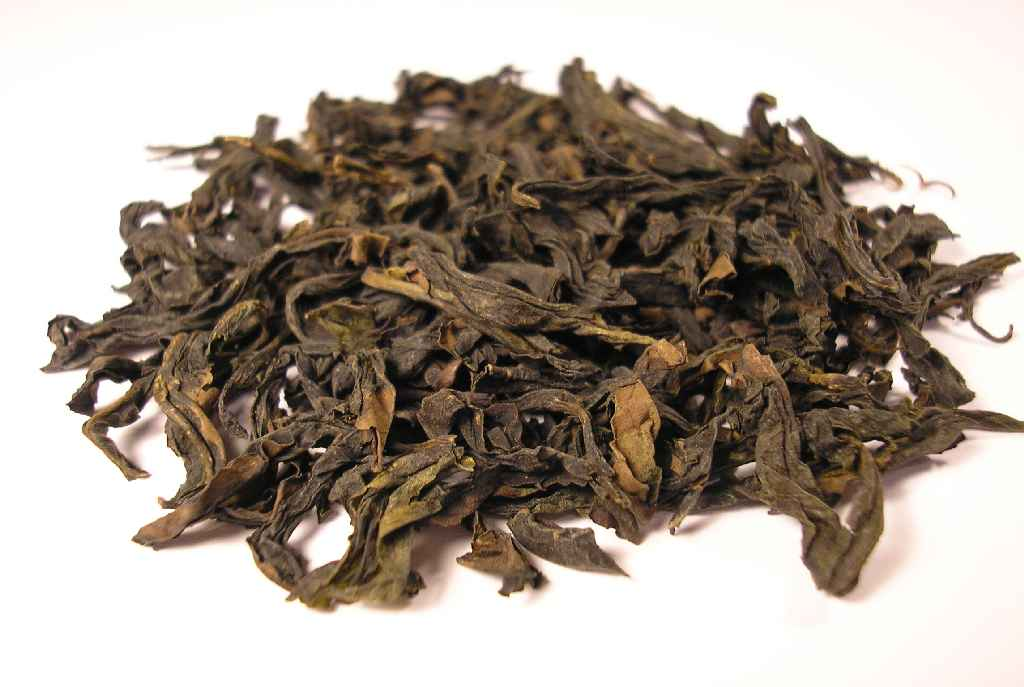
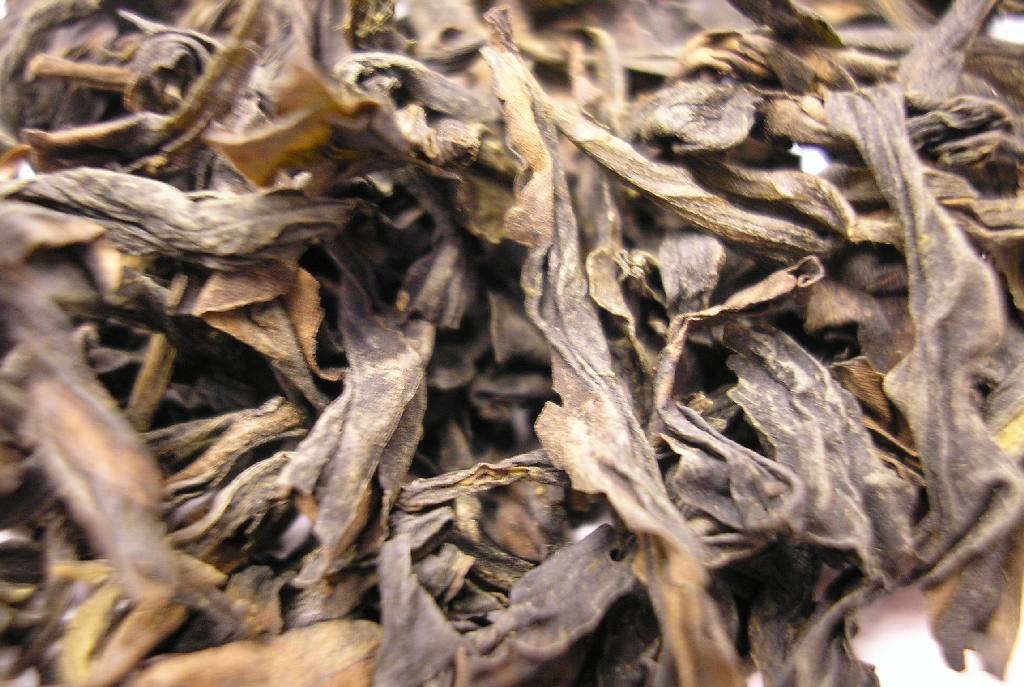
- Type: Oolong
- Other names: Rare Orchid, Profound Orchid
- Origin: Mount Wuyi, Fujian Province, China
- Quick description: Fruity Wuyi tea.

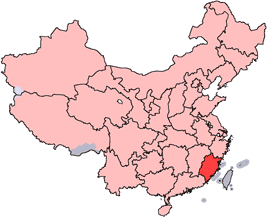
Qilan tea is grown in Fujian province, China.

Qilan (simplified Chinese: 奇兰; traditional Chinese: 奇蘭; pinyin: qílán; Pe̍h-ōe-jī: kî-lân; lit. 'rare orchid'; Standard Chinese pronunciation [tɕʰǐ.lǎn]) is a very mild Wuyi oolong tea. It has an obvious sweet and nutty aroma.

== See also ==
- Huang Mei Gui
