= Sivagami Ammayar =

Sivagami Ammayar was an Indian freedom fighter and member of the Indian National Army. Born in Tamil Nadu and later migrating to Malaysia, she was inspired by Netaji Subash Chandra Bose to join the freedom struggle at a young age.

== Early life ==
Sivagami Ammayar was born in 1933 to Marimuthu Mudaliyar and Chinnathai in Annasagaram village, located in the Dharmapuri district of Tamil Nadu, India. Early in her life, she migrated to Malaysia with her family, where her father worked on a tea estate.

== Education ==
In Malaysia, Sivagami Ammayar pursued her education at the Jai Hind Hindu Padasalai in Kuala Lumpur.

== Role in the Indian National Army ==
At the age of 11, Sivagami Ammayar was deeply inspired by a speech given by Netaji Subash Chandra Bose. Motivated by his call for India's independence, she joined the Indian National Army (INA) and became a member of the 'Balak Sena' group, which was dedicated to young boys and girls.

Between 1942 and 1945, Sivagami Ammayar served as a caretaker and head of the Social Welfare Hostel.

== Contribution during World War II ==
During World War II, Sivagami Ammayar, along with her brother Paranthaman, actively participated in rescuing people injured by bombings at the Sarkar Camp.
