= Tieguanyin =

Chinese oolong tea

Tieguanyin 铁观音
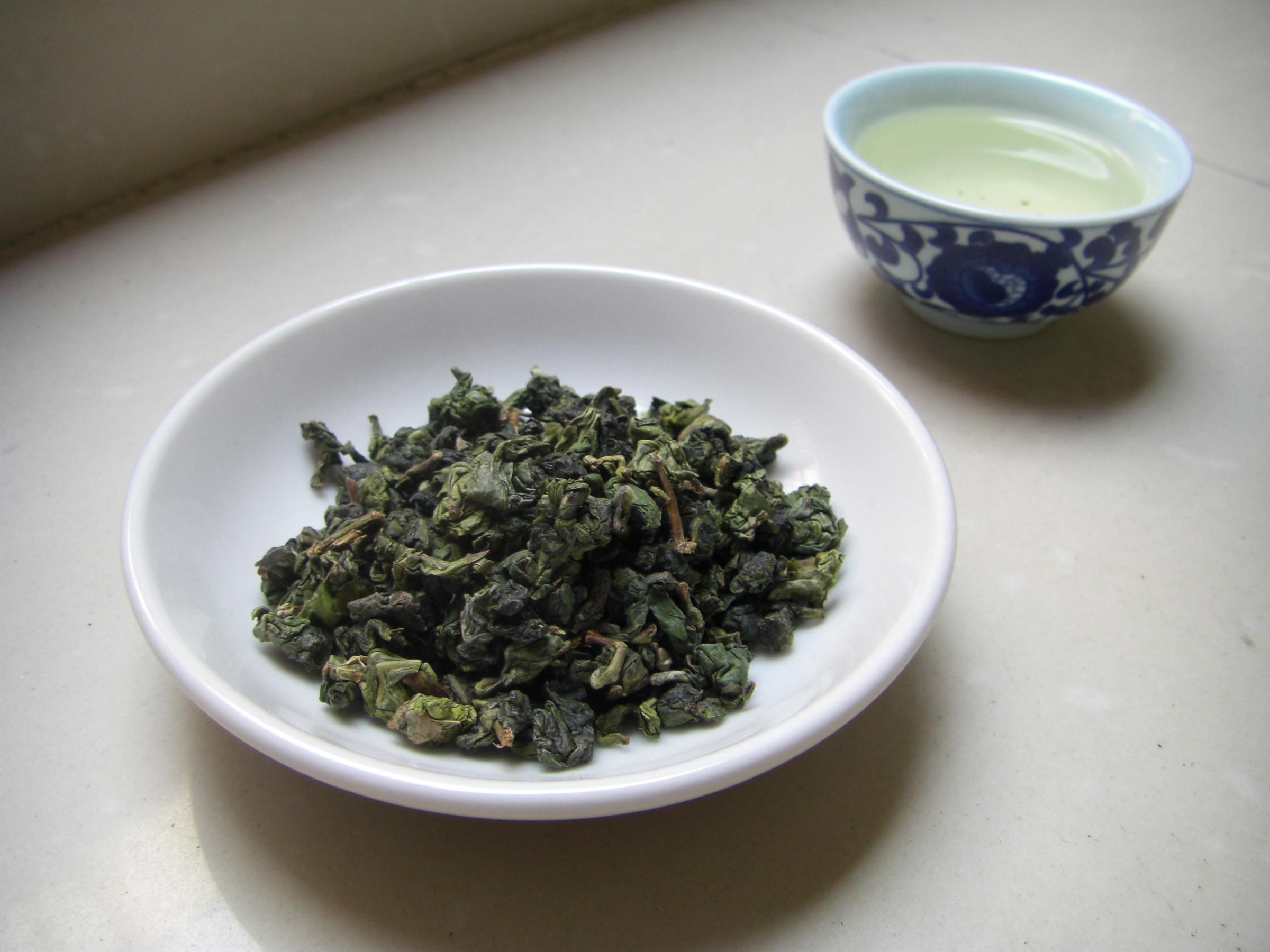
- Type: Oolong
- Other names: Iron Goddess, Iron Guanyin, Ti Kuan Yin, Tiet Kwun Yum
- Origin: Anxi County at Fujian in China
- Quick description: The harvests in spring (also known as Jade) and autumn are most prized for the fruity, sometimes even berry taste and aroma
- Temperature: 90–95 °C (194–203 °F)

Chinese name
- Traditional Chinese: 鐵觀音
- Simplified Chinese: 铁观音
- Literal meaning: 'Iron Guanyin'
Transcriptions
Standard Mandarin
- Hanyu Pinyin: tiěguānyīn
- Wade–Giles: t‘ieh^{3}-kuan^{1}-in^{1}
- IPA: [tʰjè.kwán.ín]
Wu
- Romanization: ^{7}thiq-^{1}kuoe-in
Hakka
- Romanization: thiet-kôn-yîm
Yue: Cantonese
- Yale Romanization: titgūnyām
- Jyutping: tit3 gun1 jam1
- IPA: [tʰit̚˧.kun˥.jɐm˥]
Southern Min
- Hokkien POJ: thih-koan-im
- Teochew Peng'im: tiê4-kuan1-im1
Eastern Min
- Fuzhou BUC: tiék-guăng-ĭng

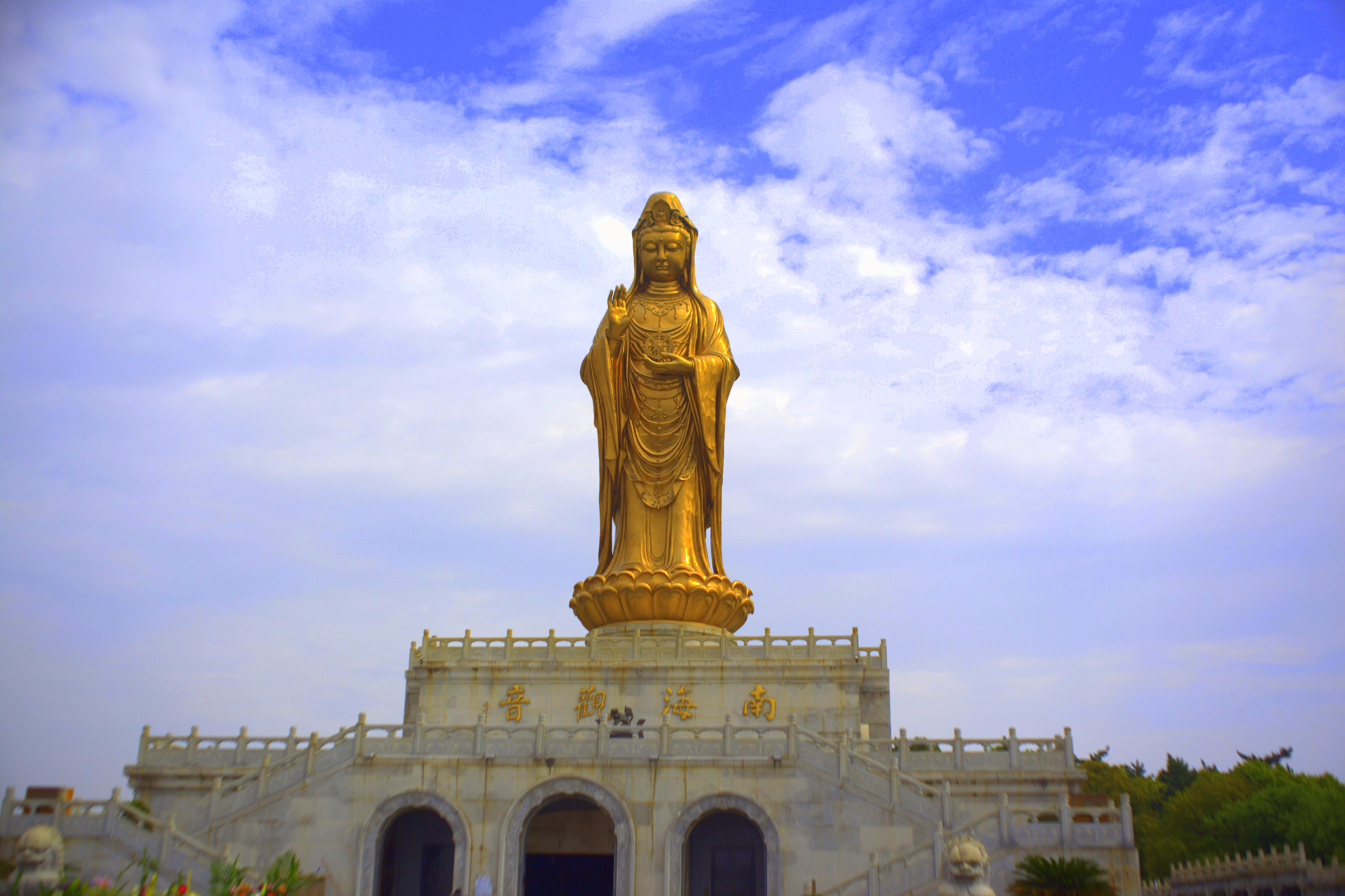
Statue of Guanyin at Mount Putuo, Zhejiang, China

Tieguanyin (simplified Chinese: 铁观音; traditional Chinese: 鐵觀音; lit. 'Iron Guanyin') is a variety of Chinese oolong tea that originated in the 19th century in Anxi in Fujian province. Tieguanyin produced in different areas of Anxi have different gastronomic characteristics.

== Name ==
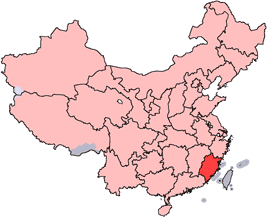
Tieguanyin is grown in Fujian province, China.

The tea is named after the Chinese Goddess of Mercy Guanyin, Guanyin is an embodiment of Avalokiteśvara Bodhisattva. Other spellings and names include "Ti Kuan Yin", "Tit Kwun Yum", "Ti Kwan Yin", "Iron Buddha", "Iron Goddess Oolong", and "Tea of the Iron Bodhisattva". It is also known in its abbreviated form as "TGY".

== Legends ==
There are two legends behind this tea: Wei and Wang.

=== Wei legend ===
Modern scholarship agrees that Tieguanyin originated in Anxi, Fujian, during the Qing dynasty, and that multiple legends exist—one of which features the devout farmer Wei Yin receiving guidance from Guanyin in a dream. This legend is not historically verifiable, but it is culturally influential and commonly retold.

According to the most popular folk legend about the origin of Tieguanyin tea, which is widely circulated in China and Taiwan, during the Yongzheng era of the Qing dynasty there lived an elderly tea farmer named Wei Yin in Xiping, Anxi, Fujian. Known for his sincere devotion to the Bodhisattva Guanyin, he is said to have received a divine dream one night. In the dream, Guanyin guided him to search for a special tea plant growing in a crevice among the rocks. Following the vision, Wei Yin later discovered a remarkable tea bush exactly where the dream had indicated. He brought it home, cultivated it with great care, and crafted tea from its leaves. Because the plant was found through Guanyin’s guidance, and because the finished tea leaves were dark, lustrous, and heavy like iron, Wei Yin named the tea "Tieguanyin," meaning "Iron Buddha".

Two tea merchants in Canada and the UK recounted a different version of the story, with slightly different details and a more dramatic plot, but no similar version was found in China or Taiwan:

In Fujian's Anxi County, there was a run-down temple which held an iron statue of Guanyin, the Bodhisattva of Compassion. Every day on the walk to his tea fields, a poor farmer named Wei would pass by and reflect on the temple's worsening condition. "Something has to be done," he thought.

Being poor, Wei did not have the means to repair the temple. One day, he brought a broom and some incense from his home. He swept the temple clean and lit the incense as an offering to Guanyin. "It's the least I can do," he thought to himself. And he did this twice a week for many months.

One night, Guanyin appeared to him in a dream, telling him of a cave behind the temple where a treasure awaited. He was to take the treasure and share it with others. In the cave, the farmer found a tea shoot. He planted it in his field and nurtured it into a large bush, from which the finest tea was produced. He gave cuttings of this rare plant to all his neighbors and began selling the tea under the name Tieguanyin, Iron Bodhisattva of Compassion.

Over time, Wei and all his neighbors prospered; the run-down temple of Guanyin was repaired and became a beacon for the region. From this time onwards Mr. Wei took joy in the daily trip to his tea fields, never failing to stop in appreciation of the beautiful temple.

=== Wang legend ===
Wang was a scholar who accidentally discovered the tea plant beneath the Guanyin rock in Xiping. He brought the plant back home for cultivation. When he visited the Qianlong Emperor in the 6th year of his reign, he offered the tea as a gift from his native village. The emperor was so impressed that he inquired about its origin. Since the tea was discovered beneath the Guanyin Rock, he decided to call it the Guanyin tea.

== Processing of Tieguanyin tea ==
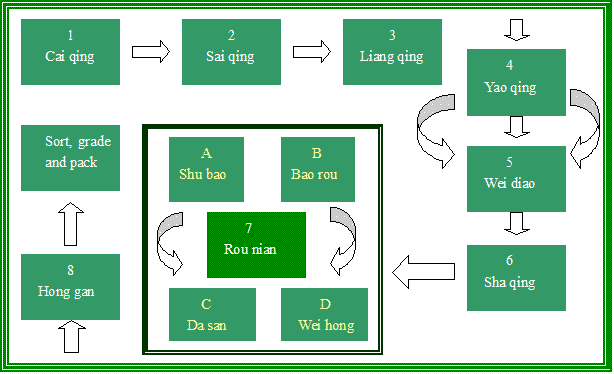

The processing of Tieguanyin tea is complex and requires expertise. Even if the tea leaf is of high raw quality and is plucked at the ideal time, if it is not processed correctly, its true character will not be shown. This is why the method of processing Tieguanyin tea was kept a secret.

1. plucking tea leaves (Chinese: 採青; pinyin: cǎi qīng)
2. sun withering (Chinese: 晒青; pinyin: shài qīng)
3. cooling (Chinese: 晾青; pinyin: liàng qīng)
4. tossing (Chinese: 搖青; pinyin: yáo qīng)
5. withering, this includes some oxidation. (Chinese: 萎凋; pinyin: wěi diào)
6. fixation (Chinese: 殺青; pinyin: shā qīng)
7. rolling (Chinese: 揉捻; pinyin: róu niǎn)
8. drying (Chinese: 烘乾; pinyin: hōng gān)

After drying some teas go through the added processes of roasting and scenting.

== Varieties ==
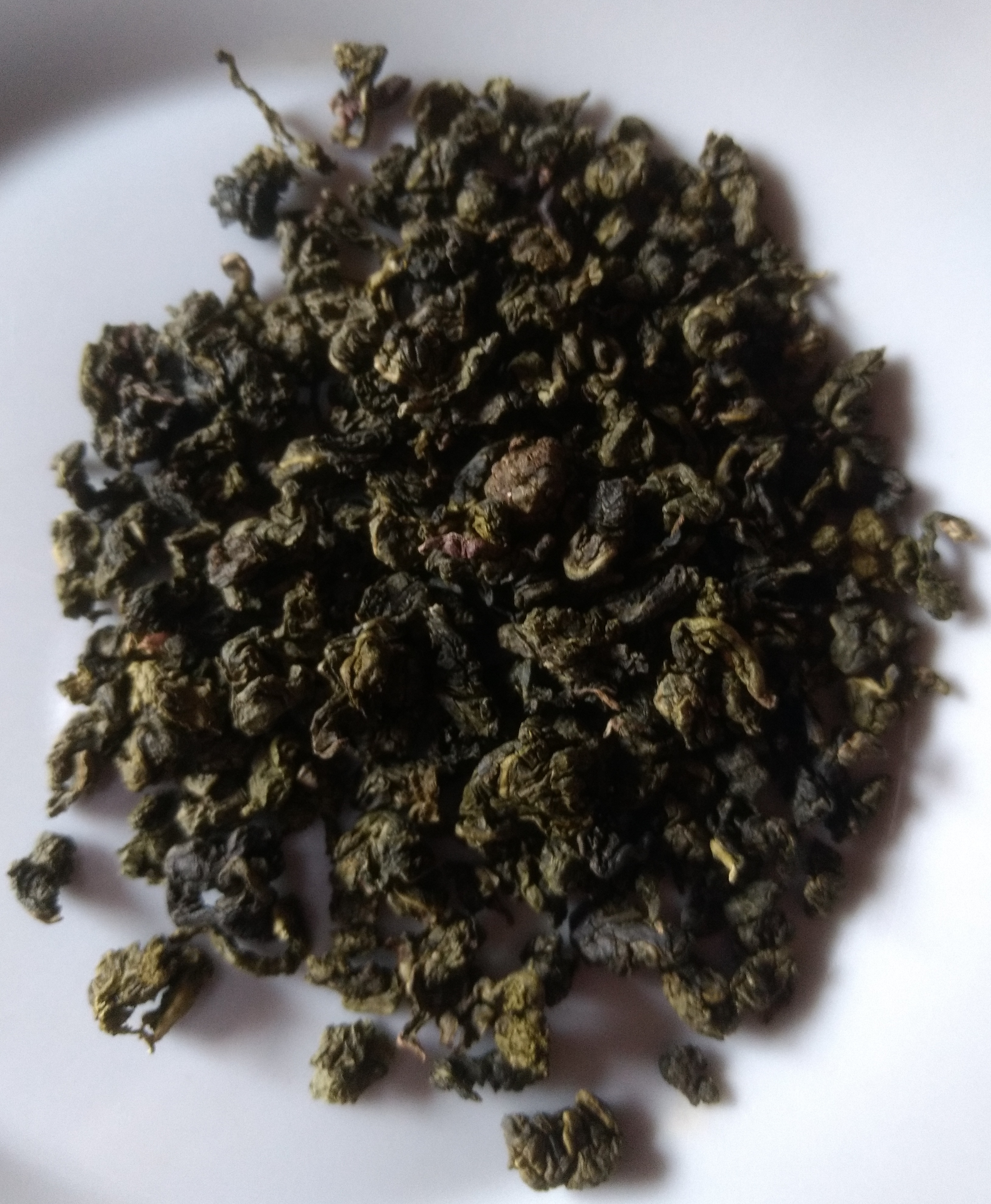
Tieguanyin leaves

- Summer Tieguanyin is harvested in summer and is considered lower quality.

== Types ==
Based on the different roasting methods and locations, there are various types of Tieguanyin.

- Anxi Tieguanyin Tea (安溪鉄観音) – Recently, this oolong is typically close to a green tea, with only a little oxidation. With a very flowery and fresh delicate aroma character, the tea liquid is golden yellow. In the past, the tea was traditionally more heavily roasted.
- Muzha Tieguanyin Tea (木柵鐵觀音) – This traditional oolong is roasted and has a stronger taste and with roast nutty character; the tea liquid is reddish brown.

In Taiwan, the name Tieguanyin is sometimes used to describe also oolong teas of other tea plant varieties.

== See also ==
- List of Chinese teas
