= Huang Meigui tea =

Chinese oolong tea

Huang Meigui
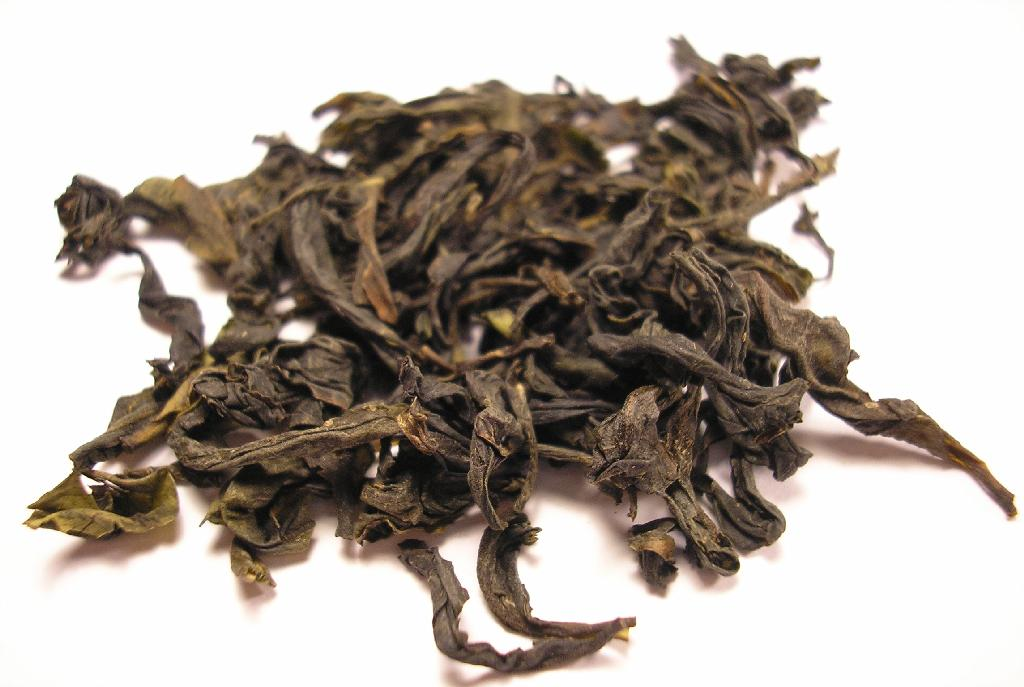
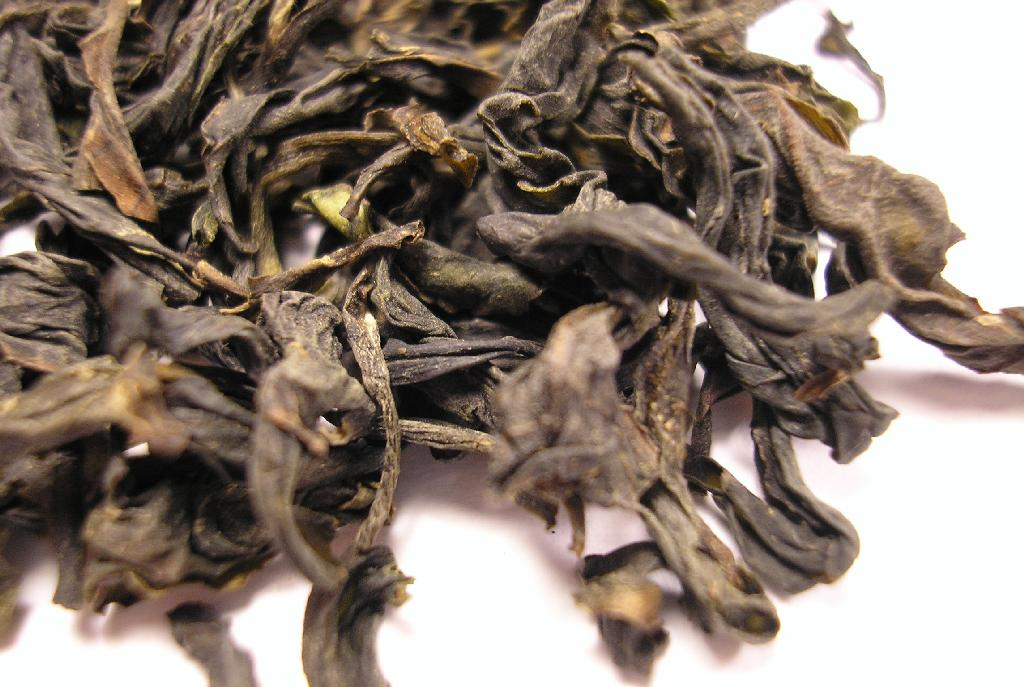
- Type: Oolong
- Other names: Yellow Rose
- Origin: Wuyi Mountains, Fujian Province, China
- Quick description: New cultivar

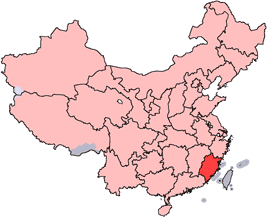
Huang Meigui tea is grown in Fujian province, China.

Huang Meigui (Chinese: 黃玫瑰; pinyin: huáng méiguī; pronounced [xwǎŋ měɪ.kwéɪ]) is a relatively new Wuyi oolong tea, developed c. 2002. It has a highly aromatic fragrance and a lighter floral taste than most other Wuyi oolongs.

The colour of the steeped leaves is a very light green, much greener than other Wuyi teas.
