= Teaghrelins =

Chemical structure of teaghrelin-1

Teaghrelins are acylated flavonoid tetraglycosides found in semi-oxidized oolong teas (Camellia sinensis), such as Chin-shin oolong tea and Shy‐jih‐chuen oolong tea.

Teaghrelins are ghrelin receptor agonists in vitro. In an animal model, teaghrelins induce hunger and accelerate gastric emptying. Teaghrelins also has growth hormone releasing activity on the anterior pituitary gland, similar to the synthetic ghrelin analog GHRP-6, that could be inhibited by a ghrelin receptor antagonist.
