= Oolong =

Partially oxidized Chinese tea

Oolong tea
- "Oolong" in Traditional (top) and Simplified (bottom) Chinese characters
- Traditional Chinese: 烏龍茶
- Simplified Chinese: 乌龙茶
- Literal meaning: "Dark dragon tea"
Transcriptions
Standard Mandarin
- Hanyu Pinyin: wūlóng chá
- Bopomofo: ㄨ ㄌㄨㄥˊ ㄔㄚˊ
- Wade–Giles: wu^{1}-lung^{2} ch'a^{2}
- IPA: [ú.lʊ̌ŋ ʈʂʰǎ]
Yue: Cantonese
- Yale Romanization: wū-lùhng chàah
- Jyutping: wu1-lung4 caa4
- IPA: [wu˥ lʊŋ˩ tsʰa˩]
Southern Min
- Hokkien POJ: O͘-liông tê

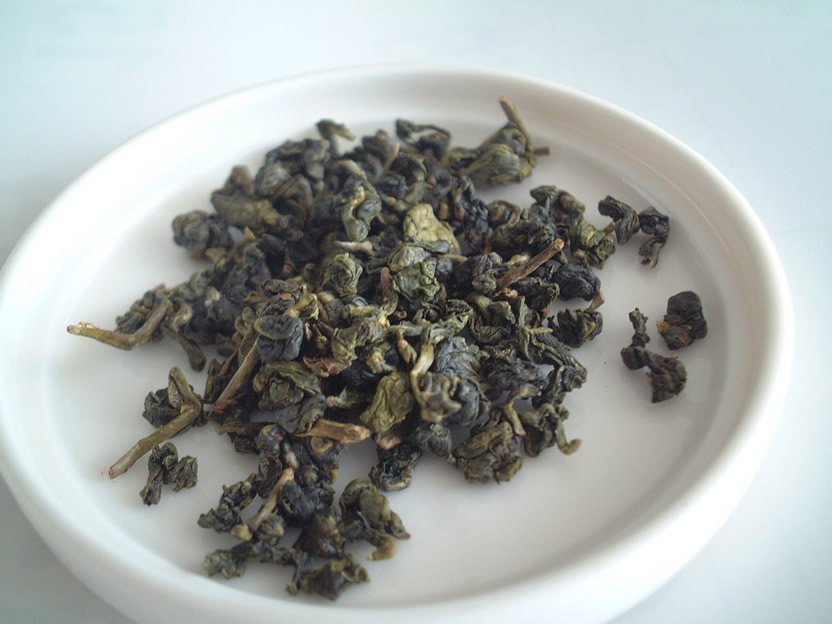
Oolong tea leaves

Oolong (UK: /ˈuːlɒŋ/, US: /-lɔːŋ/; simplified Chinese: 乌龙茶; traditional Chinese: 烏龍茶; pinyin: wūlóngchá; Jyutping: wu1lung4 caa4; Pe̍h-ōe-jī: o͘-liông tê, 'black dragon' tea) is a traditional semi-oxidized Chinese tea (Camellia sinensis) produced through a process that includes withering the leaves under strong sun and allowing some oxidation to occur before curling and twisting. Most oolong teas, especially those of fine quality, involve unique tea plant cultivars that are exclusively used for particular varieties. The degree of oxidation, which is controlled by the length of time between picking and final drying, can range from 8% to 85% depending on the variety and production style. Oolong is especially popular in southeastern China and among ethnic Chinese in Southeast Asia, as is the Fujian preparation process known as the gongfu tea ceremony.

Different styles of oolong tea can vary widely in flavor. They can be sweet and fruity with honey aromas, woody and thick with roasted aromas, or green and fresh with complex aromas, all depending on the horticulture and style of production. Several types of oolong tea, including those produced in the Wuyi Mountains, Nanping of northern Fujian, such as Da Hong Pao, are among the most famous Chinese teas. Different varieties of oolong are processed differently, but the leaves are usually formed into one of two distinct styles. Some are rolled into long curly leaves, while others are "wrap-curled" into small beads, each with a tail. The former style is the more traditional.

The Chinese term wulong (oolong) was first used to describe a tea in the 1857 text Miscellaneous Notes on Fujian by Shi Hongbao. In Taiwan, oolong teas are also known as qingcha (Chinese: 青茶; pinyin: qīngchá; Pe̍h-ōe-jī: chheⁿ-tê) or "dark green teas" since early 2000. The term "blue tea" (French: thé bleu) in French is used to refer to oolong tea. Oolong teas share some characteristics with both green and black teas – they have light flavour notes but are often more complex in taste than green teas, and not as strong as black teas.

The manufacturing of oolong tea involves repeating stages to achieve the desired amount of bruising and browning of leaves. Withering, rolling, shaping, and firing are similar to the process for black tea, but much more attention to timing and temperature is necessary.

== Etymology ==
There is no universally agreed upon explanation of the origin of the name of Oolong tea. Oolong tea may have originated from Dragon-Phoenix Tea Cake tribute tea. The name oolong tea replaced the old title when loose tea came into fashion; as it was dark, long, and curly, it was called "Black Dragon" tea, leading to the Oolong name.

== Varieties ==
=== Fujian ===
Tea production in Fujian is concentrated in two regions: the Wuyi Mountains and Anxi County, Quanzhou. Both are major historical centers of oolong tea production in China.

==== Wuyi Mountains ====
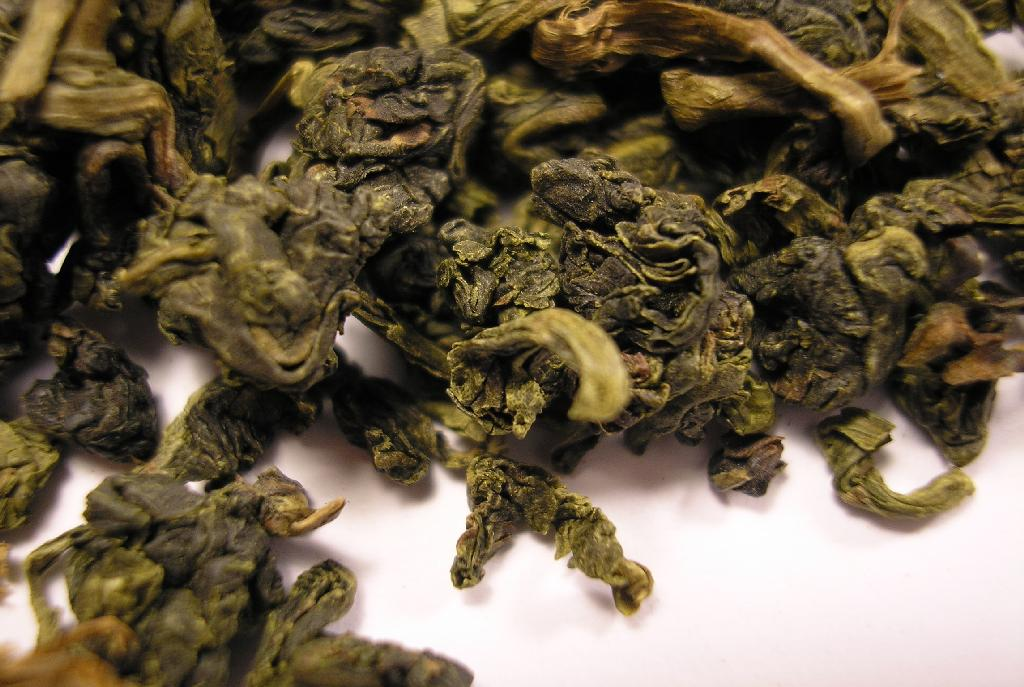
Wuyi Huang Guan Yin tea leaves

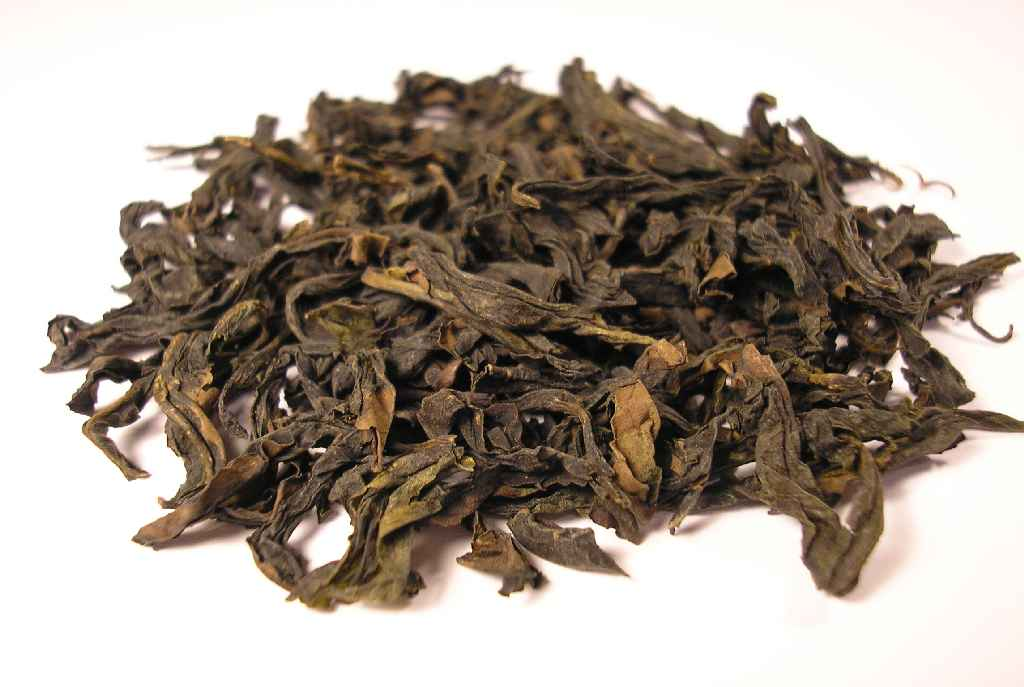
Wuyi Qi Lan Oolong tea leaves

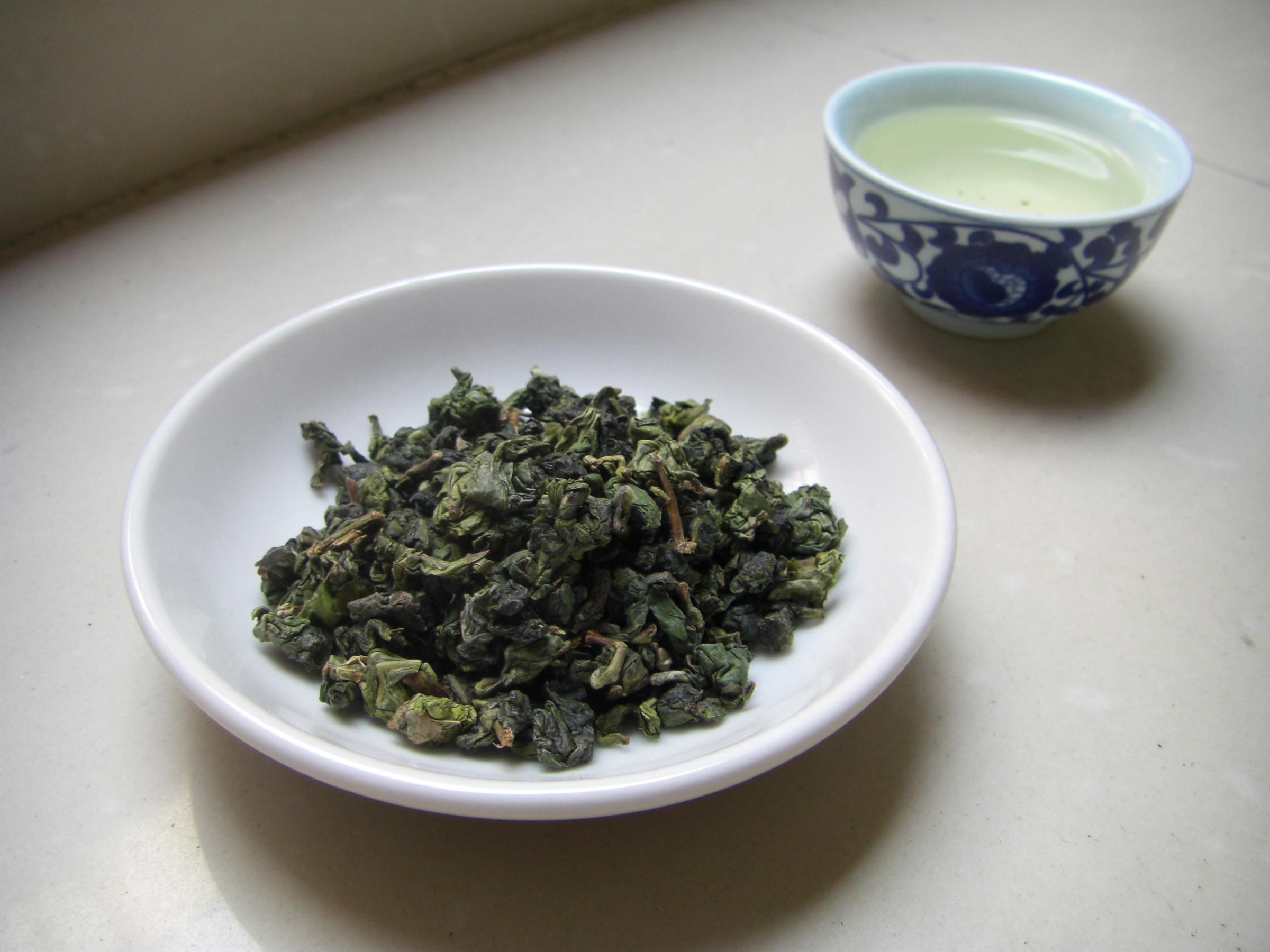
Tieguanyin

The most famous and expensive oolong teas are made here, and the production is still usually accredited as being organic. Some of the better known cliff teas are:

- Da Hong Pao ("Big Red Robe"): a highly prized tea and a Si Da Ming Cong tea. This tea is also one of the two oolong varieties classed as a famous Chinese tea.
- Shui Jin Gui ("Golden Water Turtle"): a Si Da Ming Cong tea.
- Tieluohan ("Iron Arhat"): a Si Da Ming Cong tea.
- Bai Jiguan ("White Cockscomb"): a Si Da Ming Cong tea. A light tea with light, yellowish leaves.
- Rougui ("Cassia"): a dark tea with a spicy aroma.
- Shui Xian ("Narcissus"): a very dark tea. Much of it is grown elsewhere in Fujian.

==== Anxi ====
- Tieguanyin ("Iron Goddess of Mercy"): one of the Ten Famous Chinese Teas.
- Huangjin Gui ("Golden Cassia" or "Golden Osmanthus"): similar to Tieguanyin, with a very fragrant flavor.

=== Guangdong ===
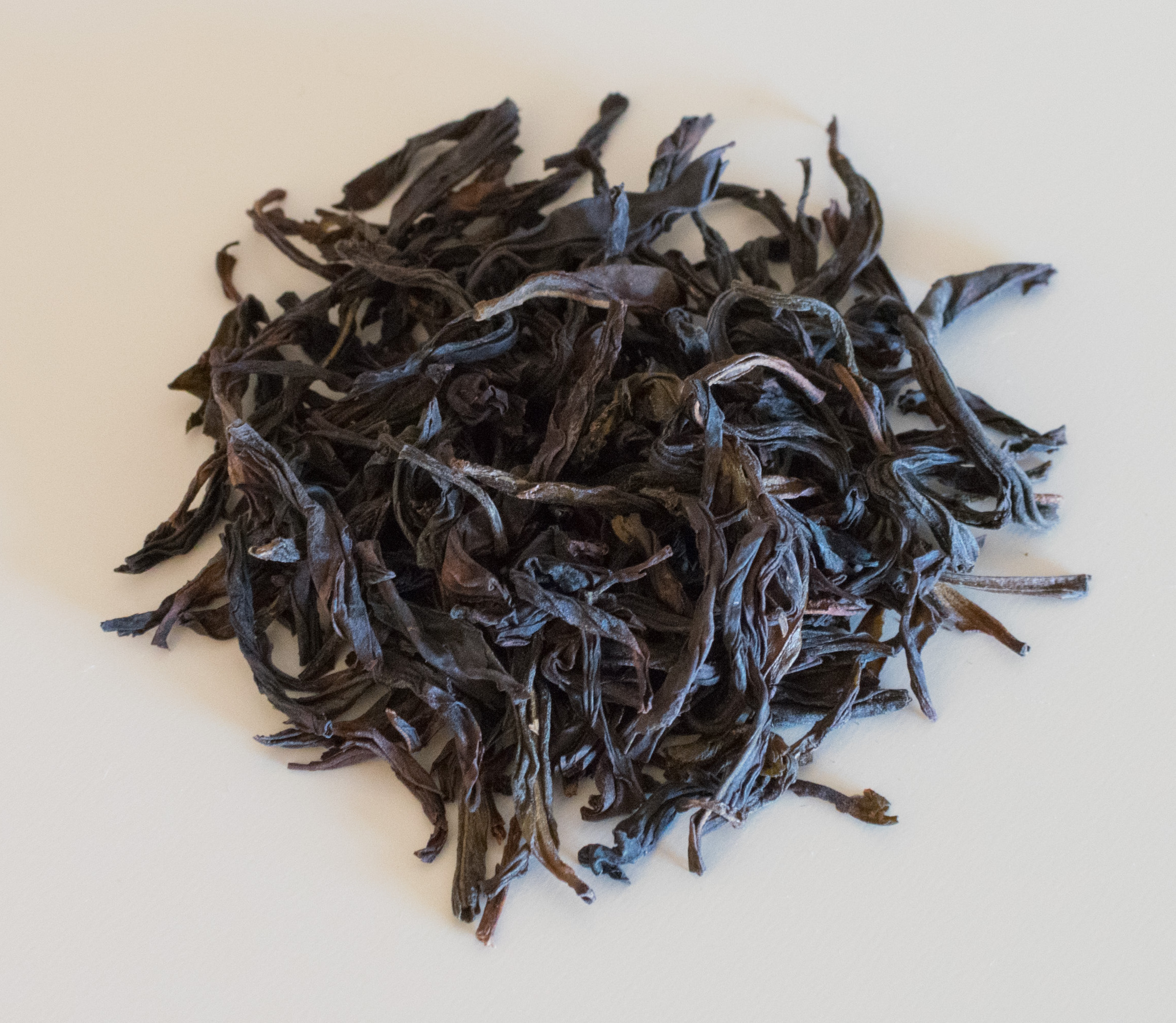
Mi Lan Xiang dancong tea

Single Bush Dancong (单 枞) ("Phoenix oolong")

Dancong tea refers to a family of strip-style oolong teas from Guangdong Province. They are noted for their ability to naturally imitate the flavors and fragrances of various flowers and fruits, such as orange blossom, orchid, grapefruit, almond, ginger flower, etc.

The term dancong originally meant phoenix teas all picked from one tree. In recent times, though, it has become a generic term for all Phoenix Mountain oolongs. True dancongs are still produced, but are not common outside China.

=== Taiwan ===
Tea cultivation in Taiwan began in the 18th century. Since then, many of the teas which are grown in Fujian province have also been grown in Taiwan. Since the 1970s, the tea industry in Taiwan has expanded at a rapid rate, in line with the rest of the economy. Due to high domestic demand and a strong tea culture, most Taiwanese tea is bought and consumed in Taiwan.

As the weather in Taiwan is highly variable, tea quality may differ from season to season. Although the island is not particularly large, it is geographically varied, with high, steep mountains rising abruptly from low-lying coastal plains. The different weather patterns, temperatures, altitudes, and soil ultimately result in differences in the appearance, aroma, and flavour of the tea grown in Taiwan. In some mountainous areas, teas have been cultivated at ever higher elevations to produce a unique, sweet taste that fetches a premium price.

- Dong Ding ("Frozen Summit" or "Ice Peak"): Named after the mountain in Nantou County, Central Taiwan, where it is grown. This is a tightly rolled tea with a light, distinctive fragrance.
- Dongfang meiren ("Oriental Beauty"): This type of tea exhibits very potent aromatics because of increased levels of terpenes. This is due to the processing of the leaf as well as the tea plants being attacked by the Jassid ("Leaf Hopper") insect, before picking. The tea is picked in summer at lower elevations because this is the environment most likely to attract these types of insects.
- Alishan oolong: Grown in the Alishan area of Chiayi County, this tea has large rolled leaves that have a purple-green appearance when dry. It is grown at an elevation of 1,000 to 1,400 m (3,300 to 4,600 ft). There is only a short period during the growing season when the sun is strong, which results in a sweeter and less astringent brew. It produces golden yellow tea with a unique fruity aroma.
- Lishan (梨山) oolong: Grown near Lishan mountain in the north-central region of Taiwan, this tea is very similar in appearance to Alishan teas. It is grown at an elevation above 1,600 m (5,200 ft), with Dayuling, and Fushou being the well known regions and teas along Lishan.
- Baozhong: the least oxidized of the oolong teas from Taiwan, with unrolled leaves of a light green to brown color. Originally grown in Fujian, it is now also widely cultivated and produced in Pinglin Township near Taipei.
- Ruan zhi: a light variety of oolong tea. The tea is also known as Qingxin and as # 17. It originates from Anxi in Fujian province.
- Jin Xuan: a variety of oolong tea developed in 1980. The tea is also known as "Milk Oolong" (Nai Xiang) because of its creamy, smooth, and easy taste. Traditional milk oolong tea does not contain milk. It originates from Taiwan.
- Black Oolong: may refer to a dark roasted oolong. This will have a roasted flavor similar to dark roast coffee.
- High-mountain or gaoshan: refers to several varieties of oolong tea grown in the mountains of central Taiwan. Includes varieties such as Alishan, Wu She, Li Shan and Yu Shan.
- Tieguanyin: Muzha Tea Co. brought the tea from Anxi County and developed Taiwan's own variation of the popular tea on the hills of Muzha area near Taipei. While the techniques they used were similar to Anxi tieguanyin, the tastes have evolved during over a century of development.
- Sijichun Oolong: Also known as Four Seasons Oolong Tea, a beloved and popular choice in Taiwan. Originating in Maokong, Mucha, Taipei, this tea is renowned for its year-round harvest, allowing it to be cultivated across Taiwan.

=== Other varieties ===
- Darjeeling oolong: Darjeeling tea made according to Chinese methods.
- Assam smoked oolong: Assam's tea made according to Chinese methods, and smoked over open fire.
- Japanese oolongs: Japan has traditionally focused on Green tea, but more recently, there have been new developments in Japanese oolong production, though this remains a minor part of the Japanese tea market.
- Vietnamese oolongs: While Vietnam is more known for its green tea, they also produce oolongs.
- Apart from varieties based on origin of cultivation, new age specialty tea companies have started offering infused oolong teas.

== Preparation ==
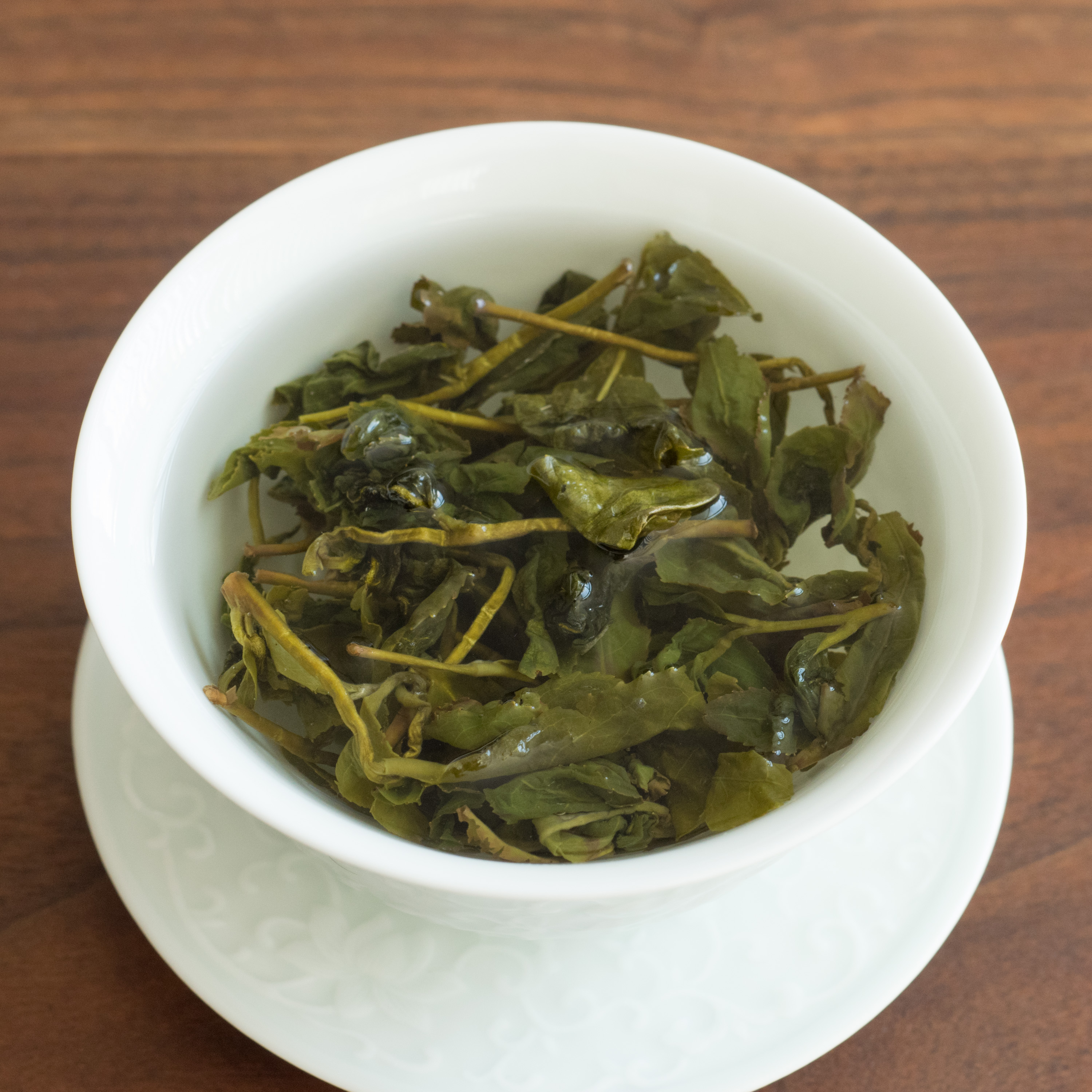
Jin Xuan tea steeping in a porcelain gaiwan

Recommended brewing techniques for oolong tea vary widely. One common method is to use a small steeping vessel, such as a gaiwan or Yixing clay teapot, with a higher than usual leaf to water ratio. Such vessels are used in the gongfu method of tea preparation, which involves multiple short steepings.

For a single infusion, 1- to 5-minute steepings are recommended, depending on personal preference. The recommended water temperature ranges from 80–95 °C (180–205 °F).

== Characteristics ==
=== Caffeine ===
Oolong contains caffeine, although the caffeine content in tea will vary based on terroir, when the leaf is plucked, and the production processes.

=== Teaghrelins ===
Some semi-oxidized oolong teas contain acylated flavonoid tetraglycosides, named teaghrelins due to their ability to bind to ghrelin receptors. Teaghrelins were isolated from Chin-shin oolong tea and Shy‐jih‐chuen oolong tea and recently from other oolong tea varieties.

== See also ==
- Chinese tea culture
- List of Chinese teas
- Teochew cuisine
