= Dong Ding tea =

Taiwanese branch of Oolong tea

Dong Ding
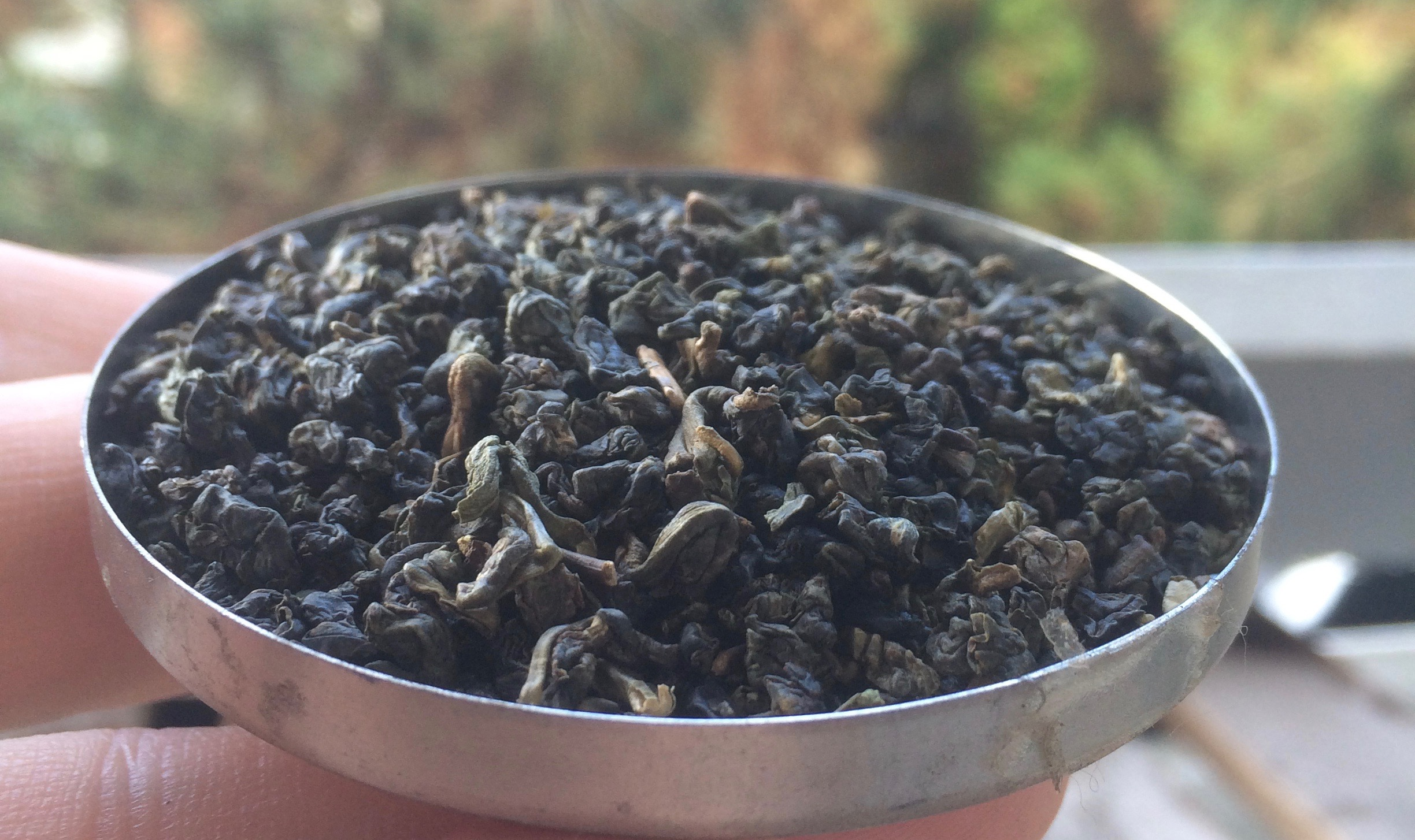
- Type: Oolong
- Other names: Tung-ting
- Origin: Nantou, Taiwan
- Quick description: Taiwanese oolong

Dong Ding (Chinese: 凍頂; pinyin: Dòng Dǐng; pronounced [tʊ̂ŋ.tìŋ]), also spelled Tung-ting, is an oolong tea from Taiwan. A translation of Dong Ding is "Frozen Summit" or "Icy Peak", and is the name of the mountain in Taiwan where the tea is cultivated. Those plants were brought to Taiwan from the Wuyi Mountains in China's Fujian Province about 150 years ago.

== Origin ==
The Qingxin variety was brought from the Chinese city of Wuyi to Dong Ding Mountain about 150 years ago. According to reports, the scholar Ling Fong Chi, while studying in Fujian, brought tea plants to the Meadow as souvenirs for his relatives. The climatic conditions at Dong Ding, including sunny days and foggy afternoons, proved to be ideal for growing tea, which contributed to the rapid popularity of this variety in Taiwan.

Similar to Darjeeling or Pu-erh tea, the name Dong Ding originally meant that this tea was grown only on the mountain of the same name. However, as the popularity of this tea spread, producers began to grow it in other parts of Taiwan, while maintaining the processing style characteristic of Dong Ding. Therefore, you can now find Dong Ding tea that does not come from Dong Ding Mountain. It is important to pay attention to the labels on the packaging to find out where the tea was grown.
