= Tea processing =

Method of processing tea leaves into dried leaves for brewing tea

Tea leaf processing methods for the six most common types of tea

Tea processing is the method in which the leaves from the tea plant Camellia sinensis are transformed into the dried leaves for brewing tea.

The categories of tea are distinguished by the processing they undergo. In its most general form, tea processing involves different manners and degrees of oxidation of the leaves, stopping the oxidation, forming the tea and drying it.

The innate flavor of the dried tea leaves is determined by the type of cultivar of the tea bush, the quality of the plucked tea leaves, and the manner and quality of the production processing they undergo. After processing, a tea may be blended with other teas or mixed with flavourants to alter the flavor of the final tea. When producing black, pu'erh and oolong teas there is an additional purpose of processing: to encourage oxidization, which further develops flavour and aroma compounds.

== History ==
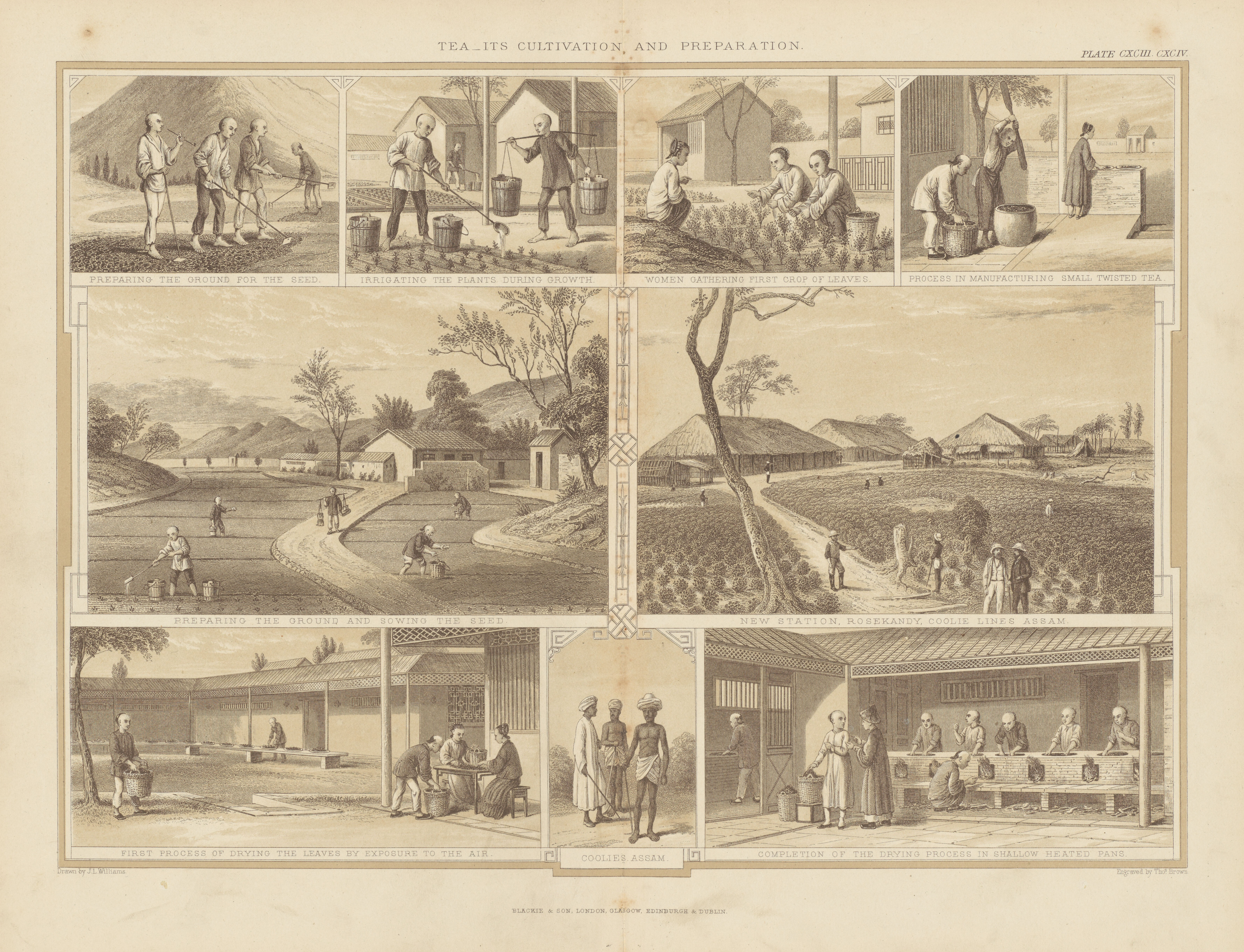
An 1850 British engraving showing tea cultivation and tea leaf processing.

The history of tea processing corresponds intimately with the role that tea played in Chinese society and the preferred methods of its consumption in ancient Chinese society. The domestication of tea and the development of its processing method likely began in the area around what is now Southwest China, Indo-Burma, and Tibet. Variations of these processing techniques are still used in modern tea processing albeit being far more mechanized.

=== Green ===
Ancient Chinese society first encountered the tea plant in what is now south-eastern China and processed it as an additional medicinal herb for use in Chinese herbology. The processing technique used to process fresh tea leaves was to immediately steam the fresh tea leaves and dry them for preservation, which is the most ancient Chinese form of tea leaf processing known to date. This processing method was perfected near the end of the Han dynasty (206 BCE – 220 CE) and produced a dried tea that would be classified today as green tea and quite similar to modern Japanese sencha. For consumption, dried tea leaves were either decocted with water and other herbs, or ground into a powder to be taken straight, or suspended in a liquid in the manner of matcha.

With the increase of tea's use in Chinese herbology, production methods changed, where the processed green tea leaves were not immediately dried after steaming. Rather the steamed tea leaves were first pulverized into a paste form, with the paste then formed in molds and slowly dried into brick tea, a technique well described by Lu Yu in his work The Classic of Tea. Tender leaves and leaf buds were generally not used, as older mature tea leaves were preferred for tea production. Some tea bricks were also produced from mature whole leaves, which typically required the use of a cooked rice slurry (米湯) to bind the tea brick together. The preference of producing tea in brick form possibly stems from the fact that it can be more easily transported and stored.

=== Yellow and fermented ===
The use of steam in fixation (殺青) of tea leaf enzymes is an important step in processing tea, with the leaves quickly cooled down and then undergoing further processing. The less tightly controlled methods of it in the past resulted in the creation of yellow tea when the tea leaves were over-steamed for fixation or were not quickly spread out, doused with water and cooled. Although green tea was the most popular in Lu Yu's time, he personally considered yellow tea to be superior to green.

Even when the leaves were quickly cooled, if they are left in piles (渥堆) for too long before processing, the leaves will begin to undergo microbial fermentation to produce post-fermented tea. This technique is somewhat similar to composting, albeit tightly controlled, and still used in the production of Liu'an tea (安徽六安籃茶) and was more recently introduced for the production of the ripe type Pu-erh tea. The production of tea in brick forms and their storage also resulted in another type of post-fermented tea, which was produced by aging. The long transport and storage times of the day unwittingly allowed the tea bricks to undergo prolonged exposure to the elements and to various microflora, which resulted in the aging, oxidation, and fermentation of green brick teas. A brick of green tea that had been stored and aged into post-fermented tea was charred over charcoal to rid it of the layer of detritus, dust, and shiny multicoloured growths before being broken down into a powder, cooked, and then consumed. By the end of the Tang dynasty (618–907 CE) green, yellow, and post-fermented tea was commonly used in China and moved from purely being used in herbology to becoming a beverage drunk for pleasure.

=== Oolong and white ===
The Tang dynasty was also the period when oolong tea was first developed in the Fujian province. It was originally produced in thin brick form, known then under the name Beiyuan tea (北苑茶). The importance of the withering process for producing oolong tea was described by poet Huang Furen (皇甫冉) in his poem "送陸鴻漸棲霞寺采茶", which indicated that the processing of tea leaves is not a simple task, requiring the scaling of steep cliffs to pick the choicest leaves and the withering of the leaves under the sun and warm winds ("采茶非采菉，遠遠上層崖。布葉春風暖，盈筐白日斜...").

White tea (白茶) was also developed in the Fujian province with its first mentions in the Song dynasty document Treatise on Tea, where the delicate buds used for producing white tea, the difficulty in producing it, its taste, and its rarity were lauded. The production method of white tea was described by Ming dynasty author Tian Yiheng (田艺蘅) in "Zhuquan Xiaopin" (煮泉小品) (produced in the 33rd year of the Jiajing Emperor) regarding Fuding white tea (福鼎白茶). In this work, he stated that tea buds that have undergone fixation by panning over flames (as with green tea) are second to white tea that was simply allowed to dry under the sun, since it's more natural in taste and lacks flavours imparted by the smoke and flames. ("芽茶以火作者为次，生晒者为上, 亦更近自然，且断烟火气耳")

=== Black ===
The technique for producing black tea was first developed during the late Ming dynasty in Wuyishan, Fujian, either resulting from the over-oxidation of tea-leaves during the manufacture of oolong tea or indirectly from the methods of manufacturing green and white teas. In the early 1600s, tea producers in the Wuyi Mountains began kneading the sun-withered tea leaves to macerate them, then allowed them to dry under the sun, thus reaching full oxidation and producing Gongfu black tea (工夫紅茶). When there was insufficient sun and temperatures were low, the withered leaves would be processed indoors in warmed rooms and allowed to fully oxidize, then smoked dry over pine fires thus producing lapsang souchong. According to oral traditions of the region, the discovery of Lapsang Souchong processing was due to military troops passing through a Wuyishan tea factory during the last years of the Ming dynasty, causing delays to tea leaf processing thus resulting in a completely oxidized leaf that the producer salvaged by drying over a fire built from pine branches. By the Qing dynasty, both Lapsang Souchong and Gongfu black tea were well recognized in China and noted in "Records on Yiwu mountain" (武夷山志) by the scholar Dong Tiangong (董天工).

== Procedure ==
=== General ===
Although each type of tea has a different taste, smell, and visual appearance, tea processing for all tea types consists of a very similar set of methods with only minor variations. Without careful moisture and temperature control during its manufacture and life thereafter, fungi will grow on tea. This fungus causes fermentation that will contaminate the tea and may render it unfit for consumption.

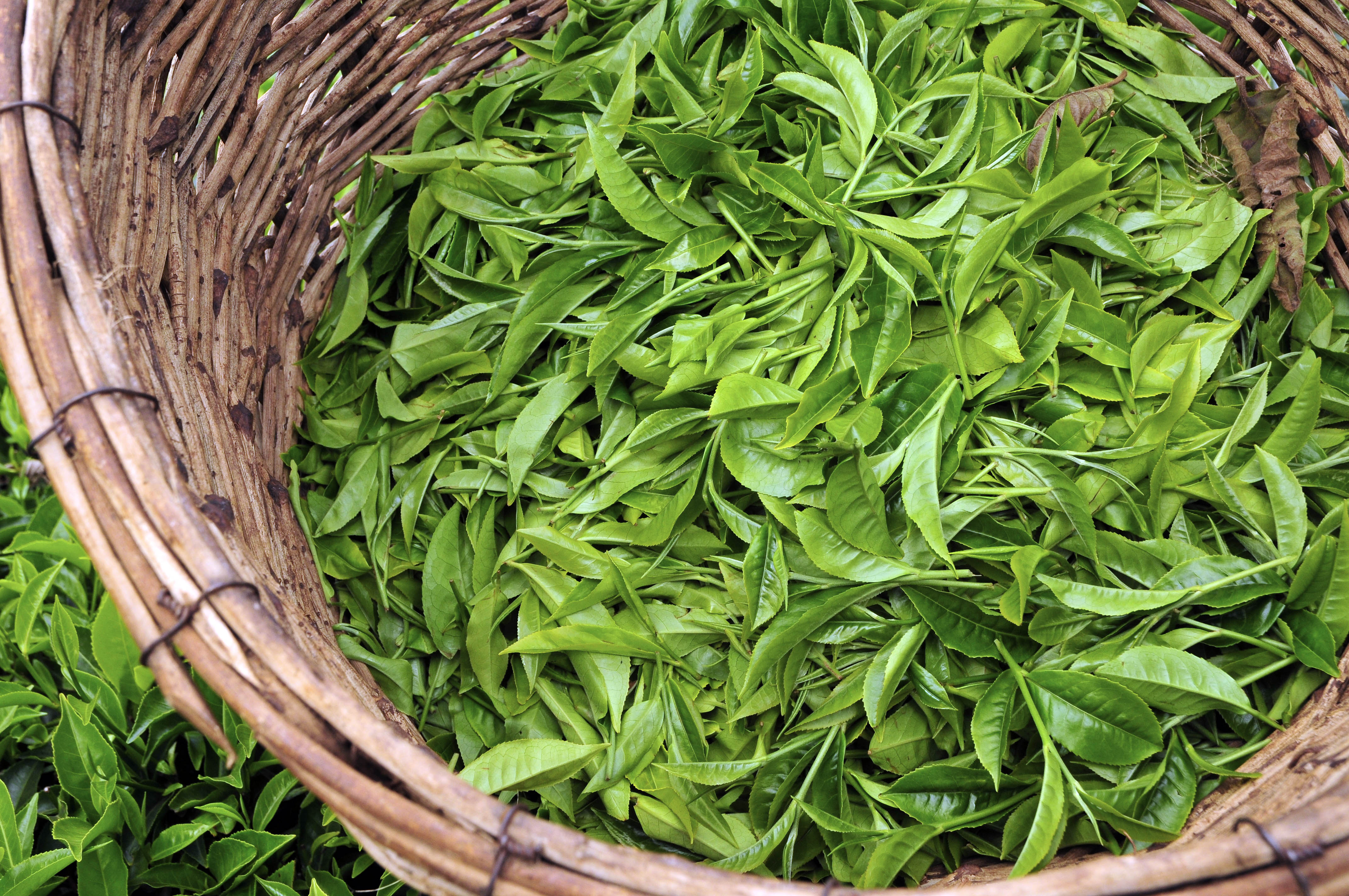
Freshly picked tea leaves on a tea farm in Kenya.

1. Plucking: Tea leaves and flushes, which includes a terminal bud and two young leaves, are picked from Camellia sinensis bushes typically twice a year during early spring and early summer or late spring. Autumn or winter pickings of tea flushes are much less common, though they occur when climate permits. Picking is done by hand when a higher quality tea is needed, or where labour costs are not prohibitive. Depending on the skill of the picker, hand-picking is performed by pulling the flush with a snap of the forearm, arm, or shoulders, with the picker grasping the tea shoot using the thumb and forefinger, with the middle finger sometimes used in combination. Tea flushes and leaves can also be picked by machine, though there will be more broken leaves and partial flushes, reducing the quality of the tea. However, it has also been shown that machine plucking in correctly timed harvesting periods can produce good leaves for the production of high quality teas.
2. Withering / wilting: The tea leaves will begin to wilt soon after picking, with a gradual onset of enzymatic oxidation. Withering is used to remove excess water from the leaves and allows a very slight amount of oxidation. The leaves can be either put under the sun or left in a cool breezy room to pull moisture out from the leaves. In a withering room, leaves are spread out along troughs for 8–14 hours, usually overnight. During this time 35% of moisture is lost. The appropriate conditions for withering, such as temperature and relative humidity, are not readily defined in literature as it can vary depending on climate, producing region and type of process used. However, variations in the rate of withering, such as a hard or soft wither, has been shown to influence flavor compounds. The leaves sometimes lose more than a quarter of their weight in water during withering. The process is also important in promoting the breakdown of leaf proteins into free amino acids and increases the availability of freed caffeine, both of which change the taste of the tea.
3. Disruption: Known in the Western tea industry as disruption or leaf maceration, the teas are bruised or torn in order to promote and quicken oxidation. The leaves may be lightly bruised on their edges by shaking and tossing in a bamboo tray or tumbling in baskets. More extensive leaf disruption can be done by kneading, rolling, tearing, and crushing, usually by machinery. The bruising breaks down the structures inside and outside of the leaf cells and allows the co-mingling of oxidative enzymes with various substrates, which allows for the beginning of oxidation. This also releases some of the leaf juices, which may aid in oxidation and change the taste profile of the tea.
4. Oxidation: For teas that require oxidation, the leaves are left on their own in a climate-controlled room where they turn progressively darker. This is accompanied by agitation in some cases. In this process the chlorophyll in the leaves is enzymatically broken down, and tannins in tea are released or transformed. The tea producer may choose when the oxidation should be stopped, which depends on the desired qualities in the final tea as well as the weather conditions (heat and humidity). For light oolong teas this may be anywhere from 5–40% oxidation, in darker oolong teas 60–70%, and in black teas 100% oxidation. Oxidation is highly important in the formation of many taste and aroma compounds, which give tea its liquor colour, strength, and briskness. Depending on the type of tea desired, under or over-oxidation can result in grassy flavours, or overly thick winey flavours. This process is sometimes referred to erroneously as fermentation in the tea industry.
5. Fixation / kill-green: Kill-green or shāqīng (殺青) is done to stop the tea leaf oxidation at a desired level. This process is accomplished by moderately heating tea leaves, thus deactivating their oxidative enzymes and removing unwanted scents in the leaves, without damaging the flavour of the tea. Traditionally, the tea leaves are panned in a wok or steamed, but with advancements in technology, kill-green is sometimes done by baking or panning in a rolling drum. In some white teas and some black teas such as CTC blacks, kill-green is done simultaneously with drying.
6. Sweltering / yellowing: Unique to yellow teas, warm and damp tea leaves from after kill-green are lightly heated in a closed container, which causes the previously green leaves to turn yellow. The resulting leaves produce a beverage that has a distinctive yellowish-green hue due to transformations of the leaf chlorophyll. Through being sweltered for 6–8 hours at close to human body temperatures, the amino acids and polyphenols in the processed tea leaves undergo chemical changes to give this tea its distinct briskness and mellow taste.
7. Rolling / shaping: The damp tea leaves are then rolled to be formed into wrinkled strips, by hand or using a rolling machine which causes the tea to wrap around itself. The most commonly used rolling machines are big, circular rotators that press the leaves between two grooved wooden plates which tear, squeeze and bruise the leaves. The roller machines can process up to 25 kg at a time. This rolling action also causes some of the sap, essential oils, and juices inside the leaves to ooze out, which further enhances the taste of the tea. The strips of tea can then be formed into other shapes, such as being rolled into spirals, kneaded and rolled into pellets, or tied into balls, cones, and other elaborate shapes. In many types of oolong, the rolled strips of tea leaf are then rolled into spheres or half spheres. This is typically done by placing the damp leaves in large cloth bags, which are then kneaded by hand or machine in a specific manner. The tea can also be pressed into bricks through the use of heavy stones or presses.
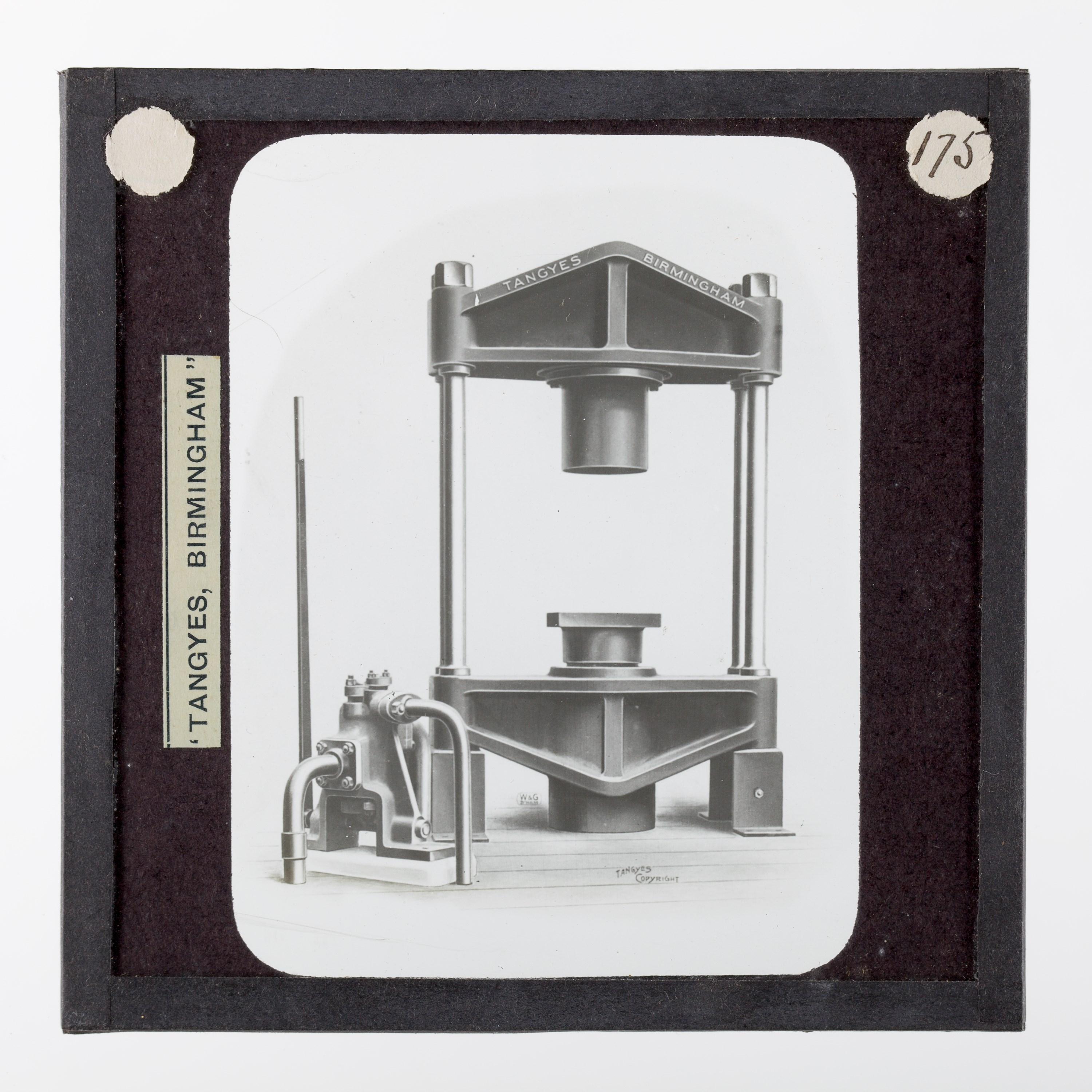
  Glass lantern slide, circa 1910, showing a Tangye hydraulic tea press of the type supplied to Cheerkoff, Panoff & Co. of Hankow, China for pressing dried tea leaves into flat 2 1/2-pound cakes for shipping to Asiatic Russia.
8. Drying: Drying is done to finish the tea for sale. This can be done in a myriad of ways including panning, sunning, air drying, or baking. Baking is usually the most common. Great care must be taken to not over-cook the leaves. The drying of the produced tea is responsible for many new flavour compounds particularly important in green teas.
9. Aging / curing: While not always required, some teas require additional aging, fermentation, or baking to reach their drinking potential. For instance, a green tea puerh, prior to curing into a post-fermented tea, is often bitter and harsh in taste, but becomes sweet and mellow through fermentation by age or dampness. Additionally, oolong can benefit from aging if fired over charcoal. Flavoured teas are manufactured in this stage by spraying the tea with aromas and flavours or by storing them with their flavorants.
10. Sorting: Tea sorting can help remove physical impurities, such as stems and seeds. Using sorting equipment to improve tea production efficiency is very common in tea processing plants, especially in black tea processing. A color sorter may also be used to classify final product grades according to color and shape.

Pan-roasting Fixation
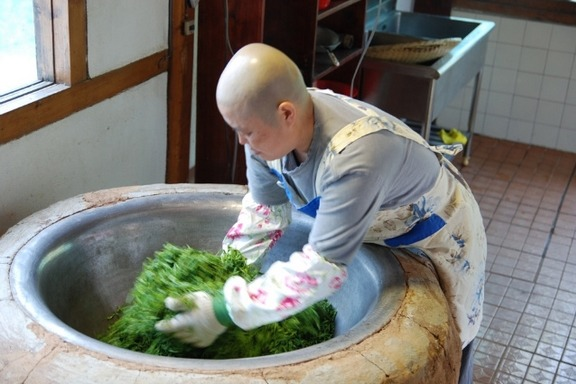
- A Korean bhikkhuni pan roasting tea leaves for fixation

Chinese name
- Traditional Chinese: 麩炒茶
Transcriptions
Middle Chinese
- Middle Chinese: pʰɨo.t͡ʃʰˠauX.ɖˠa
Old Chinese
- Zhengzhang: *pʰa.sʰroːʔ.rlaː

Korean name
- Hangul: 덖음차; 부초차
- Hanja: 덖음茶; 麩炒茶
Transcriptions
- Revised Romanization: deokkeumcha; buchocha
- McCune–Reischauer: tŏkkŭmch'a; puch'och'a

Steam Fixation
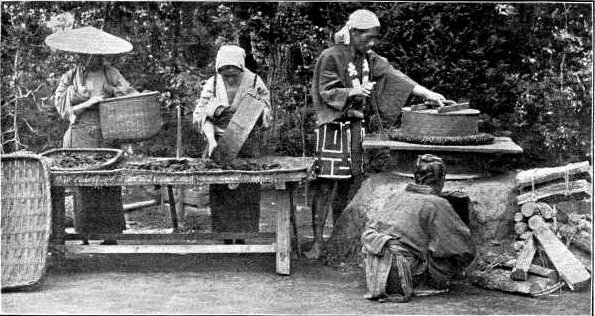
- Steaming tea leaves for fixation

Chinese name
- Traditional Chinese: 蒸製茶
Transcriptions
Middle Chinese
- Middle Chinese: t͡ɕɨŋ.t͡ɕiᴇi.ɖˠa
Old Chinese
- Zhengzhang: *kljɯŋ.kjeds.rlaː

Korean name
- Hangul: 찐차; 증제차
- Hanja: 찐茶; 蒸製茶
Transcriptions
- Revised Romanization: jjincha; jeungjecha
- McCune–Reischauer: tchinch'a; chŭngjech'a

Scenes of and equipment for tea processing
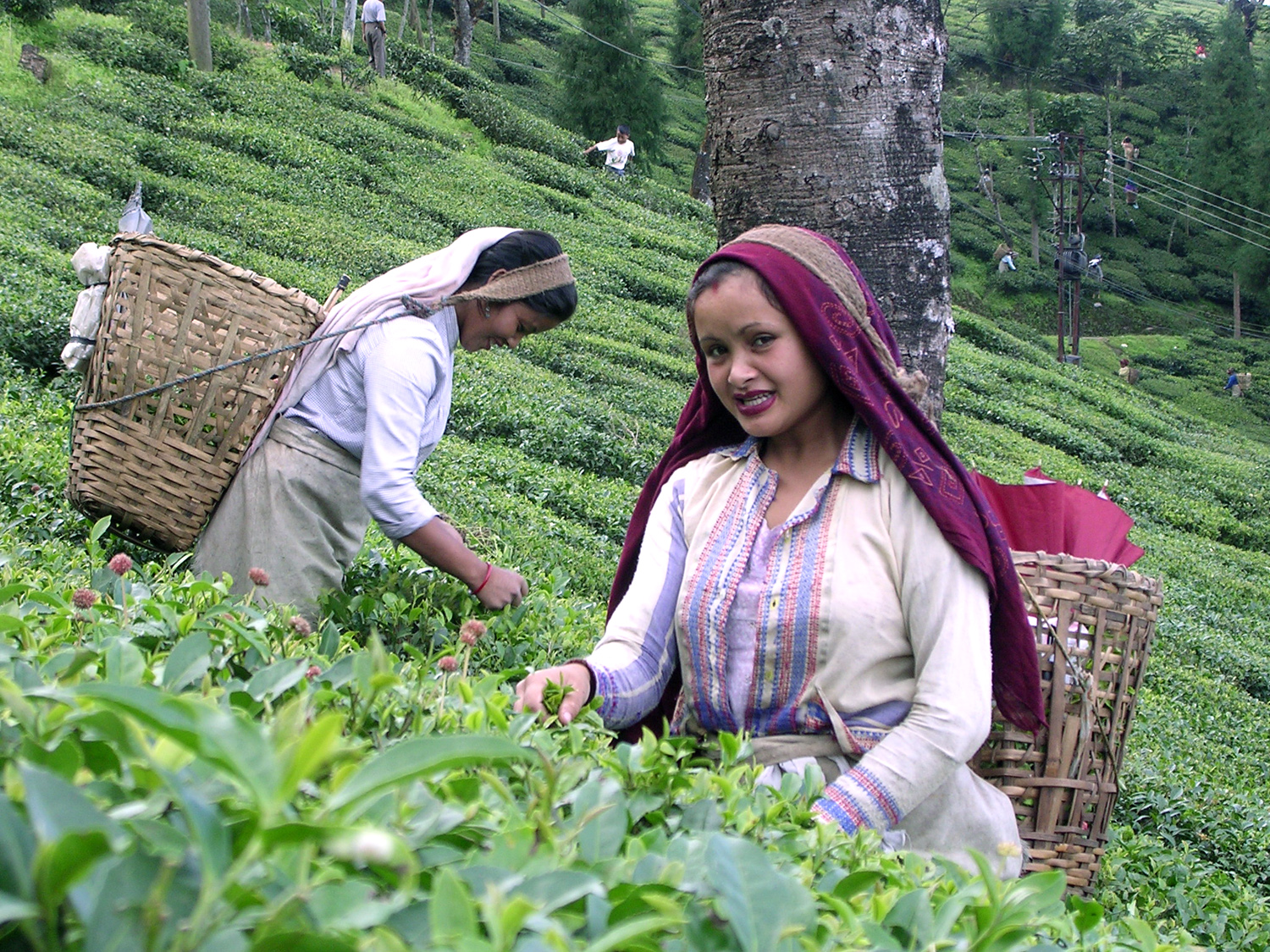
Tea plucking done by tea pickers at Puttabong Tea Estate, Darjeeling

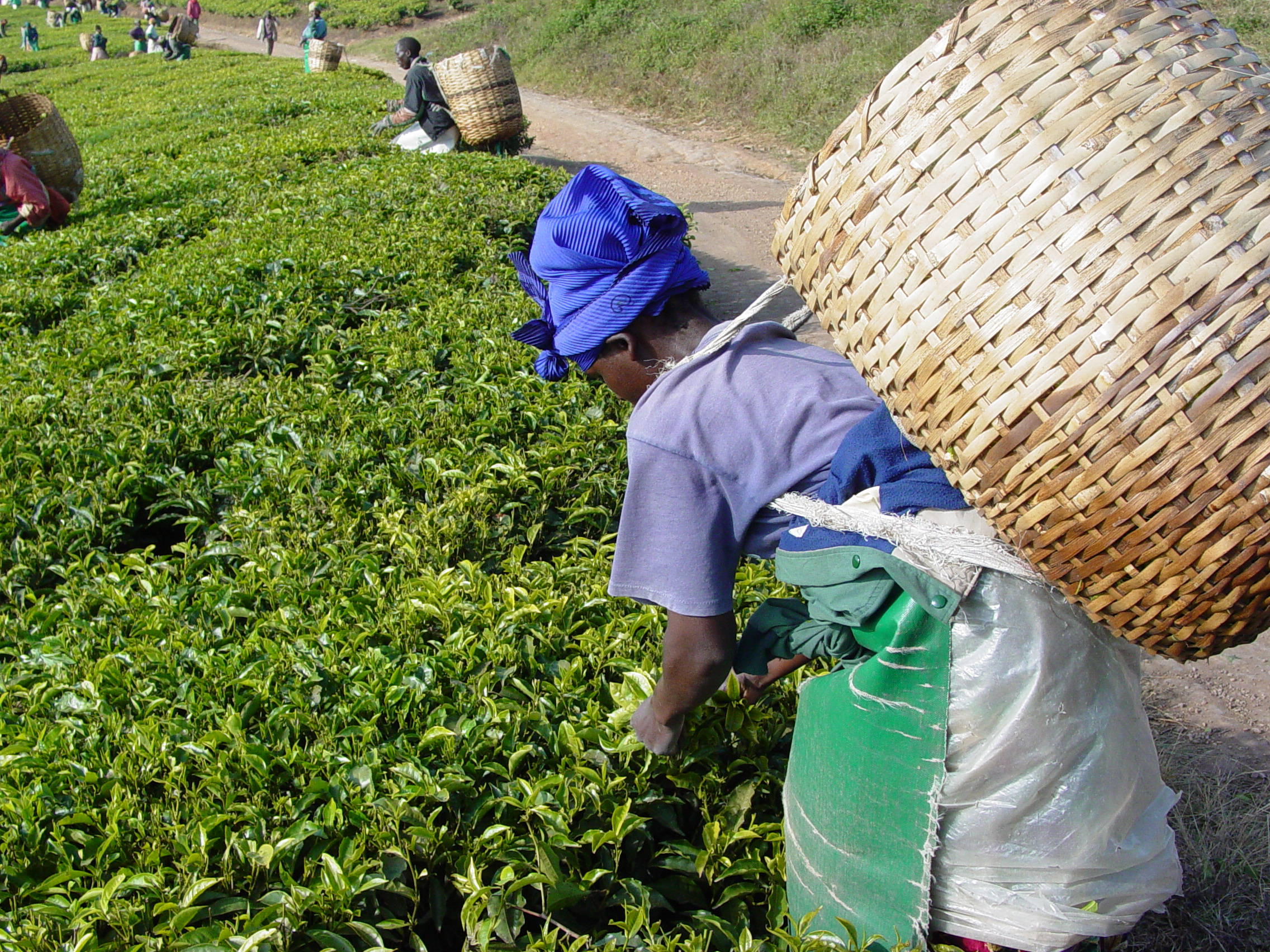
Worker picking tea flushes in Tanzania.

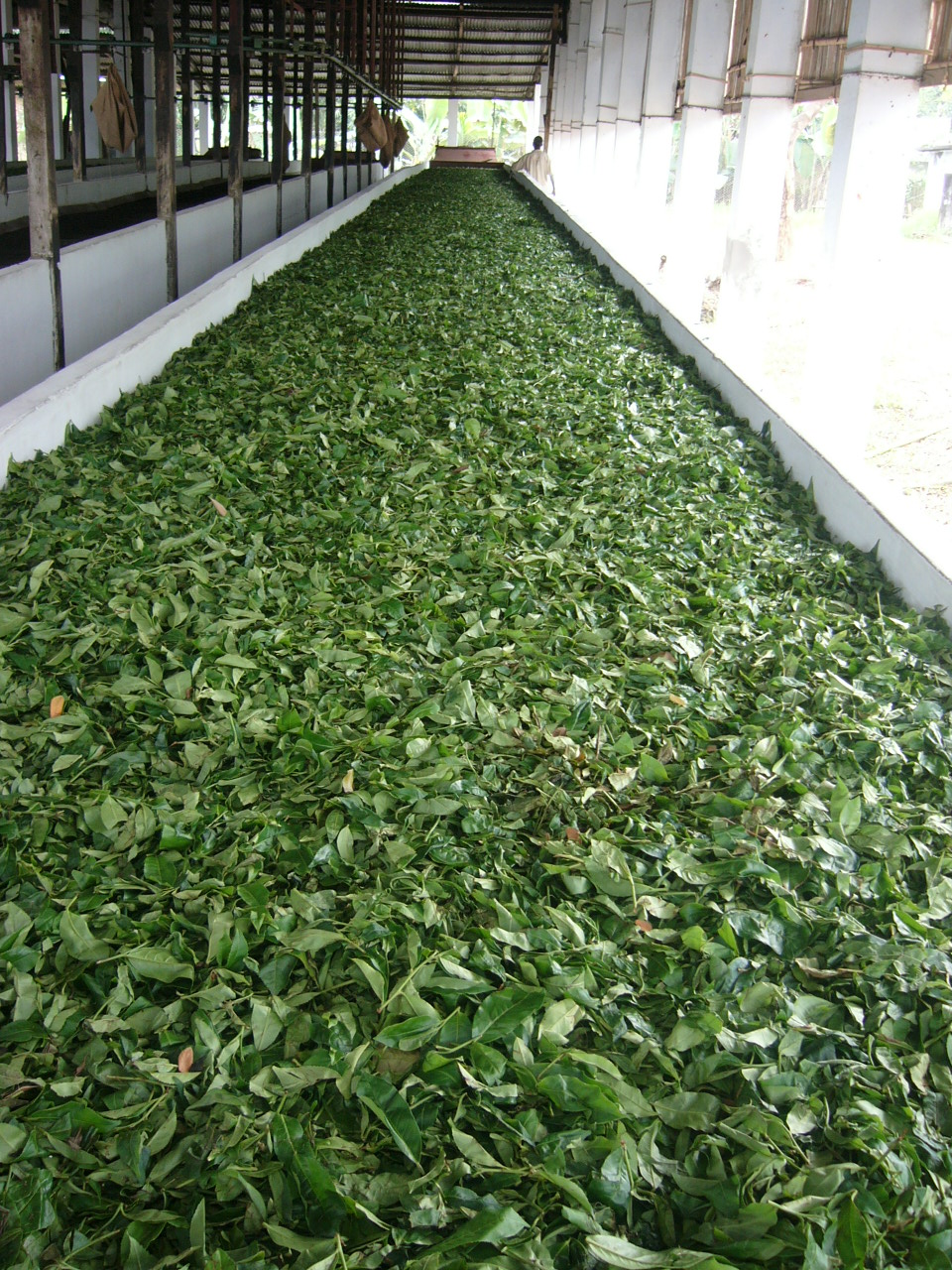
Tea leaves being wilted at a Bangladeshi tea factory

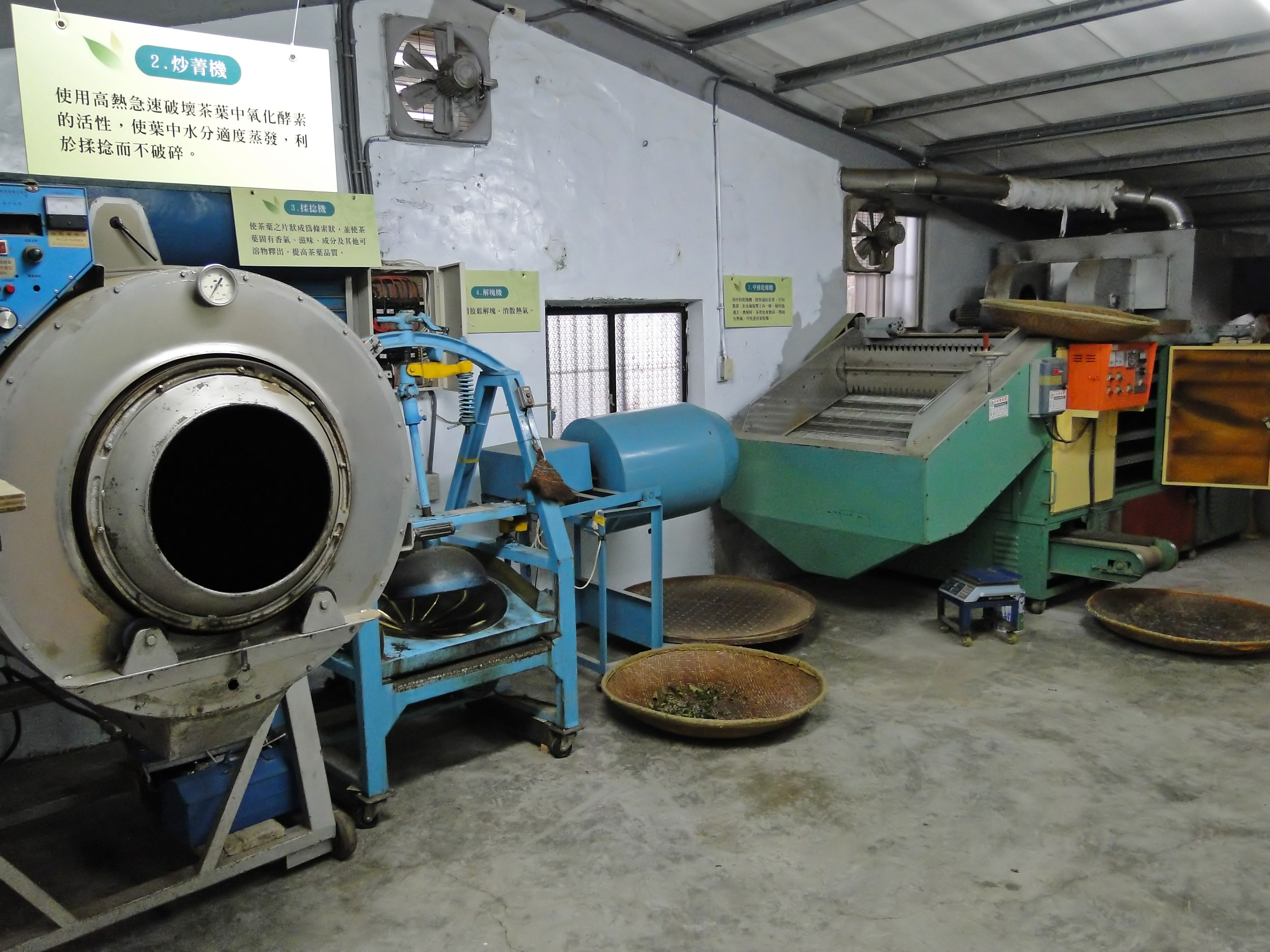
Machinery used for fixation, rolling, break up the rolled tea, and drying the tea.

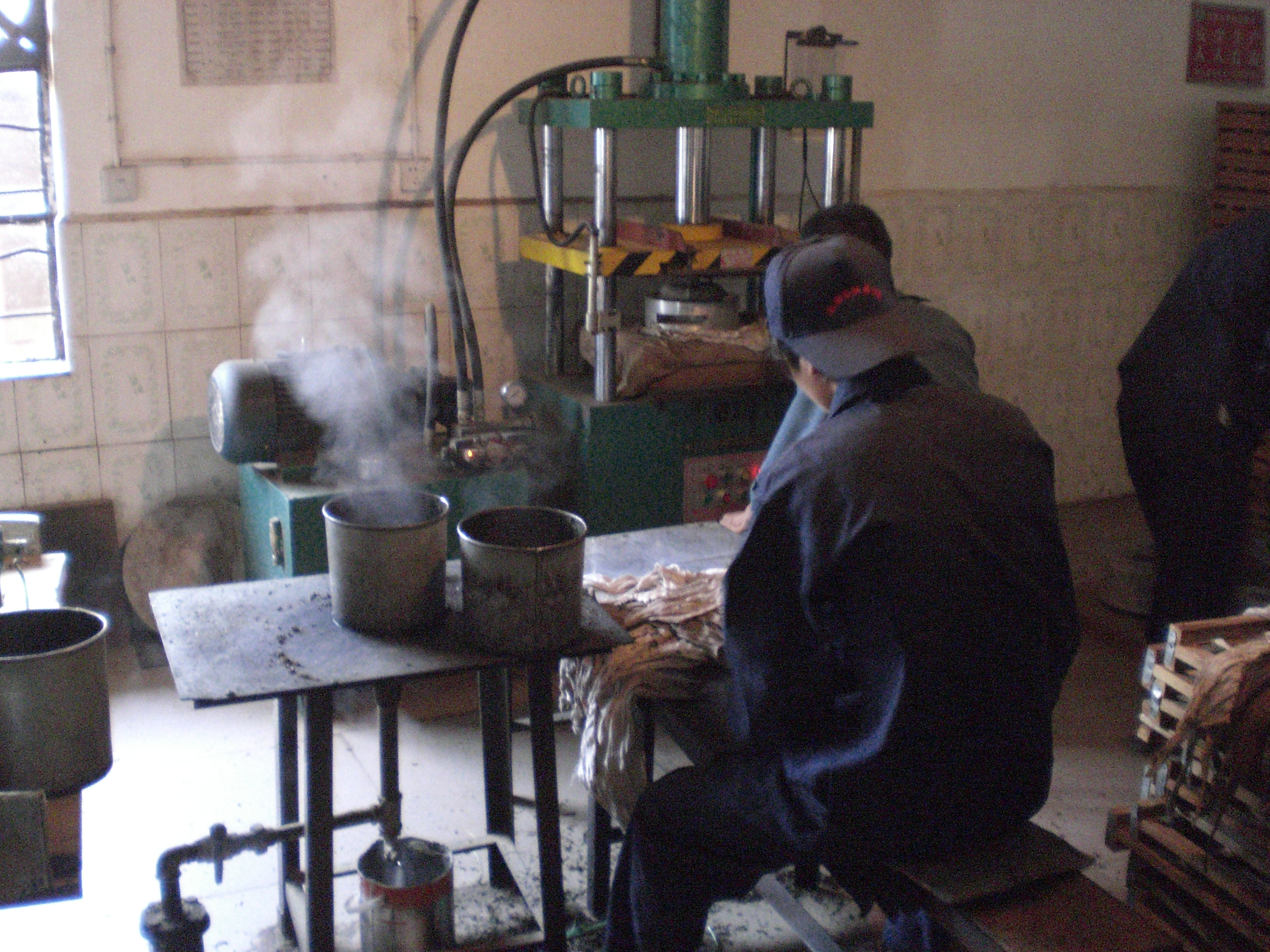
Steaming and pressing pu-erh tea into tea bricks

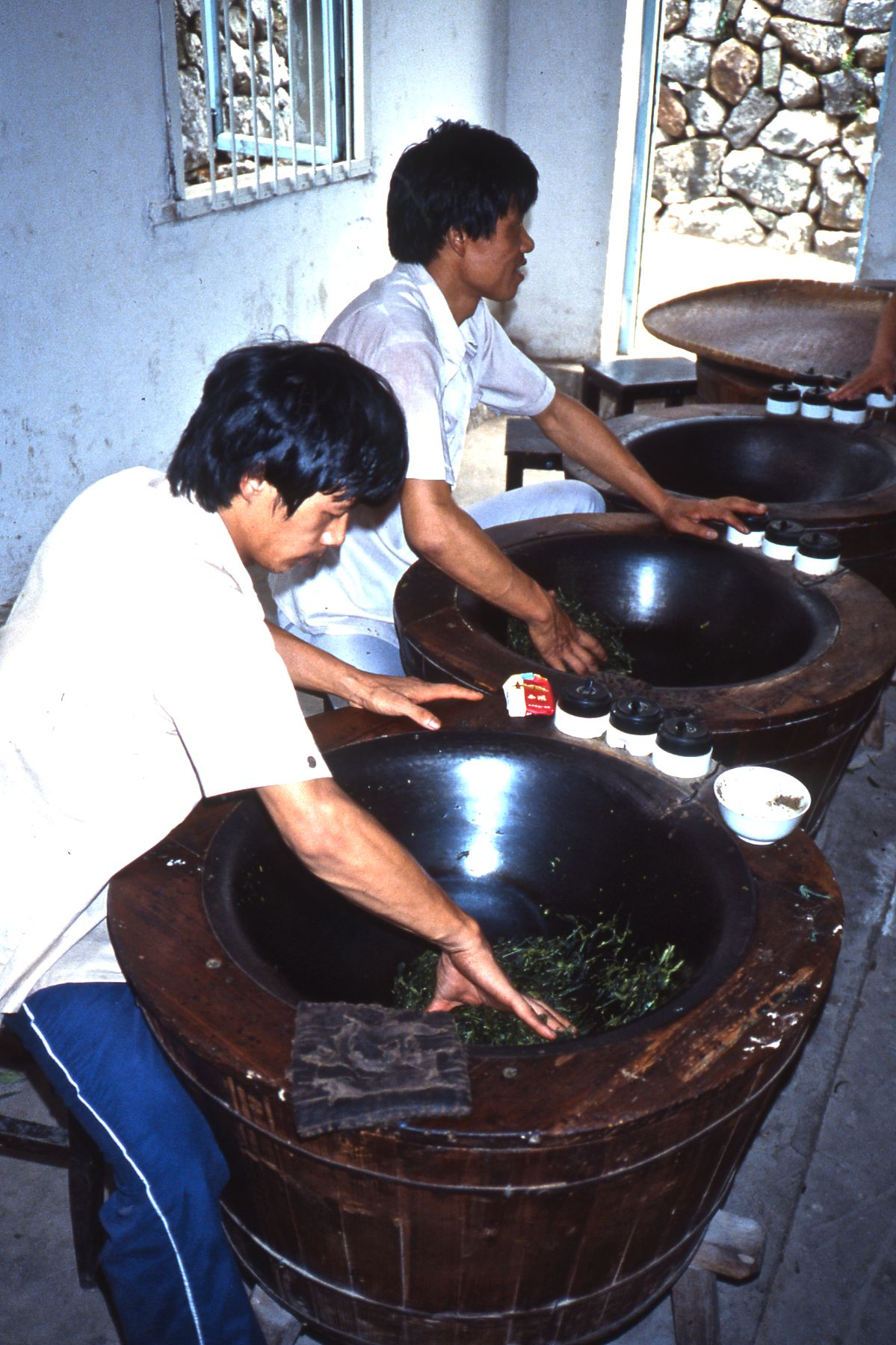
Workers performing fixation (kill-green) on tea leaves at a Chinese plantation, 1987

=== Type-specific ===
Tea is traditionally classified based on the degree or period of oxidation or fermentation the leaves have undergone:

Green tea
This tea has undergone the least amount of oxidation. The oxidation process is halted by the quick application of heat after tea picking, either with steam, the method preferred in Japan, or by dry roasting and cooking in hot pans, preferred in Chinese tea processing. Tea leaves may be left to dry as separate leaves or they may be rolled into small pellets to make gunpowder tea. This process is time-consuming and is typically done with pekoes of higher quality. The tea is processed within one to two days of harvesting, and if done correctly retains most of the chemical composition of the fresh leaves from which it was produced. Variation in steaming time for fixation or processing from additional stages of rolling and drying are sometimes used to improve or alter the flavor for types of green tea. Green tea leaves undergo fixation by either roasting (panning) or steaming. Generally, roasted varieties are richer in flavor, while steamed varieties are more vivid in color.
Yellow tea
This tea is processed in a similar manner to green tea, but instead of immediate drying after fixation, it is stacked, covered, and gently heated in a humid environment. This initiates oxidation in the chlorophyll of the leaves through non-enzymatic and non-microbial means, which results in a yellowish or greenish-yellow colour.
White tea
Young leaves or new growth buds that have undergone limited oxidation through a slight amount of withering while naturally sun dried or specifically withered and then halting the oxidative processes by baking with the optimal withering conditions at 30 degrees Celsius (65% relative humidity) for 26 hours. Withering of the leaves can last from around one to three days depending on the season and temperature of the processing environment. The buds may be shielded from sunlight to prevent the formation of chlorophyll. The tea leaves meant for white teas are not kneaded nor undergo fixation, which preserves much of the white hair on the leaves and gives the tea a relatively mild flavour. White tea is produced in lesser quantities than most other styles, and can be correspondingly more expensive than tea from the same plant processed by other methods. It is less well known in countries outside of China, though this is changing with increased western interest in the tea. There is no internationally agreed-upon definition of white tea. In China, the term implies not only a low-intervention production technique, but also origin in Fujian Province and the use of particular varietals of C. sinensis. In other countries, the term refers to any tea dried with no additional processing, and may also specify the exclusive use of buds or first leaves.
Oolong tea
This tea's oxidation is stopped somewhere between the standards for green tea and black tea. The processing typically takes two to three days from withering to drying with a relatively short oxidation period of several hours. In this regard, most Darjeeling teas with light oxidation levels are more similar to green or oolong teas. In Chinese, semi-oxidized teas are collectively grouped as blue tea (青茶, literally: blue-green tea; also, celadon tea, for the pottery), while the term oolong is used specifically as a name for certain semi-oxidized teas. Common wisdom about lightly oxidized teas in Taiwan (a large producer of Oolong) is that too little oxidation upsets the stomach of some consumers. Even so, some producers attempt to minimize oxidation in order to produce a specific taste or allow the tea leaves to be easily rolled into the spherical or half-sphere form demanded by buyers in the market.
Black tea
The tea leaves are allowed to completely oxidize. Black tea is first withered to induce protein breakdown and reduce water content (68–77% of original). The leaves then undergo a process known in the industry as disruption or leaf maceration, which through bruising or cutting disrupts leaf cell structures, releasing the leaf juices and enzymes that activate oxidation. The oxidation process takes between 45 and 90 minutes to 3 hours and is done at high humidity between 20 and 30 °C, transforming much of the catechins of the leaves into complex tannin. Orthodox processed black teas are further graded according to the post-production leaf quality by the Orange Pekoe system, while crush, tear, curl (CTC) teas use a different grading system. Orthodox tea leaves are heavily rolled either by hand or mechanically on a cylindrical rolling table or a rotor vane. The rolling table consists of a ridged table-top moving in an eccentric manner to a large hopper of tea leaves, of which the leaves are pressed down onto the table-top. The process produces a mixture of whole and broken leaves, and particles which are then sorted, oxidized, and dried. The rotovate consists of an auger pushing withered tea leaves through a vane cylinder which crushes and evenly cuts the leaves. Crush, tear, curl is a production method developed by William McKercher in 1930 which uses machines with contra-rotating rotors with surfaces patterning that cut and tear the leaves producing a product popular for use in tea bags. The rotovate is often used to pre-cut the withered tea prior to the CTC and to create broken orthodox processed black tea.
Post-fermented tea
Teas that are allowed to undergo a second oxidation after the fixation of the tea leaves, such as Pu-erh, Liu'an, and Liubao, are collectively referred to as secondary or post-fermentation teas in English. In Chinese they are categorized as Dark tea or black tea. This is not to be confused with the English term Black tea, known in Chinese as red tea. Pu-erh, also known as Póu léi (Polee) in Cantonese is the most common type of post-fermentation tea in the market.

Examples of various types tea
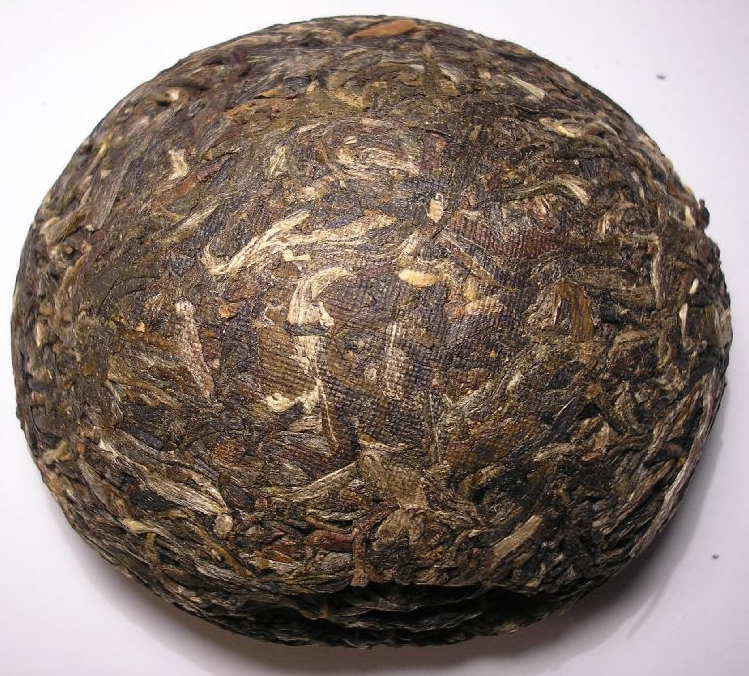
Green Pu-erh tuo cha, a type of compressed raw pu-erh

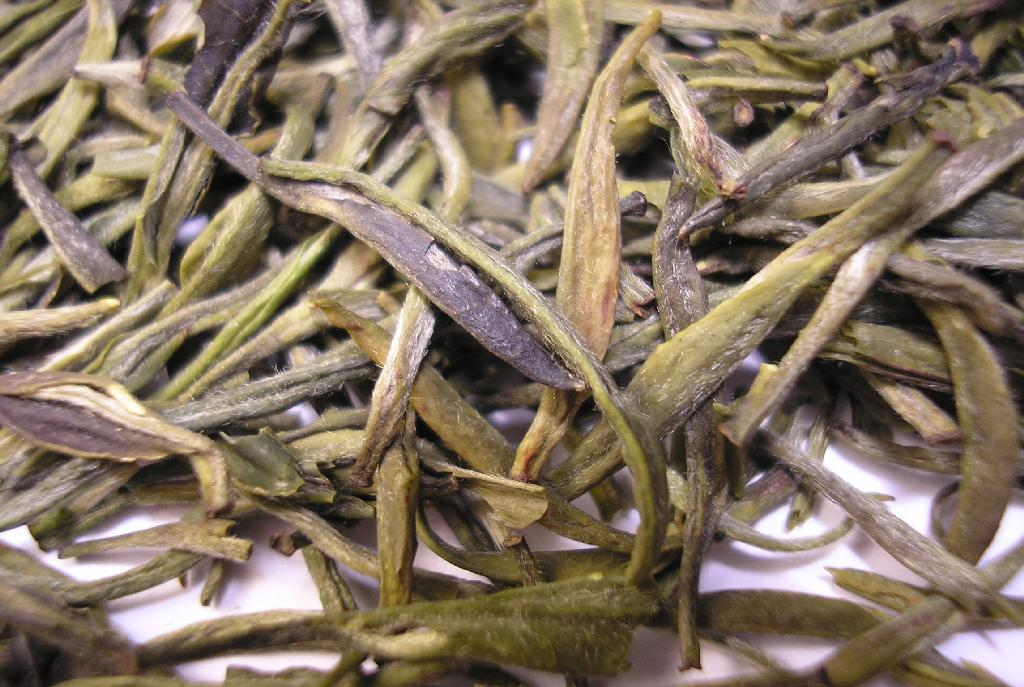
Huoshan Huangya tea, a Yellow tea

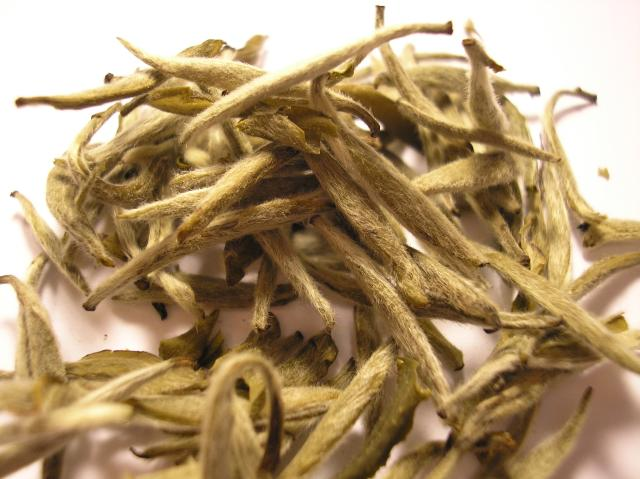
Fuding Baihao Yinzhen, a white tea

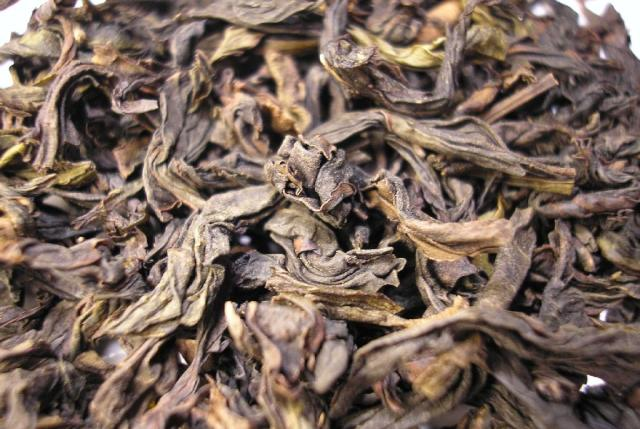
Da Hong Pao, an Oolong tea

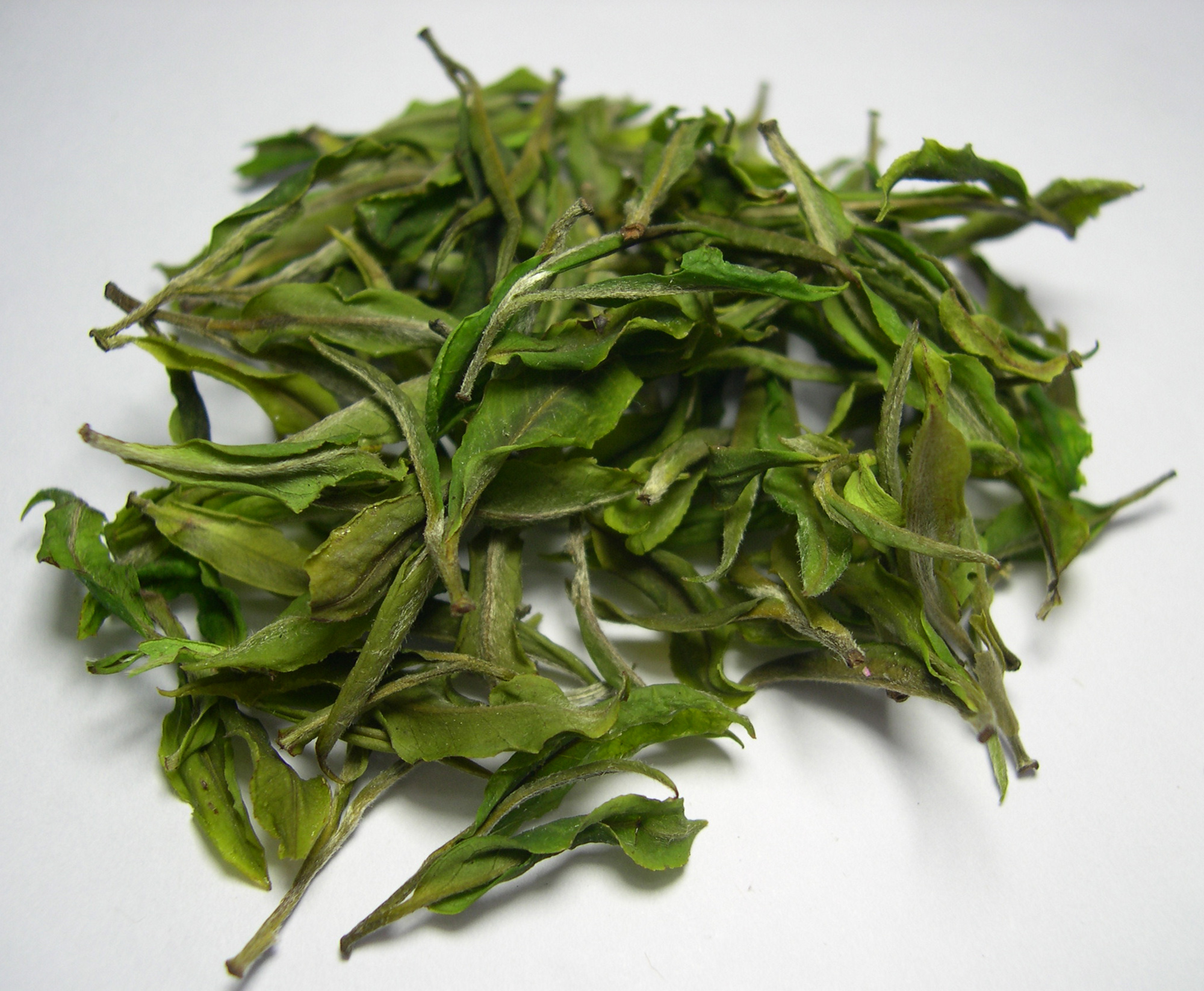
Organic Darjeeling White Tea processed at Arya Tea Estate in Darjeeling

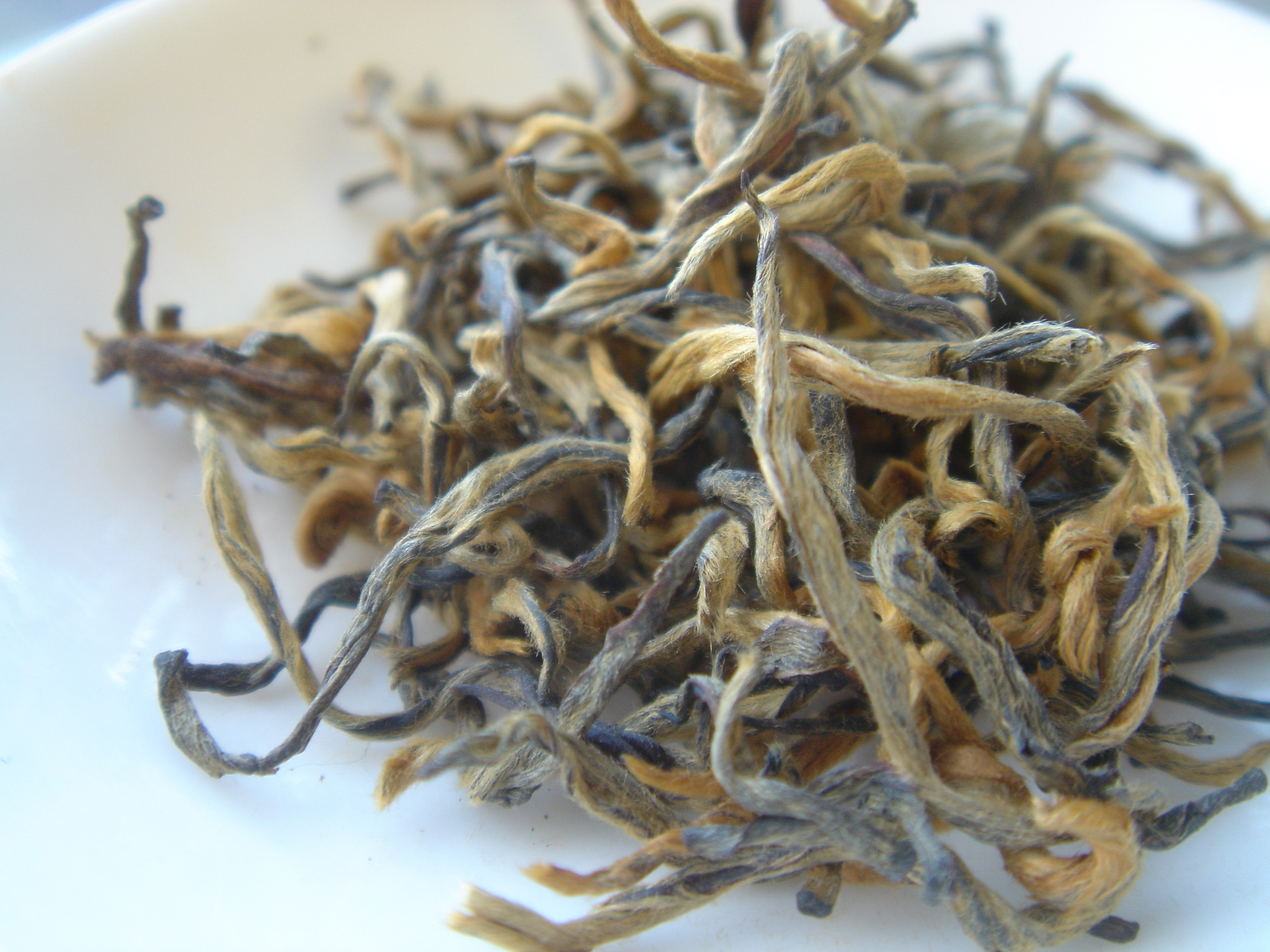
Yunnan golden Dianhong, a Black tea

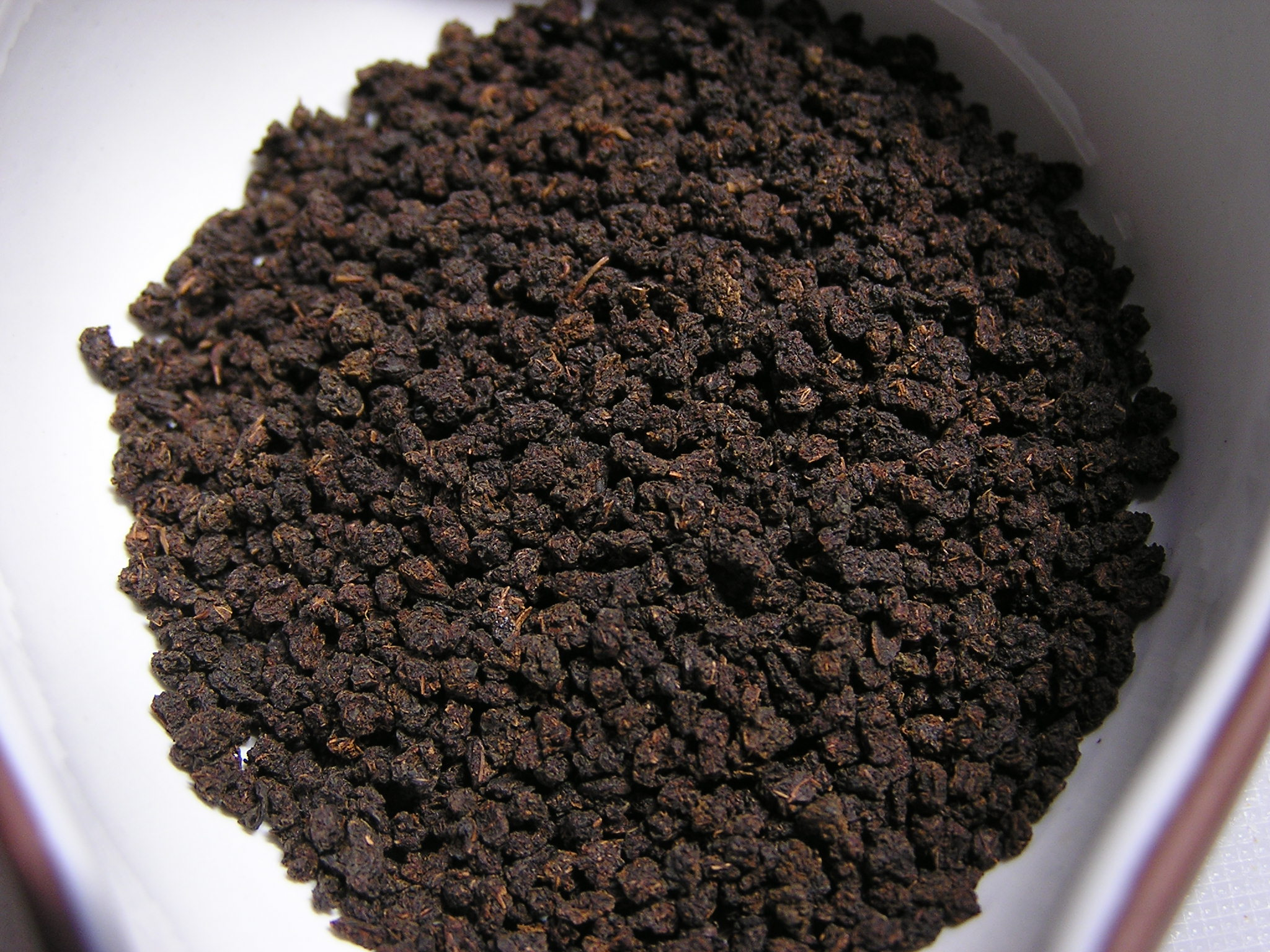
Black tea produced through CTC processing

== See also ==
- Tea productions by country:
  - Portugal
  - Sri Lanka
  - United States
  - Kenya
  - Bangladesh
  - Azerbaijan
