= Rougui tea =

Chinese tea plant variety

Rougui tea 肉桂茶
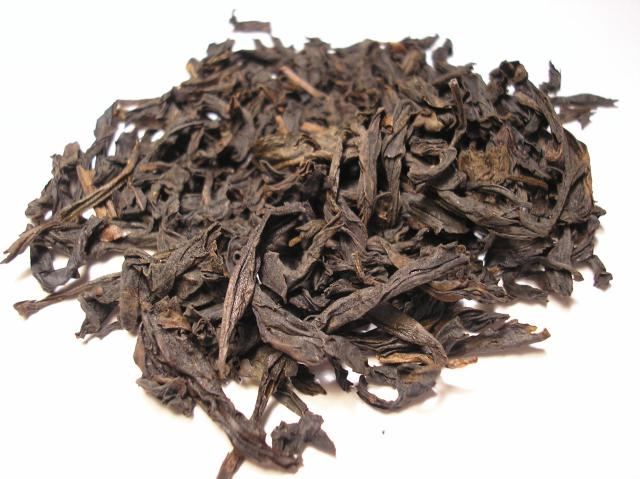
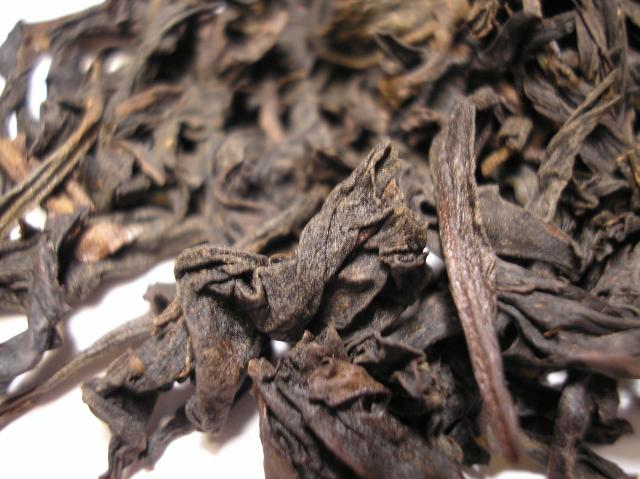
- Type: Wuyi oolong
- Origin: Wuyi Mountains, Fujian Province, China
- Quick description: Cassia (Chinese cinnamon) aroma

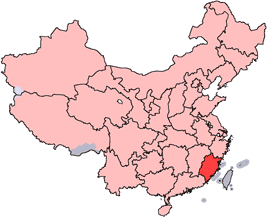
Rougui tea is grown in Fujian province, China.

Rougui tea (Chinese: 肉桂茶; pinyin: ròuguì chá; pronounced [ɻôʊ.kwêɪ ʈʂʰǎ]) is a variety of the tea plant, commonly grown in the Wuyi Mountains and processed into oolong tea. The name literally means "cassia". The tea can be difficult to prepare, but its distinctive sweet aroma can be brought out up to 7 steepings. It was first developed during the Qing dynasty.

== Description ==
This tea may be traditionally processed producing a dark dry leaf and a rich smell or processed according to new consumer standards, giving it a leaf of mixed color and a more fruity aroma.

== Gallery ==
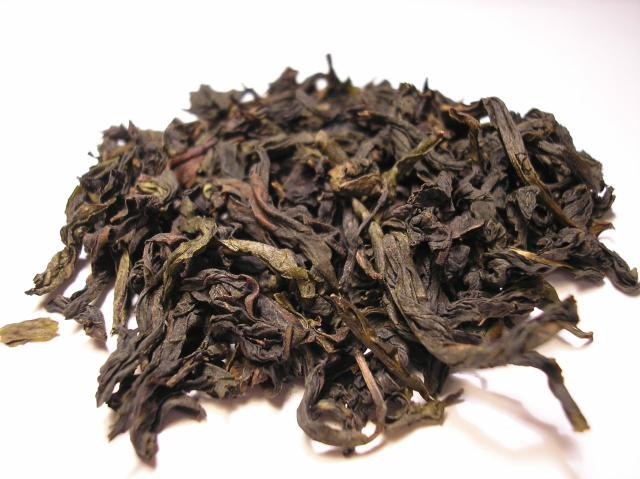
Spring tea processed to new consumer standards

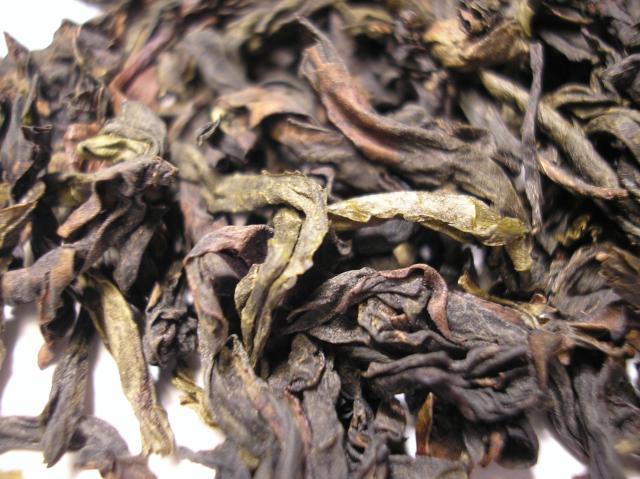
Spring tea processed to new consumer standards close up
