= Depp (surname) =

Depp is a surname of French origin. Notable people with the surname include:

- Bucek Depp (born 29 January 1973) Indonesia actor and model
- Harry Depp (22 February 1883 – 31 March 1957) American actor
- Johnny Depp (born 1963), American actor
- Lily-Rose Depp (born 1999), French-American actress and model
- Nettie Depp ((November 21, 1874 – August 3, 1932) Education Reformer
- Peter Depp (born July 26, 1981) an American stand-up comedian
