= Domiziano Arcangeli =

Italian actor, producer and writer

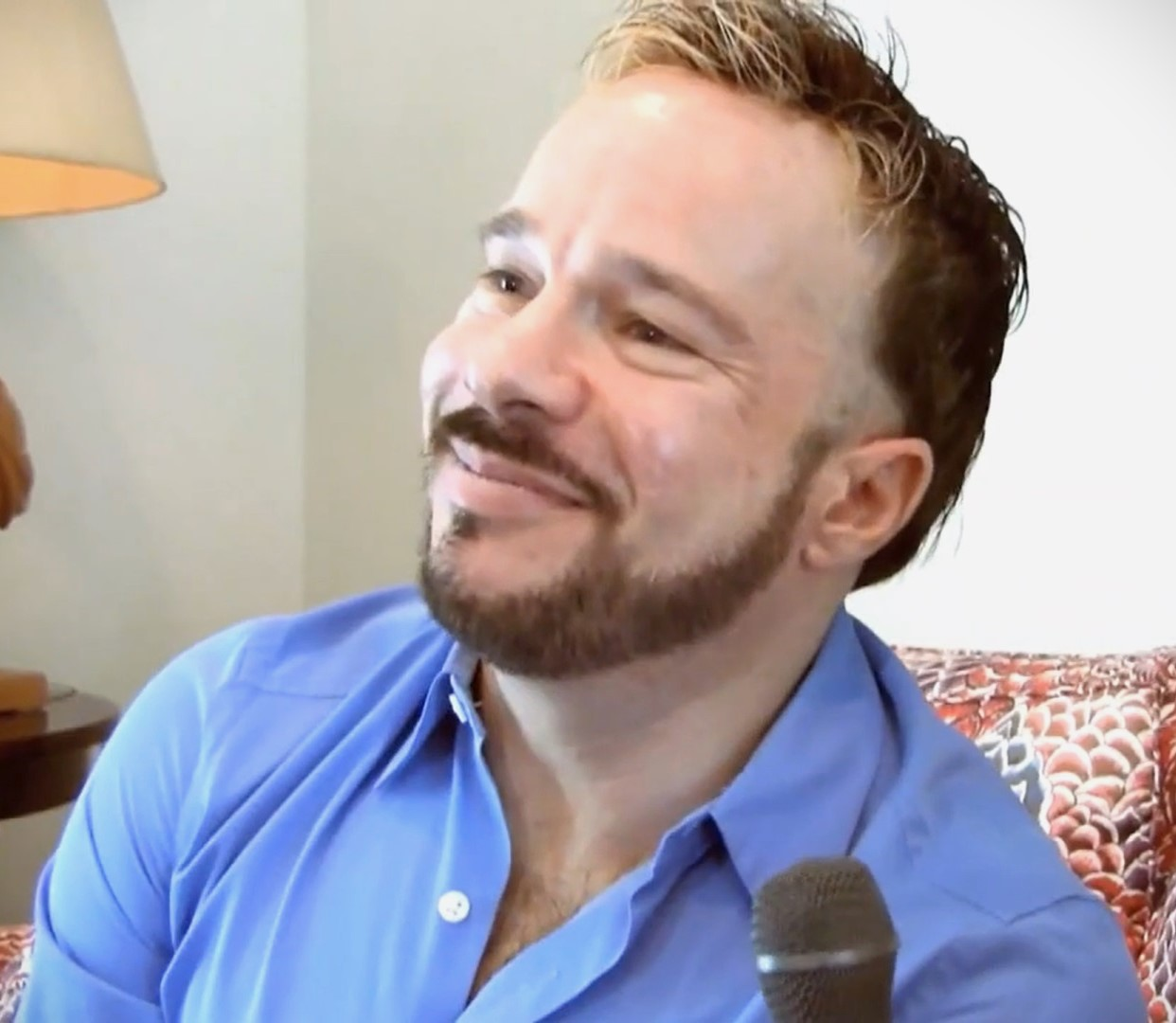
- Arcangeli in 2011
- Born: Domiziano Arcangeli; June 10, 1968; Venice, Italy
- Died: July 13, 2020 (aged 52); Los Angeles, California, U.S.
- Occupations: Film actor, producer, writer
- Years active: 1980–2020
- Spouses: Raffaella Baracchi (m. 1988–1991) Christine Santomes (m. 1996–2002)
- Children: Skyler Cameron Arcangeli, Thor-Lyndon Arcangeli

Domiziano Arcangeli (June 10, 1968 – July 13, 2020) was an Italian actor, producer and writer best known for low-budget independent, and particularly exploitation, films.

Having worked as a model and stage actor and played supporting roles in films such as Tinto Brass' Paprika (1991) and Stelvio Massi's L'urlo della verità (1992), Arcangeli relocated from Italy to the United States and was cast in Zalman King's TV series ChromiumBlue.com (2002-2003). He then moved on to darker roles, such as his first American antagonist in the thriller Sin's Kitchen (2004), and worked in several other independent films, like Luigi Desole's The Seer (2007) and Kurando Mitsutake's Samurai Avenger: The Blind Wolf (2009). He appeared in the second season of the TV series Femme Fatales (2012), Giorgio Serafini's action flick Ambushed (2013 a.k.a. Hard Rush), Ivan Zuccon's psychological horror Wrath of the Crows (2013) and Paul Hough's futuristic thriller The Human Race (2014).

In 2009 Arcangeli founded the production company Empire Films, producing and starring in House of Flesh Mannequins (2009), Virus X (2010) and The Ghostmaker (2012 a.k.a. Box of Shadows), both released in the United States by Lionsgate Films, and the comedy Scenes from a Gay Marriage (2012). In 2013, along with his new business partner Aaron Benore, and Jake Barsha of Right Hook Films, Arcangeli co-executive produced the TV miniseries The Bathroom Diaries and starred in Creep Creepersin's feature film The Brides of Sodom.

== Selected filmography ==
- 2009: House of Flesh Mannequins (star and executive producer)
- 2009: Samurai Avenger: The Blind Wolf
- 2010: Orgy of Blood (star and executive producer) - rereleased in 2016 as Orgy of the Damned
- 2010: Virus X (star and executive producer)
- 2011: My Name Is A by Anonymous
- 2012: Scary or Die
- 2012: Box of Shadows a.k.a. The Ghostmaker (actor and executive producer)
- 2012: Scenes from a Gay Marriage (actor and executive producer)
- 2013: Wrath of the Crows
- 2013: The Brides of Sodom (star and executive producer)
- 2013: Ambushed
