= Si Da Ming Cong tea =

Four famous oolong teas

Si Da Ming Cong (simplified Chinese: 四大名丛; traditional Chinese: 四大名欉; pinyin: sì dà míng cóng; lit. 'Four Great Tea Cultivars') is a collective term referring to four famous Wuyi oolong tea bush varieties and the tea beverages made from them, namely:

- Da Hong Pao ('Big Red Robe')
- Shui Jin Gui ('Golden Water Turtle')
- Tie Luo Han ('Iron Arhat')
- Bai Ji Guan ('White Cockscomb')
