= To a T =

To a T may refer to:

- "To a T" (song), a 2018 American country song by Ryan Hurd
- To a T (video game), a 2025 video game
- To a Tee, a 2006 film
