= Wuyi tea =

Category of Chinese teas

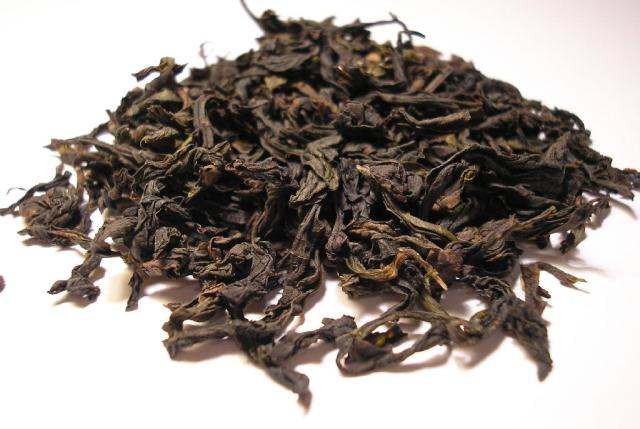
- Da Hong Pao, a typical Wuyi tea
- Chinese: 武夷茶
Transcriptions
Standard Mandarin
- Hanyu Pinyin: Wǔyí chá
Southern Min
- Hokkien POJ: Bú-î Tê

Alternative Chinese name
- Chinese: 武夷岩茶
Transcriptions
Standard Mandarin
- Hanyu Pinyin: Wǔyí Yánchá
Southern Min
- Hokkien POJ: Bú-î gâm-tê

Wuyi tea, also known by the trade name Bohea in English (from its Hokkien name Bú-î), is a category of black and oolong teas grown in the Wuyi Mountains of northern Fujian, China. The Wuyi region produces a number of well-known teas, including Lapsang souchong and Da Hong Pao. It has historically been one of the major centers of tea production in Fujian province and globally. Both black tea (excluding brick tea) and oolong tea were likely invented in the Wuyi region, which continues to produce both styles today.

Wuyi teas are prized because of the distinctive terroir of the mountainsides where they are grown. Because of the lower yield produced by tea bushes in such terrain, the resulting tea can be quite costly. Tea made from the leaves of older bushes is particularly expensive and limited in quantity. Da Hong Pao, collected from what are said to be the original bushes of its variety, is among the most expensive teas in the world, and more valuable by weight than gold. Commercial-grade tea grown at lower elevations in the area accounts for the majority of the Wuyi tea available on the market. Commercial Da Hong Pao is made from cuttings of the original plants.

Among Wuyi teas, certain cultivars are given the special designation “cong” (枞), a term that highlights their distinctive characteristics and lineage. The term “Famous Bush” (名枞), also known as “Single Bush” (单枞), refers to a category of oolong teas within this tradition. These teas are crafted with a distinctive style, possess a unique charm, and are of exceptional quality. Each “cong” originates from individual tea plants with singular traits, embodying the diverse potential of Wuyi tea cultivation.

== History ==
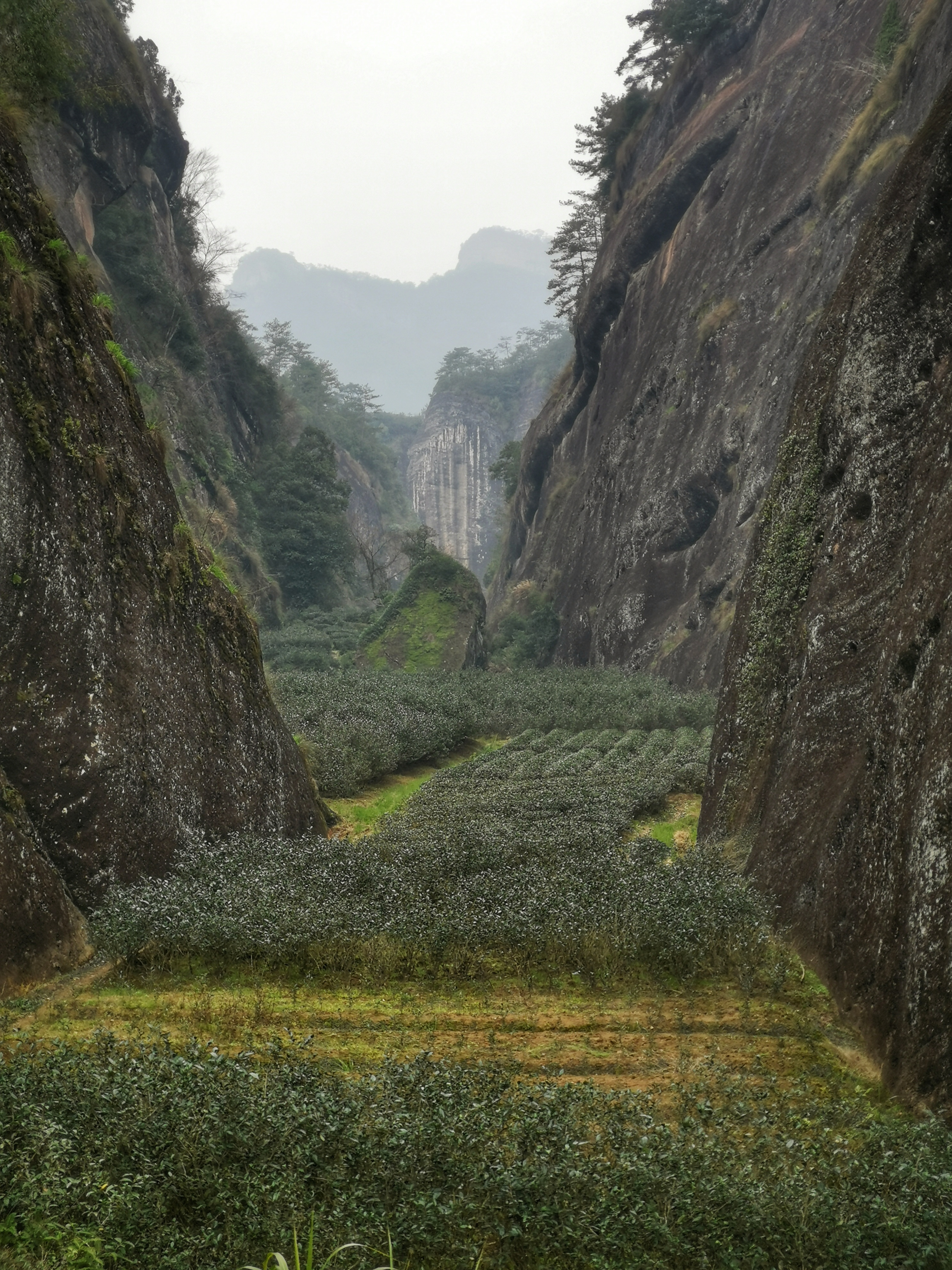
Tea plantation in Wuyi Mountains, Fujian, China

During the Song dynasty, the Northern Park (Chinese: 北苑; pinyin: Běiyuàn) tea estate in Fujian's Jian'ou was the most important supplier of tea to the Song emperors. Established as a private estate under the Min Kingdom, it was nationalized under the Southern Tang and remained so under the Song. It continued to supply compressed cakes of "wax tea" (lacha) to the emperors of the subsequent Yuan dynasty. When the Hongwu Emperor, founder of the Ming dynasty, proclaimed in 1391 that the elaborate and labor-intensive process of producing wax tea "overtaxed the people's strength" and decreed that all imperial tribute tea was to be in the form of loose leaves rather than cakes, tea production collapsed at the Northern Park. The center of the tea industry in Fujian subsequently shifted west to the Wuyi region. In the 16th century, farmers in Wuyi began growing tea and indigo on the mountains themselves, often on estates owned by Buddhist or Taoist monasteries. The farmers cut terraces into the slopes, and built a system of dikes and drains.

During the Ming dynasty, monks at Songluo Mountain (Chinese: 松萝山) in Anhui developed a new technique for stopping the oxidation process of tea, pan-firing the leaves in a dry wok rather than steaming them as had been done previously. Songluo-style green tea became popular, and the new production method spread to other regions. In the 16th century, Wuyi tea makers invited monks from Songluo to teach their techniques to them. Eventually they discovered that by allowing the tea to partially oxidize before firing, they could produce a darker, fragrant type of tea which came to be known as oolong (wūlóng, "black dragon") tea.

=== Export to the West ===
European merchants began purchasing tea in Canton (Guangzhou) during the 17th century. Because green tea formed the bulk of their imports, and because the Wuyi region was initially the main source of the more oxidated teas available to them, the term "Bohea" (based on the local Hokkien pronunciation of "Wuyi") became a blanket name in English for all more heavily oxidated teas; the modern designations "black" and "oolong" were not yet in use. Over time, distinctions began to be made between different dark teas. Lapsang souchong, a Wuyi tea and possibly the first black tea to be produced, was separately traded as "Souchong" for a higher price, while the highest quality black tea was given the name "Pekoe" (Chinese: 白花; pinyin: báihuā; Pe̍h-ōe-jī: pe̍h-hoe), referring to the downy white hair on the young leaves). The term "Bohea" came to mean black tea of the lowest quality.

During the 18th century, Western consumer preferences shifted from green tea toward black tea. The price of black tea dropped significantly during this period, making it more affordable to a larger number of consumers. Bohea tea was consumed in larger quantities than any other type of tea in Europe. When the Ostend Company began competing against the Dutch East India Company (VOC) and the British East India Company (EIC) by importing cheap Bohea tea, the VOC responded by shifting its trade away from green tea toward larger quantities of black tea, mostly Bohea. Because Bohea from the VOC was cheaper than the EIC's tea offerings, consumers in Britain's American colonies illegally smuggled Dutch Bohea in large quantities. The Tea Act of 1773, intended to help the ailing EIC sell its tea in America, instead led to resistance culminating in the Boston Tea Party.

In 1848, the Scottish botanist Robert Fortune went to China on behalf of the British East India Company to obtain tea plants as part of their ongoing effort to establish a tea industry in colonial India. At the time, it was illegal for foreigners to travel inland in China, away from the five treaty ports designated by the Treaty of Nanjing. Fortune therefore went in disguise as a Chinese official, visiting tea producing regions across China. He stole and smuggled out a number of tea plants and seeds from the Wuyi Mountains, and learned from the monks there the full process of planting, picking, and processing the leaves to make tea. He was also able to hire a number of Chinese workers to assist with tea production in Darjeeling.

== Characteristics ==
Wuyi teas are generally more heavily oxidated, spanning the range between black teas and darker oolongs, and are typically twisted into thin strips rather than curled into a ball shape like Anxi or Taiwan oolong teas. They are fired heavily, as were most oolong teas historically, and have a characteristic smoky flavor with notes of stone fruit.

== Notable varieties ==
- Da Hong Pao ('Big Red Robe')
- Rou Gui ('Cinnamon Scent')
- Lapsang souchong
- Tieluohan ('Iron Arhat')
- Bai Jiguan ('White Cockscomb')
- Shui Jin Gui ('Golden Water Turtle')
- Qilan ('Rare Orchid')
- Jin Jun Mei ('Golden Horse Eyebrow')
- Shui Xian ('Water fairy')

== Works cited ==
- Benn, James A. (2015). Tea in China: A Religious and Cultural History. Hong Kong University Press. ISBN 978-988-8208-73-9.
- Berg, Maxine, ed. (2015). Goods from the East, 1600-1800: Trading Eurasia. Palgrave Macmillan. ISBN 978-1-137-40394-0.
- Bunker, Nick (2014). An Empire on the Edge: How Britain Came to Fight America. Knopf Doubleday Publishing Group. ISBN 978-0-385-35164-5.
- Carp, Benjamin L. (2010). Defiance of the Patriots: The Boston Tea Party and the Making of America. Yale University Press. ISBN 978-0-300-16845-7.
- Dolin, Eric Jay (2013). When America First Met China: An Exotic History of Tea, Drugs, and Money in the Age of Sail. W. W. Norton & Company. ISBN 9780871406897.
- Ellis, Markman; Coulton, Richard; Mauger, Matthew (2015). Empire of Tea: The Asian Leaf that Conquered the World. Reaktion Books. ISBN 978-1-78023-464-9.
- Harney, Michael (2008). The Harney & Sons Guide to Tea. Penguin. ISBN 978-1440642036.
- Heiss, Mary Lou; Heiss, Robert J. (2012). The Tea Enthusiast's Handbook: A Guide to the World's Best Teas. Potter/TenSpeed/Harmony. ISBN 978-1607743781.
- Hohenegger, Beatrice (2014). Liquid Jade: The Story of Tea from East to West. St. Martin's Press. ISBN 978-1-4668-6854-0.
- Mair, Victor H.; Hoh, Erling (2009). The True History of Tea. Thames & Hudson. ISBN 978-0-500-25146-1.
- Rose, Sarah (2010). For All the Tea in China: How England Stole the World's Favorite Drink and Changed History. Penguin. ISBN 978-1-101-19001-2.
- 中国茶树品种志编写委员会 (2001). 中国茶树品种志. 上海科学技术出版社. ISBN 7-5323-5883-6.
