= Shui Xian =

Chinese oolong tea

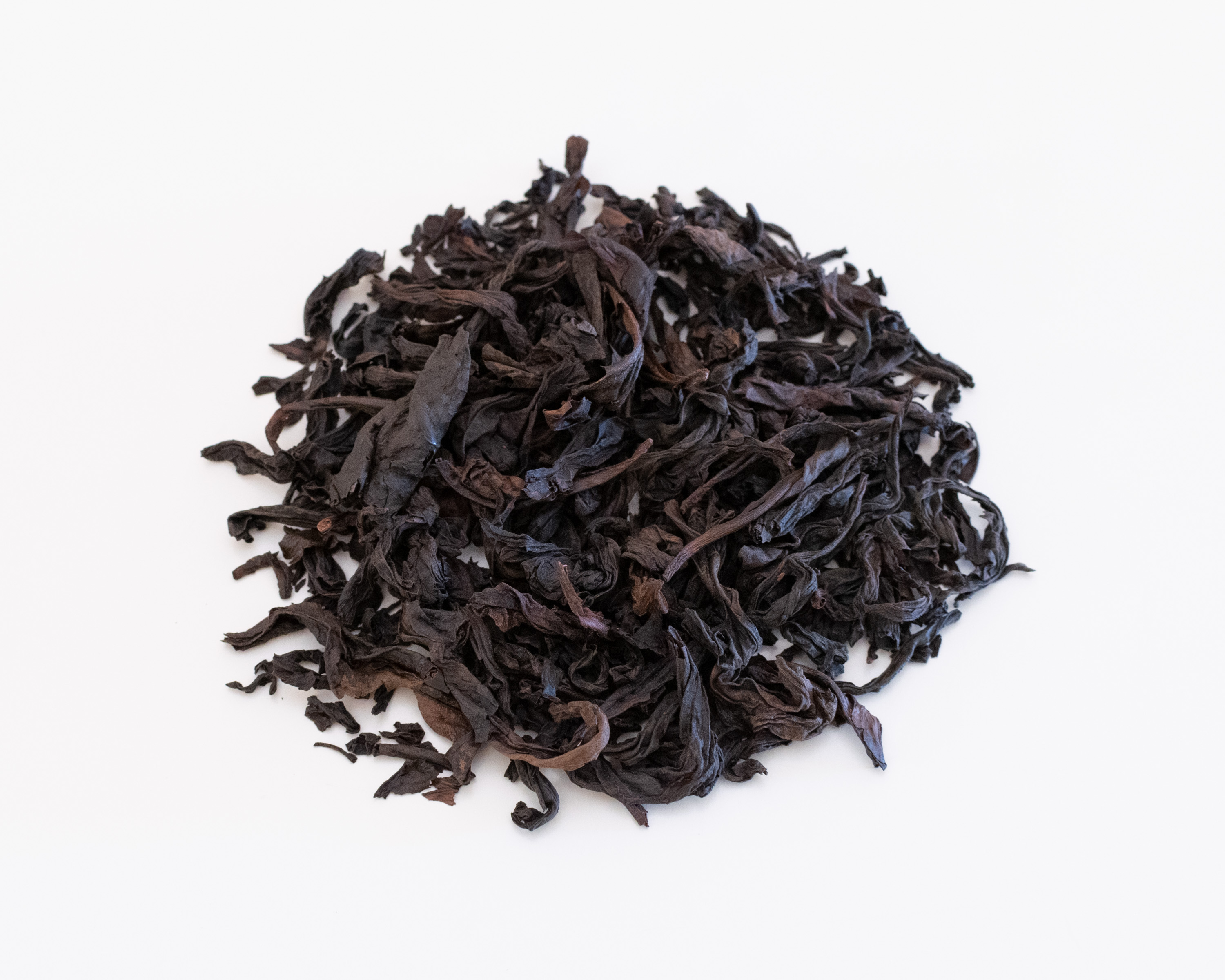
- Type: Oolong
- Other names: Shuixian, Shui Xian, Water Sprite, Sacred Lily
- Origin: Wuyi Mountains, Fujian Province, China
- Quick description: Heavy Wuyi tea, the darkest of the dark oolongs from Wuyi.
- Temperature: 90–100 °C

Chinese name
- Chinese: 水仙
- Literal meaning: "narcissus" or "water sprite"
Transcriptions
Standard Mandarin
- Hanyu Pinyin: Shuǐ Xiān
- Wade–Giles: Shui^{3} Hsien^{1}

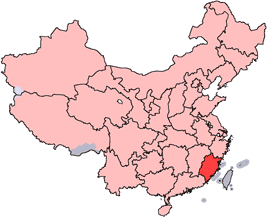
Shui Xian is grown in Fujian province, China.

Shui Xian (traditional/simplified Chinese: 水仙, pinyin: shuǐxiān) is a cultivar of Camellia sinensis (cv. Wuyi Narcissus) as well as an oolong tea traditionally from the Wuyi Mountains in Fujian, China. The infused color is a deep amber which is characteristic for many other Wuyi oolong teas. This tea is also grown in Taiwan and Guangdong.

== Varieties ==
- Lao Cong Shui Xian or Aged Shui Xian (老欉水仙茶): A Shui Xian made from old bushes that may be as old as 200 years. The taste and appearance will signify it as an even darker Oolong. According to Chen De Hua, Lao Cong Shui Xian refers to tea bushes that are at least 50 years old. These older bushes produce a distinct aroma, setting them apart from regular Shui Xian (also known as Da Zong Shui Xian). The unique fragrance, often called 'Cong Wei,' comes from the woody notes of the bush's trunk and branches, combined with the surrounding environment's ecological characteristics.
- Zhangping Shui Xian (漳平水仙茶): A Shui Xian bush that is grown in Zhangping, Longyan, Fujian province and is typically processed as a green oolong.

== See also ==
- Wuyi tea
