= Box of Shadows =

- Directed by: Mauro Borrelli
- Written by: Mauro Borrelli; Scott Svatos
- Produced by: Ed Polgardy; Scott Rudolph
- Starring: Domiziano Arcangeli; Naomi Ueno; Ford Austin
- Cinematography: Eric Gustavo Petersen
- Edited by: Charles Bornstein; Daniel Capuzzi
- Music by: José J. Herring
- Production company: Fotocomics Productions
- Release dates: August 1, 2011 (Los Angeles); January 30, 2012 (United States)
- Country: United States
- Language: English

Box of Shadows (aka The Ghostmaker) is an American fantasy thriller film directed by Mauro Borrelli, produced by Ed Polgardy and Scott Rudolph and written from Borelli and Scott Svatos. The film stars Domiziano Arcangeli, Ford Austin and Naomi Ueno.

== Plot ==
A group of college students find a 15th-century coffin, which is equipped with a part clockwork-mechanical/supernatural contraption that enables contact with spirits and even allows one to experience becoming a ghost for a period of time, whilst cheating death's grasp. Their first adventures in this mystery world brought by said 'box of shadows' has a joyful tone, but the casket soon brings out their more evil side, manifesting their dangerous impulses and darker desires. They are essentially cheating death when they're in the induced ghostly state, so 'Death' itself comes to claim their decaying souls. The film is a reminder that 'cheating death' is never an option, eventually showing the group of students that the line between life and death exists for a very specific reason.

== Cast ==
- Aaron Dean Eisenberg as Kyle
- Liz Fenning as Julie
- J. Walter Holland as Sutton
- Jared Grey as Platt
- Domiziano Arcangeli as Marcus
- Hans Uder as Armaddan
- Wes Aderhold as Young man
- Ruby Staley as Young Woman
- Desmond Lawrence as Policeman
- Ford Austin as The Detective
- Edurne Ganem as Gina
- Scott Svatos as Internet Professor
- Chandler Maness as Reaper
- Edoardo Beghi as Tony
- Naomi Ueno as Asian Girl
- Matthias Balke as Boxing Trainer
- Paul Louis Harrell as Boxing Trainer
- Ian Scott Rudolph as Boxing Trainer
- Mauro Borrelli as Angry Driver
- Ed Polgardy as Elevator Guy
- Vin Nucatola as Arresting Officer
- Brad Littlefield as Manolo
- Erskine Bonilla as Boxer
- Hilary Novelle as Waitress
- Karen Teliha as Old Woman
- Don Yanan as Shopkeeper

== Production ==
Ed Polgardy, Scott Rudolph and Ford Austin produced for Fotocomics Production. The casting began on July 6, 2009 in Burbank, California and the director found Aaron Dean Eisenberg and Liz Fenning for the leads. Director Mauro Borelli began shooting on June 29, 2009 in Reseda and Sun Valley.
