= Scenes from a Gay Marriage =

- Directed by: Matt Riddlehoover
- Written by: Matt Riddlehoover
- Starring: Matt Riddlehoover; Jared Allman; Thashana McQuiston; Carson Nicely; Domiziano Arcangeli
- Cinematography: Shane Bartlett
- Edited by: Matt Riddlehoover; Miranda Megill
- Release dates: October 2012 (Seattle Lesbian & Gay Film Festival)
- Country: United States
- Language: English

Scenes from a Gay Marriage is a 2012 romantic comedy film written and directed by Matt Riddlehoover. It was shot in Nashville, Tennessee.

The film was successful enough that a sequel, More Scenes from a Gay Marriage (2014), was produced.

== Cast ==
- Matt Riddlehoover as Darren
- Carson Nicely as Neighbor
- Cliff Burr as Greg
- Thashana McQuiston as Luce
- Jared Allman as Joe
- Malachi Taylor as Neighbor's Boyfriend
- Devin Walls as Leigh Peters
- Domiziano Arcangeli as Aldo
- Nathan McKellips as Neighbor's Ex
- J.R. Robles as Walt DePore
