= Jared Allman =

American actor

- Born: June 8, 1984 (age 42); Wichita Falls, Texas, U.S.
- Education: Tusculum College
- Occupation: Actor
- Years active: 2004 - present
- Notable work: Scenes from a Gay Marriage; More Scenes from a Gay Marriage; Girls Who Like Boys Who Like Boys: Nashville
- Website: www.jaredallman.com

Jared Allman is an American actor. He attended the University of Tennessee, earning his bachelor's degree in business from Tusculum College.

== Early and personal life ==
Allman’s father was in the Air Force during his early childhood, and as a result, he and his family relocated often. They eventually settled on a farm in Tennessee when Allman was 12. Allman comments, “I would always dream about getting away from the farm. I didn’t want to work in a sewing factory and do the whole family and kids thing.”

During his time at Tusculum, Allman came out to his family when he was 22. “It was almost life and death for me. I felt very isolated, alone, and empty. Like anyone who feels those feelings you start thinking the unthinkable,” he said in an interview with The Advocate. Following college graduation, Allman’s first job was in the music business doing merchandise for a variety of touring artists. He later worked with WME talent agency in Nashville before leaving his position to pursue a career as an actor.

Allman is a former member of the Church of Jesus Christ of Latter-day Saints. He has an adopted younger sister named Jaden Allman, who was originally from Vietnam.

== Career ==
Director Matt Riddlehoover has worked with Allman on numerous films, including West Hollywood Motel and Scenes from a Gay Marriage. Allman reprising his role as "Joe" in the sequel, More Scenes from a Gay Marriage. In 2014, Allman co-starred in the feature film Les Wolf and King Simon.

In television, Allman has appeared in several country music videos and documentary series on the Travel Channel and Disney Channel. He made an appearance in season two of the Sundance Channel's reality series, Girls Who Like Boys Who Like Boys.
