= Jin Jun Mei tea =

Chinese black tea

Jin Jun Mei
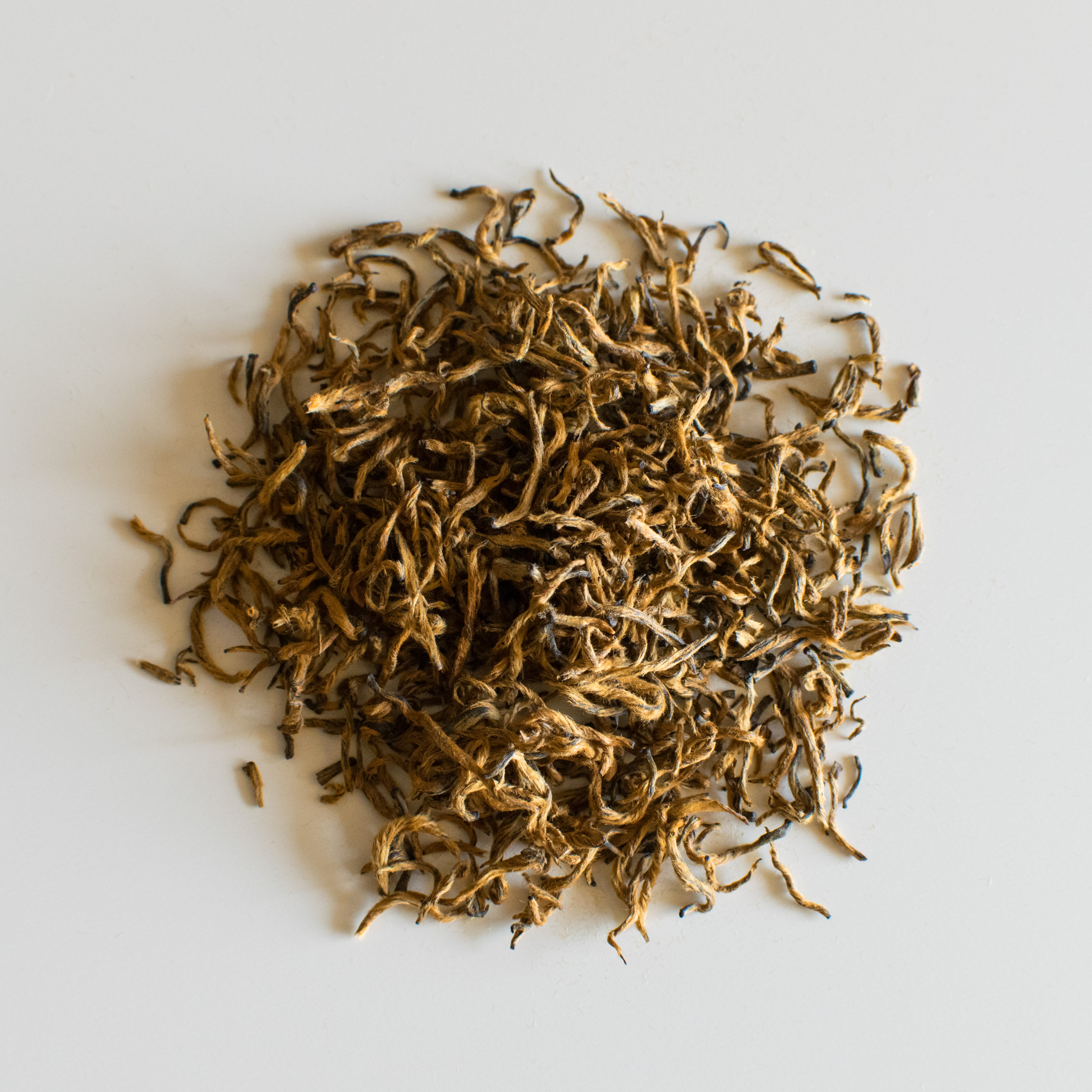
- Type: Black
- Other names: Beautiful Golden Eyebrows
- Origin: Wuyi Mountains, Fujian Province, China

Jin Jun Mei tea
- Traditional Chinese: 金駿眉
- Simplified Chinese: 金骏眉
- Literal meaning: Golden Steed Eyebrow
Transcriptions
Standard Mandarin
- Hanyu Pinyin: Jīn Jùn Méi
- IPA: [tɕín tɕŷn měɪ]
Yue: Cantonese
- Yale Romanization: Gām Jeun Mèih
- Jyutping: Gam1 Zeon3 Mei4
- IPA: [kɐm˥ tsɵn˧ mej˩]

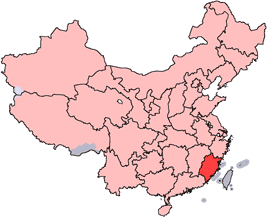
Jin Jun Mei tea is grown in Fujian province, China.

Jinjunmei (金駿眉) is a black tea from the Wuyi Mountains in Fujian Province, China. It is made exclusively from the buds plucked in early spring from the tea plant. The buds are subsequently fully oxidized and then roasted to yield a tea that has a sweet, fruity and flowery flavour with a long-lasting sweet after-taste. The brew is bright reddish in colour. It is a representative of high-end black tea in Fujian and has now become one of the most expensive varieties of black tea in China.

== History ==
In 2005, a group of tea enthusiasts from Beijing visited Tongmu village in Nanping and proposed using buds to make the highest grade of Zhengshan Xiaozhong black tea. In the same year, Jin Jun Mei was first developed by Jiang Yuanxun, Chairman of Wuyi Mountains Zhengshan Tea Industry in Fujian and his team of tea makers led by Liang Junde, a master tea maker. Jin Jun Mei basically follows the traditional manufacturing process of Zhengshan Xiaozhong, while only picking the fresh buds from Tongmu Village.

== Flavor ==
The tea has a sweet taste and is very resistant to brewing. It can be brewed 12 times and the taste remains full and sweet.
