= Shui Jin Gui tea =

Chinese oolong tea

Shui jin gui
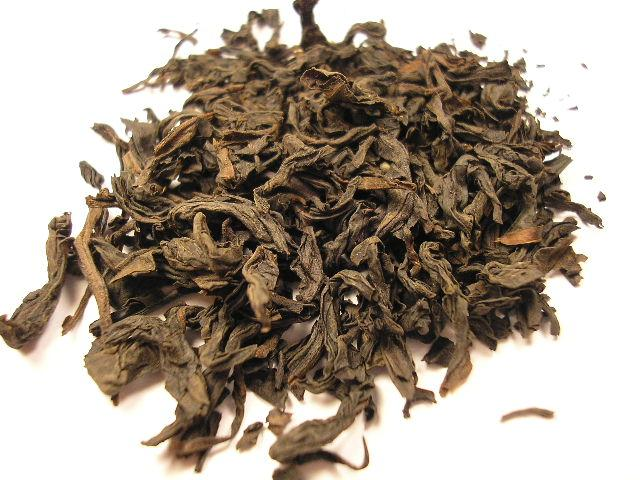
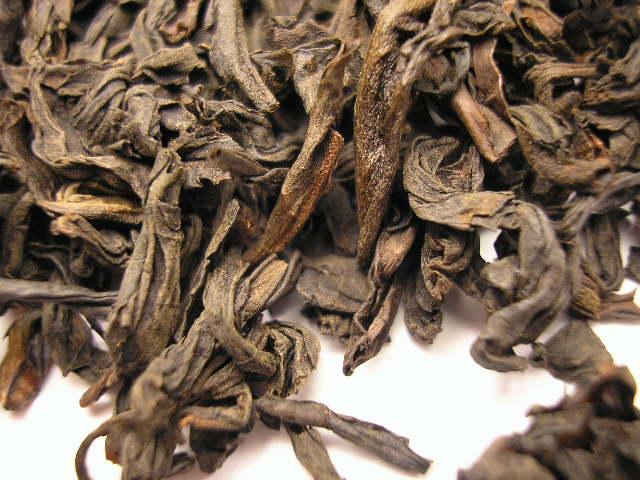
- Type: Oolong
- Other names: Golden water turtle, 水金龜
- Origin: Mount Wuyi, Fujian Province, China
- Quick description: Lighter Wuyi tea

Chinese name
- Simplified Chinese: 水金龟
- Traditional Chinese: 水金龜
Transcriptions
Standard Mandarin
- Hanyu Pinyin: Shuǐ Jīn Guī

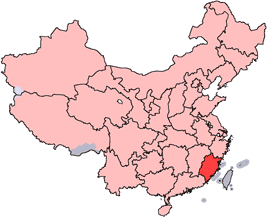
Shui Jin Gui tea is grown in Fujian province, China.

Shui Jin Gui is a Wuyi oolong tea from Mount Wuyi, Fujian, China. Its name literally means 'golden water turtle'. The tea produces an amber/orange color when steeped. It is one of the Si Da Ming Cong, the four famous teas of Wuyi.
