= Bai Jiguan tea =

Chinese oolong tea

Bai ji guan
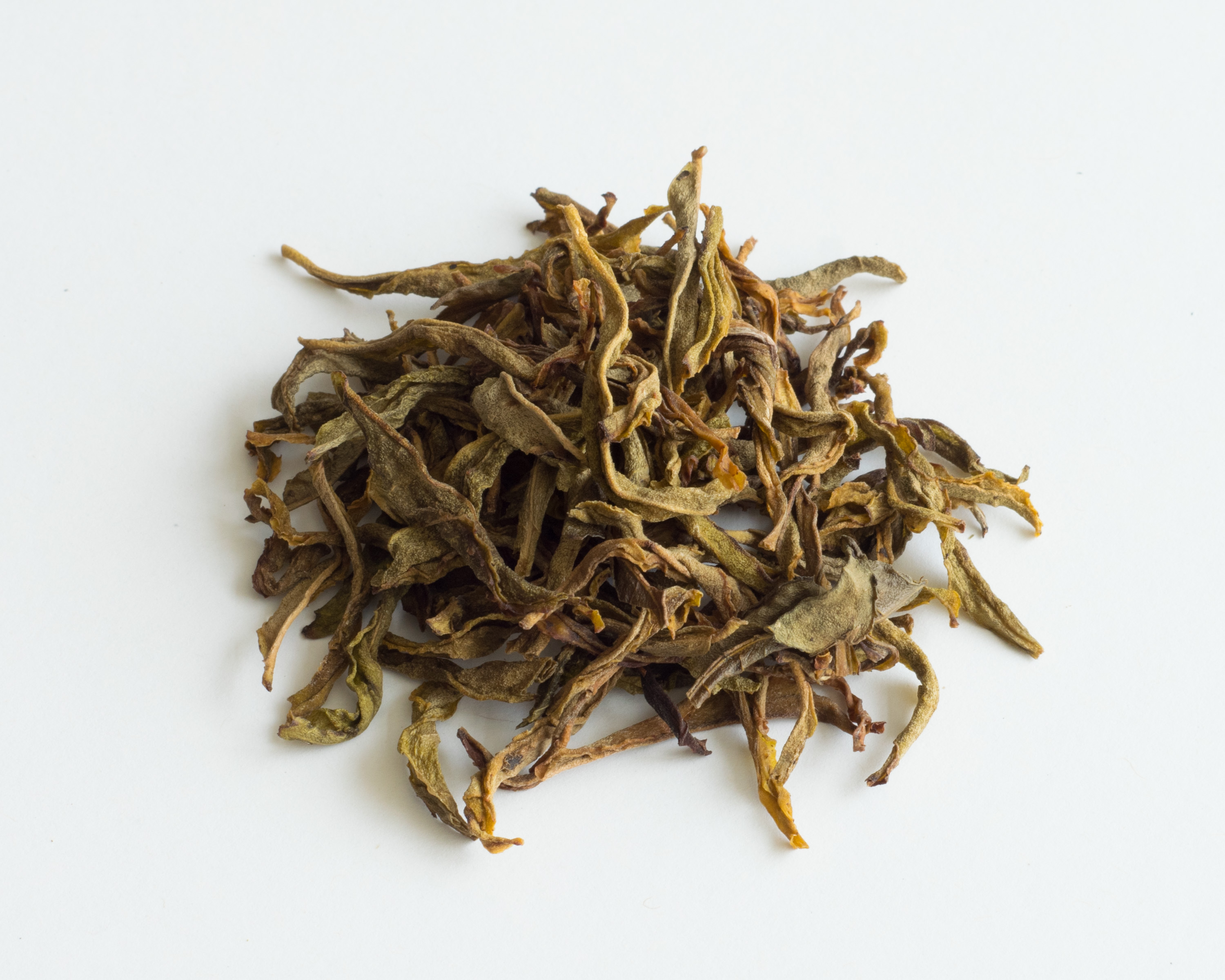
- Type: Oolong
- Other names: White cockscomb, white rooster, 白鸡冠
- Origin: Mount Wuyi, Fujian Province, China
- Quick description: Light Wuyi tea

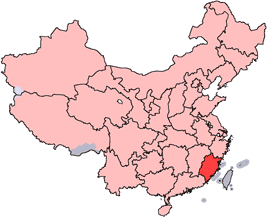
Bai Jiguan tea is grown in Fujian province, China.

Bai Ji Guan or Bai Jiguan (simplified Chinese: 白鸡冠; traditional Chinese: 白雞冠; pinyin: bái jīguān; Wade–Giles: pai^{2} chi^{1}-kuan^{1}; pronounced [pǎɪ tɕí.kwán]) is a very light Si Da Ming Cong tea, a well-known oolong tea of Wuyi, in Fujian, China.

Legend has it that the name of this tea (which translates to 'white rooster' or more literally 'white cockscomb') was given by a monk in memorial of a courageous rooster that sacrificed his life while protecting his baby from an eagle. Touched by the display of courage and love, the monk buried the rooster and from that spot, the bai ji guan tea bush grew.

Unlike most Wuyi teas, the leaves of this tea are yellowish to light green rather than dark green or brown.

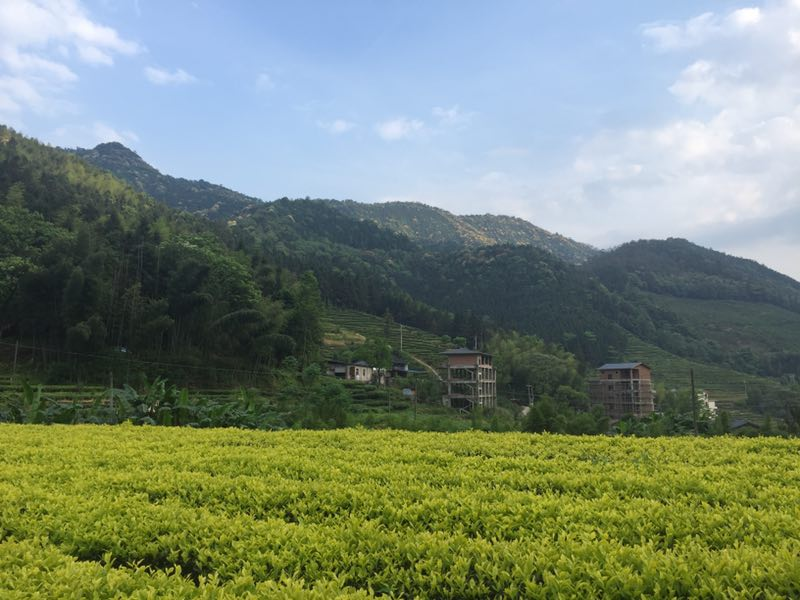
A field of bai ji guan bushes with the light-green leaves characteristic of this tea.

The flavour is also quite different from the other Wuyi oolongs, which tend to be otherwise very similar to a group. Like most Wuyi oolongs, it sits in the highly oxidized end of the oolong tea spectrum, though in the lower range of oxidization for a Wuyi tea, which tend to be 60-80% oxidized.

== See also ==
- Si Da Ming Cong
