= Girls Who Like Boys Who Like Boys =

- Genre: Reality
- Country of origin: United States
- Original language: English
- No. of seasons: 2
- No. of episodes: 20

Production
- Executive producers: Randy Barbato; Fenton Bailey; Sarah Barnett; Michael Klein; Ann Rose
- Production company: World of Wonder

Original release
- Network: Sundance Channel
- Release: December 7, 2010 – January 27, 2012

Girls Who Like Boys Who Like Boys is an American reality television series that premiered on December 7, 2010, on the Sundance Channel. The series chronicles the lives of four gay men and their female best friends. Season 2, which saw the show relocating to Nashville, Tennessee, premiered November 18, 2011.

== Cast ==
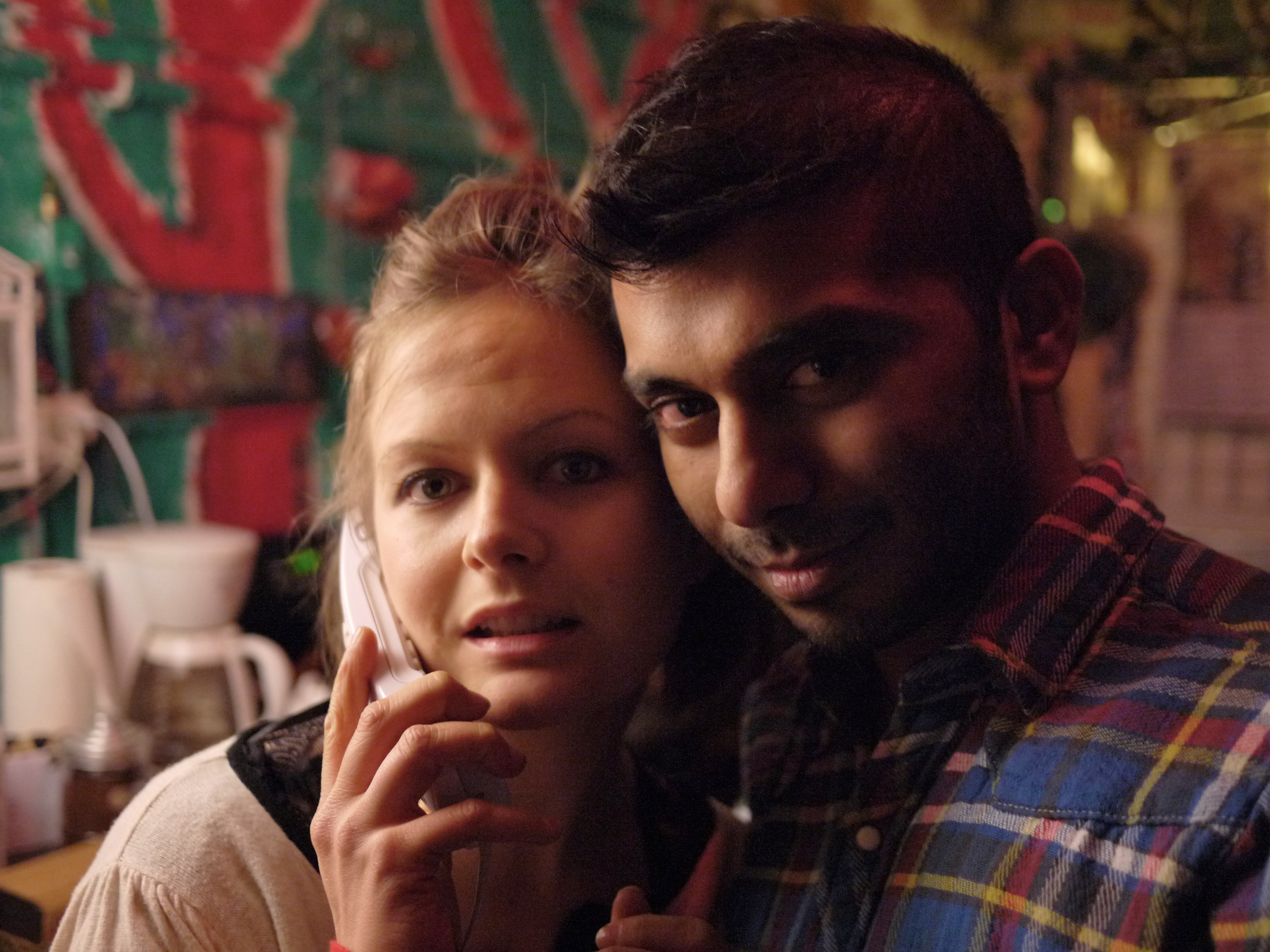
Actress/comedienne Rosebud Baker and actor/playwright Sahil Farooqi in 2011

=== Season 1 ===
- Elisa and David - Elisa Casas owns a vintage clothing store, Chelsea Girl, in SoHo and David Munk manages it. They met while living across the hall from each other in the Weinstein dormitory at New York University.
- Sarah and Joel - Sarah Rose is a travel writer and the author of For All the Tea in China: How England Stole the World's Favorite Drink and Changed History. Joel Derfner is the author of two books, Gay Haiku and Swish: My Quest to Become the Gayest Person Ever and What Ended Up Happening Instead. He also composes musicals.
- Rosebud and Sahil - Rosebud Baker is an actress. She and Sahil Farooqi met in college in Virginia. As of the series premiere, Sahil had not come out to his family.
- Crystal and Nathan - Crystal McCrary and Nathan Hale Williams operate a film and television production company. Crystal is the mother of NBA point guard Cole Anthony and, with Rita Ewing, is the co-author of the novel Homecourt Advantage.

=== Season 2 ===
- Tenisha and Jared - Tenisha Jackson is a children's book author and Jared Allman is an aspiring actor.
- Kristin and Peter - Kristin Sabata is a school psychologist whose husband is deployed in Afghanistan. Peter Depp is a stand-up comedian with three children from a previous marriage to a woman.
- Sherrié and Shane - Sherrié Austin, a former child actress, is a singer/songwriter determined to make a return to performing after years of songwriting for other artists. Shane Stevens is also a songwriter and aspiring singer.
- Olivia and Brent - Olivia McCarthy is a restaurateur and publishes a regional magazine. Brent Oscar Young is an event planner and publicist.

== Series overview ==
Season	Episodes	Originally released	
Season	Episodes	First released	Last released
1	8	December 7, 2010	December 28, 2010
2	12	November 18, 2011	February 27, 2012

== Episodes ==
=== Season 1 (2010) ===
No. overall	No. in season	Title	Original release date
1	1	"The Perfect Couple"	December 7, 2010
The various pairs of friends are introduced. Elisa celebrates a birthday. She and David go running but David injures himself. Crystal and Nathan attend a Fashion Week event. Nathan celebrates his 34th birthday with Crystal and other friends. He wants to be a father by the time he's 35 but Crystal is concerned he doesn't understand what a commitment parenthood is. Joel tells Sarah that he and his psychiatrist boyfriend Mike are engaged. She is happy for him but wishes she had a relationship of her own. Rosebud and Sahil visit Splash, a gay club. Sahil struggles with a number of internalized stereotypes about gay men.
2	2	"Three's A Crowd"	December 7, 2010
David gets botox. He and Elisa interview about his fear of aging, something she does not understand. Crystal and Nathan meet with Crystal's writing partner Rita Ewing about adapting Crystal and Rita's novel Homecourt Advantage into a film. The women questions Nathan's ability to reconcile fatherhood with his partying lifestyle. Joel and fiancé Mike plan for their wedding in Iowa. Sarah interviews that she is happy for them but wishes she could find a man as well, something that has proven difficult because she is the primary caregiver for her mother, who has dementia. Elisa throws herself a 45th birthday party. David, who has been having arguments with everyone recently, comes as a mime so he won't be able to speak. Sahil throws a potluck. Rosebud brings along her new boyfriend Jason, of whom Sahil does not approve.
3	3	"Baby on My Mind"	December 14, 2010
Joel and Sarah plan Joel and Mike's wedding in Iowa (where same-sex marriage is legal) and a ceremony in Brooklyn. Elisa's daughter Ruby leaves for a three-week trip to Paris. Her ex-husband Steve and David (dressed as "Marge the scrapbooking lady") console Elisa, who interviews that she's saddened by the loss of her family structure. Sahil and Rosebud discuss relationships and whether Sahil should come out to his family. Nathan asks Crystal to be his surrogate.
4	4	"Matchmaker Matchmaker"	December 14, 2010
Crystal and Nathan get styled for the NAACP Image Awards and each discusses Crystal's possible surrogacy with their stylist. Joel and Sarah visit a matchmaker for Sarah. She sets up a date for Sarah but it doesn't go well. David entertains a depressed Elisa, who interviews about her need to redefine herself beyond being a wife and mother. Rosebud takes Sahil speed dating but he is only interested in the (straight) bartender.
5	5	"Flying Blind"	December 21, 2010
Elisa and David shop a flea market and talk about her upcoming blind date. A psychic tells Elisa that she will find love with a Libra man. Crystal and Nathan don't win the Image Award; Nathan later speaks with his mother about becoming a father and she supports him. Sarah and Joel attend a party for the release of Sarah's first book. Later Joel sets Sarah up on a date; things go well but Sarah learns that her date is leaving town in two months. Rosebud has Sahil meet her friend Luke to share Luke's coming out story. Later she travels to Houston for a memorial for her sister, who drowned eight years ago.
6	6	"Great Expectations"	December 21, 2010
Elisa's blind date turns out to be a Libra, as the psychic predicted. Rosebud and Sahil talk about her sister's memorial and Sahil says he is ready to start coming out to his family. David interviews about his first boyfriend, Stephen, who died of AIDS in 1988. David was diagnosed with HIV in 1995, which led to his becoming an alcoholic. When he got sober he reconnected with Elisa. Crystal dines with her aunt Ruthie and expresses her concern about being a surrogate. Nathan explores adoption and learns that surrogacy contracts are illegal in New York. Joel is increasingly nervous about his wedding which is three weeks away.
7	7	"Out of the Closet"	December 28, 2010
Nathan tells Crystal he plans to adopt and withdraws the surrogacy question. David celebrates 18 months of sobriety. His boyfriend Richie initially texts that he can't make the party but later shows up as a surprise. Sarah throws Joel and Mike an engagement party; Joel and Sarah are upset because Sarah doesn't think she can afford the trip to Iowa for his wedding. Rosebud breaks up with Jason. Sahil comes out to his brother Taasin, who says he wishes Sahil had done so earlier but supports him nonetheless. Sahil meets up with Rosebud, who gets angry that Sahil is not supportive enough of her pain at her breakup.
8	8	"Til Death Do Us Part"	December 28, 2010
Joel and Mike marry in Iowa joined by family members. Sarah surprises them by making it to the ceremony. Rosebud and Sahil argue some more over Sahil's level of support over her breakup. Later he invites her to a poetry reading, where he performs a poem by way of apology. David has head shots taken in pursuit of an acting career. Nathan and Crystal are relieved that the surrogacy question is behind them and devote themselves to producing the movie based on Crystal's book. In closing, each of the friends interviews about their relationships and how important their friends are in their lives.

=== Season 2 (2011–12) ===
No. overall	No. in series	Title	Original release date
9	1	"Naughty or Nice?"	November 18, 2011
10	2	"Let's Get This Party Started"	November 18, 2011
11	3	"Too Heavy, Too Hard, Too Fast"	November 25, 2011
Brent takes Jared on a date but his excessive drinking and behavior make a poor impression. The next morning Brent misses a meeting with Olivia; he has been taken to a hospital after passing out on his front porch. Brent blames a bad reaction to botox but Olivia remains worried about his alcohol use. Shane is also concerned, meeting with Brent regarding his calling Danny Gokey gay in his toast. Kristin has a blood test for pregnancy. It is negative but she still believes she is pregnant.
12	4	"Dealing With Some Demons"	December 2, 2011
Shane invites Sherrié, Tenisha and Jared to his home for Bible study. He shocks them with the revelations that he is unsure whether he was born gay, that he would become straight if he could and that while he wants children, he hates the idea of bringing children into the world and forcing them to deal with having two fathers. Sherrié speaks with him privately later and then takes him to meet a gay pastor. Peter holds Kristin's hand while she takes a home pregnancy test. The test comes up positive.
13	5	"The Sex Video"	December 9, 2011
Tenisha is concerned that Jared is having casual sex with multiple partners. At the Nashville Pride Festival she discusses the situation with Peter, who suggests he is going through a normal phase of being a newly-single gay man. Tenisha tries to speak with Jared about her concerns. He feels she is constantly saying the same things to him and they argue. Olivia and Brent see Peter's stand-up act to see if he would make a suitable emcee for a charity event. Olivia finds him too raunchy but Brent offers him the job without consulting her. Chagrined at the situation, Olivia advises Peter he has to do a clean set. Later Olivia confronts Brent about how his drinking is affecting their professional relationship but he refuses to discuss it.
14	6	"He Sucks Me In"	December 16, 2011
15	7	"Clean, Sexy & Classy"	December 23, 2011
16	8	"Train Wreck"	December 30, 2011
17	9	"Get Out of My House"	January 6, 2012
18	10	"A Dirty Word"	January 13, 2012
19	11	"Crash & Burn"	January 20, 2012
20	12	"Intervention"	February 27, 2012

== Reception ==
Ellen Gray of The Philadelphia Daily News found Girls to be similar in tone to the series Will & Grace and pondered whether a reality version of that show was necessary. Despite that, the News found the lack of "manufactured" drama a positive change from other similar reality programs. The New York Daily News's Richard Huff, also comparing Girls Who Like Boys Who Like Boys to the "groundbreaking" Will & Grace, labels Girls Who Like Boys Who Like Boys "mind-breaking". It has moments, sure, but never enough to make it memorable or a winner." The lack of "reality-show trappings" like "table flipping" and "hair-extension pulling", he writes, means that the series needs "some humor, drama and good storytelling" and Girls Who Like Boys Who Like Boys lacks these qualities. Hank Stuever of The Washington Post cites a "curiously sad tone" that pervades Girls Who Like Boys Who Like Boys. "The show often seems at cross-purposes," he continues, "as if the producers had a clear idea of what sort of peppy project they wanted to film and then picked the wrong people to follow around."

Troy Patterson of Slate.com calls the series "intriguingly ridiculous". Girls Who Like Boys Who Like Boys, he writes, seeks to be a serious show but in trying to be serious it "betrays its core triviality". Brent Hartinger of the gay-interest website TheBacklot.com writes that it is "a smart, watchable show". Acknowledging the Will & Grace-like premise, Hartinger notes that the series quickly deals with the similarities and "becomes about four very specific pairings, each of which is interesting and unique in its own way. Better still, none of the relationships is perfect, and only one is what might you think of when you think of this type of relationship". Joel Derfner, a co-star of season one of the show, has publicly criticized the show's producers for their editing and manipulation of statements and sentiments, which sometimes ended up on air as the opposite of fact.
