= Jiuqu Xi =

River in Fujian, China

Jiuqu Xi Jiuqu River
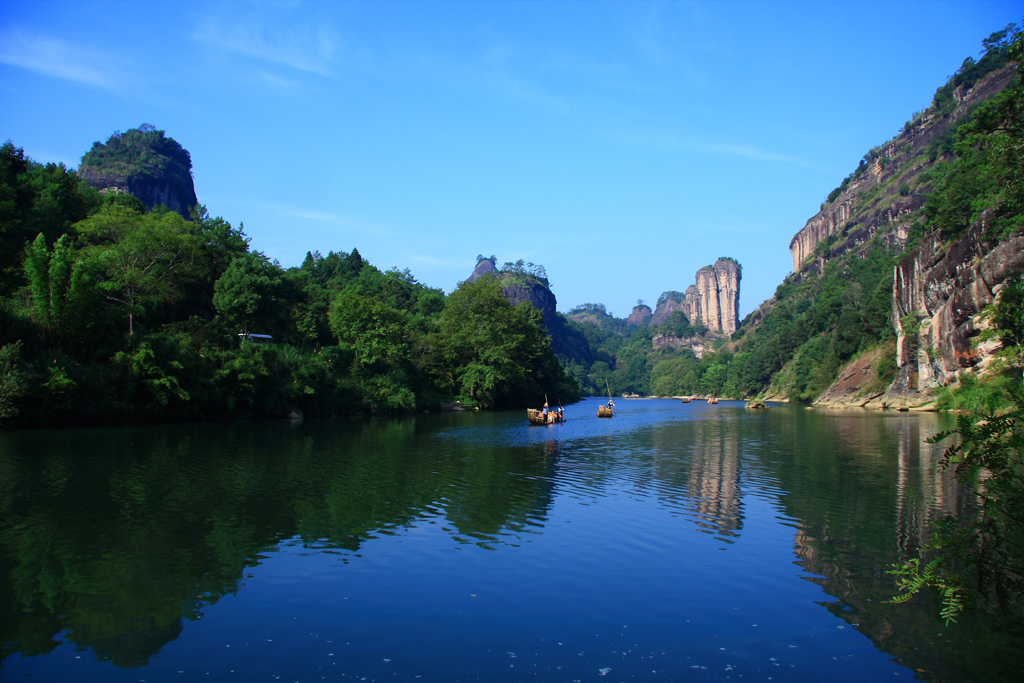
- View from the river

- Location of the mouth Jiuqu Xi (Eastern China)
- Etymology: Nine-bend river
- Native name: 武夷山

Location
- Country: China
- Region(s): Fujian and Jiangxi

Physical characteristics
- Source
  - coordinates: 27°49′16″N 117°42′11″E
- Mouth
  - coordinates: 27°38′29″N 117°58′09″E
- Length: 60 km (37 mi)

UNESCO World Heritage Site
- Official name: Mount Wuyi
- Type: Mixed
- Criteria: iii, vi, vii, x
- Designated: 1999 (23rd session), modified 2017
- Reference no.: 911bis
- Region: Asia-Pacific

Jiuqu Xi
- Chinese: 九曲溪
- Literal meaning: Nine-bend river
Transcriptions
Standard Mandarin
- Hanyu Pinyin: Jiǔqū xī

Jade Girl Peak (right) on the Jiuqu Xi (Nine-bend River), Wuyi Mountains, 1871

The Jiuqu Xi River or Jiuqu River is the river rising in the Wuyi Mountains (formerly known as Bohea Hills in early Western documents). The river and the mountain range are located in the prefecture of Nanping, in northern Fujian province, near the border with Jiangxi province, China. The region is known worldwide as a refugium for several rare and endemic plant species, its river valleys and the abundance of important temples and archeological sites, earning the area a UNESCO World Heritage Site status.

The Jiuqu Xi River is about 60 km (37 mi) long, meandering in a deep gorge among these hills. In most places, it is a slow, shallow stream navigable only by small craft like rowboats and canoes. However, the river narrows at one point to just a few meters but a depth of 80 metres (260 ft).

== See also ==
- Jiuzhaigou Valley
- Huangguoshu Waterfall
