= Joel Derfner =

American writer and composer

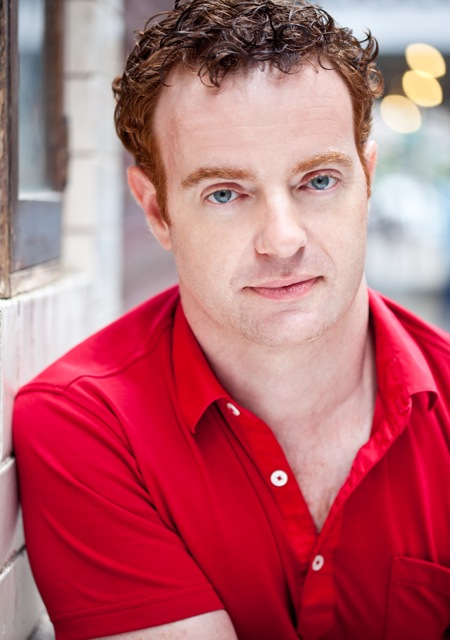
- Born: January 12, 1973 (age 53); Washington D.C., U.S.
- Education: Harvard University (BA); New York University (MFA)
- Occupations: Author, composer
- Known for: Gay Haiku (2005); Swish (2008); Lawfully Wedded Husband (2013)

Joel Derfner (born January 12, 1973) is an American writer and composer. He is the author of three gay-themed books: Gay Haiku (2005), Swish: My Quest to Become the Gayest Person Ever and What Ended Up Happening Instead (2008), and Lawfully Wedded Husband: How My Gay Marriage Will Save the American Family (2013). His articles have appeared in publications including the Huffington Post, The Advocate, Time Out New York, and Between the Lines. Derfner and his works have been cited as references on gay culture, and he has been noted as one of "today's best-known gay writers".

He is the composer of several musicals, and he teaches musical theater composition at New York University's Tisch School of the Arts. Derfner was also co-star of the first season of the 2010 reality television show Girls Who Like Boys Who Like Boys, along with his close friend Sarah Rose.

== Early life and education ==
Derfner was born in 1973 in Washington, D.C. and grew up in Charleston, South Carolina. His parents were civil rights activists, and were active in Mississippi during the Civil Rights Movement. His father, Armand Derfner, is a civil rights lawyer, and his mother Mary Frances Derfner (née Seddon) met Armand when she became his legal secretary in Washington, D.C. in 1967. Joel's father is Jewish and his mother was Christian; he was raised Jewish and converted to Judaism at the age of seven. His mother, who suffered from type 1 diabetes, died in 1992. Joel came out to his parents as gay when he was 15.

He attended Porter-Gaud School, where he excelled academically and was class valedictorian. He was also an avid singer, and considered singing as a career until his junior year of college, when severe gastric reflux numbed the back of his throat.

Attending Harvard University, he became treasurer of the Bisexual, Gay and Lesbian Students Association in 1992, and participated in other LGBT support groups and events. He also participated in the Harvard College Opera (then called the Dunster House Opera) as a singer and vocal coach. In 1995 he graduated with honors with a B.A. in linguistics. He moved to New York City in 1997 to study musical theater composition, and in 1999 obtained an M.F.A. in musical theater writing from New York University's Tisch School of the Arts.

== Career ==
=== Books and other writings ===
Derfner's first book, Gay Haiku (2005), had its inception during a musical-theater fundraising event in which, as an avid blogger, he was to post a blog entry every half hour for 24 hours. He later explained, "I realized I could write 49 haiku about all the bad dates I'd been on and all the bad sex I'd had. They turned out pretty well, so I decided to write 20 more, which took me another week, and send them out as a manuscript called 69 Gay Haiku. Eventually Random House wanted it, but they needed 110 total, so I had to write 41 more." The Advocate called the book "clever, hilarious, and even poignant snapshots of urban gay life, from the sublime ... to the ridiculous.... Priceless!" and named it one of their "Top 20 Picks for Summer Reading" for 2005.

In hopes of writing another book, after the publication of Gay Haiku Derfner asked his editor what he would be interested in, and was told that since his bio on Gay Haiku said "In an attempt to be the gayest person ever, he took up knitting and got a job as a step aerobics instructor" he should write a book of essays about trying to become the gayest person ever. This endeavor, also published by Random House, became Swish: My Quest to Become the Gayest Person Ever and What Ended Up Happening Instead (2008), an autobiographical book that is by turns witty, serious, and emotionally self-revelatory. A portion of the book was excerpted in The Advocate. Elton John contacted Derfner saying that he loved the book; he contributed the foreword to its subsequent editions, and for the book's front cover wrote that "Swish is the best book about being gay I've ever read. But it's not just about being gay; it's about being human." The book was nominated for a Lambda Literary Award for Best Gay Memoir/Biography at the 21st Lambda Literary Awards. Swish was also selected as a Stonewall Honor Book in Non-Fiction by the American Library Association's Stonewall Book Awards in 2009.

His third book, Lawfully Wedded Husband: How My Gay Marriage Will Save the American Family, was published in September 2013. The autobiographical book explores many facets of both his and others' marriages, relationships, and families, including same-sex marriages. Derfner offers research and analysis as well as intimate revelations of his own relationship's ups and downs, offset with humor and the details of a reality show he participated in. The book was published by University of Wisconsin Press as part of their "Living Out" LGBT autobiography series. Segments of it have been anthologized at The New Civil Rights Movement. Lambda Literary gave the work high praise, calling it "a compelling memoir of love and family enriched by social history, politics, and sharp commentary on the state of our popular culture", and noting that "[Derfner] defines marriage as: 'an arrangement whereby, in pledging publicly to take care of each other, previously unrelated people become a family. ... The word marriage means family.'"

Derfner also collaborated with Jackson Galaxy on his 2012 memoir Cat Daddy, and with Lisa J. Edwards on her 2012 book, A Dog Named Boo. His articles have appeared in the Huffington Post, The Advocate, Time Out New York, and Between the Lines, and his original piece "De Anima" was anthologized in the 2009 compendium Fool For Love: New Gay Fiction.

=== Composition and musical theater ===
==== Signs of Life ====
Derfner's first major musical was Signs of Life, with lyrics by Len Schiff and book by Peter Ullian. The work, about a Nazi concentration camp in Terezín, Czechoslovakia, was originally called Terezin. It is the true story of the Theresienstadt concentration camp, which was the subject of a 1944 Nazi propaganda film created to deceive the world by portraying it as a model academic and artistic community. He has stated, "Bizarrely, Terezin became a cultural capital of Europe because the Nazis sent all these artists and intellectuals and all the musicians there." Commenting on the creation of the play, he said, "You can't tell a story about injustice and cruelty; you have to tell a story about people."

The production was commissioned in 2000 by Virginia Criste, whose grandparents died in the camp. She brought together Derfner, Schiff, and Ullian, and as the musical took shape it had several developmental readings in New York City from 2003 to 2005, and a series of concerts at Symphony Space in February 2006. It was further developed in Seattle, with workshop readings in June 2006 and a full developmental production in June 2007.

Under its new name, Signs of Life, the musical had its world premiere Off-Broadway at the Marjorie S. Deane Little Theatre, in a limited run from February 25 through March 21, 2010. Backstage wrote that "The most intriguing contribution comes from composer Joel Derfner, whose music is always memorable and thoughtfully conceived, especially a moving number for the German officer Heindel ... that builds from hymnlike simplicity to full fury as he stakes out his morals." The musical was also performed in the Czech Republic in the summer of 2013, and it had its Chicago premiere in October 2013.

==== Other musicals and songs ====
Derfner's other musicals include Blood Drive, a combination of three interrelated musical short stories about both made and missed connections, with book and lyrics by Rachel Sheinkin. It has played at the Bridewell Theatre in London in 2003 and at the Eugene O'Neill Theater in 2005. He has musicalized his memoir Swish (lyrics by Dan Marshall, book by Tim Acito), and it was performed at New York Theatre Barn in April 2013. He also writes cabaret songs, including songs with his own lyrics such as "A Day in the Life" and "Backwards Day". Early in his career he composed the music for a 2001 Washington D.C.–area production of Shakespeare's Love's Labour's Lost.

Derfner is on the faculty of the Graduate Musical Theater Writing Program at New York University.

=== Television appearances ===
Derfner co-starred in the first season of the 2010 Sundance Channel reality television show Girls Who Like Boys Who Like Boys, along with his best friend Sarah Rose, a travel and nonfiction writer whom he met at Harvard in the early 1990s. One of the show's producers knew him from musical theater writing circles, and suggested he audition for the show. On the strength of his book Swish, and his imminent marriage to his fiancé Mike, he and Rose were cast. The show filmed from February through May 2010, including Derfner's legal marriage in Iowa, and aired beginning in December 2010. He has since publicly criticized the show's producers for their editing and manipulation of statements and sentiments, which sometimes ended up on air as the opposite of fact.

In 2012 he also appeared on the PBS LGBT show In the Life.

== Personal life ==
Derfner lives in New York City with his husband, Mike Combs, a psychiatrist who runs an inpatient unit at a New York City psychiatric hospital. He and Combs became engaged in 2007. The couple were legally married in Iowa in May 2010 and had their formal wedding ceremony in October 2010 in Brooklyn Botanic Garden.

== Bibliography ==
- Gay Haiku. Broadway Books. 2005.
- Swish: My Quest to Become the Gayest Person Ever and What Ended Up Happening Instead. Broadway Books, 2008.
- Lawfully Wedded Husband: How My Gay Marriage Will Save the American Family. University of Wisconsin Press, 2013.
