= The Brides of Sodom =

- Film poster
- Directed by: Creep Creepersin
- Written by: Creep Creepersin
- Starring: Domiziano Arcangeli; David Taylor; Rachel Zeskind
- Cinematography: Andrew Ceperly; Matt Fiore
- Edited by: Creep Creepersin
- Release date: January 29, 2013
- Running time: 119 minutes
- Country: United States
- Language: English

The Brides of Sodom is an American horror film that was written and directed by Creep Creepersin. The film starred Domiziano Arcangeli, David Taylor and Rachel Zeskind. The Brides of Sodom was produced by Empire Films and Sterling Entertainment and features gay-for-pay porn idol, David Taylor in his first main role in a feature film.

== Plot ==
After the world has ended, a group of vampires feed on the last remaining humans left on the planet. Confusion arises when one of the lead vampires falls in love with a human that is meant for food.

== Cast ==
- Domiziano Arcangeli
- David Taylor
- Rachel Zeskind
- Dylan Vox
- Beverly Lynne
- Peter Stickles
- Quentin Elias
- Robin Bain
- Jacqui Holland
- Tara Alexis
- Jess Allen
- Esther Canata
- Elina Madison
- Shon Lange
- Brad Potts
- Dahlia Dark
- Marta Zolynska
- Jeffrey James Lippold
- Krista Jacobson
