= Matt Riddlehoover =

American filmmaker (born 1985)

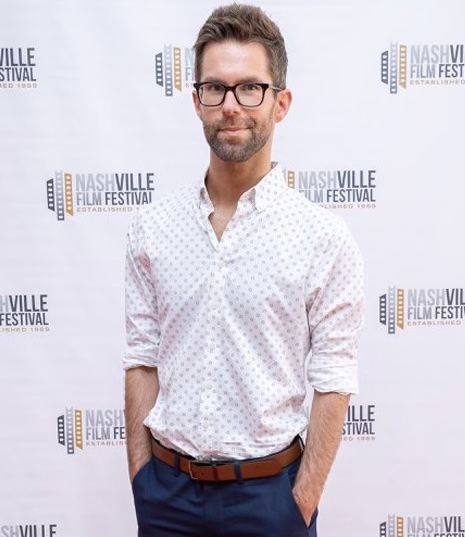
- Riddlehoover in 2018
- Born: July 26, 1985 (age 41); Bermuda
- Occupations: Producer, director, editor
- Years active: 2006–present
- Spouse: Dustin Tittle (m. 2014)
- Website: www.mattriddlehoover.com

Matt Riddlehoover (born July 26, 1985) is an American filmmaker. He is best known for the 2020 documentary My Darling Vivian.

== My Darling Vivian ==
Riddlehoover produced, directed, and edited My Darling Vivian, a biographical documentary about Vivian Liberto, the first wife of Johnny Cash. The film premiered at the 2020 South by Southwest Film Festival, presented by Amazon Prime Video, to great acclaim. It was hailed by The Hollywood Reporter and the Los Angeles Times as a "must-see" critics' pick, and Newsweek ranked it among the best films of the year. My Darling Vivian went on to screen at festivals around the world, including Geena Davis' Bentonville Film Festival, where Riddlehoover received the Special Jury Award for Excellence in Editing.

== Selected filmography ==
Year	Film	Director	Writer	Producer	Editor
2027	Monty and the Movies	Yes		Yes	Yes
2020	My Darling Vivian	Yes		Yes	Yes
2018	Strategy and Pursuit	Yes	Yes	Yes	Yes
2016	What's the Matter with Gerald?	Yes	Yes	Yes	Yes
2015	Paternity Leave	Yes	Yes	Yes	Yes
2014	More Scenes from a Gay Marriage	Yes	Yes	Yes	Yes
2013	West Hollywood Motel	Yes	Yes	Yes	Yes
2012	Scenes from a Gay Marriage	Yes	Yes	Yes	Yes
2010	Gaze	Yes		Yes	Yes
2008	Bookends	Yes	Yes	Yes	Yes
2006	To a Tee	Yes	Yes	Yes	Yes

== Awards and nominations ==
=== Film festival awards ===
Year	Festival	Film	Award	Result
2020	In-Edit Chile	My Darling Vivian	Audience Award	Won
2020	Bentonville Film Festival	My Darling Vivian	Special Jury Award for Excellence in Editing	Won
2020	Bentonville Film Festival	My Darling Vivian	Jury Award - Best Documentary	Nominated
2020	Cleveland International Film Festival	My Darling Vivian	Music Movies Competition	Nominated
2020	SXSW Film Festival	My Darling Vivian	Audience Award - 24 Beats Per Second	Nominated
