= Tieluohan tea =

Chinese oolong tea

Tieluohan, 铁罗汉
- Type: Oolong
- Other names: Iron Arhat, 鉄羅漢
- Origin: Mount Wuyi, Fujian Province, China
- Quick description: Light Wuyi Tea

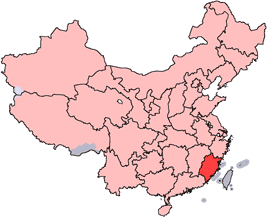
Tieluohan tea is grown in Fujian province, China.

Tieluohan or Tie Luo Han (simplified Chinese: 铁罗汉; traditional Chinese: 鐵羅漢; pinyin: tiěluóhàn; pronounced [tʰjè.lwǒ.xân]) is one of the Four Great Oolongs and a light Wuyi tea. Tieluohan is an oolong tea and the cultivar responsible for one of the four best known Yán chá, "rock teas" grown on cliffs in the Wuyi Mountains in northern Fujian Province, China. Legend tells that this tea was created by a powerful warrior monk with golden-bronze skin, hence the name Tieluohan, which means "Iron Arhat" or "Iron Warrior Monk".

The color of the leaf is an intense green and the resulting tea is of a lighter color. The taste of the tea should be full-bodied and supple, with gentle floral notes and the traditional long-lasting finish.

== See also ==
- Four Great Oolongs (Si Da Ming Cong)
