= Paternity Leave (film) =

- Directed by: Matt Riddlehoover
- Written by: Matt Riddlehoover; Dustin Tittle
- Produced by: Cameron McCasland
- Starring: Jacob York; Charlie David; Chris Salvatore
- Cinematography: Josh Ickes
- Production companies: Element Twenty Two; Red Headed Revolution
- Distributed by: Border2Border
- Release date: April 19, 2015 (Nashville Film Festival)
- Running time: 90 minutes
- Country: United States
- Language: English

Paternity Leave is a 2015 romantic comedy film directed by Matt Riddlehoover and starring Jacob York, Charlie David, and Chris Salvatore. Principal photography of the film began on September 1, 2014, in Nashville, Tennessee. It made its world premiere at the Nashville Film Festival on April 19, 2015.

== Premise ==
A man finds out that he's pregnant with his partner's baby. Dumbstruck by the news, their relationship takes twists and turns through hardship and hilarity.
