= Sarah Rose =

American historian

- Born: Chicago
- Education: University of Chicago; Harvard University; UCLS
- Occupations: Author, Journalist
- Known for: D-Day Girls, For All the Tea in China
- Television: Girls Who Like Boys Who Like Boys
- Awards: New York Foundation for the Arts
- Website: sarahrose.com

Sarah Rose (born 1974) is an author and journalist known for D-Day Girls and For All the Tea in China.

== Early life and education ==
Rose was born in Chicago and attended the University of Chicago Laboratory Schools, Harvard College, and the University of Chicago. She lives in New York.

== Books and television ==
Rose's newest book, D-Day Girls, was published in April 2019 and debuted at #11 on the Indie Bestseller List and #6 on The Washington Post Paperback Bestseller List. It tells the story of women who were infiltrated into France ahead of D-Day to arm and train the French resistance by the secret British agency, SOE. Author Erik Larson called it, "Gripping...Spies, romance, Gestapo thugs, blown-up trains, courage, and treachery (lots of treachery) —and all of it true." Foreign Policy said, “D-Day Girls, written with novelistic detail, weaves together five women’s narratives using historical research from contemporary periodicals, archives, and interview records. . . [D-Day Girls is part of] a new library and a more robust approach to analyzing women’s essential role in war.” The Washington Post said, “Equal parts espionage-romance thriller and historical narrative, D-Day Girls traces the lives and secret activities of the 39 women who answered the call to infiltrate France. . . . While chronicling the James Bond-worthy missions and love affairs of these women, Rose vividly captures the broken landscape of war.”

Rose's first book, For All the Tea in China, was published in 2009, and tells the story of Robert Fortune, the nineteenth-century Scottish botanist who, in stealing tea plants and seeds from Qing China, committed "the greatest act of industrial espionage in history." Guy Raz, of National Public Radio's All Things Considered, called it "a wonderful combination of scholarship and storytelling," and the Associated Press said it was "a story that should appeal to readers who want to be transported on a historic journey laced with suspense, science, and adventure." The book received awards from BBC Radio (as "Book of the Week"), Booklist, Strategy+Business, AudioFile, and elsewhere. Huw Bowen, Professor for history at Swansea University, criticized the book due to its "basic errors adding to serial misconception and misunderstanding" in his review for the Guardian. Jonathan Spence, noted China scholar at Yale University disagreed, "In this lively account of the adventures (and misadventures) that lay behind Robert Fortune's bold acquisition of Chinese tea seedlings for transplanting in British India, Sarah Rose demonstrates in engaging detail how botany and empire-building went hand in hand."

In 2010–11 Rose co-starred, along with her close friend Joel Derfner, on the reality television series Girls Who Like Boys Who Like Boys, which follows the lives of four women in New York City and their gay male best friends. The show debuted on the Sundance Channel in December 2010.

== Journalism ==
Rose was The Wall Street Journal's Dynasties columnist, writing a bi-weekly news column covering New York's billionaire real estate families. Her features have appeared in major newspapers and magazines such as The Washington Post, Outside, Chicago Sun-Times, Toronto Globe and Mail, The Economist, Men's Journal, Bon Appetit, National Geographic Traveler, Travel+Leisure, Departures, The New York Post and many others. Rose also wrote a humor column about dating for Saturday Evening Post and Men's Fitness. She was awarded the North American Travel Journalists Association Grand Prize in Writing and a Lowell Thomas Award. She was also a grant winner from New York Foundation for the Arts.

== Books ==
- For All the Tea In China (2009) ISBN 0091797063
- D-Day Girls (2019) ISBN 978-0451495082.

== Television ==
Year	Title	Role	Notes
2010–2011	Girls Who Like Boys Who Like Boys	Herself	
