= Da Hong Pao =

Type of tea

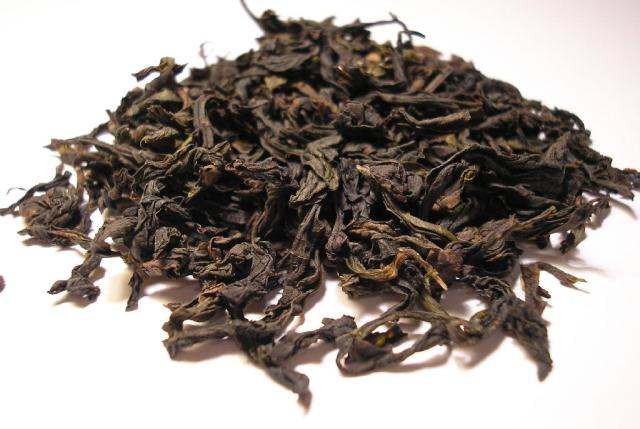
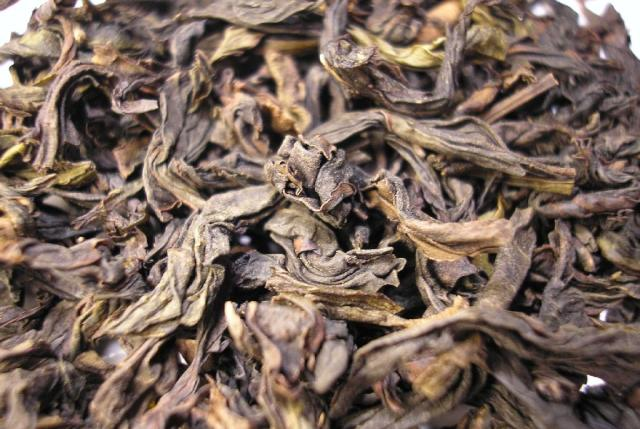
- Type: Oolong
- Origin: Wuyi Mountains, Fujian Province, China

Da Hong Pao
- Traditional Chinese: 大紅袍
- Simplified Chinese: 大红袍
- Literal meaning: Big Red Robe
Transcriptions
Standard Mandarin
- Hanyu Pinyin: Dà Hóng Páo
- Wade–Giles: Ta4 Hung2 P'ao2
- IPA: [tâ.xʊ̌ŋ.pʰǎʊ]

Da Hong Pao (Big Red Robe, 大红袍) is a Wuyi rock tea grown in the Wuyi Mountains of Fujian Province, China. Da Hong Pao has a unique orchid fragrance and a long-lasting sweet aftertaste. Dry Da Hong Pao has a shape like tightly knotted ropes or slightly twisted strips, and is green and brown in color. After brewing, the tea is orange-yellow, bright, and clear. Da Hong Pao can retain its flavor for nine steepings. The tea is often known to be extremely expensive.

== Brew ==
A traditional way to brew Da Hong Pao is by using a Purple Clay Teapot and 100 °C (212 °F) water. Purified water is considered by some to be the best choice to brew Da Hong Pao. The boiled water should be used immediately after boiling. Boiling the water for a long time or storing it for a long time after boiling will influence the taste of the Da Hong Pao. The third and fourth steeping are considered by some to have the best taste.

== Production ==
There are seven steps needed to make Da Hong Pao.

1. 采摘 (picking): Da Hong Pao is picked once a year, generally in May and June. The standard for fresh leaf picking is 1 bud with 2—3 leaves.
2. 萎凋 (withering): The picked tea leaves are spread evenly in the sun, using sunlight and breeze to evaporate the water.
3. 凉青 (cooling): After withering, the tea leaves are moved inside and cooled down.
4. 做青 (making): The tea leaves are shaken and rolled in a big bamboo sieve. This may be conducive to the oxidation of polyphenols inside the tea leaves. This step is the most crucial part to form the fragrance, taste, and rhyme of Da Hong Pao. And it is also the most complicated and time-consuming step.
5. 炒青 (stir-fry): There are two types of stir-fry, hand stir-fry and mechanical stir-fry leaves. The pot temperature of hand stir-fry is between 140–160 °C (284–320 °F). People put on gloves and keep turning over the tea leaves with hands. The pot temperature of mechanical stir-fry is between 220–260 °C (428–500 °F), no hands needed.
6. 揉捻 (kneading): There are two types of kneading, hand kneading and mechanical kneading. By kneading, rolling, and twisting, the tea leaves will form a cord shape.
7. 烘培 (baking): This step includes putting the tea in a big basket and using different temperatures to heat and dry the leaves, which usually takes hours.

== Price and value ==
The best Da Hong Pao are from the mother Da Hong Pao tea trees. Mother Da Hong Pao tea trees have thousands of years of history. There are only 6 mother trees remaining on the stiff cliff of Jiulongyu (Wuyi Mountains), which is considered a rare treasure. Because of its scarcity and superior tea quality, Da Hong Pao is known as the "King of Tea". In 2006, the Wuyi city government insured these 6 mother trees with a value of 100 million RMB. In the same year, the Wuyi city government also decided to prohibit anyone from privately collecting teas from the mother Da Hong Pao tea trees. One of the last batch of Da Hong Pao harvested and made from the mother trees has been collected in the Palace Museum in Beijing. 20g of Da Hong Pao tea from one of the mother plants was sold for ¥208,000 in 2005. It is the highest auction record for Da Hong Pao.

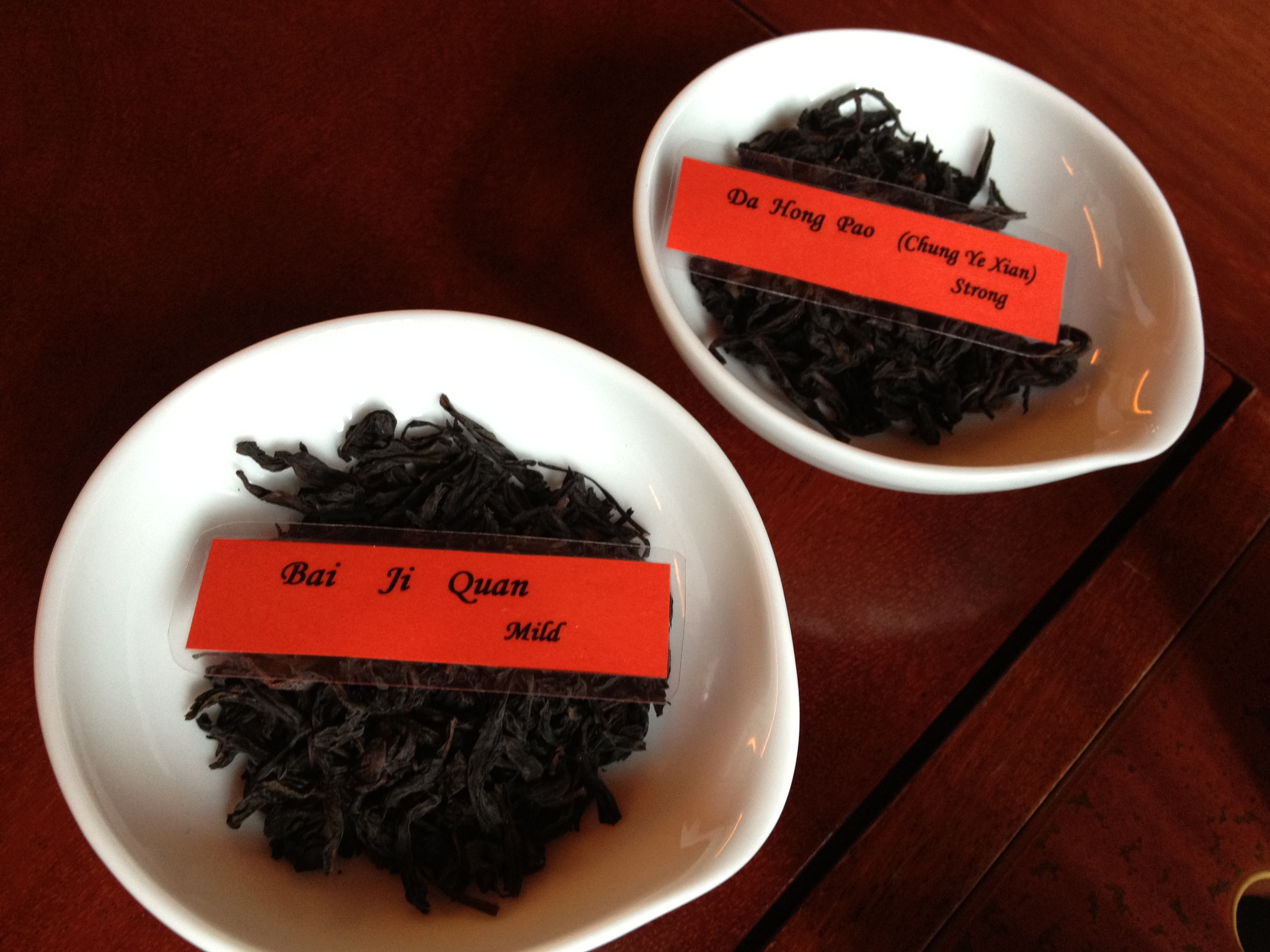
Samples of Da Hong Pao

The majority of Da Hong Pao on the market now are artificially-bred, which maintained the characteristics of the Da Hong Pao. It is much cheaper than Da Hong Pao from the mother tea trees. The price depends heavily on its quality.

== Origin of the name ==
There are numerous legends surrounding the origin of Da Hong Pao's name. Among them, the most renowned recounts a tale from long ago about a scholar who fell ill while traveling to Beijing for an exam. A monk from Tianxin Temple discovered him and prepared a bowl of tea made from leaves harvested from Wuyi Mountain. After drinking the tea, the scholar experienced a significant improvement in his health and vitality. A few days later, he won first place in the exam. So he came back to the temple to thank the monk who saved him. Later, he also used this tea to cure the emperor's illness. The emperor rewarded the scholar with a red robe and asked the scholar to put the red robe on the tea tree. The red robe was considered a high honor at that time. The emperor also gave orders that all officials passing through this place must put their red robes on the tea trees to show the emperor's gratitude for his healing. After that, the tea trees were named Da Hong Pao, or "Big Red Robe" in Mandarin.

== Cultural importance ==
In the Qing dynasty, Da Hong Pao often ranked first in the local tea trade competitions and won the title of "King of the tea." Local people were required to worship Da Hong Pao using animals, flowers, and fruits before picking the tea leaves every year.

During the Republic of China, the price of a pound of Da Hong Pao could buy 5,000 pounds of rice or ten buffaloes.

After the People's Republic of China was established, the procedures for making Da Hong Pao were especially strict. Every worker involved in picking or making the tea went through political vetting. After checking and ensuring the quality, the Da Hong Pao was sent to Beijing and was received by Mao Zedong.

When President of the United States Richard Nixon visited China in 1972, Mao Zedong gifted him 200g of Da Hong Pao, which represented peace and friendship between China and the United States.

== See also ==
- List of Chinese teas
