= Peter Depp =

Peter Depp (born July 26, 1981) is an American stand-up comedian, gay rights activist, anti-bullying activist, writer, and actor best known for his role in Sundance Channel’s GLAAD-nominated and acclaimed hit show Girls Who Like Boys Who Like Boys. He’s also known for his Huffington Post article, “Being A Gay Dad.”

== Early life ==
Depp was born July 26, 1981, in Glen Cove, New York, to Sheryl and Gary Depp, a New York Police officer. He has one sister named Stephanie. As a child, he struggled with his sexuality.

== Career ==
In March 1, 2012, Peter and his best friend were featured in Nashville Scene as 2012's Power Couple for the 2012 People Issue.
