= Creep Creepersin =

American singer

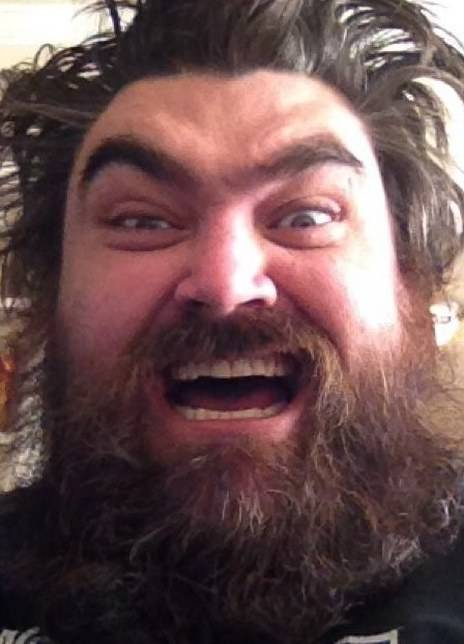

Background information
- Also known as: Skrotar the Conqueror
- Born: Matt Wall; March 13, 1978 (age 48); Anaheim, California, U.S.
- Genres: gothic rock folk country gothic industrial
- Occupations: Musician, songwriter, screenwriter, filmmaker, film producer, author, actor
- Instrument: Vocals
- Years active: 2004–present
- Member of: Creepersin; The Sci-Fi Originals
- Website: creepersin.com

Matt Wall (born March 13, 1978), known professionally as Creep Creepersin, is an American film director, musician, screenwriter, producer, actor, and author.

He founded the horror punk/goth band Creepersin and also the electro punk band The Sci-Fi Originals. Creepersin has also had a prolific career as a film maker creating films such as O.C. Babes and the Slasher of Zombietown, Vaginal Holocaust, Caged Lesbos A Go Go, Orgy of Blood and The Brothers Cannibal.

== Early life and education ==
Matt Wall was born on March 13, 1978, in Anaheim, California and attended Cypress High School.

== Career ==
=== Creepersin (2004–present) ===
Creepersin is an American horror punk/goth rock band that was formed in Orange County, California. Creepersin was known for loud guitars (as in "Last House on the Left on Mockingbird Lane") and sleepy vocals (as in "Proceed with Plan 9"). Their lyrics are mostly inspired by old horror and exploitation films such as The Last House on the Left, I Spit on Your Grave, and even classic T.V. shows like The Munsters. After forming his own record label, Creepsville Entertainment, Creepersin put out two full-length albums (The Rise of Creepersin 2005, Faster Creepersin Kill Kill 2006) an EP (Creepersin's Final Chapter 2007) and a collection of hits and demos entitled House of Creepersin (2008). Creepersin Re-Animated was released in November 2011. The band supported the album with their first U.S. tour. They documented the tour and will release the DVD in 2012 entitled, Reanimated Roadkill. The band is recording their new full-length album right now called Creepersin Lovecamp 69 which will be out in October 2012. An EP called Venus Attacks Creepersin that has some tracks from the new album plus outtakes from the Lovecamp sessions including the theme song from Creep's short Cannibal Blood Girl due out on April 13, 2012.

==== Band members ====
Current lineup

- Creep Creepersin – Lead vocals, Guitar, Bass, Drums (2004–present)
- G. Graves – Lead Guitar, Backup Vocals (2010–present)
- Zom-D – Bass, Backup Vocals (2011–present)
- Gregyard – Drums (2011–present)

Previous members

- Mrs. Creep – Keyboards (2006–2011)
- Norman Mop – Guitar (2004–2006)
- Mr. Mundo – Drums (2004–2005)
- El Hombre – drums (2005)
- The Shank – bass (2004)
- Rocky Horrornandez – bass (2004–2005)
- Stitchblade – drums (2005)
- Skelly – drums (2006–2007)
- Salvez – bass (2005)
- Paula Fright – bass (one show in 2006)
- Barnabas – guitar (one show in 2006)

===== Discography =====
- The Following Preview is Rated R (2004)
- The Rise of Creepersin (2005)
- Klatu Verada Creepersin (2006)
- Faster Creepersin Kill Kill (2006)
- Creepersin's Final Chapter (2007)
- House of Creepersin (2008)
- Creepersin Has Risen From the Grave (2011)
- Creepersin ReAnimated (2011)
- Venus Attacks Creepersin (2012)

Compilations and Soundtracks

- WHN: The Horror of it All Volume 1 (2005)
- WHN: The Horror of it All Volume 2 (2006)
- Welcome to Creepsville (2006)
- Killing Spree soundtrack (2006)
- Frankienstein soundtrack (2008)
- O.C. Babes and the Slasher of Zombietown soundtrack (2009)
- Erection Soundtrack (2009)
- Triple Threat of Terror (2011)

=== The Sci-Fi Originals (2006–present) ===
Creep and his bandmate Nikki took on the roles of Skrotar the Conqueror and Clitora the Destroyer to form The Sci-Fi Originals, two aliens from Uranus that have come to enslave Earth. Their only release was the 2007 album Uranus Will Rule You.

==== Band members ====
- Creep Creepersin as Skrotar the Conqueror – guitar and vocals (2006–present)
- Nikki as Clitora the Destroyer – keyboards and drum machine (2006 – present)

===== Discography =====
- Uranus Will Rule You (2007)

=== Solo career (2006–present) ===
Creep's solo recordings have been a mesh of outlaw country to folk to industrial. The three solo albums that have come out have volume numbers (Volume 13: Folk Songs for the Dead, Volume 4: The Untimely Death of Spade 13, Volume 9: Flowers for Nikki) indicate that there are more albums to come. In a radio interview on the Independent Corner, Creep said "For my solo work, there are 15 volumes that are ready to go, its just when i get around to them i guess is when we will hear them."

==== Band members ====
- Creep Creepersin – Vocals and guitar (2006–present)
- Jimi Blackstone – lead guitar
- Johnny Strotman – bass
- Marty Foltz – drums

===== Discography =====
- Volume 13: Folk Songs for the Dead (2006)
- Volume 4: The Untimely Death of Spade 13 (2007)
- Volume 9: Flowers for Nikki (2008)

=== Film career ===
Creep's directorial debut was for his own music video, Meet Me Out in the Sticks in 2005. In 2006 he wrote and directed the short films The Room Mate, Michelle, The Bedroom, A Night With the Outlaw and the music videos for his songs I Need More Blood and Dead, Dead, Dead, Dead, Dead, Dead, Dead, Dead. In late 2006, Creep wrote and directed his first feature film, Creep Creepersin's Frankenstein. After moving back to Orange County, California from Eugene, Oregon in 2007, Creep directed the web series Decomposing Jack with future frequent collaborator Matty Thunders. In 2008 Creep wrote and directed his second feature O.C. Babes and the Slasher of Zombietown on a shoestring budget and an 8-hour shoot. Maxim Media International picked up the film and released it in 2009 on their new Midnight Releasing label.

The last part of 2008, Creep wrote and directed 2 more films Erection and He. Creepersin took his older short films and also released a collection entitled Creep Creepersin's Creepshow.

2009 saw a large number of Creepersin films like Vaginal Holocaust, Peeping Blog, Orgy of Blood, Caged Lesbos A Go Go, Sexual Violence in Cinema, Ding Dong Dead and of course The Corporate Cut Throat Massacre. The end of 2009 saw Shoreline Entertainment pick up Vaginal Holocaust, Caged Lesbos A Go Go and Orgy of Blood.

In January 2010, Creep finished shooting his latest film The Brothers Cannibal. Creepersin is in pre-production of his new film The Brides of Sodom.

In December 2009, Creep announced that he was wrapping up post on another collection of shorts called Creepshows Revenge: Creep Creepersin's Creepshow Part 2 as well as the complete Decomposing Jack series on DVD.

Creep will also be making his Final Girl Trilogy (Final Girl, Red Machete Blue: Final Girl 2, Final Girl: Final!) all at the same time in late spring. His films Erection, He, Peeping Blog, Orgy of Blood, The Corporate Cut Throat Massacre, Ding Dong Dead, The Brothers Cannibal, Vaginal Holocaust and Caged Lesbos A-Go-Go premiered as part of the Featuresin on The PollyGrind Film Festival 2010 in Las Vegas.

=== Books ===
Creep has written three books. The Legend of Cartwayne Twain and other tales and poems is a book that Creep put out on his own Creepsville Press publishing house in 2006. In 2007, Blood Lust Romance was published on Creepsville Press. It had another pressing later that year from Dark Myth Productions. His last book, Blood Lust Revenge, was published in 2008. It is rumored that Creep has written three other books Creepology, Blood Lust Rage, and a novelization of O.C. Babes and the Slasher of Zombietown.

==== Books ====
- The Legend of Cartwayne Twain and Other Tales and Poems
- Blood Lust Romance
- Blood Lust Revenge

== Filmography ==
=== Feature-length films ===
- Creep Creepersin's Frankenstein (2007)
- O.C. Babes and the Slasher of Zombietown (2008)
- Erection (2008)
- He (2008)
- Vaginal Holocaust (2009)
- Peeping Blog (2009)
- Orgy of Blood (2009)
- Caged Lesbos A Go Go (2009)
- Sexual Violence in Cinema (2009)
- Ding Dong Dead (2009)
- The Corporate Cut Throat Massacre (2009)
- The Brothers Cannibal (2010)
- The Brides of Sodom (2010)
- Lake Death (2010)
- Lovesick Captivity (2011)
- Finger Bang! (2011)
- I Was a Teenage Suicide (2012)
- Reanimated Roadkill (2012)
- Saltwater (2012)

=== Short films and videos ===
- Meet Me Out in the Sticks (2005)
- The Room Mate (2006)
- The Bedroom (2006)
- Michelle (2006)
- I Need More Blood (2006)
- A Night with the Outlaw (2006)
- Dead, Dead, Dead, Dead, Dead, Dead, Dead, Dead (2006)
- Baby Dracula (2007)
- Decomposing Jack (2007)
- The Rabbit is Leaking (2008)
- Creepersin's Nightmare (2009)
- Creep Creepersin's Creepshow (2009)
- Creepshows Revenge: Creep Creepersin's Creepshow Part 2 (2010)
- Cannibal Blood Girl (2011)
- MKC: Monster Killers Club (2012)

=== As an actor in other films ===
- Strangers (2008)
- Amateur Porn Star Killer 3D (2009)
- Electrolite (2009)
- The Human Race (2010)
- Vampire Boys (2011)
