= To a Tee =

- Directed by: Matt Riddlehoover
- Written by: Matt Riddlehoover
- Produced by: Matt Riddlehoover; Ed Hager
- Starring: Matt Riddlehoover; Lindsey Hancock; Jonas Brandon
- Cinematography: Chris Lewandowski
- Edited by: Matt Riddlehoover
- Distributed by: TLAgay.com
- Release date: 2006
- Running time: 64 minutes
- Country: United States
- Language: English

To a Tee is a 2006 film written and directed by Matt Riddlehoover and starring Riddlehoover with Lindsey Hancock and Jonas Brandon. It has been described as “Annie Hall meets Will & Grace”. The film's sharply edited theatrical trailer sparked much attention on the Web, specifically on MySpace.

== Plot ==
Matt Riddlehoover wrote, directed, edited and stars in this seriocomic feature about a gay playwright who feeds off his stubborn attraction to the wrong type of guy (played in multiple roles by Jonas Brandon). When he attracts the attention of a newspaper columnist (Lindsey Hancock) who will champion his work, success seems guaranteed until he meets her boyfriend - played by Brandon. The film excels in Riddlehoover's delivery as the self-absorbed, flawed hero.Winner of the MySpace Film User's Choice Award.

== Release ==
The film was released on November 6, 2006 in the United States.
