= Wuyi Mountains =

Mountain range in China

Wuyi Range 武夷山
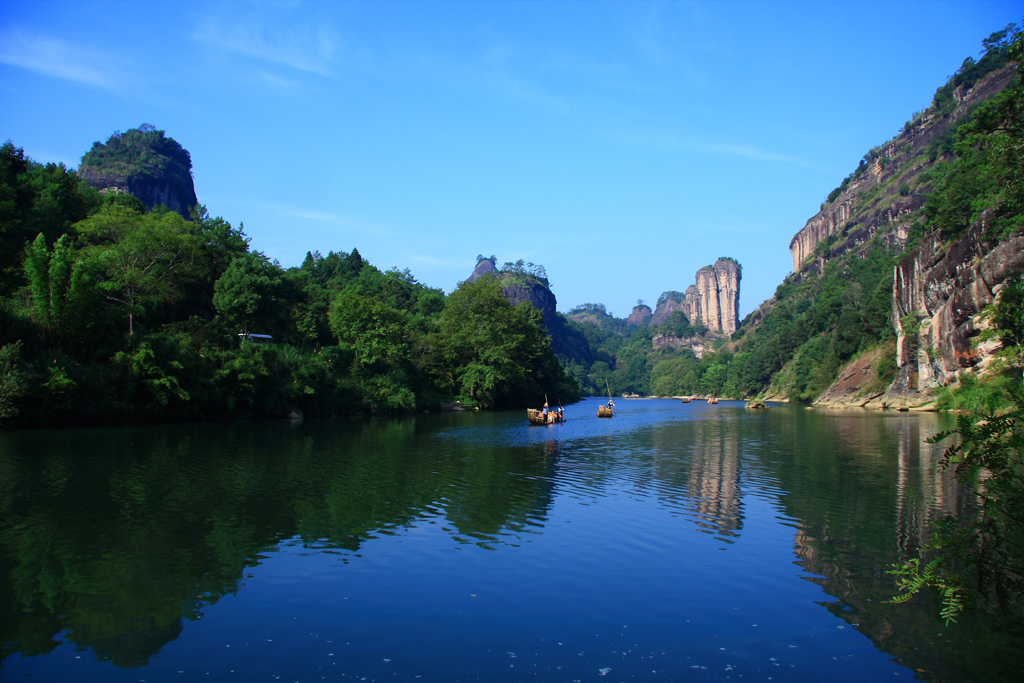
- Panorama of the Wuyi Range

Highest point
- Elevation: 2,158 m (7,080 ft)
- Coordinates: 27°43′N 117°41′E

Geography
- Location within Fujian Location within Eastern China
- Location: Fujian and Jiangxi, China
- Parent range: Zhejiang–Fujian Hills

UNESCO World Heritage Site
- Official name: Mount Wuyi
- Type: Mixed
- Criteria: iii, vi, vii, x
- Designated: 1999 (23rd session), modified 2017
- Reference no.: 911bis
- Region: Asia-Pacific

Wuyi Mountains
- "Wuyi Mountains" in Chinese characters
- Chinese: 武夷山
- Literal meaning: Mountains of Warrior Barbarians
Transcriptions
Standard Mandarin
- Hanyu Pinyin: Wǔyí Shān
- Wade–Giles: Wu^{3}-i^{2} Shan^{1}
- IPA: [ù.ǐ ʂán]
Yue: Cantonese
- Yale Romanization: Móuh-yìh Sāan
- Jyutping: Mou^{5}-ji^{4} Saan^{1}
Northern Min
- Jian'ou Romanized: Ǔ-ǐ Súing

Jade Girl Peak (right) on the Jiuqu Xi (Nine-bend River), Wuyi Mountains, 1871

The Wuyi Mountains or Wuyishan (Chinese: 武夷山; pinyin: Wǔyí Shān; formerly known as Bohea Hills in early Western documents, derived from Hokkien Bú-î-soaⁿ) are a mountain range located in the prefecture of Nanping, in northern Fujian province near the border with Jiangxi province, China. The highest peak in the area is Mount Huanggang at 2,158 metres (7,080 ft) on the border of Fujian and Jiangxi, making it the highest point of both provinces; the lowest altitudes are around 200 metres (660 ft). Many oolong and black teas are produced in the Wuyi Mountains, including Da Hong Pao ('big red robe') and lapsang souchong, and are sold as Wuyi tea. The mountain range is known worldwide for its status as a refugium for several rare and endemic plant species, its dramatic river valleys, and the abundance of important temples and archeological sites in the region, and is a UNESCO World Heritage Site.

The Wuyi Mountains are located between Wuyishan City of the Nanping prefecture in northwest Fujian province, and the city of Wuyishan within Shangrao city in northeast Jiangxi province.

== Description ==
=== World Heritage Site ===
The mountains have been listed since 1999 as a UNESCO World Heritage Site, for cultural, scenic, and biodiversity values.

The site has a total area of 99,975 hectares that is divided into four core parts. Three are ecological: the Nine-bend Stream Ecological Protection Area (36,400 ha) in the centre, flanked by the Wuyishan National Nature Reserve (56,527 ha) to the west and the Wuyishan National Scenic Area (7,000 ha) to the east. The fourth, a cultural preservation area, is the Protection Area for the Remains of the Ancient Han Dynasty (48 ha), about 15 km to the southeast of the others. These core parts are surrounded by an additional buffer zone of 27,888 ha. Portions of the Wuyishan National Nature Reserve are more stringently protected, as the Fujian and Jiangxi Wuyishan Biosphere Reserves on the respective sides of the provincial border, under the UNESCO World Network of Biosphere Reserves.

=== Geology ===
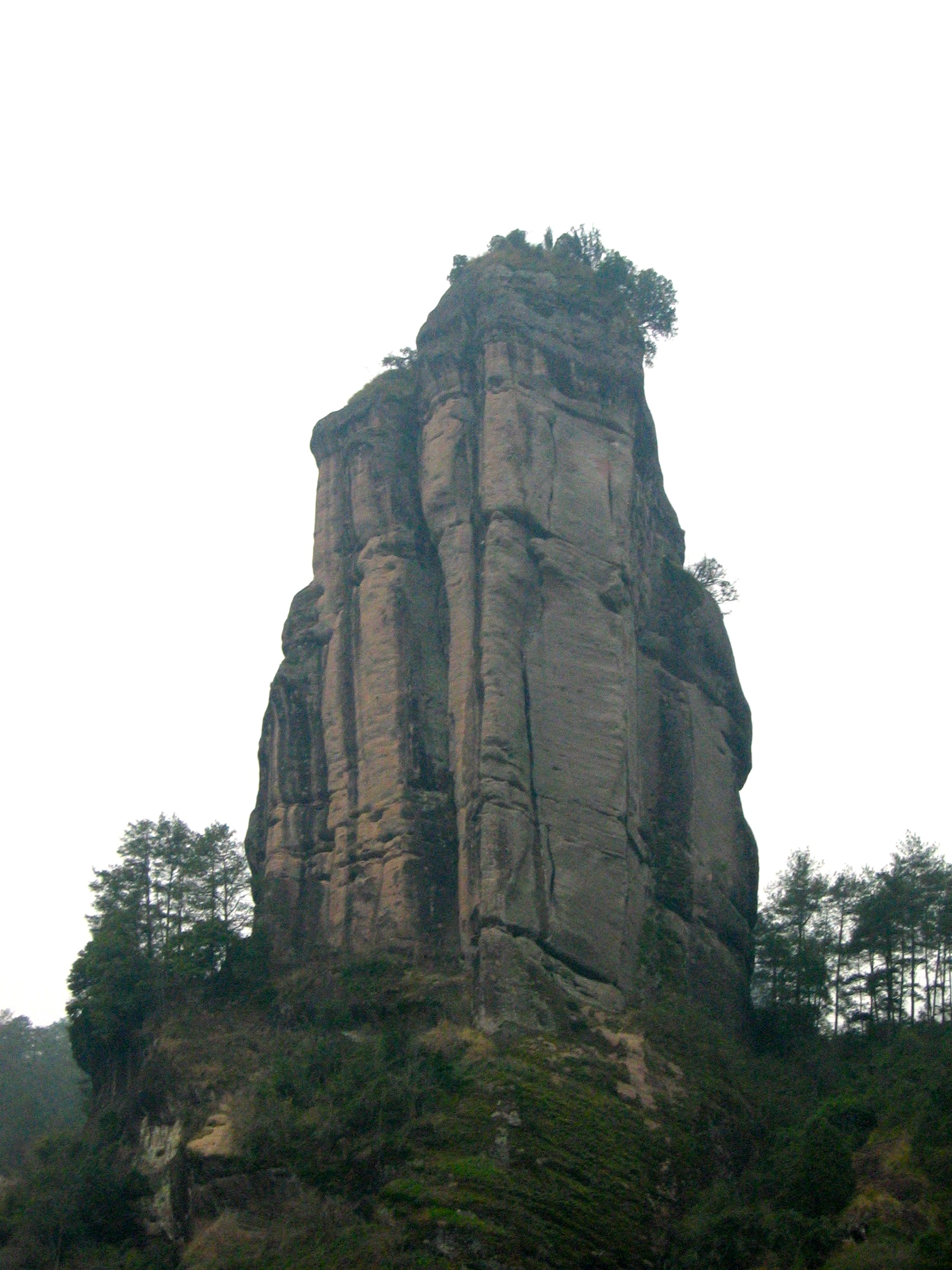
The Yunnu hill, iconic among the Wuyi Mountains.

The region is part of the Cathaysian fold system and has experienced high volcanic activity and the formation of large fault structures, which were subsequently subject to erosion by water and weathering. The landscape is characterized by beautiful winding river valleys flanked by columnar or dome-shaped cliffs as well as cave systems. Peaks in the western portion of the Wuyi Mountains typically consist of volcanic or plutonic rocks, whereas peaks and hills in the eastern area are made up of red sandstone (particularly in the east) with very steep slopes but flat tops (Danxia landform). Bedrock lithology at Wuyi Shan is dominated by tuff, rhyolite, and granite in the western part. Red sandstone is common farther east. The elevation ranges from 200 m (656 ft) to 2,158 m (7,080 ft). The terrain is rugged with cliffs and high peaks. There are numerous caverns in the mountains, some of which have been explored and opened to the public.

The Jiuqu Xi river (transl. Nine-bend River; also Jiuqu River), about 60 kilometers in length, meanders in a deep gorge among these hills. In most places, it is a slow, shallow stream navigable only by small craft like rowboats and canoes. However, the river narrows at one point to just a few metres but a depth of 80 metres (260 ft).

=== Climate ===
The Wuyi Mountains act as a protective barrier against the inflow of cold air from the northwest and retain warm moist air originating from the sea. As a result, the area has a humid climate (humidity 80 to 85%) with high rainfall (annual average 2,200 millimeters in the south-west and 3,200 millimeters in the north) and common fogs. Lower altitudes experience annual temperatures in the range from 12 °C to 18 °C.

The area is relatively pollution-free. The Chinese government set up its first air-quality monitoring station in the area on January 31, 2005.

Lower elevations have a humid subtropical climate with mean annual temperature around 18 °C (64 °F) and mean annual precipitation of at least 220 cm (86.6 in). Cooler, wetter conditions prevail at higher altitudes and winters can be snowy on the highest peaks.

== Biodiversity ==
=== Flora ===
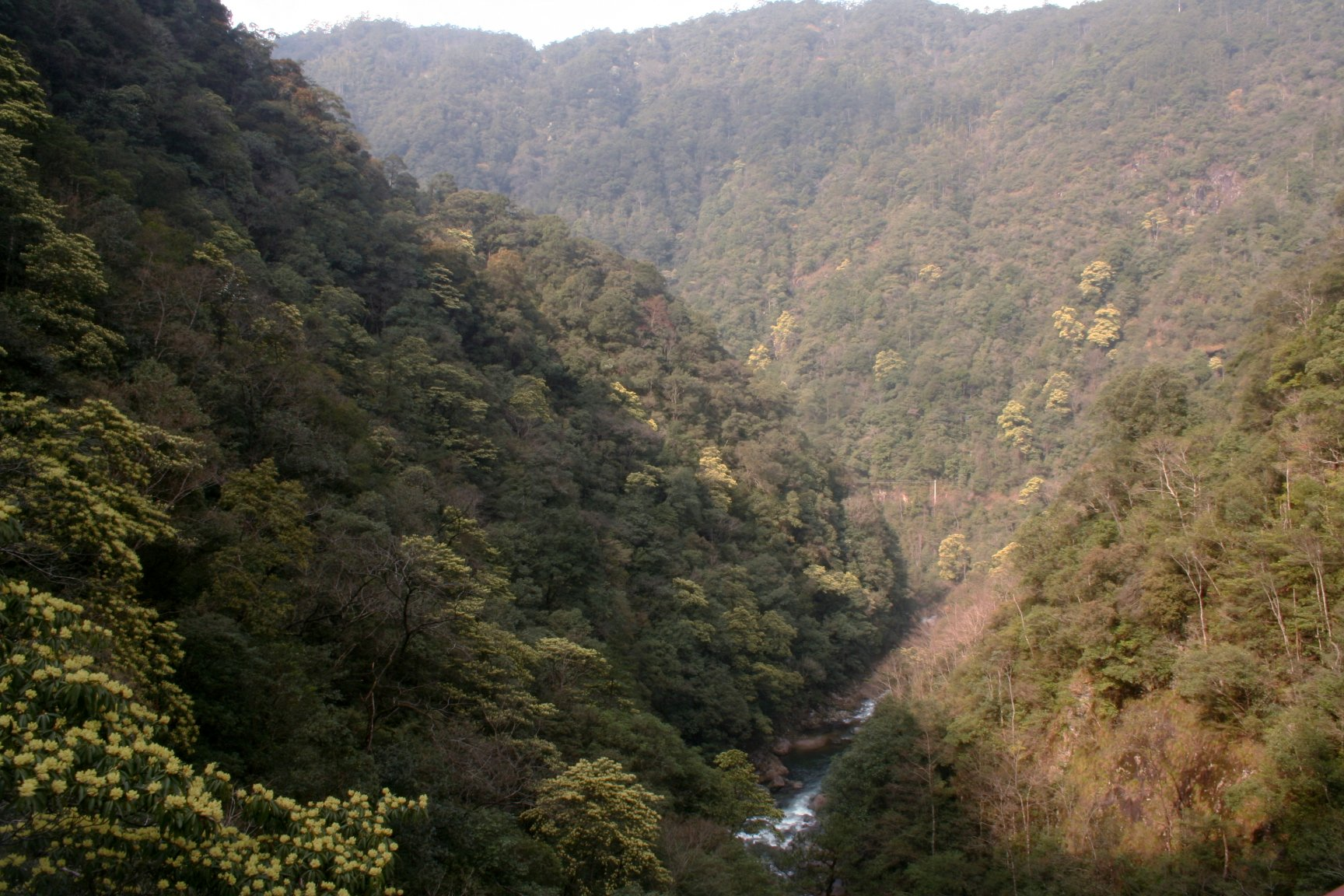
Forest in the nature reserve portion of the Wuyi Mountains.

The Wuyi Mountains are the largest and most representative example of Chinese subtropical forests, and of the biodiversity of south Chinese rainforest. The region's ecology has survived from before the Ice Age around 3 million years ago. Biologists have been conducting field research in the area since 1873.

The vegetation of the area depends strongly on altitude. Broadleaf evergreen forests dominate the lower elevations; their tree species yield to deciduous and needleleaf evergreen trees at higher elevations. It is divided into 11 broad categories:

- Temperate coniferous forest
- Warm coniferous forest
- Temperate broad-leaved and coniferous mixed forest
- Deciduous and broad-leaved forest
- Evergreen broad-leaved and deciduous mixed forest
- Evergreen broad-leaved forest
- Bamboo forest
- Deciduous broad-leaved shrub forest
- Evergreen broad-leaved shrub forest
- Brush-wood
- Meadow steppe

Most common are evergreen broad-leaved forests, some of which make up the largest remaining tracts of humid sub-tropical forests in the world. Higher plants from 284 families, 1,107 genera, and 2,888 species, as well as 840 species of lower plant and fungus, have been reported for the region. The most common tree families are beech (Fagaceae), laurel (Lauraceae), camellia (Theaceae), magnolia (Magnoliaceae), Elaeocarpaceae, and witch-hazel (Hamamelidaceae).

=== Fauna ===
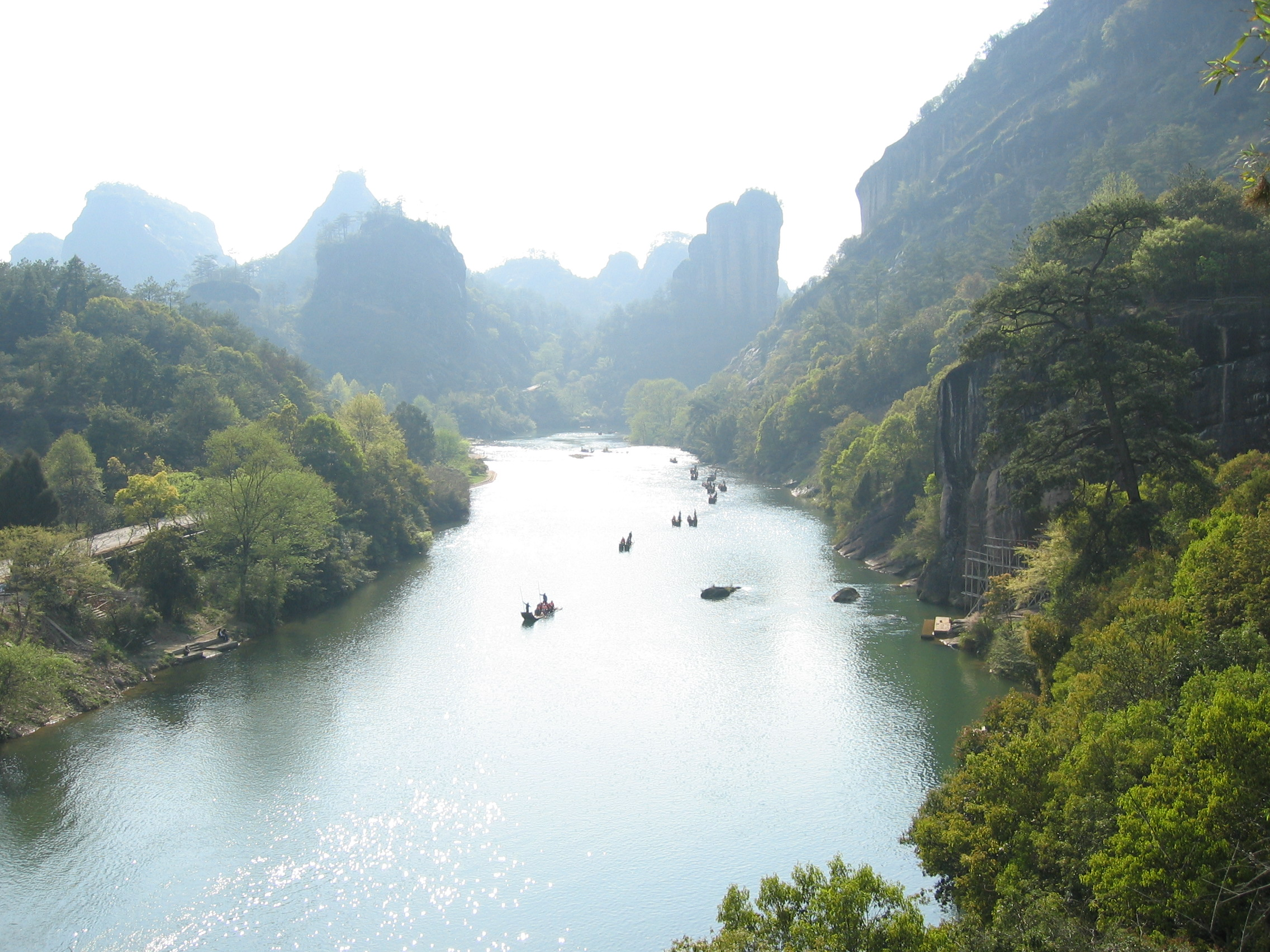
Punting on the River of Nine Bends, Wuyishan, China.

The fauna of the Wuyi Mountains is renowned for its high diversity, which includes many rare and unusual species. In total, approximately 5,000 animal species have been reported for the area. Of these species, 475 are vertebrates and 4,635 are insects. The number of vertebrate species is divided as follows:

	families	species
mammals	23	71
birds	47	256
reptiles	13	73
amphibians	10	35
fish	12	40

Forty-nine vertebrate species are endemic to China and three are endemic to the Wuyi Mountains. The latter are the bird David's parrotbill (Neosuthora davidiana), Pope's spiny toad (Vibrissaphora liui), and the bamboo snake Pseudoxenodon karlschmidti (family Colubridae). Other known endangered species in the area include South China tiger (Panthera tigris amoyensis), clouded leopard (Neofelis nebulosa), hairy-fronted muntjac (Muntiacus crinifrons), Mainland serow (Capricornis milneedwardsii– a goat antelope), Cabot's tragopan (Tragopan caboti), Chinese black-backed pheasant (Syrmaticus ellioti), Chinese giant salamander (Andrias davidianus), and the golden Kaiser-i-Hind (Teinopalpus aureus – a swallowtail butterfly).

== Human history and culture ==
Human settlement on the slopes of Mount Wuyi can be traced back 4,000 years by archeological remains. During the Western Han dynasty, the ancient city of Chengcun was the capital of the Minyue kingdom. In the 7th century, the Wuyi Palace was built for emperors to conduct sacrificial activities, a site that tourists can still visit today. The mountains were an important center of Taoism and later Buddhism. Remains of 35 academies erected from the era of the Northern Song to the Qing dynasty and more than 60 Taoist temples and monasteries have been located. However, most of these remains are very incomplete. Some of the exceptions for which authentic remains are preserved are the Taoyuan Temple, the Wannian Palace, the Sanqing Hall, the Tiancheng Temple, the Baiyun temple, and the Tianxin temple. The area is the cradle of Neo-Confucianism, a current that became very influential since the 11th century.

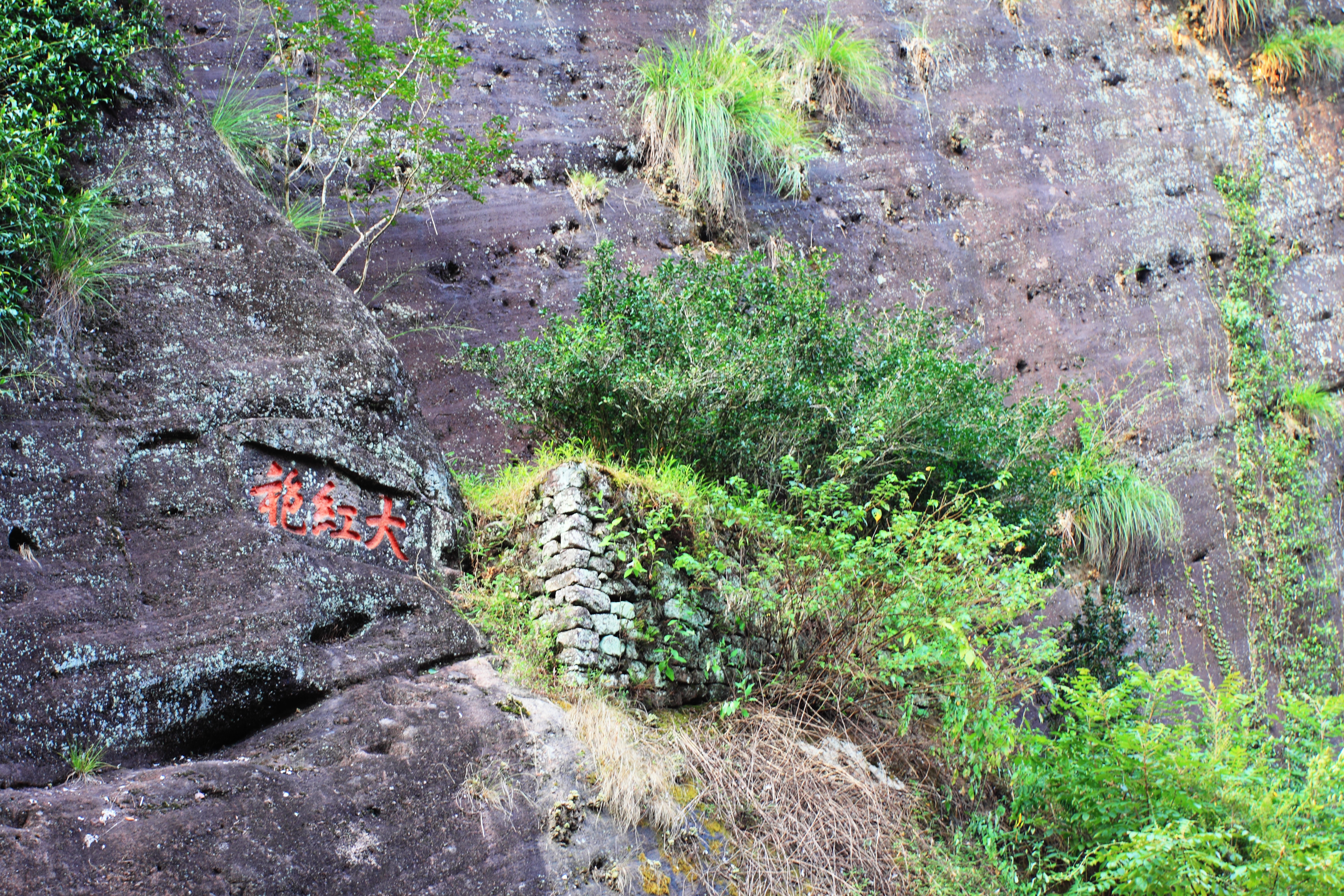
Rare Da Hong Pao ('Big Red Robe') tea growing on a Wuyi Mountain cliff

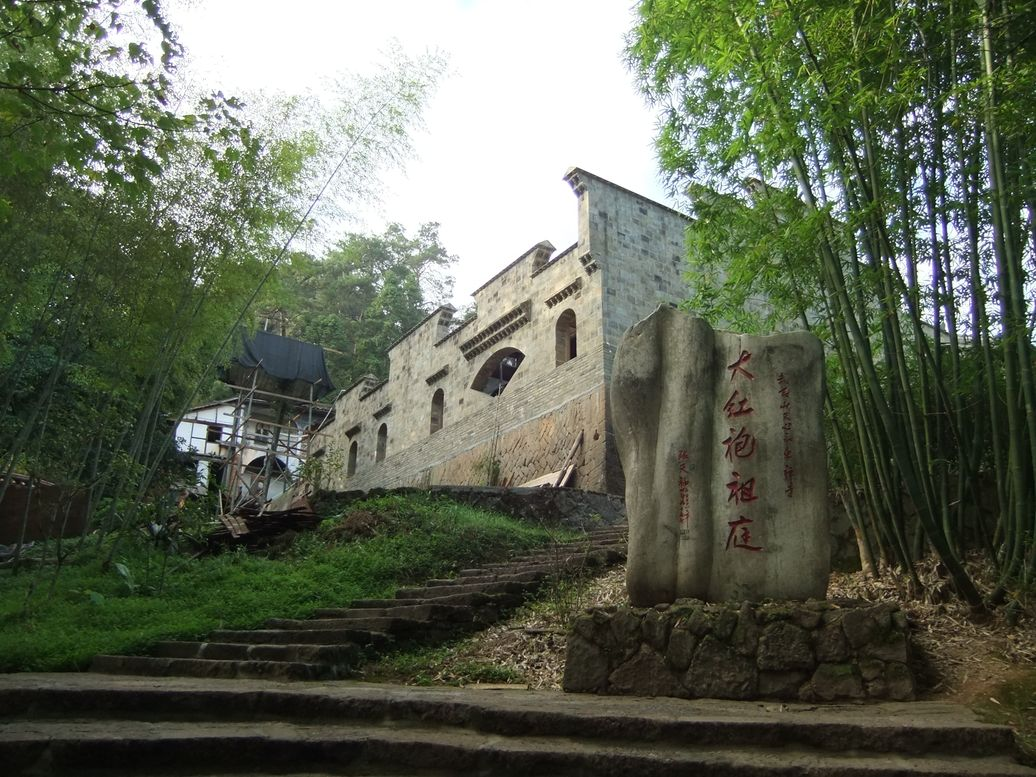
Da Hong Pao tea shrine

=== Ceremonies ===
Mountain Call and Mountain Open are ceremonies held in the Wuyi imperial tea garden. The county magistrate used to take the chair of the Mountain Call ceremony on Jingzhe Day (惊蛰). In the formal ceremony, tea planters call out together "tea, tea, sprout". By doing this, they pray for blessings in the tea harvest.

=== Leap-year meals ===
Special leap-year meals are called Liu Qin (六亲) meals. Every leap year and leap month, parents and brothers must invite their married daughters and sisters to return and have meals with their original family. When parents are living, they make the invitation; otherwise brothers do it.

=== Tourism ===
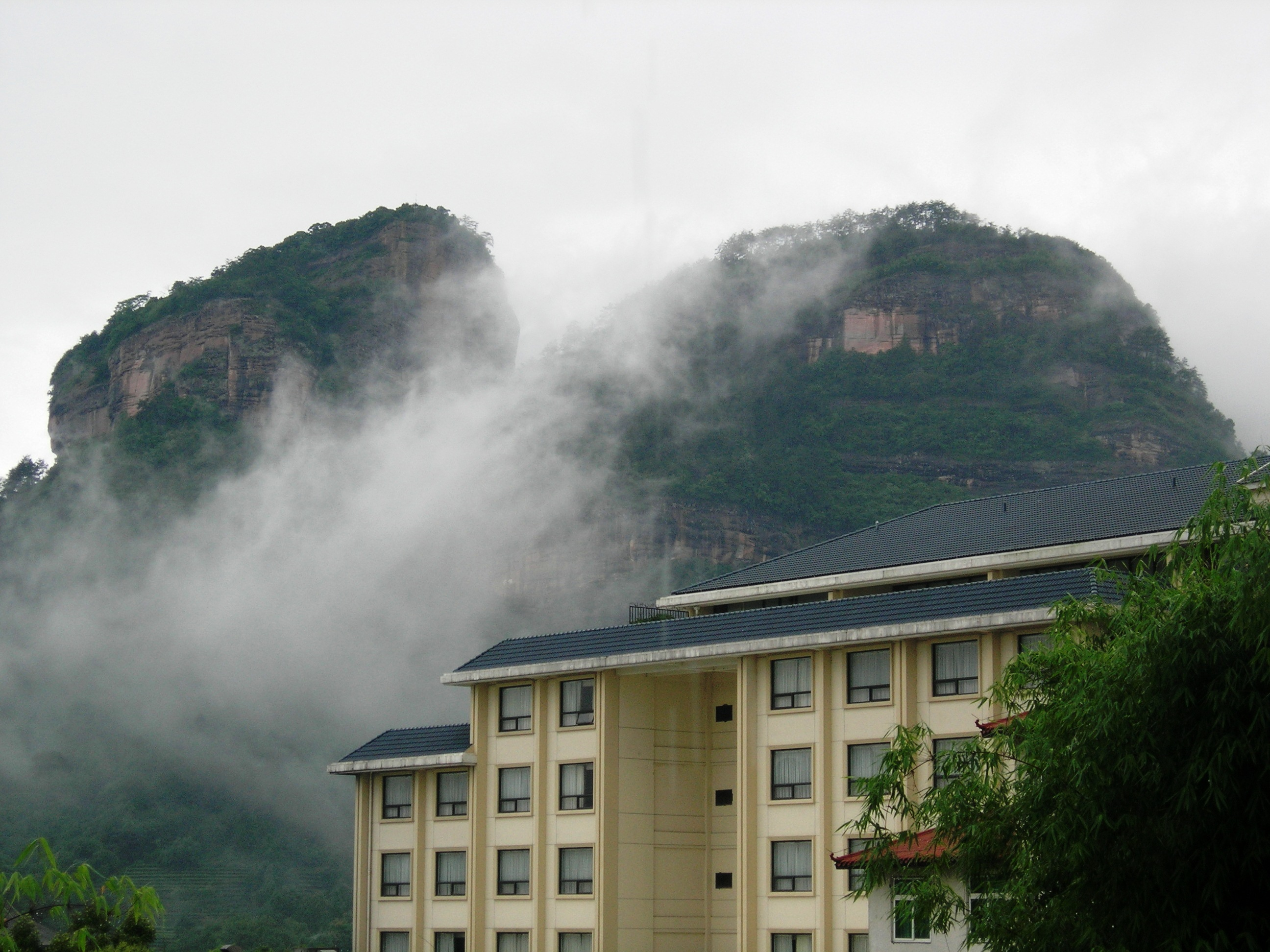
Mountain peak seen from a hotel in Wuyishan Scenic Area

The number of visitors to the area increased from approximately 424,000 in 1993 to 700,000 in 1998. A raft trip down the Nine-bend River is the most popular activity. Another major attraction is Fuxi Cave, where the narrowest passage – the Thread of Sky – is less than 40 centimetres (16 in), a fissure open to the surface above. A few hours away is Roaring Tiger Rock, where wind blowing into a cave makes a roaring sound. The nearby Tian Cheng Temple, built in 1707, features a large rock-relief statue of the Chinese goddess of mercy, carved directly into the mountainside. Two more explorable caverns in the area are Ling Cave and Feng Cave. At least one guided-tour company operates combined tours to several of these mountain features. Visitor access to the biodiversity-protection areas in the mountains is controlled.

== Tea ==
The Wuyi Mountains have a long history of tea cultivation. The four most widely known varieties of Wuyi rock-essence tea are referred to as the Si Da Ming Cong ('Four Great Cultivars') teas: Da Hong Pao ('Big Red Robe'), Tie Luo Han ('Iron Arhat'), Bai Jiguan ('White Cockscomb'), and Shui Jin Gui ('Golden Water Turtle'). The Lapsang souchong also originates from the area.

=== Tea-picking opera ===
The Wuyi Mountains area is the birthplace of tea-picking opera. Developed from local folk dances and songs, the performances are comedic and focused on daily life in the tea-growing region. Tea-picking opera reflects the strongly rural nature and basics of Hakka culture. This has made it popular in the local area.

=== Impression Da Hong Pao Show ===
As the world's only large-scale landscape live-action show showcasing Chinese tea culture, Impression Da Hong Pao showcases the history of tea and the various tea-making processes around the tea culture of Wuyi Mountain. Impression Da Hong Pao is 70 minutes long and takes place in a completely open landscape, making it the world's first "landscape surroundings theater".

== See also ==
- Wuyi New Area
