= List of Chinese teas =

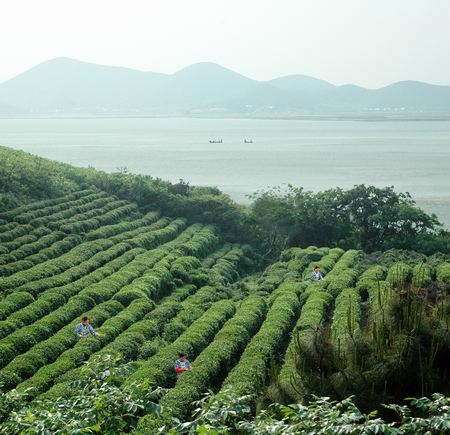
Green tea cultivation in China

This is a list of Chinese teas. Chinese tea is a beverage made from the leaves of tea plants (Camellia sinensis) and – depending on the type of tea – typically 60–100 °C hot water. Tea leaves are processed using traditional Chinese methods. Chinese tea is drunk throughout the day, including during meals, as a substitute for plain water, for health, or for simple pleasure.

== Chinese teas ==
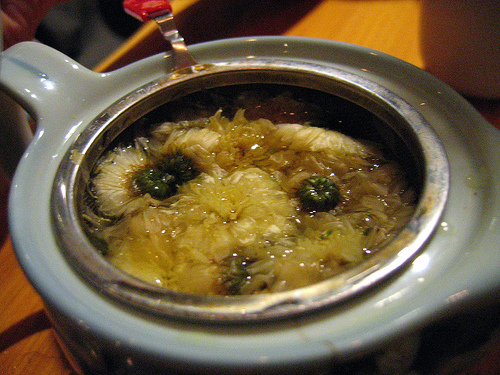
Chrysanthemum tea

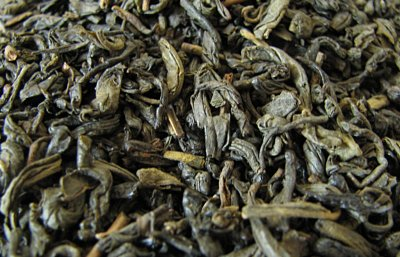
Chun Mee is a popular green tea.

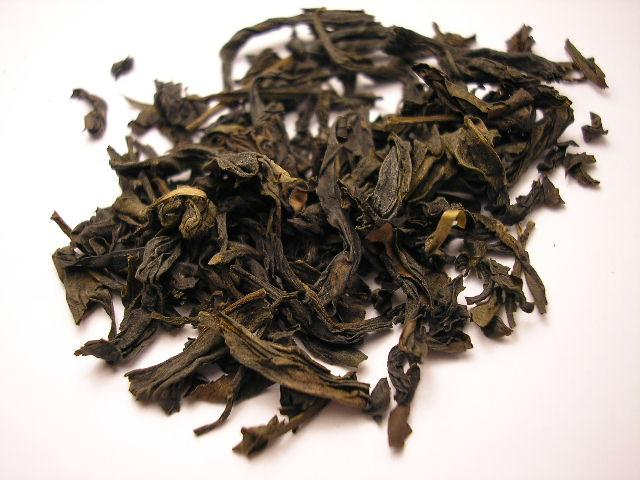
Jin Fo tea is a relatively new Wuyi oolong tea.

=== Types ===
Name	Image
Black tea (紅茶)	
Green tea (綠茶)	
Oolong (烏龍, also known as Wulong)	
White tea (白茶)	
Yellow tea (黃茶)	
Fermented / Dark tea (黑茶)	
Scented tea	
Herbal / Medicinal tea (tisane)	

=== Growing areas ===
- Cloud tea
- Wuyi tea ("Bohea")

=== Styles ===
Name	Image
Flowering tea (香片, 工艺茶, or 开花茶)	
Ground tea (Lei cha) (擂茶)	
Gunpowder tea (珠茶)	
Jasmine tea (茉莉花茶 or 香片)	
Kombucha (昆布茶)	

=== Infusions ===
- Chrysanthemum tea
- Gynostemma pentaphyllum
- Kuding

=== Tea varieties ===
- 24 flavors — herbal
- Anji bai cha — green
- Baihao Yinzhen — white
- Bai Jiguan — oolong
- Bai Mudan — white
- Baimao Hou — green
- Ban Tian Yao — oolong
- Biluochun — green
- Bu Zhi Chun — oolong
- Chun Mee — green
- "Congou" — black
- Da Fang — green
- Da Hong Pao — oolong
- Dianhong — black
- Fo Shou — oolong
- Fu Cha — fermented
- Golden Monkey tea — black
- Huang Guanyin — oolong
- Huang Meigui — oolong
- Huangshan Maofeng — green
- Huoshan Huangya — yellow
- Jin Fo — oolong
- Jin Jun Mei — black
- Jin Suo Chi — oolong
- Junshan Yinzhen — yellow
- Keemun — black
- Lapsang souchong — black
- Longjing tea — green
- Lu'an Melon Seed tea — green
- Mengding Ganlu — green
- Panda dung tea
- Pouchong — green/oolong
- Pu'er — fermented
- Qilan — oolong
- Rougui — oolong
- Ruan Zhi — oolong
- Shou Mei — white
- Shui Hsien — oolong
- Shui Jin Gui — oolong
- Taiping houkui — green
- Tieluohan — oolong
- Tieguanyin — oolong
- Wong Lo Kat — herbal
- Yingdehong — black
- Zhuyeqing — green
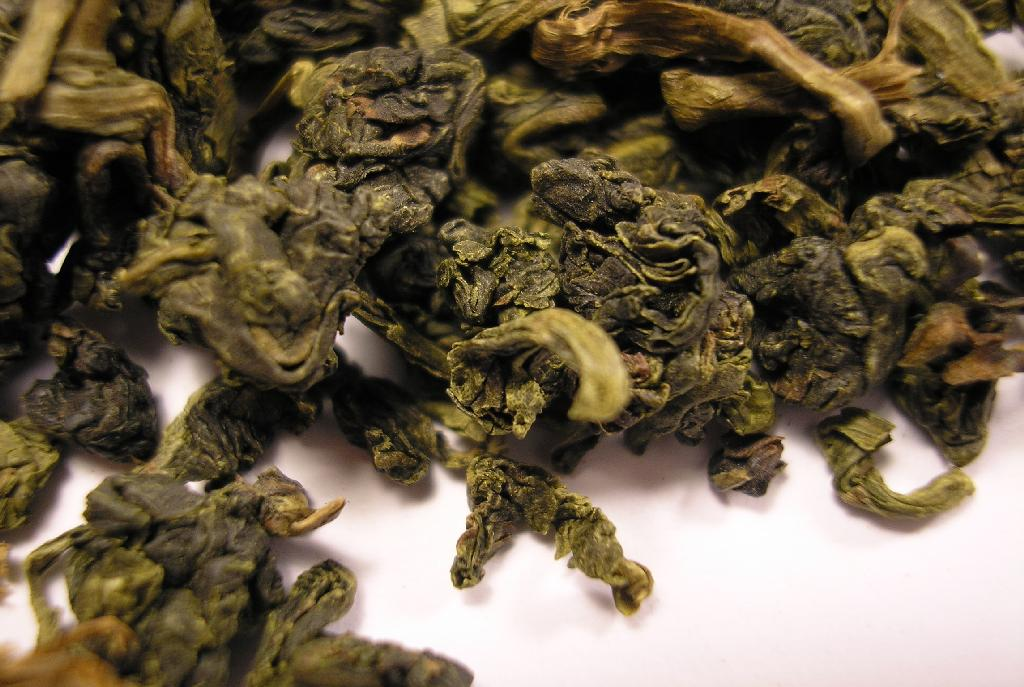
A close-up of Huang Guanyin tea

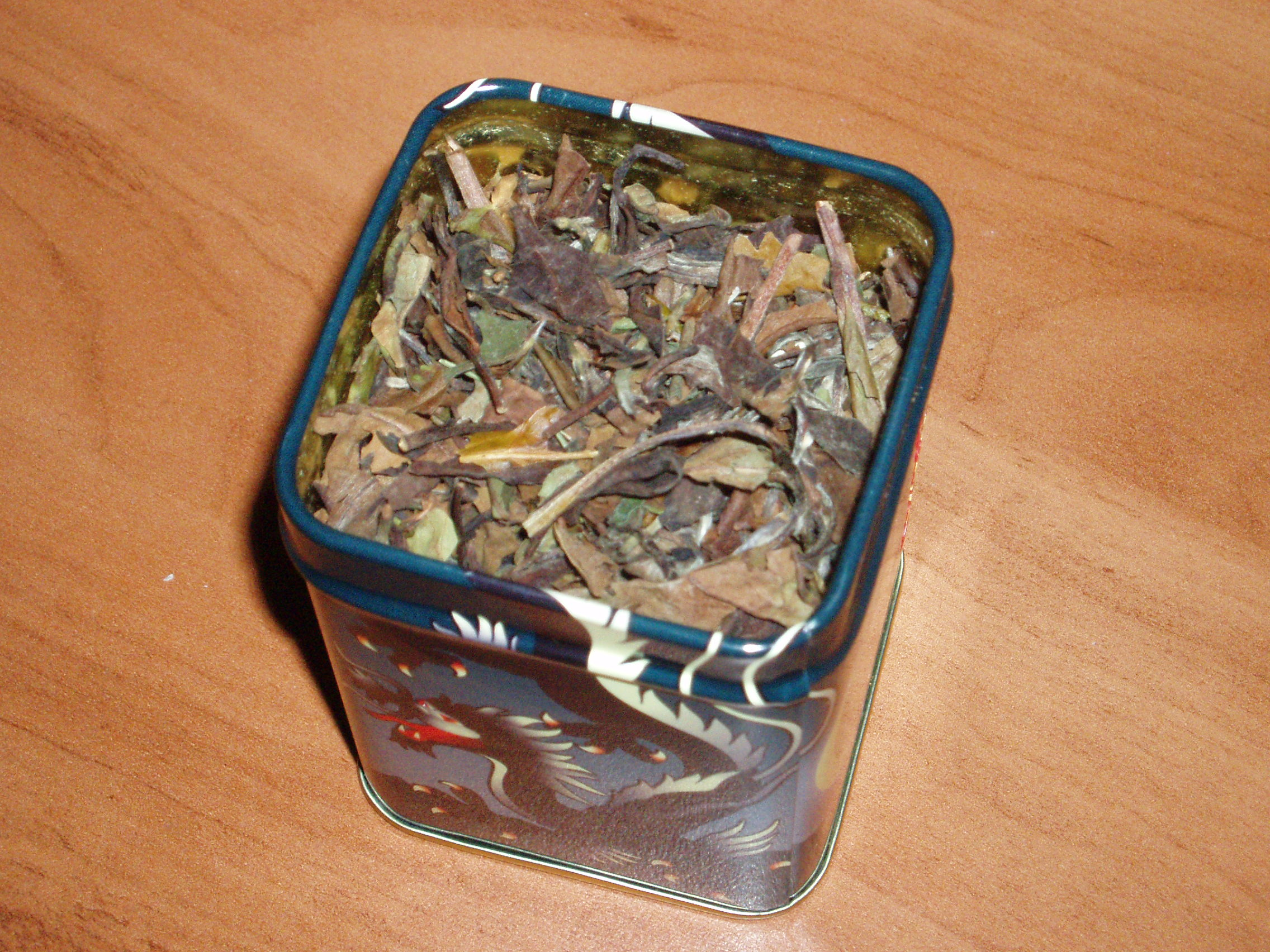
Shoumei tea is a white tea that is produced from naturally withered upper leaf and tips, with a stronger flavor reminiscent of lighter Oolong teas. It is mostly grown in the Fujian province or Guangxi province in China.

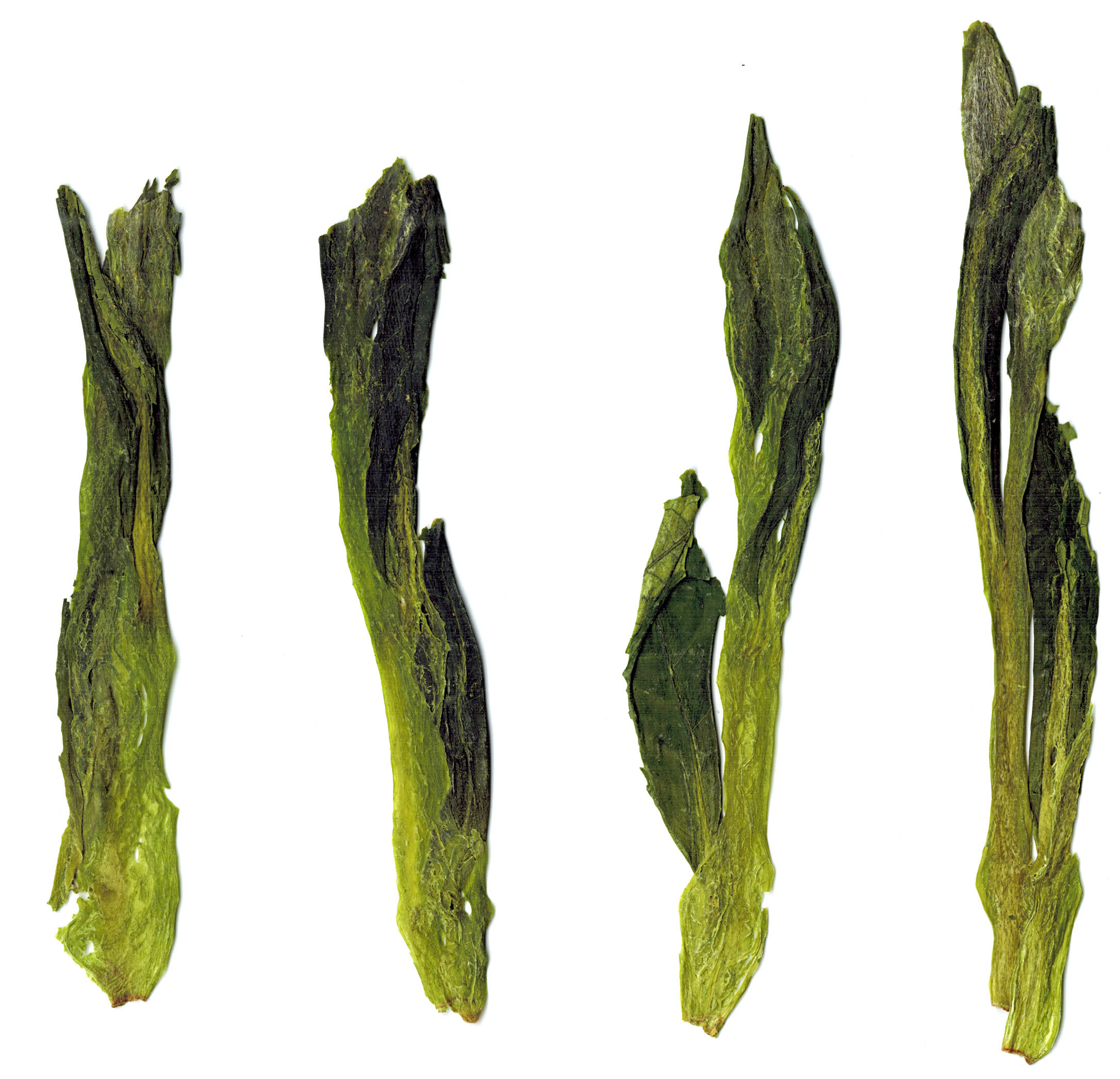
Fresh taiping houkui green tea leaves

==== Types of Pu'er ====
- Sticky rice pu'er, infused with leaves of Semnostachya menglaensis native to Mengla.
- Banzhang
- Jingmai
- Bamboo roasted pu'er
- Bulang

== Ten Famous Teas ==
Several types of tea have been listed as one of the "Ten Famous Chinese Teas" or "China Famous Teas" (simplified Chinese: 中国十大名茶; traditional Chinese: 中國十大名茶; pinyin: Zhōngguó shí dàmíng chá).

While no authoritative lists exists per se, teas commonly considered one of the ten include:

Name	Image
West Lake Longjing tea (Dragon Well Tea) (西湖龍井茶)	
Dongting Biluochun (Snail Spring Tea) (洞庭碧螺春)	
Huangshan Maofeng (Yellow Mountain Fur Peak) (黄山毛峰)	
Junshan Yinzhen (Silver Needle Tea) (君山銀針)	
Qimen Red Tea (祁門紅茶)	
Lu'an Melon Seed Tea or Luan Leaf (六安瓜片)	
Xinyang Maojian tea (信阳毛尖)	
Duyun Maojian (都匀毛尖)	
Wuyi Tea, also known as Bohea (武夷岩茶), including Da Hong Pao	
Anxi County Iron Goddess of Mercy (安溪鐵觀音)	
Peaceful Monkey Leader (太平猴魁)	
Lushan Cloud tea (庐山雲雾)	

== See also ==
- Chinese tea by province (category)
- Chinese tea culture
- Chinese tea classic texts (category)
- History of tea in China
- Lists of beverages
