= Lu'an Melon Seed tea =

Chinese green tea

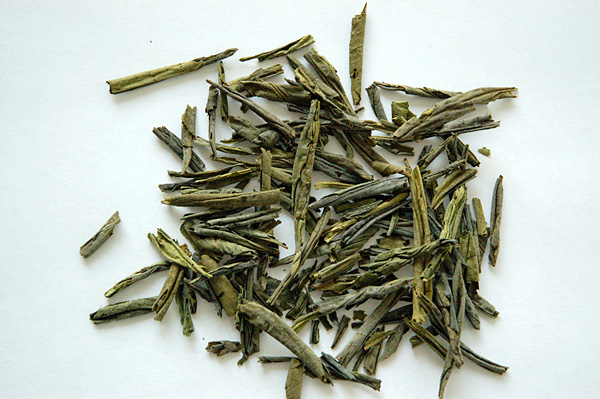
Examples of Lu'an Melon Seed Tea

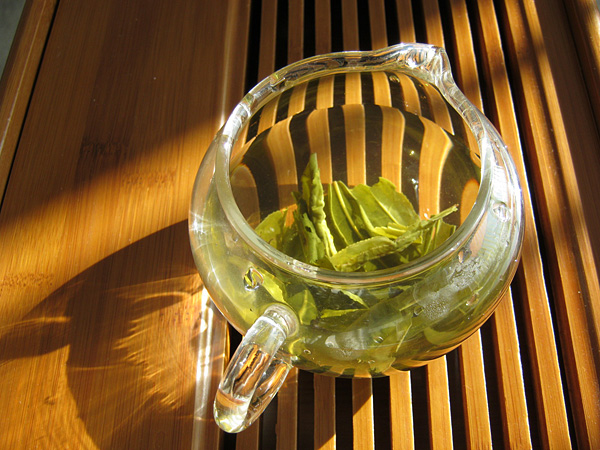
Lu'an Melon Seed Tea

Lu'an Melon Seed tea is grown in Anhui province, China.

Lu'an Melon Seed (Chinese: 六安瓜片; pinyin: Lù'ān guāpiàn; pronounced [lûán kwápʰjɛ̂n]), also known as Lu'an Leaf, is a green tea from Lu'an City, Anhui Province, China. This is a famous green tea and is listed on virtually all lists of famous Chinese teas. The literal translation for Lu'an Guapian Tea is Lu'an Melon Seed Tea.

Lu'an Melon Seed Tea's name is derived from the shape of the processed tea leaves, which are flat and oval and resemble a melon seed. Unlike most green teas which use the new buds in making tea, Lu'an Melon Seed Tea uses the second leaf on the branch. Each leaf's central vein is removed and the leaves are pan fried and shaped to stop oxidizing enzymes and dry the tea.

== History ==
Lu'an Melon Seed Tea was first recorded in The Classic of Tea.

The Classic of Tea was the first book about general tea knowledge, and contained a brief introduction about tea categories and how to prepare tea. It was written by Lu Yu (733–804 CE) during the Tang dynasty (618–907 CE). In contrast to the processing methods for other kinds of green tea such as Longjing, Lu'an Melon Seed Tea is a baked green tea which causes the taste of the tea to be different from other types of green tea in China.

During the Ming dynasty (1368–1644), Lu'an Melon Seed Tea was widely used to prevent sunstroke by the Chinese. The Chinese Christian Xu Guangqi (1562–1633), who was also a well-known scientist writing in his Agricultural Encyclopedia that "laminar tea from Lu'an Prefecture is a top-grade tea".

Lu'an Melon Seed Tea was a type of gong cha ("tribute tea") to the imperial family during the Qing dynasty (1644–1911). It was enjoyed by the Guangxu Emperor (r. 1878–1908) and Empress Dowager Cixi (r. 1861–1908). Lu'an Melon Seed Tea was also mentioned about 80 times by the writer Cao Xueqin (1715–1763) in his novel Dream of the Red Chamber.

== See also ==
- Chinese tea
- Tea processing
- China Famous Tea
