= Golden key =

Golden key may refer to:

- Golden Key International Honour Society
- The English translation of the Latin phrase clavis aurea, used metaphorically in literature
- Les Clefs d'Or ("The Golden Keys"), a professional association of hotel concierges
- A song on the album Azure d'Or by Renaissance
- A 2003 single and album by Isgaard
- An encryption backdoor; see Clipper chip § Later debates
- Jin Suo Chi tea (lit. Golden Key)

== See also ==
- The Golden Key (disambiguation)
