= Dafang tea =

Chinese green tea

Da Fang
- Type: Green
- Other names: Ding Gu Da Fang, Zhupu Da Fang
- Origin: Anhui Province, China
- Quick description: Flat green tea, similar to Longjing with a nutty aroma.

Dafang tea is grown in Anhui province, China.

Da Fang (simplified Chinese: 顶谷大方; traditional Chinese: 頂谷大方; pinyin: dǐng gǔ dà fāng; pronounced [tìŋ kù tâ fáŋ]), also named Zhupu Da Fang or Zhuye Da Fang, is a Chinese green tea. It is considered one of China's top ten teas by some Chinese tea experts. Like Longjing tea, it has sharp flat shapes and a similar production process. Some Chinese tea experts believe Da Fang tea is an ancestor of Longjing tea. It is more accepted that Da Fang tea is the earliest tea with flat leaves.

Da Fang tea is produced near Lao Zhuling (老竹岭; Lǎo Zhúlǐng) mountain and Fu Guanshan (福全山; Fú Quánshān) mountain of She County (歙县; Shè Xiàn), Anhui Province. Its dried leaves take on a yellowish green colour with sleek and flat shapes. Its buds are usually hidden and covered with golden down. When brewed, the liquor gives a durable fragrance with a sweet aftertaste. Different drying processes separate Da Fang tea into two types. Zhong Huo (重火; zhòng huǒ) features a chestnut-like aroma, while Qing Huo (轻火; qīng huǒ) features a brisk and delicate taste.

== See also ==
- China Famous Tea
