= Pearl tea =

Pearl tea may refer to:

- Bubble tea, tea, milk, and chewy tapioca balls
- Gunpowder tea (zhū chá 'pearl tea'), a form of green Chinese tea
