= Huangshan Maofeng =

Chinese green tea

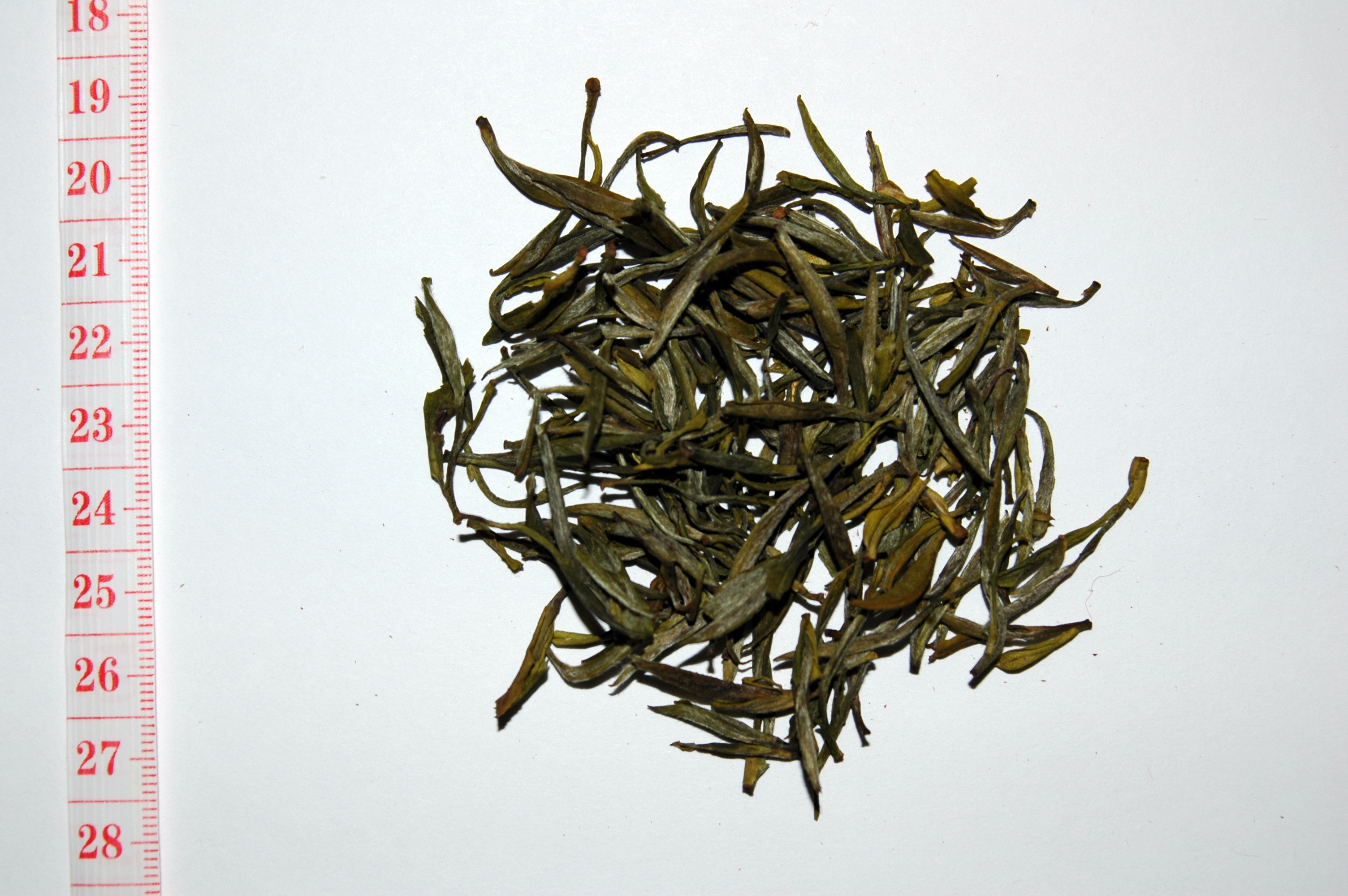
- Type: Green
- Origin: Anhui province, China
- Quick description: Clean needle-like tea with a slight floral overtone

Huangshan Maofeng is grown in Anhui province, China.

Huangshan Maofeng tea (simplified Chinese: 黄山毛峰; traditional Chinese: 黃山毛峯/黄山毛峰; pinyin: huángshān máofēng; pronounced [xwǎŋ.ʂán mǎʊ.fə́ŋ]) is a green tea produced in southeastern interior Anhui province of China. The tea is one of the most famous teas in China and can almost always be found on the China Famous Tea list.

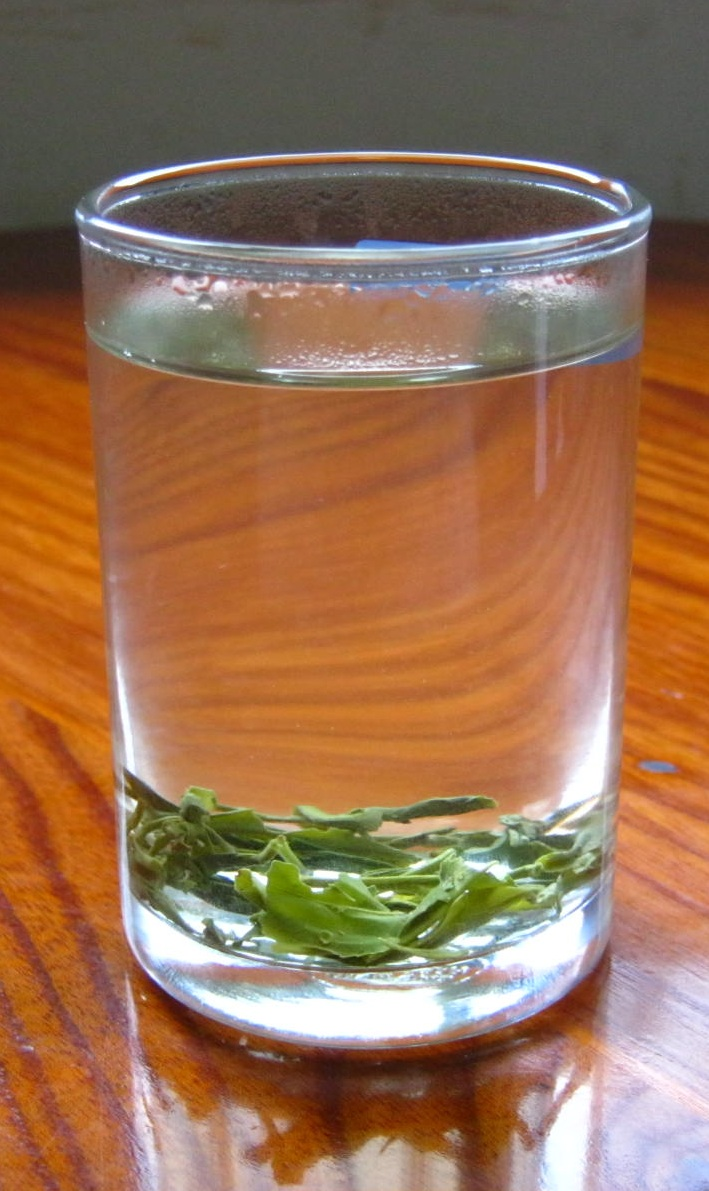

The tea is grown near Huangshan (Yellow Mountain), which is home to many famous varieties of green tea. Huangshan Mao Feng tea's English translation is "Yellow Mountain Fur Peak" due to the small white hairs which cover the leaves and the shape of the processed leaves which resemble the peak of a mountain. The best teas are picked in the early Spring before China's Qingming Festival. When picking the tea, only the new tea buds and the leaf next to the bud are picked. It is said by local tea farmers that the leaves resemble orchid buds.
