= Duyun Maojian =

Chinese Green Tea Type

- Type: Green
- Other names: Chinese: 都匀毛尖, White Tippy, Fine Tippy, Fishhook Tea, or Buxus Tea
- Origin: Guizhou Province, China
- Quick description: A green tea with a fruity and vegetal taste.

Duyun Maojian tea (Simplified Chinese 都匀毛尖) is a green tea produced in Guizhou Province China. A favourite of Mao Zedong, the tea is often listed as one of the famous Chinese teas.

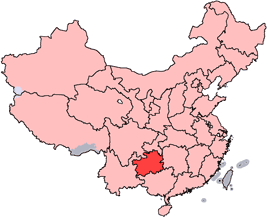
Duyun Maojian is grown in Guizhou province, China.

The best known of the three Guizhou teas Duyun Maojian was originally known as fishhook tea. It was one of the Ming Dynasty and Qing Dynasty tribute teas.

Maojian from Duyun is differentiated from other Maojian type teas by the "three yellows" namely the yellow tint of the dry leaf, the bright yellow of the leaves after brewing, and the yellow color of the tea. In 2022 Duyun Moajian tea processing was added to the UNESCO intangible cultural heritage list.

According to a common but potentially apocryphal tale the tea was given its current name by Mao Zedong in 1956
