= Gunpowder tea =

Variety of green tea

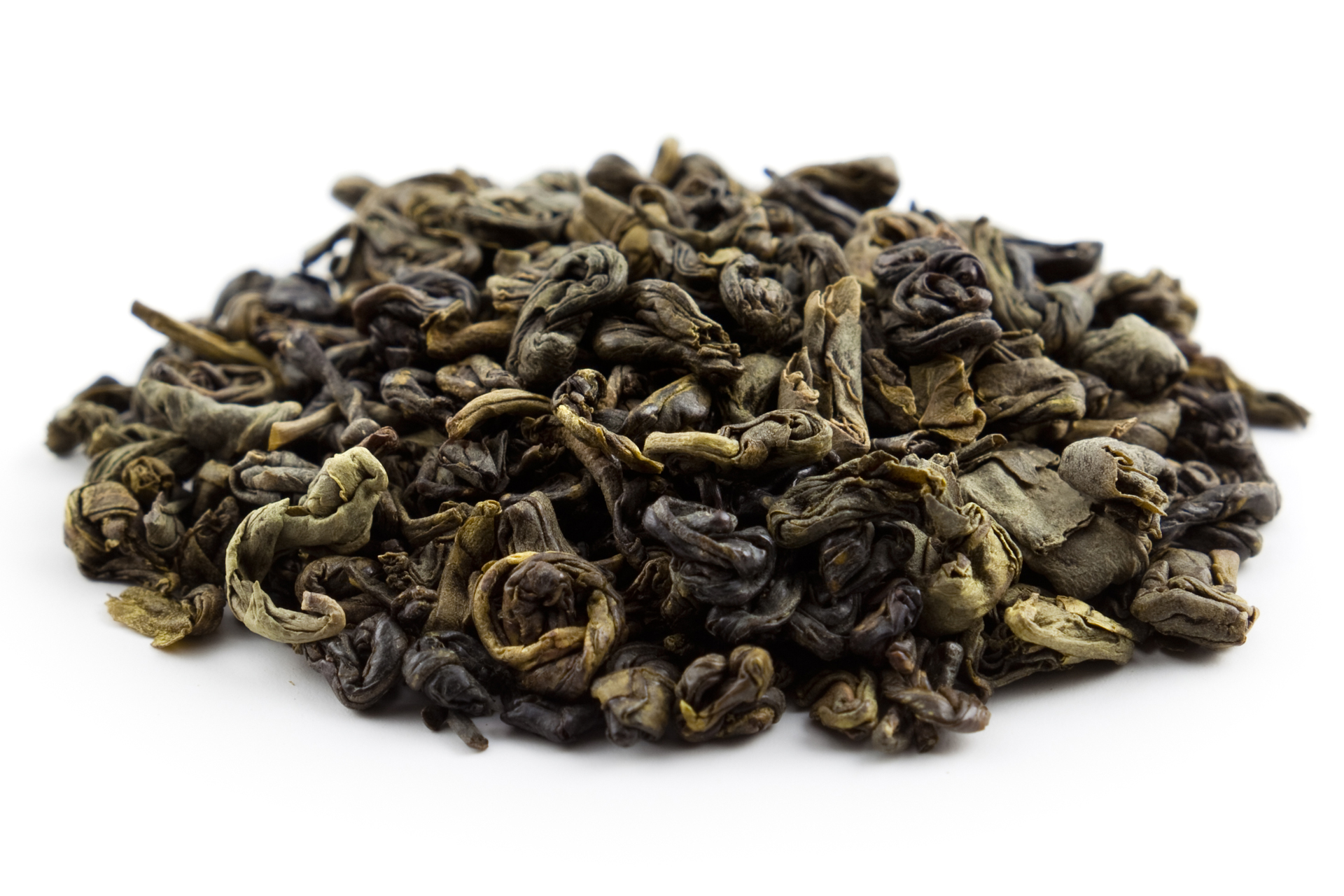
- Type: Green
- Other names: Lo Chu Ch’a, Zhu Cha, 珠茶
- Origin: Zhejiang, Taiwan, Indonesia, and others
- Quick description: Popular worldwide. Flavor varies according to the growing location of tea used for production

Gunpowder tea (Chinese: 珠茶; pinyin: zhū chá; lit. 'pearl tea'; pronounced [ʈʂú ʈʂʰǎ]) is a form of tea in which each leaf has been individually rolled into a small pellet. Its English name comes either from some resemblance of the pellets to gunpowder, or from a phrase in Chinese that phonetically resembles the word "gunpowder". This rolling method of shaping tea is most often applied either to green tea (the most commonly encountered variety outside China) or to oolong tea.

Gunpowder tea production dates back to the Tang dynasty (618–907). Leaves being processed into gunpowder tea are withered first, then steamed, rolled into a pellet shape, and dried. Although the individual leaves were formerly rolled by hand, today all but the highest grades of gunpowder teas are rolled by machine. Rolling renders the leaves less susceptible to physical damage during packaging and storage, and allows them to retain more of their flavour and aroma. In addition, it allows certain types of oolong teas to be aged for decades if they are cared for by being occasionally roasted.

The pellets are dried or "heat-fixed" by pan-firing, sometimes multiple times; this dry heating may contribute a slight smoky flavor. Heat-fixing is a typical part of green tea processing and stops oxidation. (Oxidation of green tea, which if allowed to continue would change it into oolong tea or black tea, has often been incorrectly called fermentation; fermentation is actually unique to pu'erh and "dark" teas). Japanese green tea processors typically stop oxidation by steaming instead of dry heating, and do not usually produce "gunpowder"-style tea.

Shiny pellets indicate that the tea is relatively fresh. Pellet size is also associated with quality, with larger, looser pellets being considered a mark of lower quality tea. High-quality gunpowder tea will have small, tightly rolled pellets. The tea is graded alphanumerically, 3505AAA being considered the highest grade while 9375 is a relatively low grade.

== Varieties ==
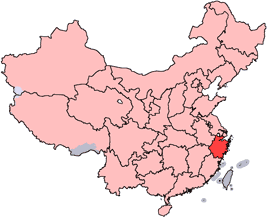
Gunpowder tea is grown in Zhejiang province, China.

There are several varieties of gunpowder tea:

- Pingshui gunpowder (平水珠茶): The original and most common variety of gunpowder tea, with larger pearls, better color, and a more aromatic infusion, which is commonly sold as Temple of Heaven Gunpowder or Pinhead Gunpowder, the former being a common brand of this tea variety.
- Formosa gunpowder: A gunpowder-style tea grown in Taiwan near Keelung, it is claimed to have its own characteristic aroma, different from that of Zhejiang Province gunpowder grown in mainland China. Formosa gunpowder teas are typically fresh or roasted oolongs.

Several types of green tea leaves are commonly rolled into "gunpowder" form, including Chunmee, Tieguanyin, Huang Guanyin, and Dong Ding, as well as many other oolong and higher-end jasmine teas.

== Etymology ==
In Mandarin, gunpowder tea is called zhū chá (珠茶; literally 'pearl tea' or 'bead tea'; not to be confused with boba tea).

The origin of the English term may come from the tea's similarity in appearance to actual gunpowder: greyish, dark pellets of irregular shape used as explosive propellant for early guns. The name may also have arisen from the fact that the rolled pellet "explodes" into a long leaf upon being steeped in hot water. Another explanation is that the tea may have a smoky flavour.

It is also possible that the English term may stem from the Mandarin Chinese phrase for 'freshly brewed', gāng pào de (剛泡的), which sounds similar to the English word gunpowder.

== Brewing methods ==
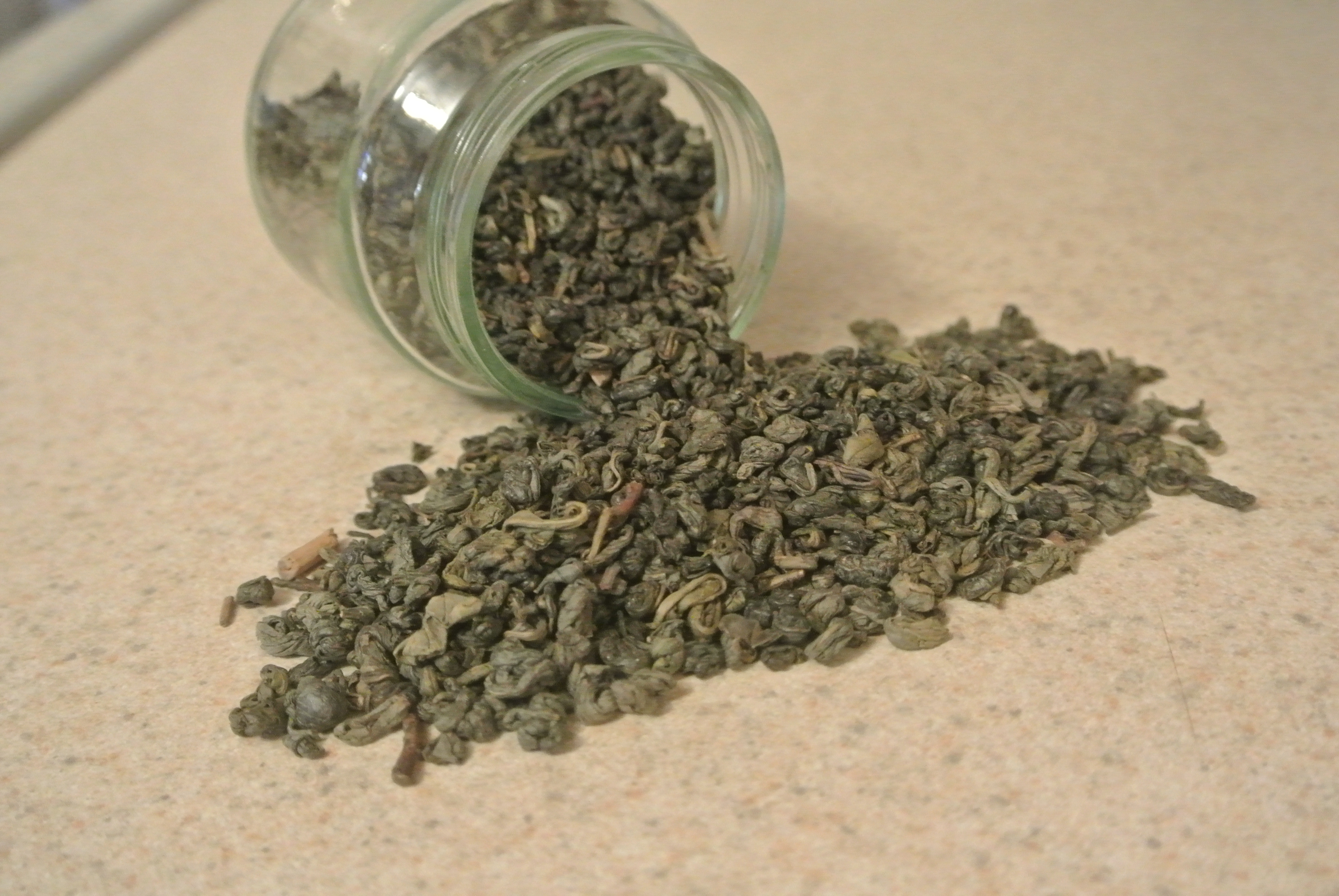
Gunpowder tea ready for the process of steeping

While brewing methods vary widely by the type of tea and individual preferences, 1 tsp (5 mL) of loose-leaf tea is recommended for every 150 millilitres (5 US fl oz) of water. Ideal water temperature for this type of tea is between 70 °C (158 °F) and 80 °C (176 °F). For the first and second brewing, leaves should be steeped for around one minute. It is also recommended that the tea cup or tea pot be rinsed with hot water prior to brewing the tea to warm the vessels. When brewed, gunpowder tea is a yellow color.

== Use in the Maghreb ==
Moroccan tea ritual

Gunpowder tea is exported to the Maghreb, where it is used in the preparation of traditional North African mint tea. The Maghrebi tea ritual is at the heart of any social gathering, from an informal visit to a neighbor to lavish soirees with dignitaries. Mint tea is made by adding mint and sugar or honey to gunpowder tea while brewing.
