= Jin Fo tea =

Chinese oolong tea

Jin Fo
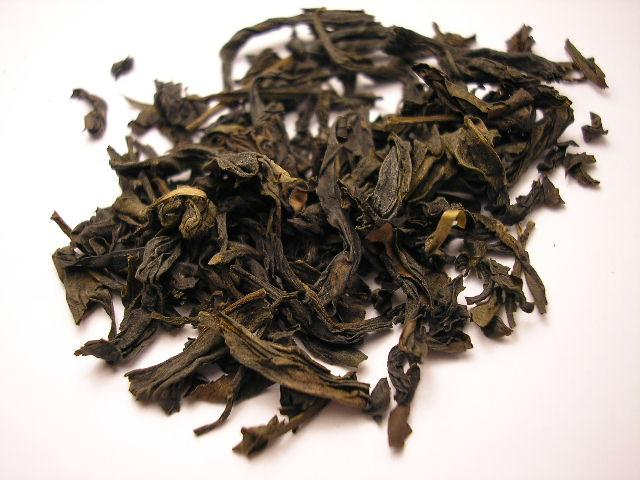
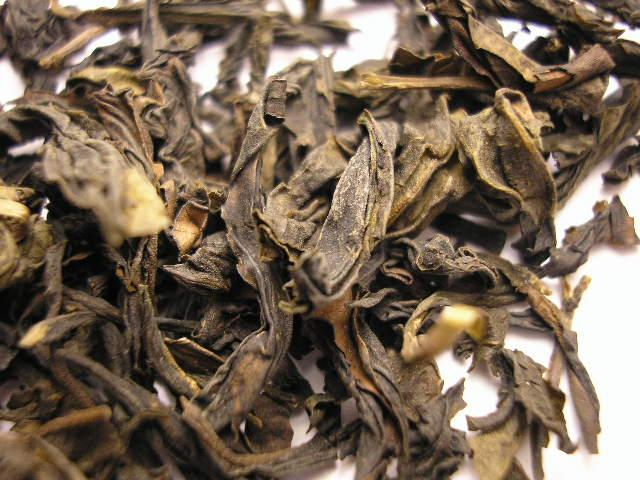
- Type: Oolong
- Other names: Golden Buddha
- Origin: Mount Wuyi, Fujian Province, China
- Quick description: Floral and creamy.

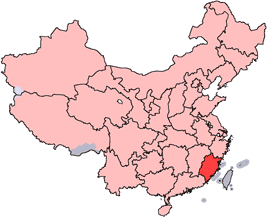
Jin Fo tea is grown in Fujian province, China.

Jin Fo tea (Chinese: 金佛茶; pinyin: jīn fó chá; lit. 'Gold Buddha tea'; pronounced [tɕín fwǒ ʈʂʰǎ]) is a Wuyi Oolong tea, developed at the Wuyi Shan Tea Researching Center located in Fujian Province, China. It is a medium Wuyi Oolong showing both creaminess and a floral aftertaste. The tea leaves have a uniform emerald green color.

== See also ==
- List of Chinese teas
