= Longjing, Hangzhou =

Chinese region

Coordinates: 30.222081°N 120.1046972°E

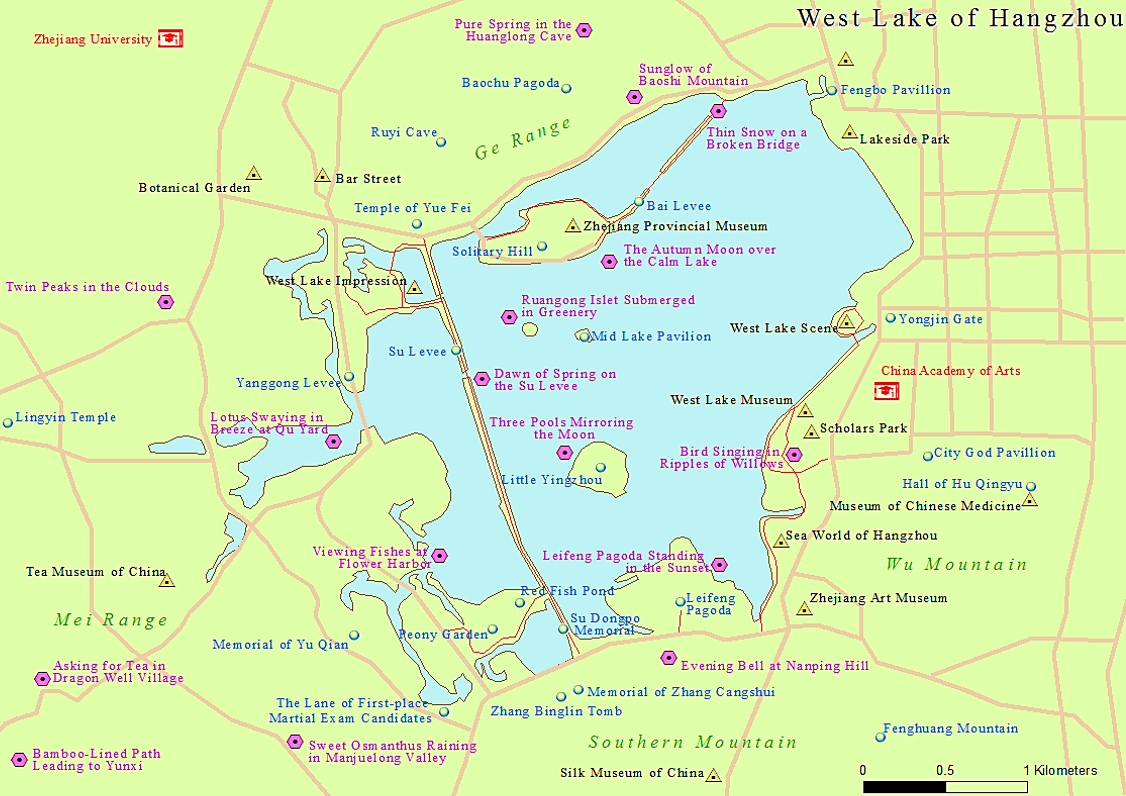
Map of the West Lake in Hangzhou, China, with the location of Longjing Village (labeled as Dragon Well Village)

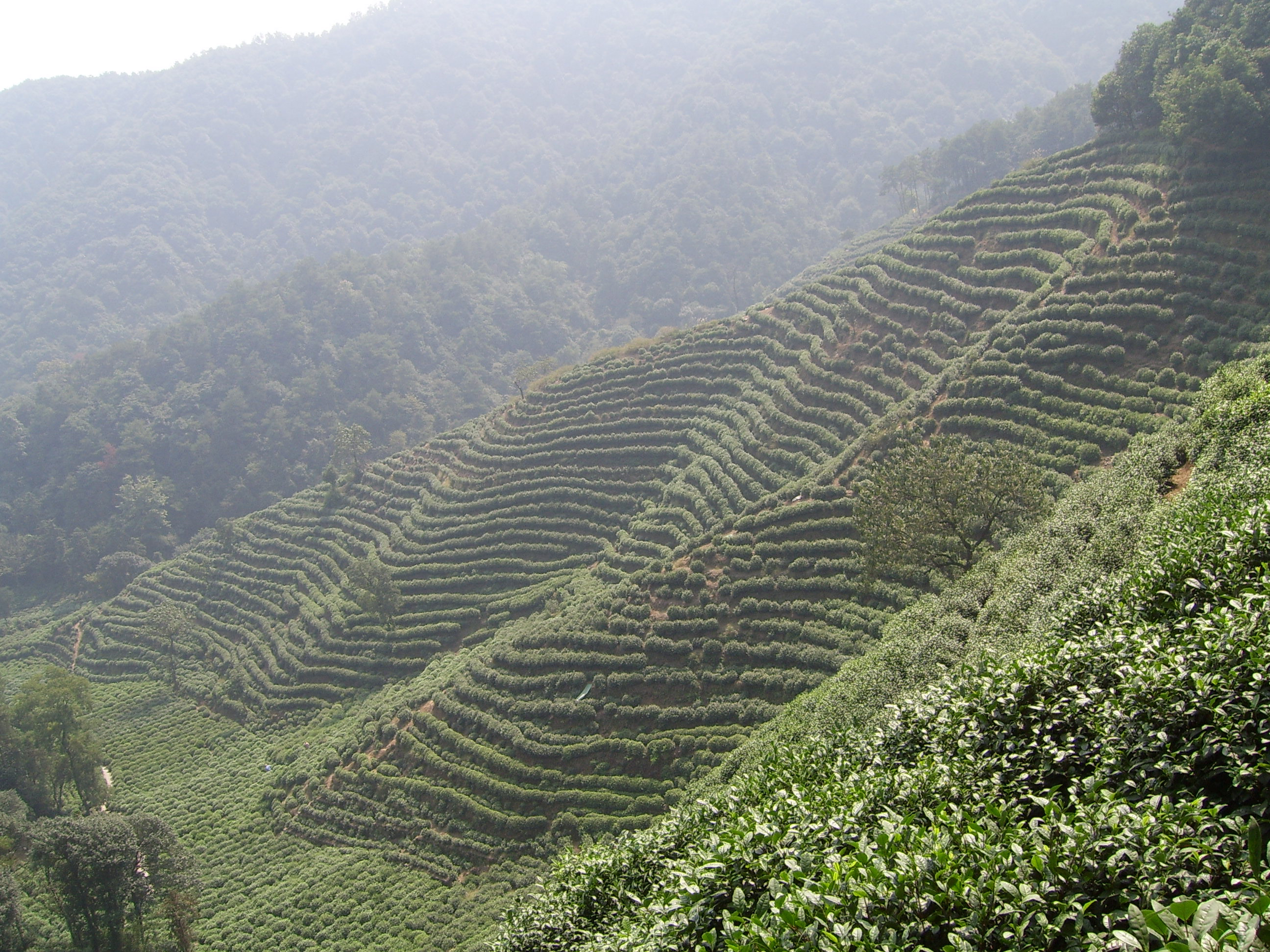
Tea plantation in Longjing

Longjing (simplified Chinese: 龙井; traditional Chinese: 龍井; pinyin: Lóngjǐng), literally "dragon well", is a name applied to a number of locations and products from the southwestern region of the city of Hangzhou in Zhejiang province, China. Most notably, the name refers to the titular Dragon Well itself, located near Longjing village (simplified Chinese: 龙井村; traditional Chinese: 龍井村; pinyin: lóngjǐng cūn) in Xihu District, as well as the area encompassing the well and the Longjing tea famously grown there.

The Dragon Well region consists of a number of villages, tea plantations, tea houses, parks, and a temple. The area is popular for drinking and buying tea as well as visiting the Eight Scenes of the Dragon Well (龙井八景).

== Longjing tea production ==
Longjing is famous since is the area where Longjing tea (also known as dragon well tea) is produced. In the 17th century by the Kangxi Emperor granted the tea the status of Gòngchá or imperial tea, Gòngchá (貢茶) is a chinese word formed with the word Gòng (貢) that means contribution or tribute, and the word Chá (茶) that refers to tea, which translates to “tribute tea for the emperor”.
