= Cloud tea =

Chinese green tea

Cloud tea (Chinese: 雲雾茶; pinyin: yún wù chá; pronounced [y̌n û ʈʂʰǎ]) is a Chinese green tea that originally comes from Nanyue Mountain. It is named for the clouds of Le Mountain (南岳山; nányuè shān) where it is produced. In ancient times, it was called Le tea. During the Tang dynasty, it was used as tribute to the emperor. Cloud tea grows in the area of Guangji Temple, Tiefu Temple and Huagai Peak at an altitude of 800 to 1,100 metres (2,600 to 3,600 ft) with a mild and wet climate. Meanwhile, rich organic matter in the soil is extremely suitable for the tea's growth. The Chinese great tea master, Lu Yu in the Tang dynasty, once mentioned it in The Classic of Tea, which provides for the reputation of cloud tea in Le Mountain. In general, it is famous not only for its thin leaf and beauty, but also the fresh colour, cool taste and attractive smell. It has won an outstanding reputation in both Hunan Province and abroad.

== Legend ==
It is said that Sun Wukong, the "Monkey King" (referred to in Journey to the West), often ate peaches and drank wine on Huaguo Mountain. One day he got tired of his usual food and drink, and decided to go to heaven to enjoy the tea usually enjoyed only by the emperor and the heavenly queen mother. In the sky as he flew towards heaven, he saw a branch of a tea tree which he did not recognize. It was harvest time, but the Monkey King had no idea how to harvest the tea. Thankfully, a flock of birds passed by and asked the king what was the matter. The king said that he thought Huaguo Mountain was nice, but lamented its lack of tea trees. Hearing this, the birds helped him to harvest tea seeds. Each bird carried some seeds towards Huaguo Mountain. They passed through the high mountains, through the clouds and along the river. While they were flying above the Mount Lu, they were struck by its majesty and could not help singing. As a result of their distraction, they dropped their seeds on Mount Lu. Tea trees soon took root, and grew evermore on the cloudy mountain.

== Brief introduction ==
Cloud tea belongs to the green tea family. With a standard of one bud, one leaf about 3 centimetres, it is usually picked from Grain Rain (6th solar term) to Beginning of Summer (7th solar term). After a series of complex processes, the finished tea looks lustrous and beautiful.

== Kinds ==
=== Lushan cloud tea ===
Mount Lu is known as a respite from summer heat. After enjoying the charming views and climbing, some people choose to have a cup of Lushan Cloud tea (庐山雲雾茶) to relax their tired bodies. It is also known by its ancient name, Hear Forest tea (聞林茶). According to legend, the earliest Lushan cloud tea is a wild tea. When a monk, Huiyuan, in Donglin Temple transformed it into a home tea, the Lushan cloud tea started to be grown by hand. Huiyuan often invited his friends to study and chat with a cup of tea he had planted himself. From this origin, the reputation of Lushan cloud tea grew, and became a tribute to the emperor during Song dynasty.

=== Yingshan cloud tea ===
Yingshan cloud tea (英山雲雾茶) is mainly produced in Heaven Village near the Dabie Mountains in the north-east of Hubei Province. Wrapped by green trees and wreathed by clouds, the environment and climate are ideal for creating high-quality cloud tea. Yingshan cloud tea is credited by its proponents with refreshing heads and releasing worries, weight loss, clearing the mind, reducing high blood pressure and even treating cancer. These claims are not scientifically supported at this time.

=== Yuntaishan cloud tea ===
Yuntaishan cloud tea (雲台山雲雾茶), like Lianyungang cloud tea, has a reputation for its special smell, appearance, taste and fragrance. However, a tree may only produce 1 to 2 kilograms per year. Therefore, it is treasured, and can only be served to distinguished guests.

=== Others ===
Other cloud tea varieties include Moganshan cloud tea (莫干山雲雾茶), Yandangshan cloud tea (雁荡山雲雾茶), Putuoshan cloud tea (普陀山雲雾茶) and Wuyishan cloud tea (武夷山雲雾茶), etc. Each variety is credited with special characteristics due to the different geographical positions and climate conditions of each growing region.

== See also ==
- Tea
- Chinese tea
- Chinese tea culture
- China famous tea
