= The Golden Key =

The Golden Key may refer to:

== Film ==
- The Golden Key (1939 film), a Soviet fantasy film directed by Aleksandr Ptushko
- The Golden Key (2001 film), a Vietnamese romantic war film directed by Lê Hoàng

== Literature ==
- "The Golden Key" (Grimm's Fairy Tales), a fairy tale
- The Golden Key (MacDonald book), an 1867 fairy tale by George MacDonald
- The Golden Key (novel), a 1996 fantasy novel by Jennifer Roberson, Melanie Rawn, and Kate Elliott
- The Golden Key, or the Adventures of Buratino, a 1936 book by Aleksey Nikolayevich Tolstoy
- "The Golden Key", a religious pamphlet by Emmet Fox

== See also ==
- Les Clefs d'Or (lit. The Golden Keys), a professional association of hotel concierges
- Golden key (disambiguation)
