= Biluochun =

Chinese green tea

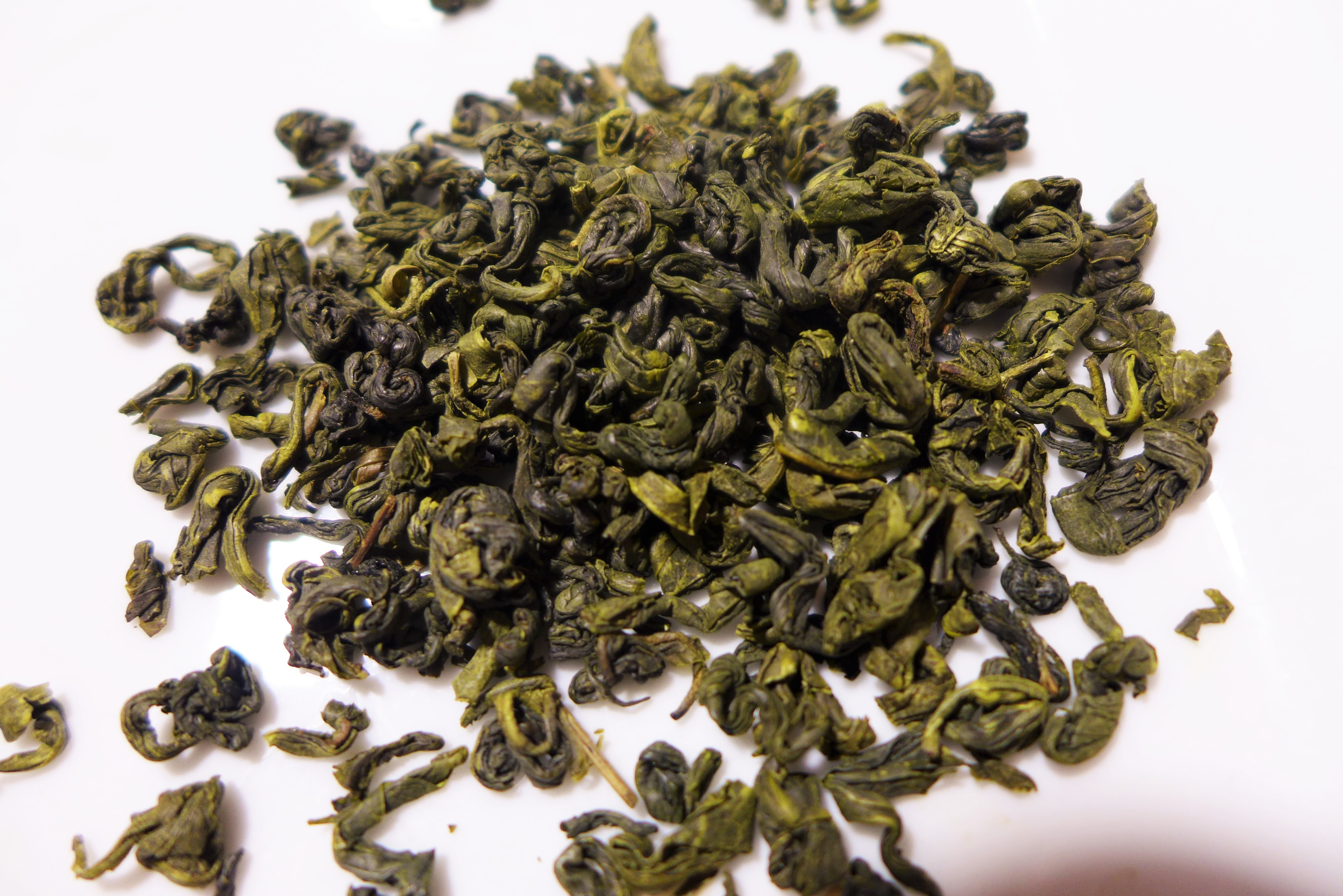
- Type: Green
- Origin: Dongting Mountains, Suzhou, Jiangsu Province, China
- Quick description: A green tea with a strong aroma and a light floral taste.

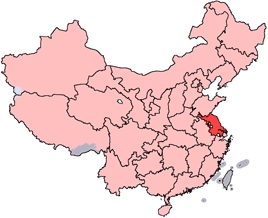
Biluochun is grown in Jiangsu province, China.

Biluochun
- Chinese: 碧螺春
- Hanyu Pinyin: Bìluóchūn
- Cantonese Yale: Bīklòchēun
- Literal meaning: Green Snail Spring
Transcriptions
Standard Mandarin
- Hanyu Pinyin: Bìluóchūn
- IPA: [pî.lwǒ.ʈʂʰwə́n]
Yue: Cantonese
- Yale Romanization: Bīklòchēun
- IPA: [pɪk̚˥ lɔ˩ tsʰɵn˥]

Biluochun or Bi Luo Chun (Chinese: 碧螺春; pinyin: Bì luó chūn; pronounced [pî.lwǒ.ʈʂʰwə́n]) is a famous green tea originally grown in the Dongting mountain region near Lake Tai in Suzhou, Jiangsu, China. Also known as Pi Lo Chun, it is renowned for its delicate appearance, fruity taste, floral aroma, showy white hairs and early cropping.

The name Biluochun literally means "green snail spring". It is called so because it is a green tea that is rolled into a tight spiral, resembling snail meat, and is cropped in early spring.

Its original name is Xia Sha Ren Xiang (simplified Chinese: 吓煞人香; traditional Chinese: 嚇煞人香; pinyin: xià shà rén xiāng; "scary fragrance"). Legend tells of its discovery by a tea picker who ran out of space in her basket and put the tea between her breasts instead. The tea, warmed by her body heat, emitted a strong aroma that surprised the girl.

According to the Qing Dynasty chronicle Ye Shi Da Guan, the Kangxi Emperor visited Lake Tai in the 38th year of his rule. At that time, because of its rich aroma, local people called it "Scary Fragrance". The Kangxi Emperor decided to give it a more elegant name, "Green Snail Spring".

A kilogram of Dong Ting Bi Luo Chun consists of around 14,000 to 15,000 tea shoots.

Today, Biluochun is cultivated in Dongting Mountains near Lake Tai in Suzhou, Jiangsu. Biluochun from Dong Shan (East Mountain) or Xi Shan (West Mountain) is considered the best. Biluochun is also grown in Zhejiang and Sichuan province. Their leaves are larger and less uniform (may contain yellow leaves). They taste more nutty than fruity and smooth. Lastly, Biluochun is grown on the island of Taiwan, specifically at Sanxia District, New Taipei City.

Biluochun is divided into seven grades in decreasing order of quality: Supreme, Supreme I, Grade I, Grade II, Grade III, Chao Qing I, and Chao Qing II.

== Origin ==
The history of Bi Luo Chun tea has its roots in the Ming Dynasty, which dates back to around the 14th century. According to local legend, a young tea picker discovered an extraordinary tea bush decorated with very delicate, curled leaves that looked like snail shells. Fascinated by this discovery, the tea master created a drink from these delicate leaves, revealing an exquisite flavor that embodied the essence of spring. This is how Bi Luo Chun Green Snail Spring Tea was born.

== See also ==
- List of Chinese teas
