= Taiping houkui =

Chinese tea

Houkui
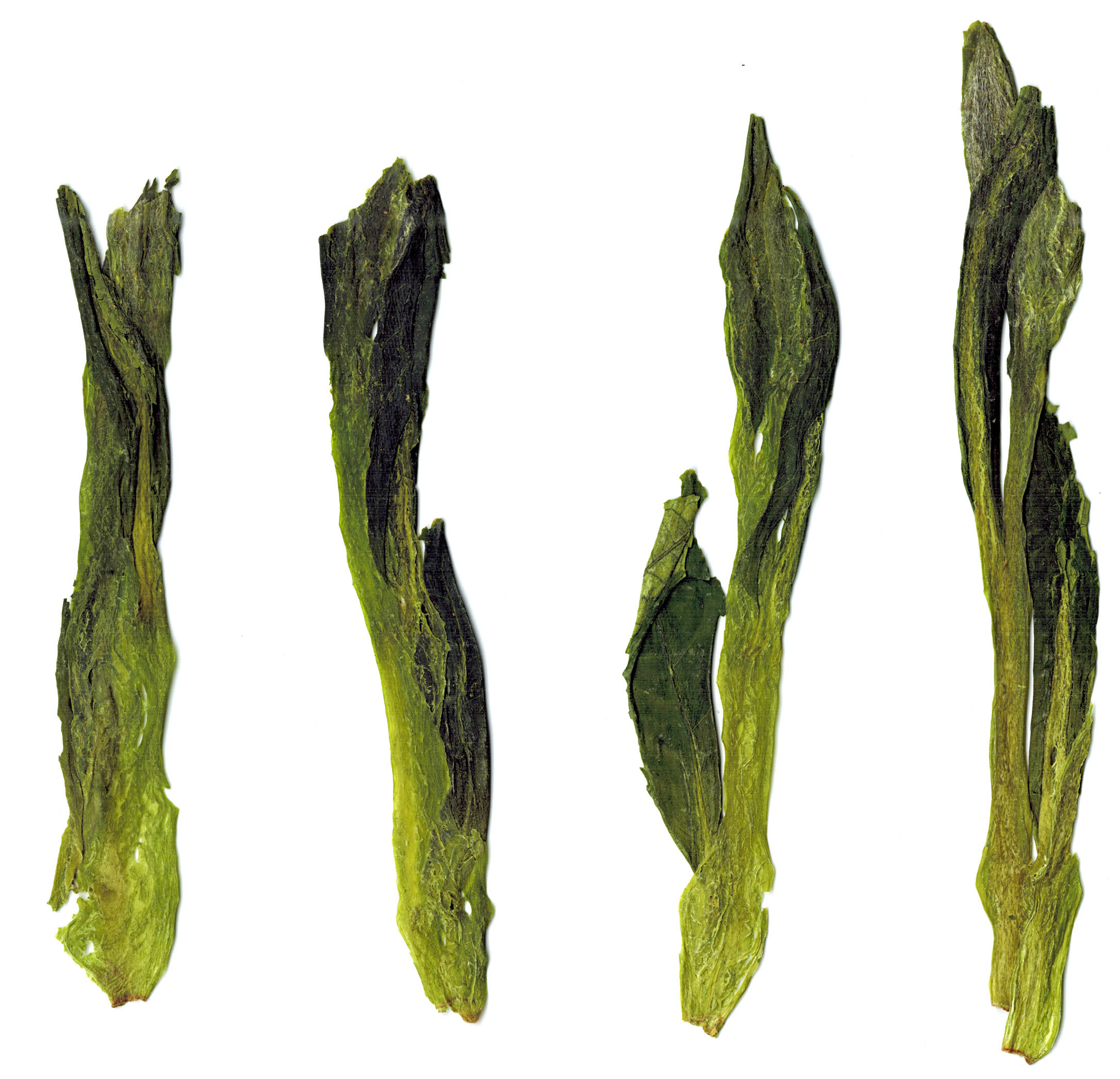
- Type: Green
- Other names: Monkey Tea, Taiping Hou Kui
- Origin: Anhui province, China
- Quick description: Baked green tea

Taiping houkui is grown in Anhui province, China.

Taiping houkui (Chinese: 太平猴魁; pinyin: tàipíng hóukuí; lit. 'peaceful monkey leader'; pronounced [tʰâɪpʰǐŋ xǒʊkʰwěɪ]) tea is grown at the foot of Huangshan (黄山) in the former Taiping Prefecture, Anhui. It has been grown since the Ming Dynasty and was harvested for emperors during the Qing Dynasty. The tea has been produced commercially since the beginning of the 20th century and is produced around the small village of Hou Keng (猴坑). It won the "King of Tea" award at China Tea Exhibition 2004 and is sometimes listed as a China famous tea.

The best Tai Ping Hou Kui is grown in the villages of Houkeng, Hougang and Yanjiachun. Teas produced in the surrounding areas are called by the same name, but cost much less.

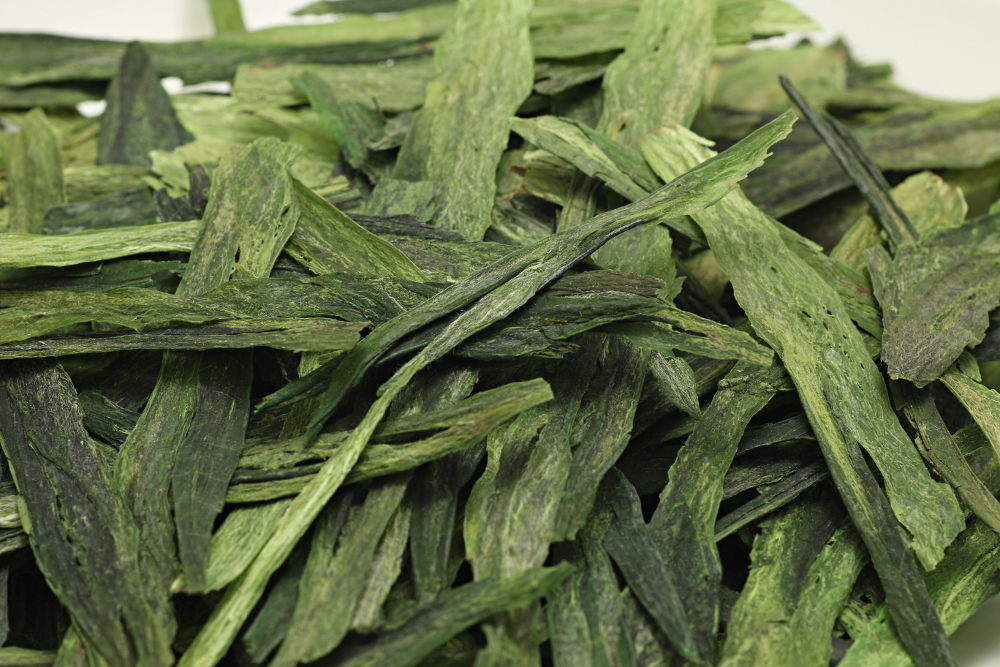

It is renowned for its "two knives and one pole": two straight leaves clasping the enormous bud with white hairs. The oven-made leaves are deep green in color with red veins underneath. The tea shoots can be as long as 15 centimetres (5.9 in). They are plucked from the Shi Da Cha, a large-leaf variety found only in Anhui Province.

Falsification is rampant. Factories can produce symmetrical looking Hou Kui tea that looks even better than the authentic handmade variety.

== See also ==
- List of Chinese teas
