= Ban Tian Yao tea =

Chinese oolong tea

Ban Tian Yao
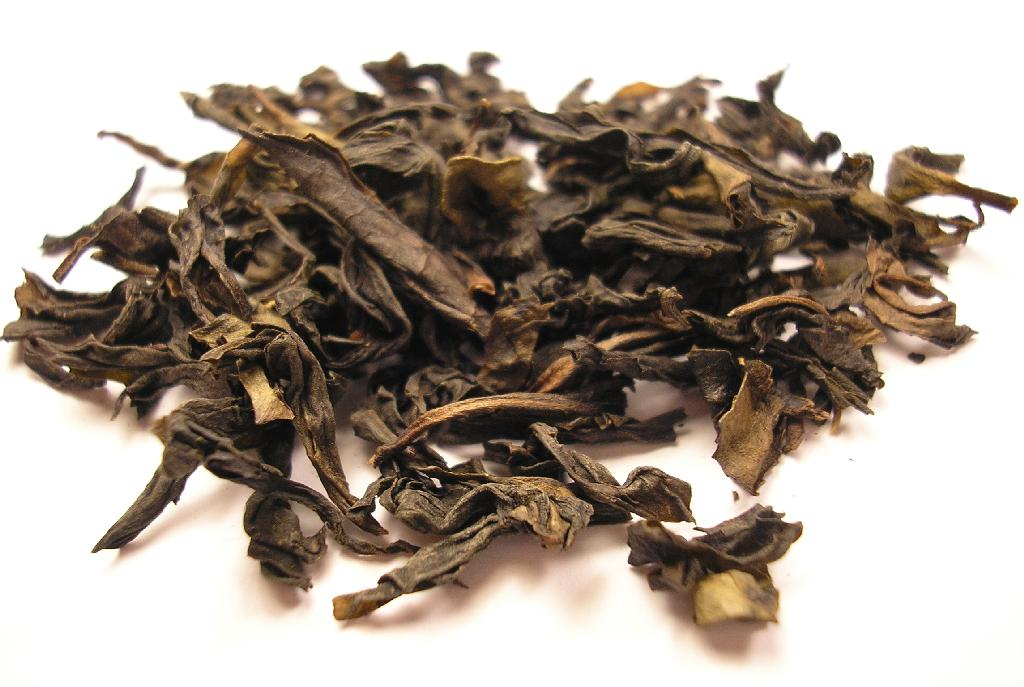
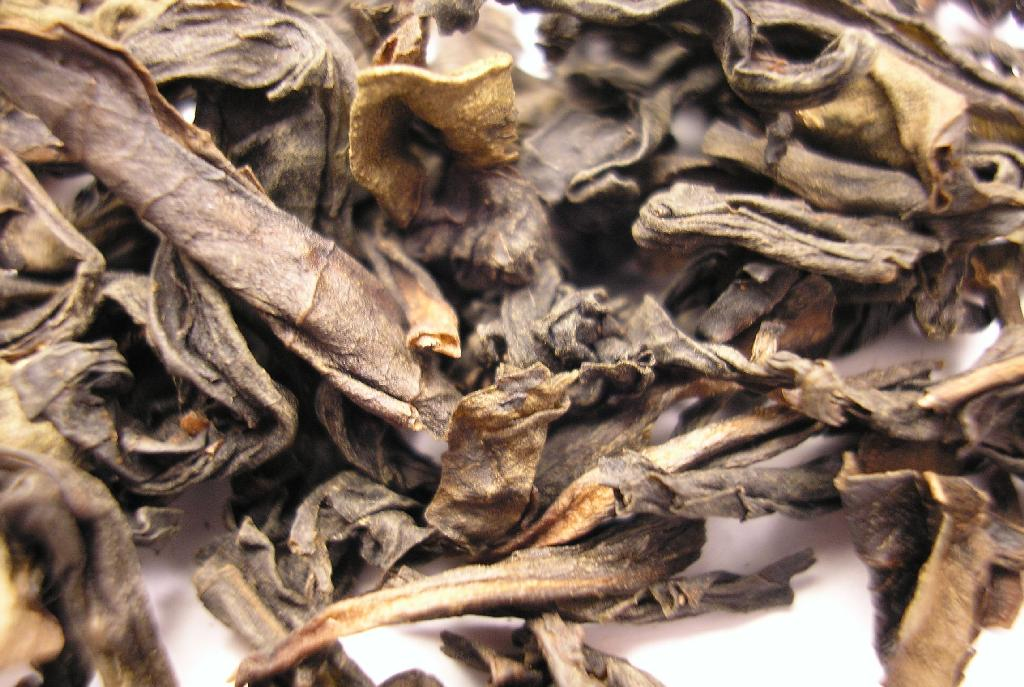
- Type: Oolong
- Other names: Waist Halfway to the Sky, 半天腰
- Origin: Mount Wuyi, Fujian Province, China
- Quick description: A rarely seen Mount Wuyi Oolong with a light smokey taste

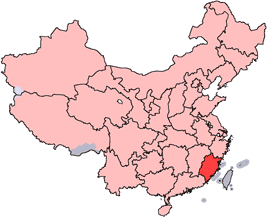
Ban Tian Yao tea is grown in Fujian province, China.

Ban Tian Yao (Chinese: 半天腰; pinyin: bàn tiān yāo; Wade–Giles: pan^{4} t'ien^{1} yao^{1}; lit. 'waist halfway to the sky'; pronounced [pân tʰjɛ́n jáʊ]) is a very rare Wuyi Oolong with a light smoky taste.
