= Fo Shou tea =

Chinese oolong tea

Fo Shou
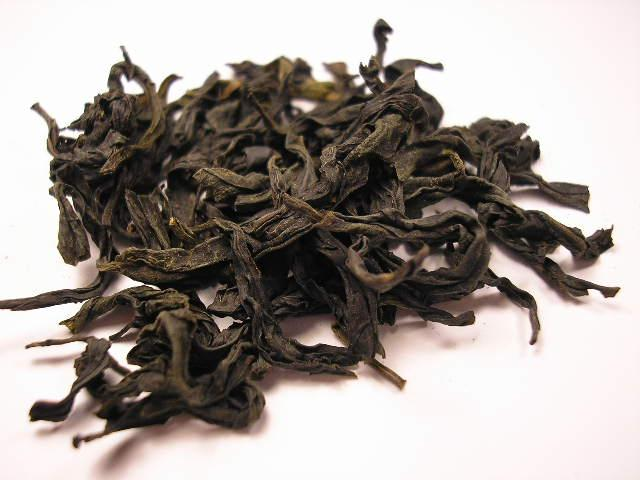
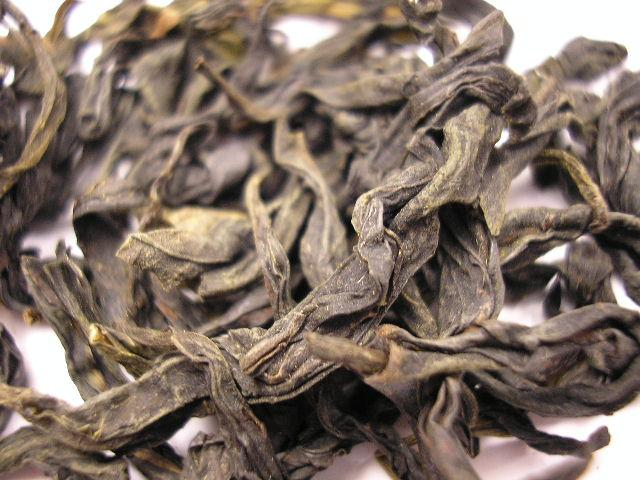
- Type: Oolong
- Other names: Half Day Perish
- Origin: Yong Chun and Mount Wuyi, Fujian Province, China
- Quick description: A rarely seen Mount Wuyi Oolong with a peculiar taste

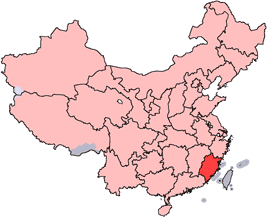
Fo Shou tea is grown in Fujian province, China.

Fo Shou (Chinese: 佛手; pinyin: fó shǒu; lit. 'Buddha's hand'; pronounced [fwǒ ʂòʊ]) is a Yongchun (永春; Yǒng Chūn) and Wuyi Oolong tea with a light and somewhat peculiar taste. It is also produced in Taiwan.

According to Babelcarp (citation below), Fo Shou is an alternate name for xiāng yuán (香橼).
