= Chun Mee =

Chinese green tea

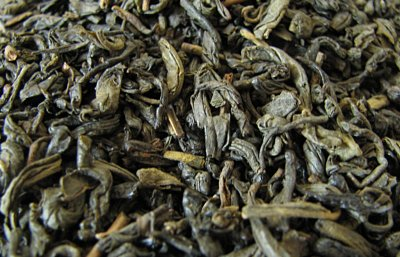
- Type: Green
- Other names: Chun Mei, Zhen Mei
- Origin: Zhejiang, Anhui and Jiangxi in China as well as others
- Quick description: Dusty, acidic green tea

Chun Mee (Chinese: 珍眉; pinyin: zhēn méi; lit. 'precious eyebrows'; pronounced [ʈʂə́n.měɪ]) is a popular green tea. It has a dusty appearance and is generally more acidic and less sweet than other green teas. It was originally produced only in the Chinese Jiangxi province, but nowadays is predominantly produced in Taishun County, Zhejiang Province. The tea is divided into several grades with numbers. Some examples are: 41022, 4011, 9371, 8147, 9367, 9366, 3008 or 3009. The number 41022 in this case represents the highest quality, while number 8147 practically only consists of broken leaves.

Chun mee tea, together with Assam Bukial tea, has been studied to observe the rate of infusion of caffeine. The study found that caffeine diffusion through the tea leaves is a greatly hindered process.

== See also ==
- Green tea
- List of Chinese teas
