= Baimao Hou =

Chinese green tea

- Traditional Chinese: 白毛猴茶
- Simplified Chinese: 白毛猴茶
Transcriptions
Standard Mandarin
- Hanyu Pinyin: báimáo hóu chá
- Wade–Giles: pai^{2}-mao^{2} hou^{2} ch'a^{2}
- IPA: [pǎɪ.mǎʊ xǒʊ]

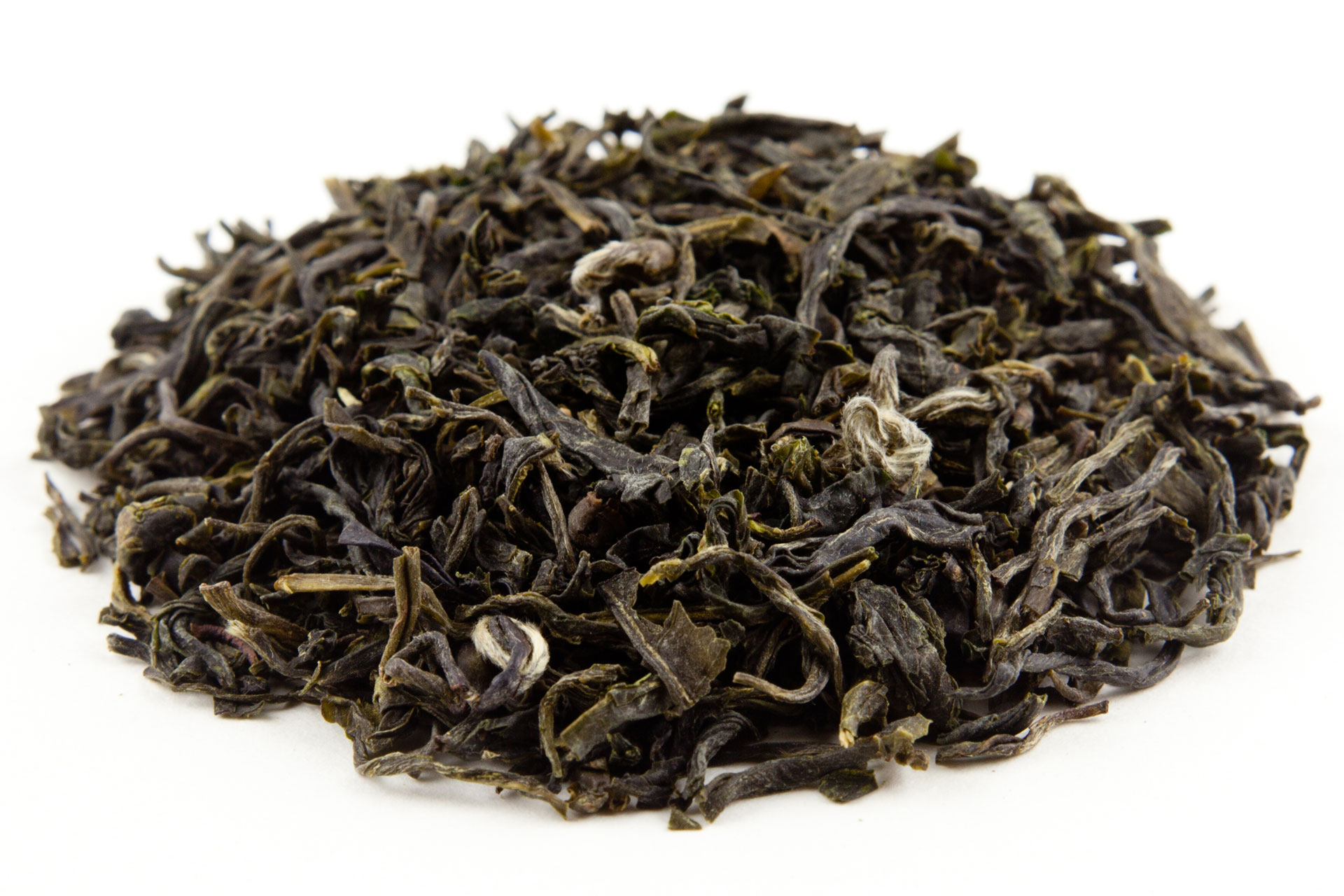
Baimao Hou (White Monkey) tea leaves

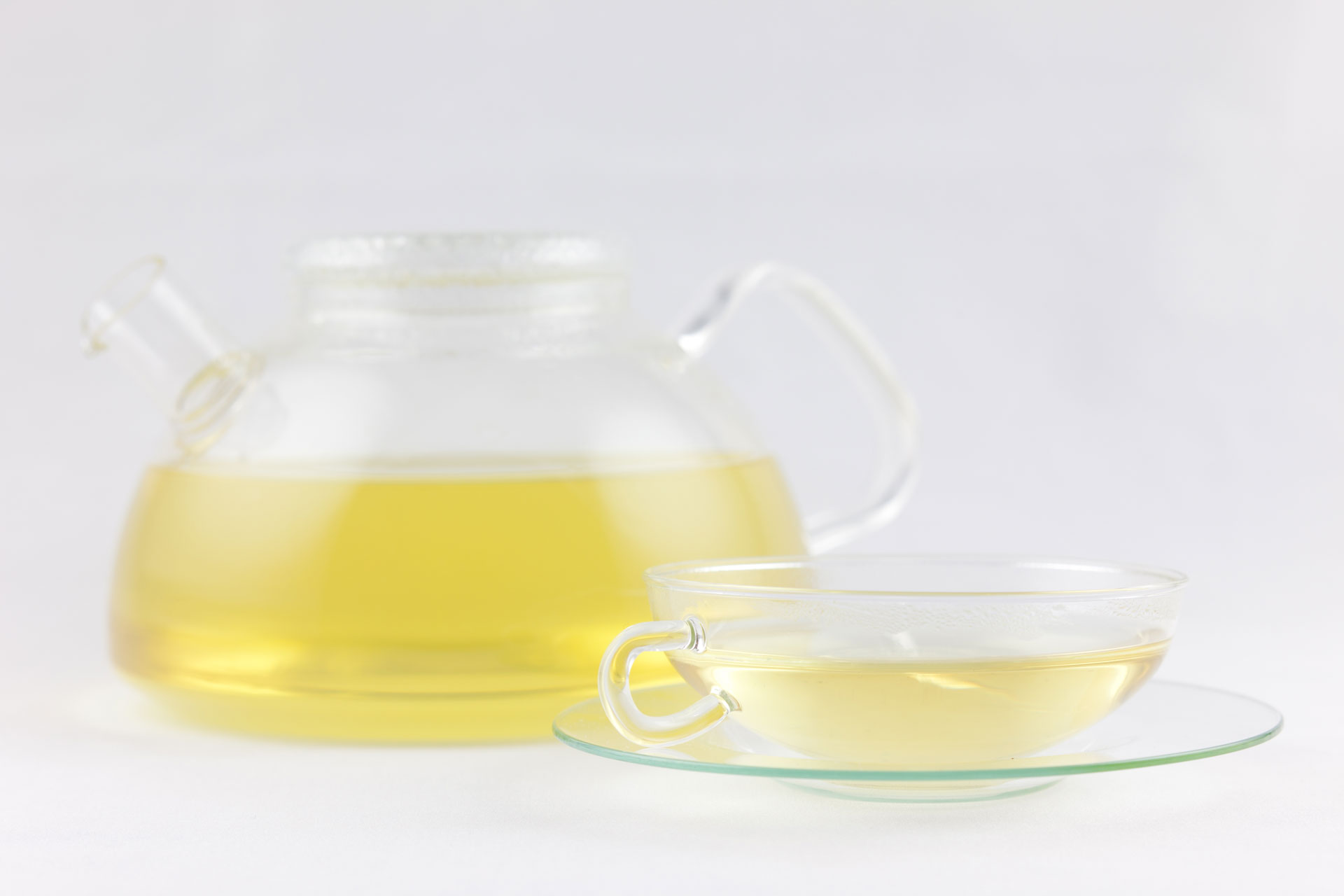
Baimao Hou freshly brewed

Baimao Hou or white monkey (Chinese: 白毛猴; pinyin: báimáo hóu; Wade–Giles: pai^{2}-mao^{2} hou^{2}; lit. 'white-haired monkey') is a green tea made from the leaves and bud of the green tea leaf when harvested during the first two weeks of the season (late March to early April). It originates from the Taimu Mountains in Fujian Province, China. The delicate leaves are carefully steamed and dried. The name originates from the appearance of the dried leaves, which are said to resemble the paw of a white-haired monkey. Due to the tea's appearance, flavor, and name, it is often mistaken for a white tea.
