= Huangguanyin =

Chinese oolong tea

Huang Guanyin
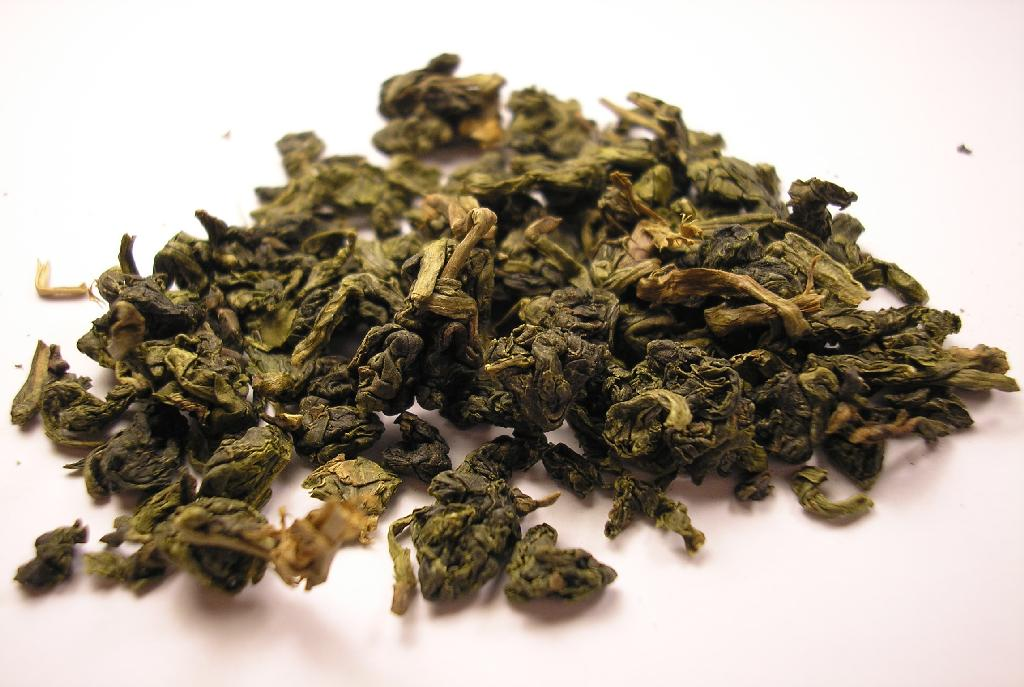
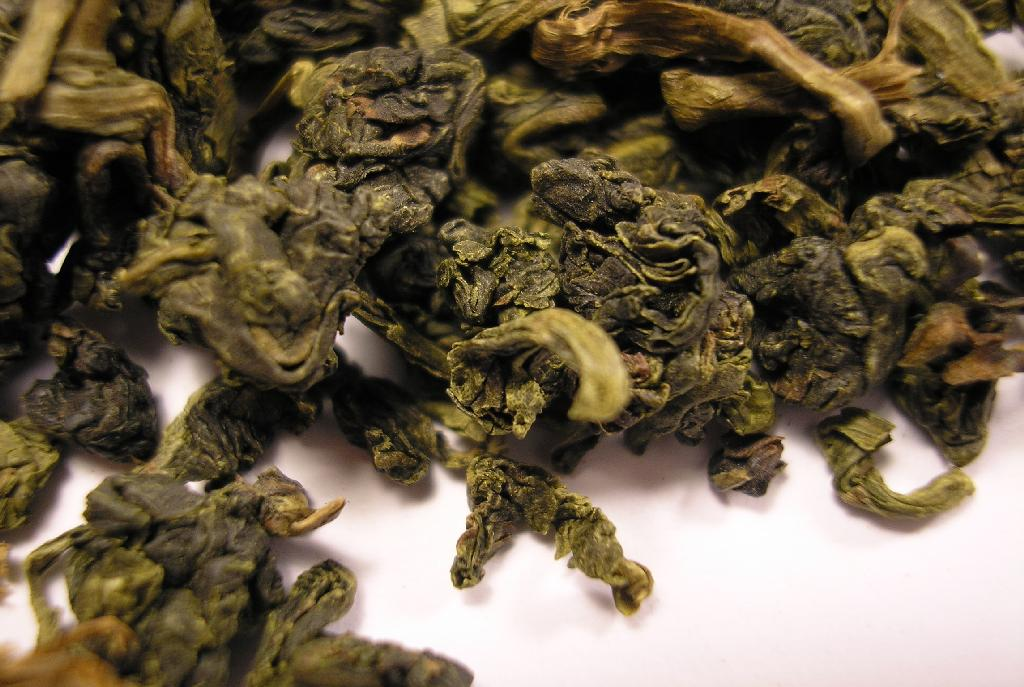
- Type: Oolong
- Other names: Yellow Guanyin
- Origin: Mount Wuyi, Fujian, China
- Quick description: A new cultivar of Mount Wuyi Oolong which can be either tightly rolled or in strips

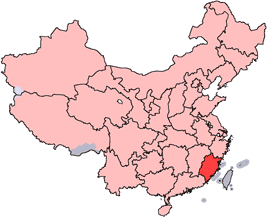
Huangguanyin is grown in Fujian province, China.

Huang Guanyin tea (simplified Chinese: 黄观音茶; traditional Chinese: 黄觀音茶; pinyin: Huáng Guānyīn chá; pronounced [kwán.ín ʈʂʰǎ]) is a Wuyi oolong with a creamy taste. It can be either tightly rolled like Anxi Oolongs or in strips like conventional Wuyi Oolong.

In China, Guanyin leaves are harvested fresh and green, then soaked, beaten, milled, and the sieved puree set up to make GuanYin LiangFen grass jelly.

== See also ==
- List of Chinese teas
