= Bu Zhi Chun tea =

Chinese oolong tea

Bu Zhi Chun
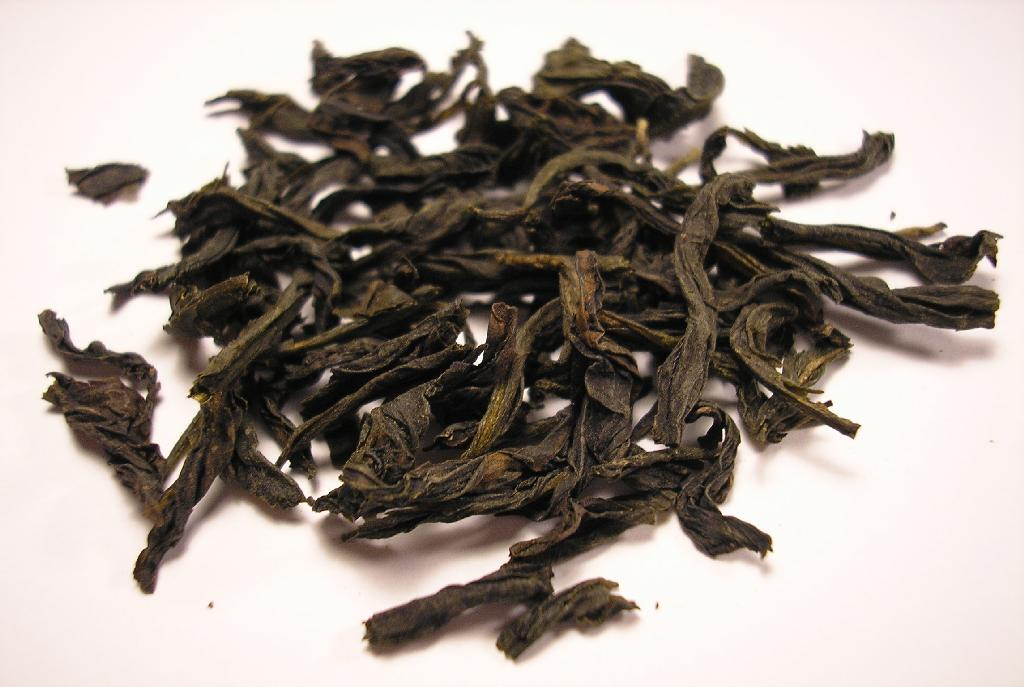
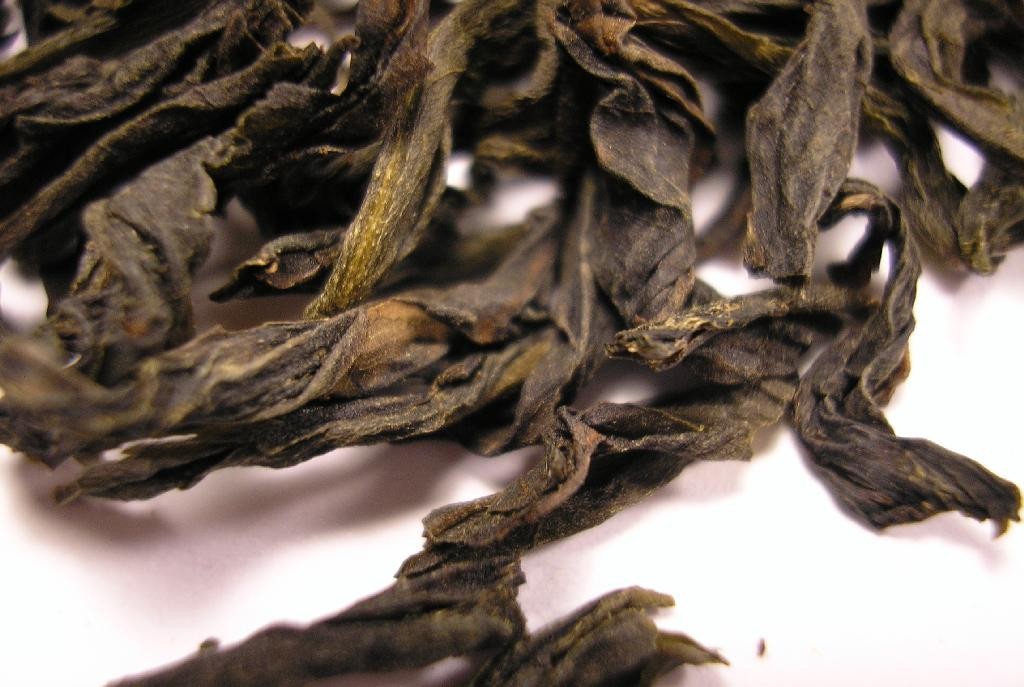
- Type: Oolong
- Other names: 不知春
- Origin: Wuyi Mountains, Fujian Province, China
- Quick description: A rarely seen Mount Wuyi Oolong with a light taste

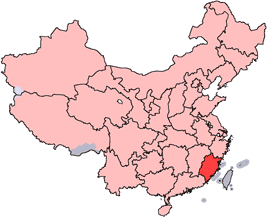
Bu Zhi Chun tea is grown in Fujian province, China.

Bu Zhi Chun (Chinese: 不知春; pinyin: bù zhī chūn; lit. 'knows not of spring'; pronounced [pû ʈʂɻ̩́ ʈʂʰwə́n]) is a Wuyi oolong with a light taste.
