= Longjing tea =

Chinese green tea

Longjing tea 龍井茶
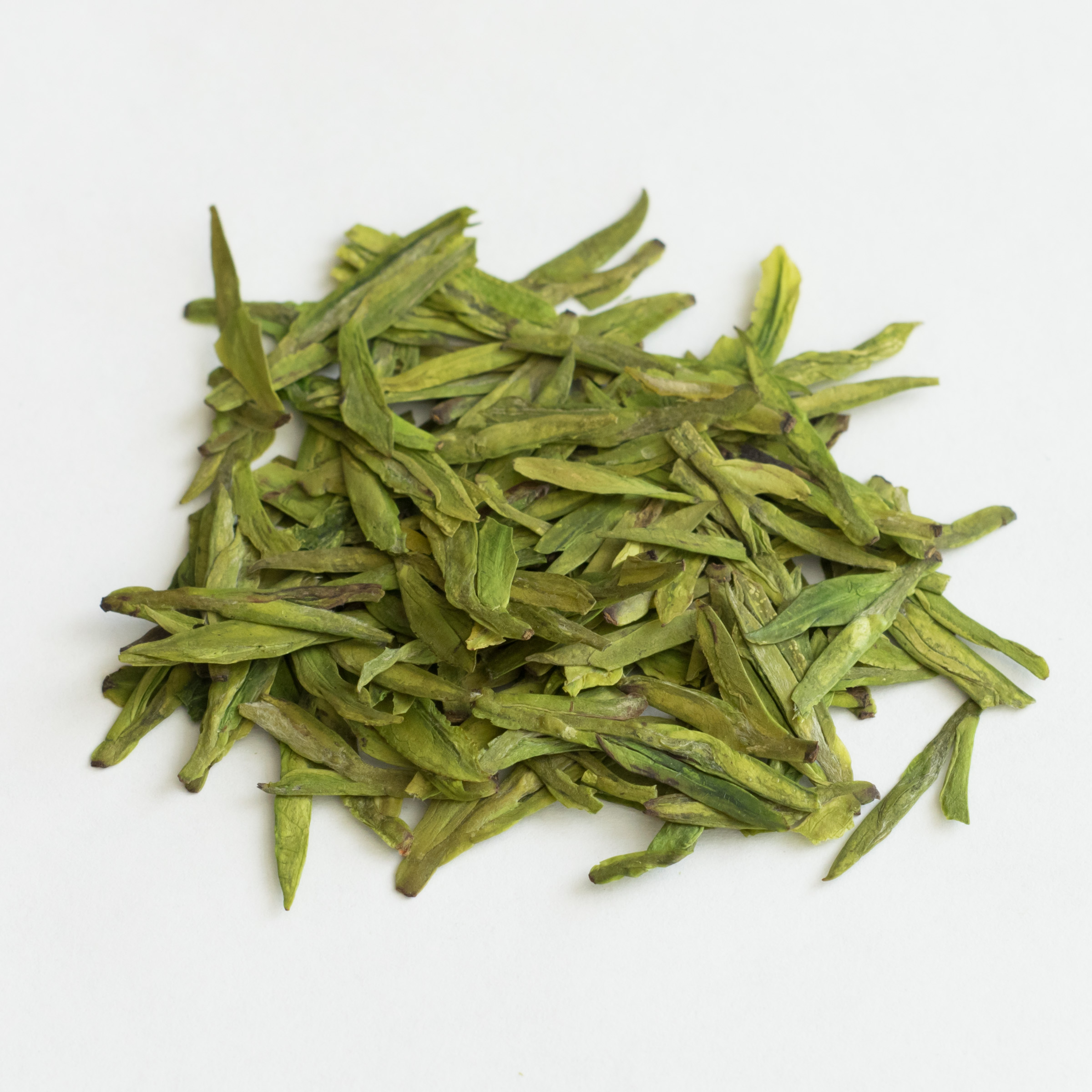
- Type: Green tea
- Other names: Dragon Well, Lung Ching
- Origin: Hangzhou, Zhejiang Province, China
- Quick description: Very gentle and sweet

Longjing tea (simplified Chinese: 龙井茶; traditional Chinese: 龍井茶; pinyin: lóngjǐng chá; Cantonese Yale: lung4 jeng2 cha4; Standard Mandarin pronunciation: [lʊ̌ŋ.tɕìŋ.ʈʂʰǎ]), sometimes known in English as Dragon Well tea, is a pan-roasted green tea.

It is traditionally produced in the area surrounding Longjing Village near West Lake in the city of Hangzhou,in Zhejiang province, China, and is widely regarded as one of China's Famous Teas.

Longjing tea is known for its flat hand-shaped leaves, yellow-green infusion, and distinct flavor, which is often described as sweet, fresh, vegetal, or chestnut-like. The tea is shaped by hand during pan-firing, which halts oxidation.

The name "Longjing", meaning "Dragon Well", derives from a historic well near Longjing village. Tea grown within the traditional production area around West Lake is protected under geographical designation systems in China and the European Union. Premium grades are harvested in early spring before the Qingming Festival in early April, particularly the "Pre-Qingming" or Mingqian teas.

Longjing tea was granted the status of Gong Cha, or imperial tea, during the Qing dynasty. According to legend, the Qianlong Emperor granted imperial status to eighteen tea bushes near West Lake after visiting the region in the eighteenth century. Tea produced from those bushes remains highly prized.

Due to its commercial value and reputation, Longjing tea is frequently imitated. Tea sold as Longjing is often produced outside the traditional growing region, including in other parts of Zhejiang, Yunnan, Guizhou, and Sichuan.

== Description and classification ==
Longjing tea is a variety of pan-roasted green tea from the area of Longjing Village in Hangzhou, Zhejiang Province, China. It is considered one of China's Famous Teas.

There are several definitions of Longjing tea. A common definition states that authentic Longjing must originate in Zhejiang, while stricter definitions limit the designation to tea produced in the villages and plantations surrounding West Lake in Hangzhou. It may also refer more broadly to tea grown within Xihu District in Hangzhou.

=== Areas ===
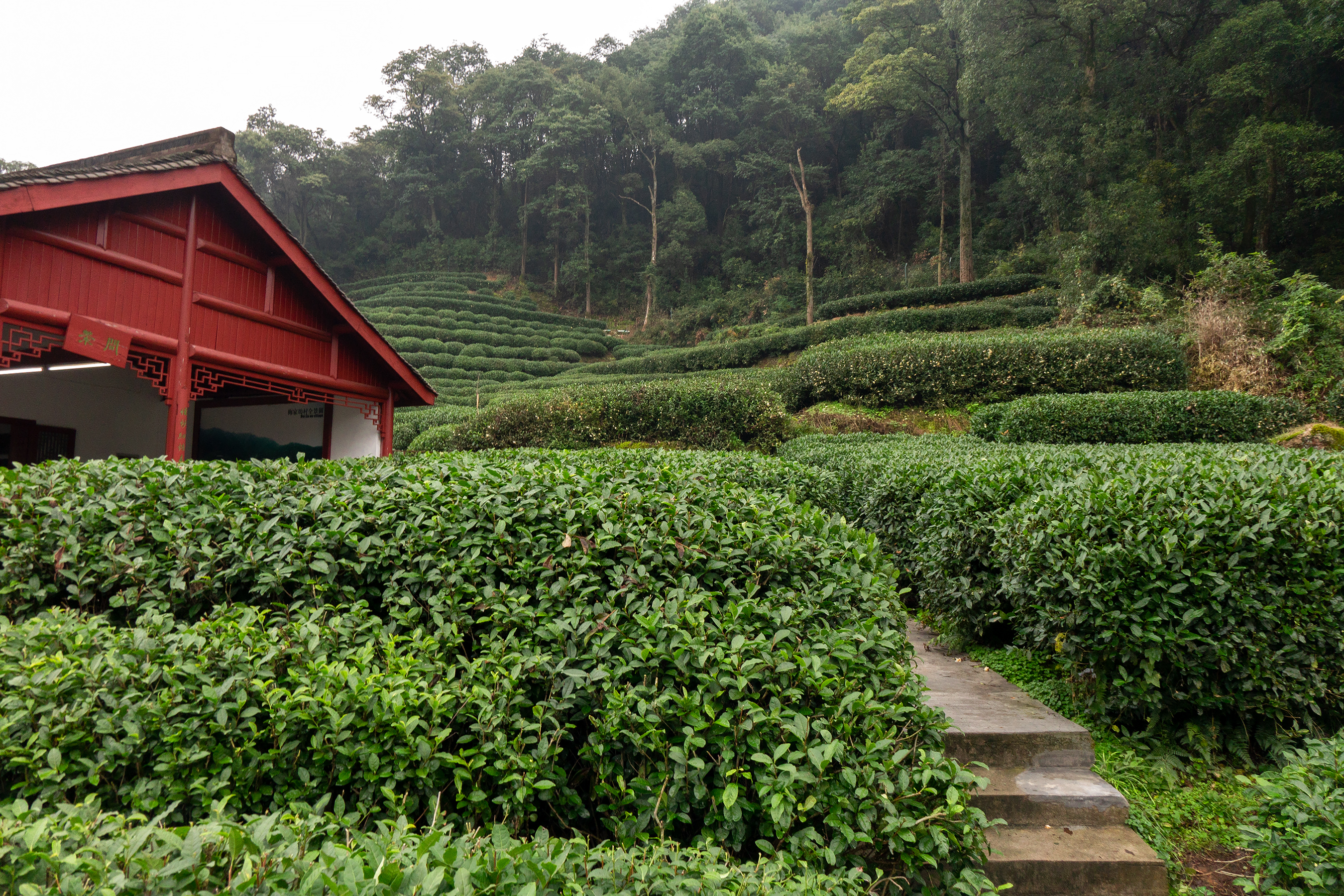
Meijiawu Village, longjing tea field at Dragon Well Tea Plantation

There are five peaks within Xihu (West Lake). Ranked by desirability, they are Lion, Dragon, Cloud, Tiger, and Plum Flower.

Meijiawu Longjing: Meijiawu is the largest Xihu Longjing tea production village that has over 2,380 mu of tea farmland and around 560 agricultural households. Annually the village produces around 50 tons of dry tea. It is surrounded by mountains of 200-500 meters high, has fresh air and very clean spring water. Meijiawu hosts tens of thousands of tourists from all over the world and China each year. The Longjing tea produced from this village is used as gifts for and favored by prominent figures. Through handmaking techniques, delicate processing procedures and being packed in elegant or simple packages, the Meijiawu Xihu Longjing tea now is more widely accessible.

Shi Feng Longjing: A type of Xihu Longjing from the Shi Feng (Lion Peak) production region. Fresh-tasting, its fragrance is sharp and long-lasting. Its leaves are yellowish-green in color. Some unscrupulous tea makers excessively pan-fire their tea to imitate its color.

Cloud Peak is a government testing ground, and the tea from there is not usually for sale on the open market.

Tiger Spring Longjing: It is named after the best water source in the Tiyun Mountains. This type of Xihu Longjing tastes wonderful even after repeated infusions.

Bai Longjing: Not a true Longjing, but looks like one and is commonly attributed to it; it is actually a Bai Pian. It comes from Anji in the Zhejiang Province. It was created in the early 80's and is a Green tea from a race of White tea trees and is hence very unusual; it is said to contain more amino acids than ordinary Green tea.

Qiantang Longjing: This tea comes from just outside the Xihu district. It is generally less expensive than Xihu Longjing.

== Flavor and quality characteristics ==
Longjing tea contains vitamin C, amino acids, and high concentrations of catechins, as is common in many Chinese green teas.

West Lake Longjing tea, produced in the West Lake area of Hangzhou, is associated with relatively high amino acid levels and lower tea polyphenol levels, characteristics linked to its local growing conditions. These qualities contribute to its fresh taste and nutritional value.

A study by Wang and Ruan (2009) found that higher chlorophyll concentrations contributed to a darker green color and lower perceived quality in Longjing tea. The study also found that free amino acids and the amino acid theanine contributed positively to perceived taste quality.

Longjing tea is divided into six grades: Superior and then grades 1 through 5. There are nearly two dozen micro-varieties in Zhejiang province alone. The Old Tree (Qunti) and No. 43 cultivars are among the most expensive, with pronounced aromas and flavors. Wuniuzao, also known as Early Longjing, is one of the earliest harvested varieties and has a comparatively light, subtle taste.

Authentic Longjing tea is generally described as sweet, mellow, and rounded. Some varieties are described as vegetal or grassy, while others have notes of roasted chestnut and butter.

== Physical characteristics and regional distinctions ==
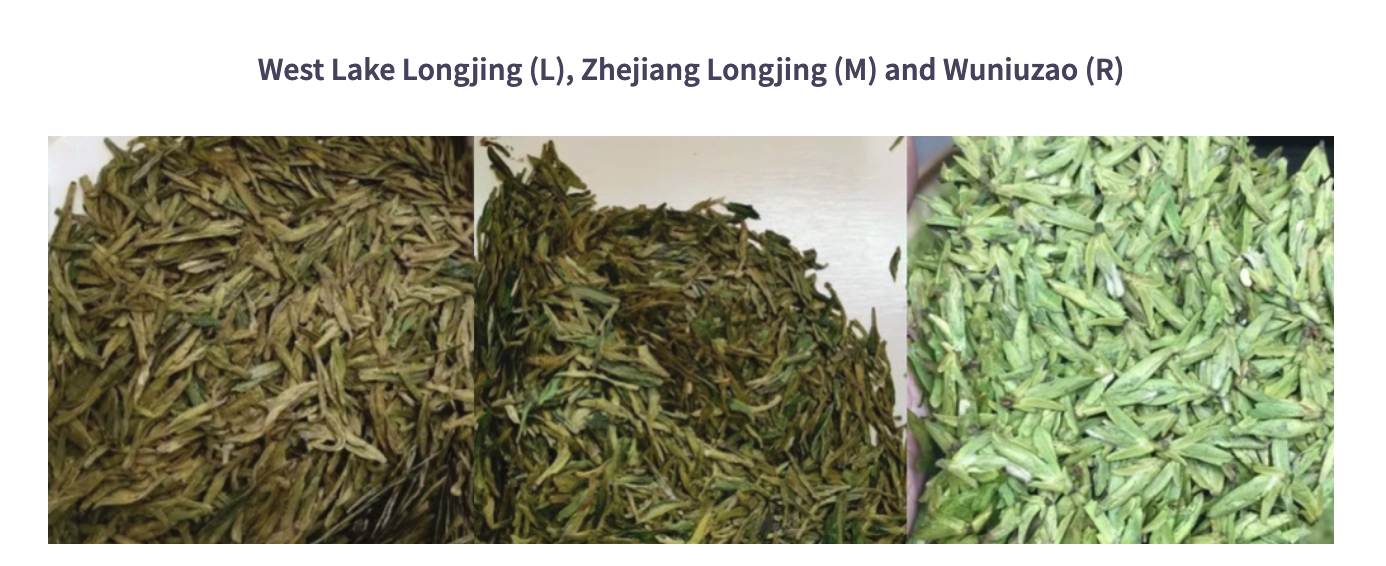
Different Longjing tea cultivars

Leaves after steeping are considered an indicator of quality, particularly the maturity and uniformity of the shoots used in processing. High-quality Longjing teas produce tender, whole leaves with a uniform appearance. Lower-quality teas may range in color from bluish green to deep green after steeping. Before infusion, high-quality Longjing teas are typically tight, flat, and light green in color.

Tea from the protected production area in Hangzhou is associated with several characteristic features, including flat, smooth leaves with a light green to yellow-green color, and the use of cultivars such as Qunti and Longjing #43. Studies comparing Longjing tea from different regions have identified differences in leaf form, firing style, and aroma between tea grown within the protected zone and tea produced elsewhere.

== Environmental requirements for growth ==
=== Water ===
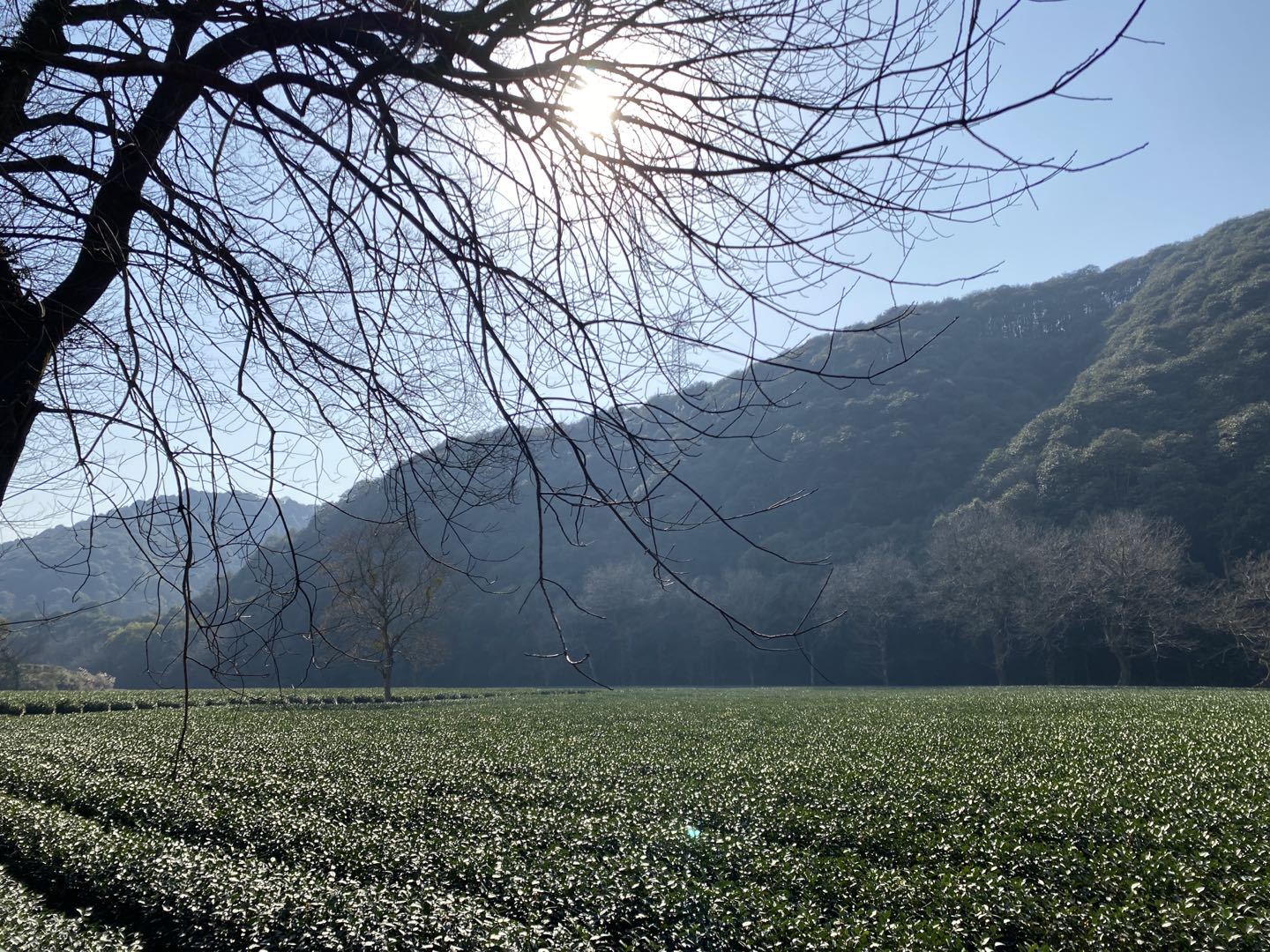
Longjing tea plantation

The overall water content of tea plants is 55%–60%, but the water content of new shoots can reach 70%–80%. In the tea-picking process, the continuous regrowth of new shoots requires a constant supply of water. Therefore, Longjing tea trees need more water than ordinary trees. It is suggested that the growth and development of tea trees are most suitable when the annual precipitation is 2000–3000 mm, the average monthly precipitation in the tea season is 200–300 mm, the atmospheric relative humidity is 80%–90%, and the soil field water holding capacity is 70%–80%.

=== Temperature ===
The annual average temperature suitable for tea trees is above 13 °C, and the monthly average temperature in the growing season of tea trees is no lower than 15 °C. The most suitable temperature range for the growth of Longjing tea is between 10 °C and 20 °C. The growth of new shoots first accelerates with increasing air temperature, but when the air temperature reaches above 35 °C, the growth of tea trees will be inhibited.

=== Light ===
Longjing tea is light-sensitive and shade-resistant. It is oxidized in direct light but is tolerant to lower light conditions. 90% ~ 95% of the dry matter in tea plant organisms is synthesized by photosynthesis, which can only be carried out under sunlight. The branches with poor light conditions develop weakly. The fully illuminated leaf cells are closely arranged; the epidermal cells are thicker; the leaves are thicker and firmer; the leaf color is relatively dark and glossy; and the quality components are rich.

=== Geographic suitability ===
Jiabin Wang is a tea research expert in the Zhejiang Provincial Department of Agriculture. After years of research, he found that the temperature, light, relative humidity, rainfall, and other conditions in the 28°~32° N region are highly suitable for the growth of Longjing tea trees, making it the most suitable area for tea cultivation. The southwest of the West Lake area is located in the middle of the latitude, 30°04′~30°20′ N.

=== Regional climate and terroir ===
In Hangzhou, the solar radiation is weak, the rainfall is higher, and the temperature is lower. Especially areas around the West Lake in Hangzhou are known for a mild, temperate, and often rainy climate, creating the perfect climate to maximize flavor. West Lake Longjing Tea is grown in the area around West Lake, near the Qiantang River, where high humidity and relatively low solar radiation create ideal conditions for growing Longjing tea.

== Production process ==
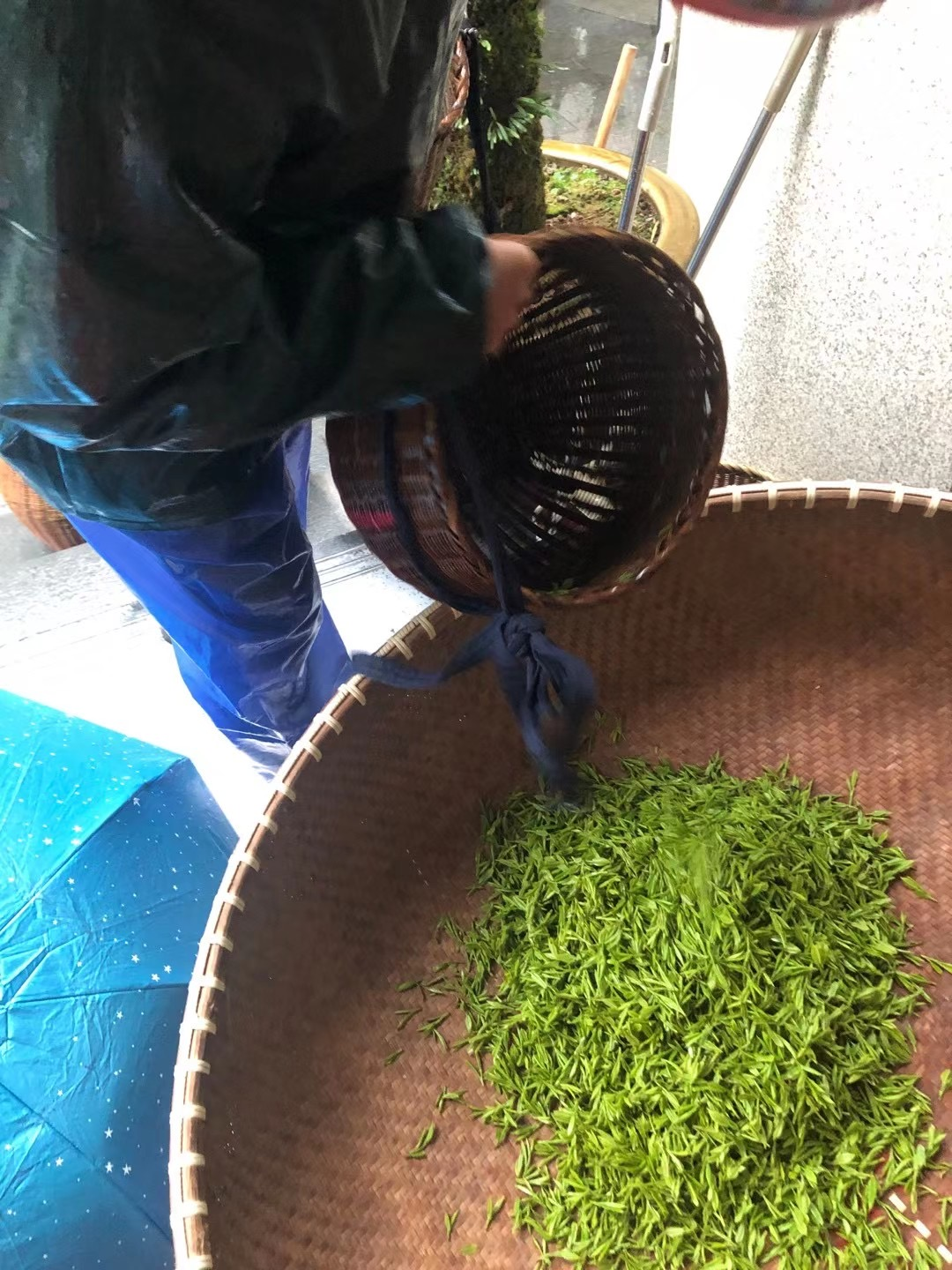
Freshly-picked tea leaves laid out to dry

Like most other Chinese green tea, Longjing tea leaves are roasted early in processing (after picking) to stop the natural oxidation process, which is a part of creating black and oolong teas. The actions of these enzymes are stopped by "firing" (heating in pans) or by steaming the leaves before they dry out completely. As with other green teas (and white teas), Longjing tea leaves undergo minimal oxidation. When steeped, the tea produces a yellow-green color.

=== Pick Times ===
West Lake Longjing tea picking has three characteristics: early, tender, and diligent.

In the picking season (the best picking period of West Lake Longjing tea is from late March to April, and the climate before and after the picking period has a vital impact on the quality of tea, including nutrition, tea polyphenols and amino acid content), the local temperature is basically between 10 °C and 20 °C, which makes the tea buds of West Lake Longjing tea picked at this time smaller and higher in quality.

==== Pre-Qingming Longjing ====
The premium early season first-picking known as Ming Qian or Pre-Qingming (or Before Ching Ming) Longjing tea requires it to be produced from the first spring shoots before the Qingming Festival on the 5th of April each year (approximately). According to the Chinese farming calendar, which is a national holiday between April 1 and 4, it rains. After the rain, the temperature heats up, causing the tea plant to grow faster. When the tea bud becomes too big, it begins to lose complexity in the brewed flavor; the pre-qingming tea is considered best.

==== Guyu (Grain Rain) ====
The tea picked before the arrival of Grain Rain in mid-April is also quite good, which is called Yuqian Tea.

=== Drying after picking ===
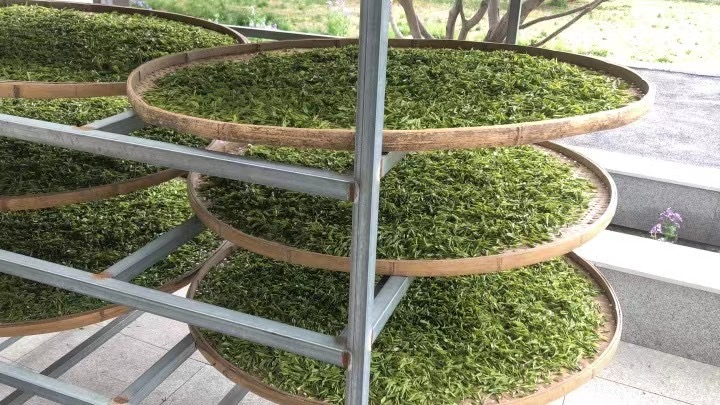
Tea drying on bamboo screens

Longjing tea needs about half a day for drying on a bamboo sieve after picking and spread to a thickness of about 2 cm (0.8 in).

This can reduce the taste of grass in tea leaves, make the moisture meet the requirements of frying, enhance the aroma of tea, reduce the bitterness and astringency, increase the amino acid content, improve the freshness, and prevent the new tea from clumping during frying.

=== Frying ===
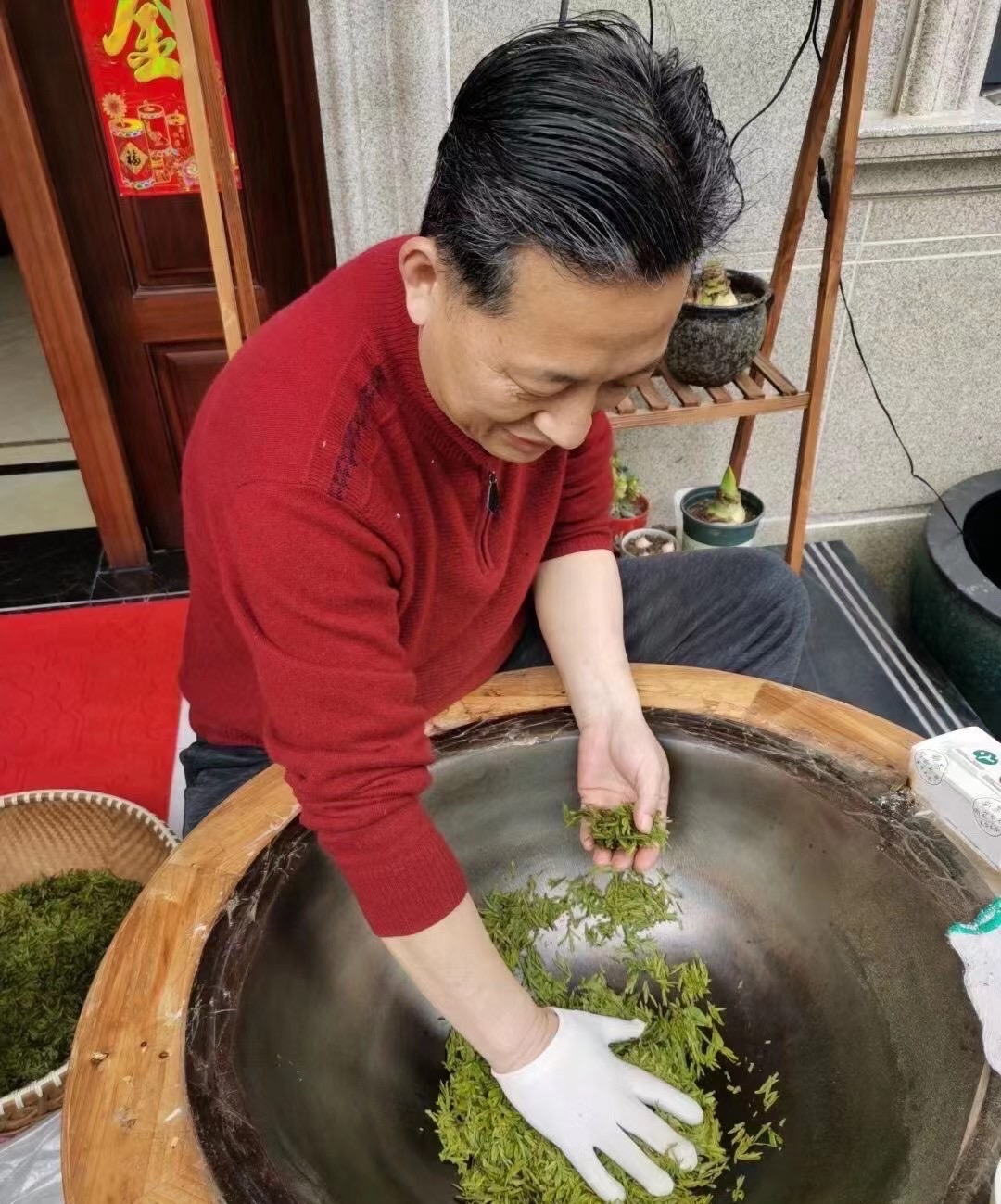
Longjing tea roasting process

Water-removing (杀青), also known as Green pot (绿锅), is the process of removing moisture and preliminary shaping. When the pot reaches 80-100°C, workers add about 100 grams of spread leaves and fry them by hand. It always starts with grasping and shaking. After losing a certain amount of water from the tea leaves, the workers gradually switch to pressing, shaking, and throwing for preliminary molding. The pressure is changed from light to heavy, achieving the purpose of straightening into strips and flattening molding. When the tea leaves are parched to 70%-80%, the workers stop frying immediately. The whole process lasts for 12–15 minutes.

== Legends ==
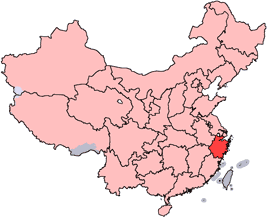
Longjing tea is grown in Zhejiang province, China.

Longjing tea was granted the status of Gong Cha, or imperial tea, in the Qing dynasty by the Kangxi Emperor. According to the legend, the Kangxi Emperor's grandson, the Qianlong Emperor, visited West Lake during one of his famous holidays.

He went to the Hu Gong Temple under the Lion Peak Mountain (Shi Feng Shan) and was presented with a cup of Longjing tea in front of the Hu Gong Temple were 18 tea bushes. Impressed by the quality of the tea, he conferred special imperial status on these 18 tea bushes. The trees are still living, and the tea they produce is auctioned annually for a higher price per gram than gold. There is another legend connecting the Qianlong Emperor to Longjing tea. It is said that while visiting the temple, he was watching the ladies picking the tea. He was so enamored with their movements that he decided to try it himself. While picking tea, he received a message that his mother, Empress Dowager Chongqing, was ill and wished his immediate return to Beijing. He shoved the leaves he had picked into his sleeve and immediately left for Beijing. Upon his return, he immediately visited his mother. She noticed the scent of leaves on his sleeves, and he immediately had it brewed for her. It is said that the shape of Longjing Tea was designed to mimic the flattened leaves the emperor brewed for his mother.

Longjing, which literally translates as "dragon well", is said to have been named after a well that contains relatively dense water. After rain, the lighter rainwater floating on the surface sometimes exhibits a sinuous, twisting boundary with the well water, which is said to resemble the movement of a Chinese dragon.

Legend also has it that to achieve the best taste from Longjing, water from the Dreaming of the Tiger Spring, a famous spring in Hangzhou, is to be used. The water quality of the spring now is certainly very different from before. The tea takes its name from the eponymous "Dragon Well" located near Longjing village.

== Authentic Longjing ==
=== Commercial production and adulteration ===
A large majority of Longjing tea on the market, however, is actually not from Hangzhou. Many of these inauthentic longjing teas are produced in provinces such as Yunnan, Guizhou, Sichuan, and Guangdong. However, credible sellers may sometimes provide anti-fake labels or openly state that the tea is not from Zhejiang. Some tea makers take fresh tea leaves produced in the Yunnan, Guizhou, and Sichuan provinces and process them using Longjing tea techniques, while some merchants mix a small amount of high-grade tea with low-grade tea and sell it as expensive high-grade tea.

== Protection ==
龙井茶; 龍井茶; Longjing cha is protected in the European Union and the UK as a Protected Designation of Origin since 1998.

=== Protected designation and regulation ===
Authentication of Longjing tea is shaped by government rules and by features linked with tea from the traditional growing area. Chinese authorities designate protected zones in Hangzhou, and only tea grown within the 168-square-kilometer region may be labeled "West Lake Longjing." This rule is a main factor in separating authentic Longjing from tea produced outside the area.

=== Certification and labeling ===
To manage certified production and confirm origin, the government created official labels, including the "single-farmer tea" label and the "double-label management system". These labels connect tea to approved growers and limit what can enter the market under the Longjing name.

== See also ==
- List of Chinese teas
