= Jin Suo Chi tea =

Chinese oolong tea

Jin Suo Chi
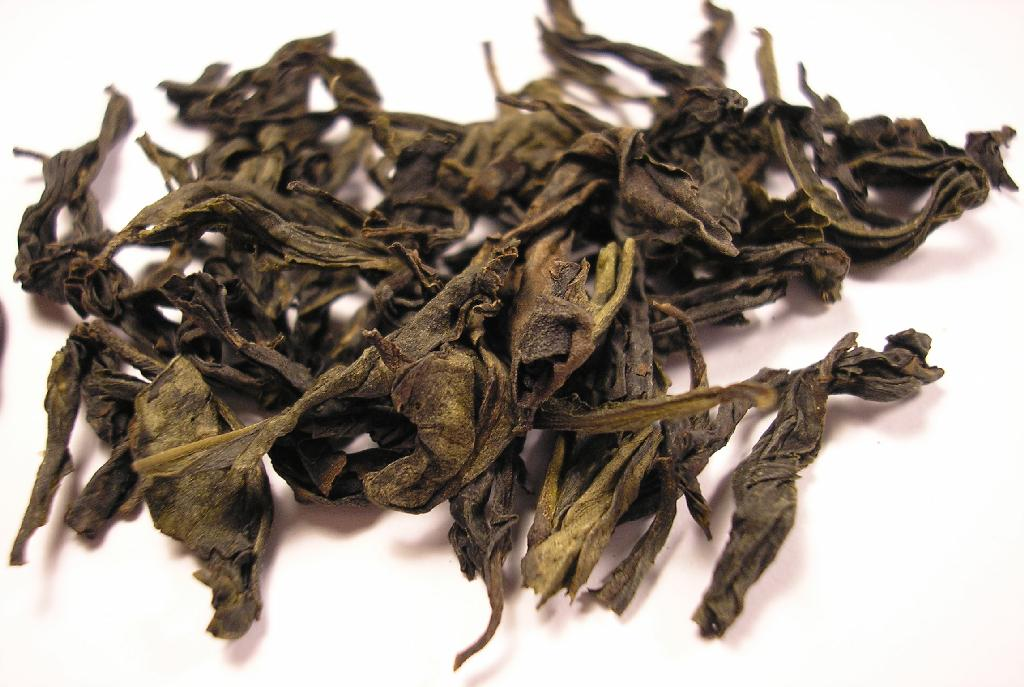
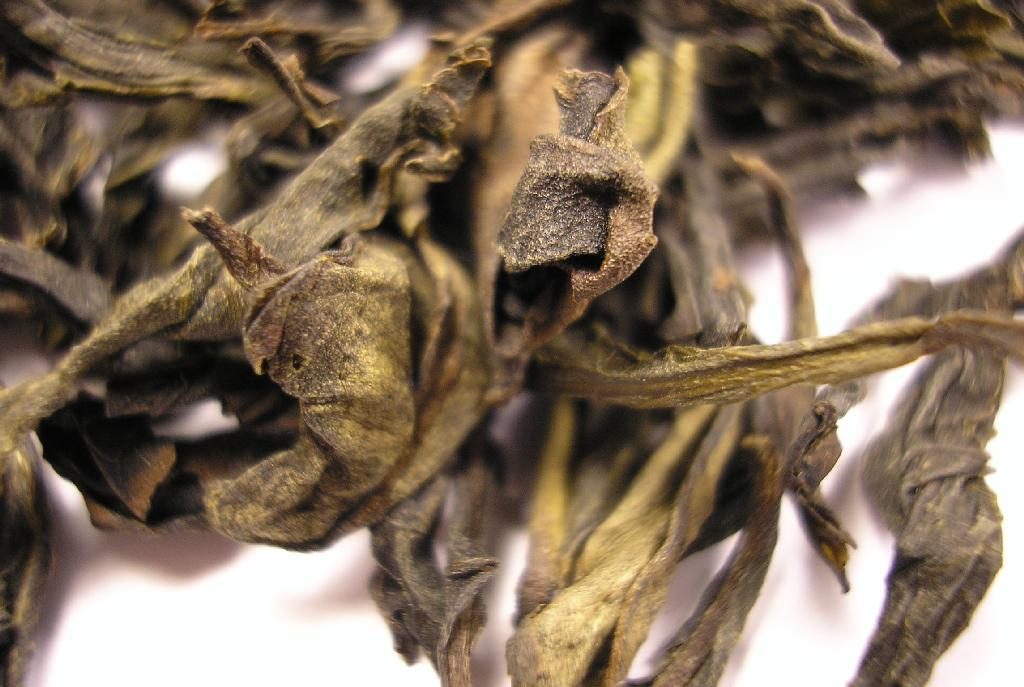
- Type: Oolong
- Other names: Golden Key, 金鎖匙
- Origin: Mount Wuyi, Fujian Province, China
- Quick description: A rarely seen Mount Wuyi Oolong with a light taste

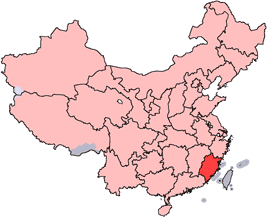
Jin Suo Chi tea is grown in Fujian province, China.

Jin Suo Chi (simplified Chinese: 金锁匙; traditional Chinese: 金鎖匙; pinyin: jīn suǒ chí; lit. 'Golden Key'; pronounced [tɕín swò ʈʂʰɻ̩̌]) is a very rare Wuyi Oolong with a light taste.
