= Tea in the United Kingdom =

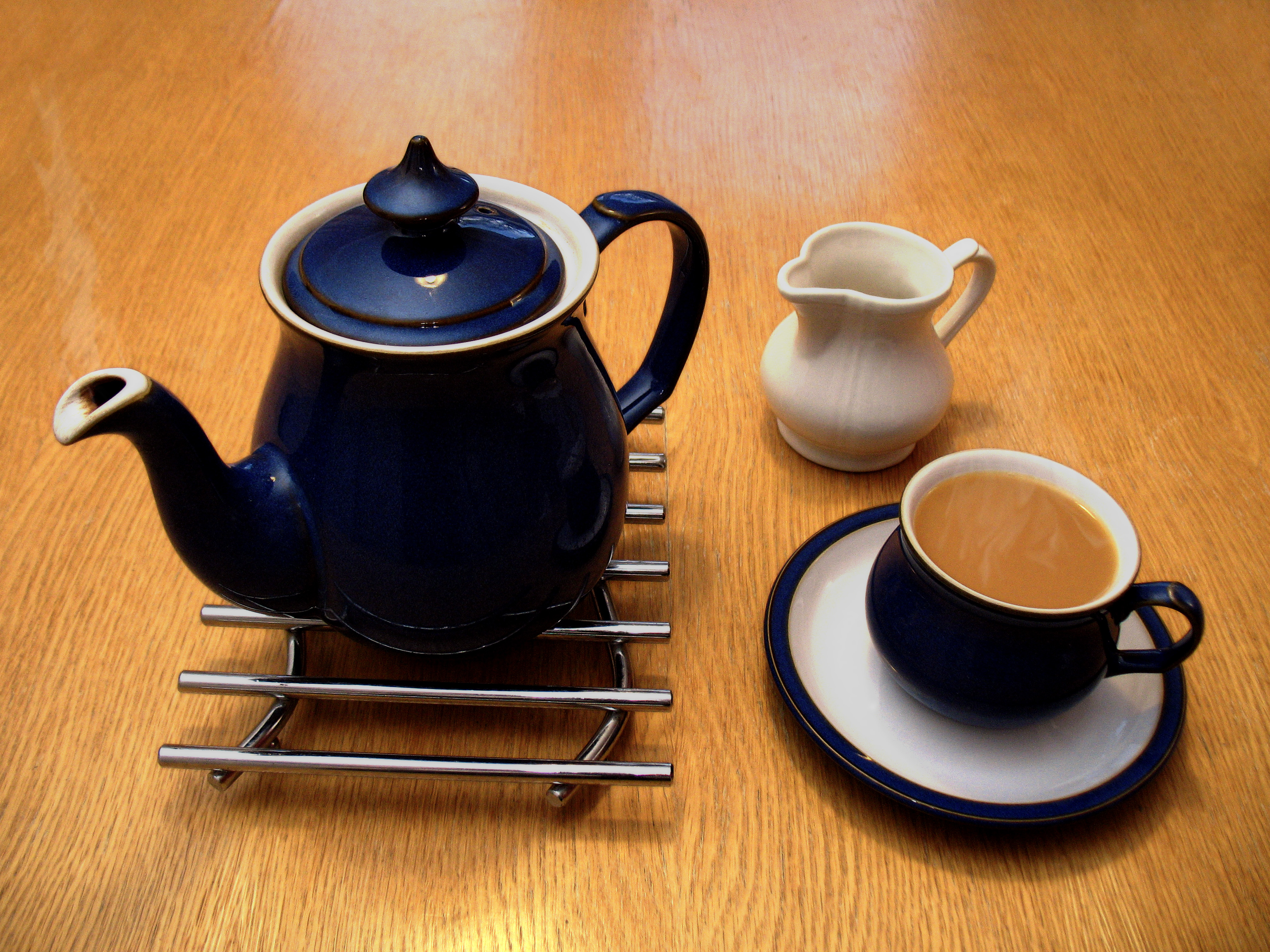
A ceramic teapot on a metal trivet, a milk jug, and a full teacup on a saucer

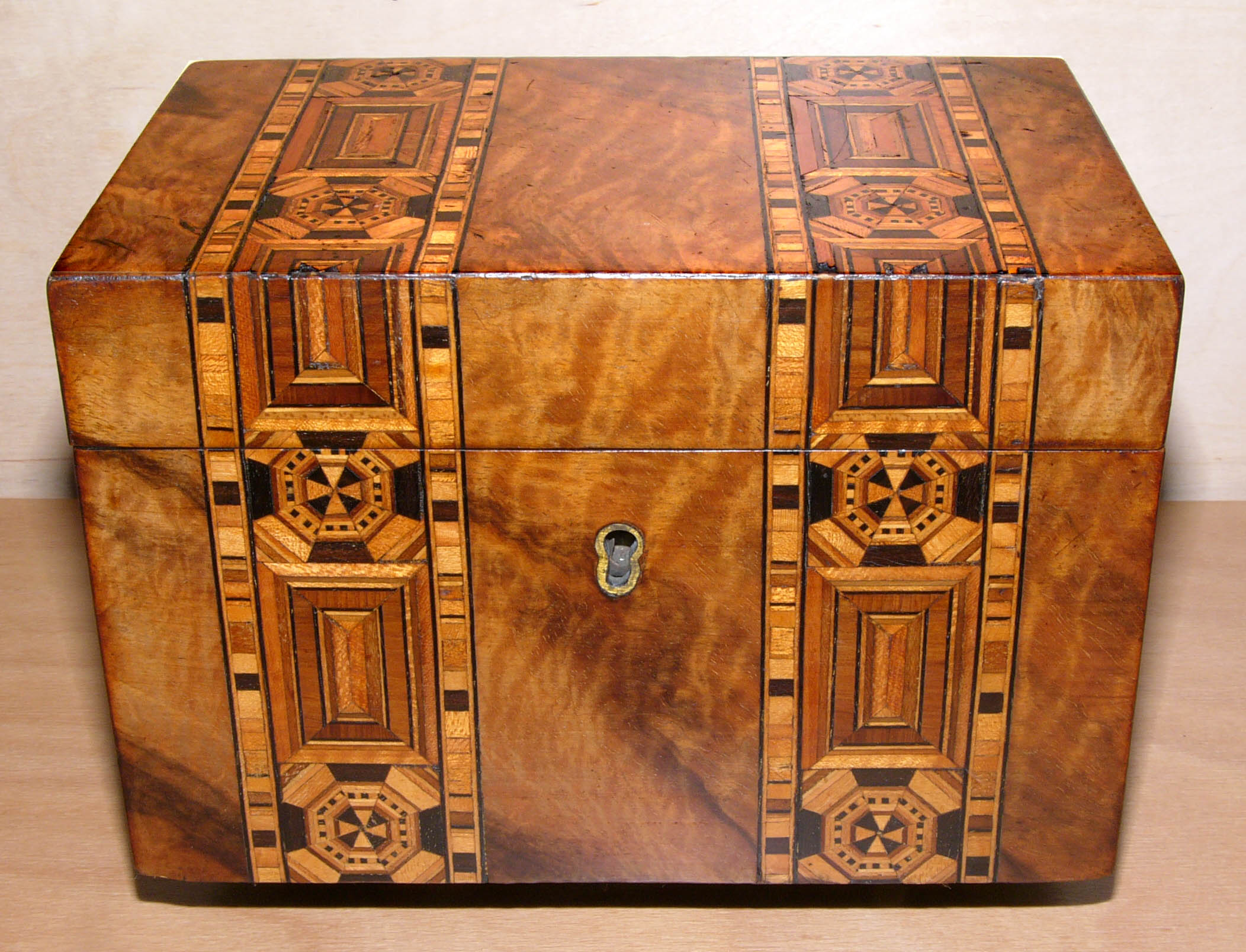
An English tea caddy, a box used to store loose tea leaves

Since the 17th century, the United Kingdom has been one of the world's largest consumers of tea, with an average annual per capita consumption of 1.9 kilograms (4.2 lb). Originally an upper-class drink in Europe, tea gradually became common through all classes. It is considered an important part of the British identity and is a prominent feature of British culture and society. Tea remained more popular than coffee in Britain until around 2016 according to The Economist.

In Northern Ireland and in the rest of the United Kingdom tea drinking blends and preferences vary. Although typically served with milk, it is also common to drink certain varieties black or with lemon. Sugar is a popular addition to any variety. Everyday tea, such as English breakfast tea, served in a mug with milk and sugar is a popular combination. Sandwiches, crumpets, scones, cake, or biscuits often accompany tea; afternoon tea is a meal in which sandwiches, bread and butter, cakes and biscuits are typically served.

== History ==
The rise in popularity of tea between the 17th and 19th centuries had major social, political, and economic implications for the Kingdom of Great Britain. Tea defined respectability and domestic rituals, supported the rise of the British Empire, and contributed to the rise of the Industrial Revolution by supplying both the capital for factories and calories for labourers. It also demonstrated the power of globalisation and its ability to transform a country and reshape its society.

=== Historiography ===
William H. Ukers argues in All About Tea: Volume I that tea gained popularity in Great Britain due to its reputation as a medicinal drink and its burgeoning presence in coffeehouses where elite men congregated. As for the popularity of tea among women, he briefly acknowledges that Princess Catherine of Braganza, the future queen consort of England, made tea fashionable amongst aristocratic women, but largely attributes its popularity to its ubiquity in the medical discourse of the 17th century. In Empire of Tea: The Asian Leaf that Conquered the World the authors Markman Ellis, Richard Coulton and Matthew Mauger trace tea's popularity back to three distinct groups: virtuosi, merchants, and elite female aristocrats. They argue that the influence of these three groups combined launched tea as a popular beverage in Britain.

Woodruff D. Smith in his article "Complications of the Commonplace: Tea, Sugar, and Imperialism" differs from the beliefs of the previous writers. He argues that tea only became popular once sugar was added to the drink and that the combination became associated with a domestic ritual that indicated respectability. Sidney W. Mintz in both "The Changing Roles of Food in the Story of Consumption" and Sweetness and Power agrees to an extent with Smith, acknowledging that sugar played a monumental role in the rise of tea, but he contradicts Smith's connection of tea to respectability. While Smith argues that tea first became popular in the home, Mintz claims that tea was drunk during the workday for its warm sweetness and stimulating properties, elaborating that it was later that tea entered the home and became an "integral part of the social fabric".

=== 17th century and earlier ===
==== Early mentions ====
The history of European interactions with tea dates back to the mid-16th century. The earliest mention of tea in Western literature was by Giambattista Ramusio, a Venetian explorer, as Chai Catai, or "Tea of China", in 1559. Tea was mentioned several more times in various European countries afterwards, but Jan Hugo van Linschooten, a Dutch navigator, was the first to write a printed reference of tea in English in 1598 in his Voyages and Travels.

However, it was several years later, in 1615, that the earliest known reference to tea by an Englishman took place. In a letter, Mr. R. Wickham, an agent for the East India Company stationed at Japan, asked a Mr. Eaton, who was stationed in then-Portuguese Macao, China, to send him "a pot of the best sort of chaw", phonetically an approximation of "chàh", the local Cantonese dialect word for tea. Another early reference to tea appears in the writings of the cleric Samuel Purchas in 1625. Purchas described how the Chinese consumed tea as "the powder of a certaine herbe called chia of which they put as much as a walnut shell may contain, into a dish of Porcelane, and drink it with hot water". In 1637 Peter Mundy, a British traveller and merchant who came across tea in Fujian, China, wrote, "chaa – only water with a kind of herb boyled in it".

==== Sale of tea begins ====
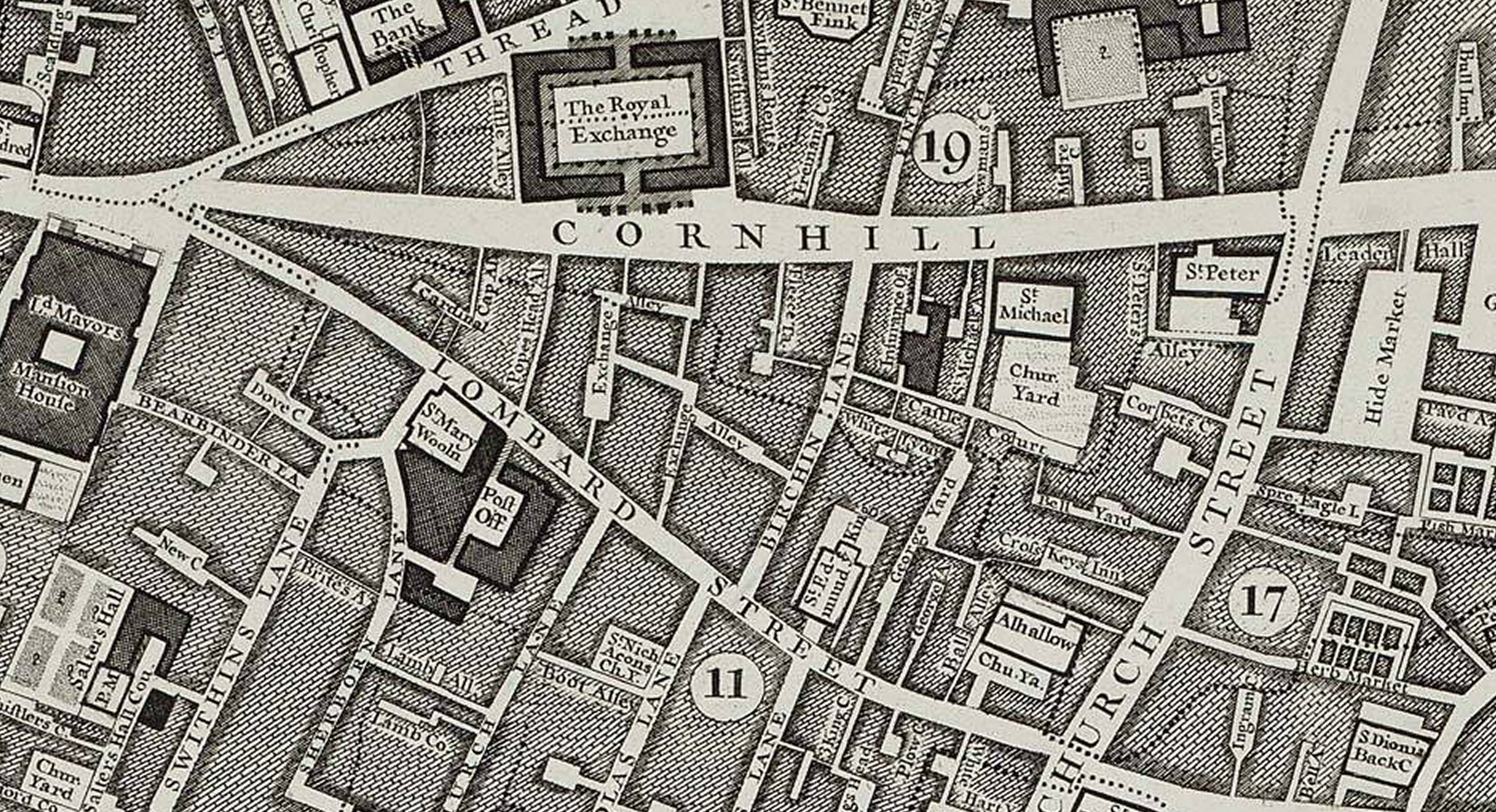
1746 map showing Exchange Alley, where tea was first sold in England

Though there were a number of early mentions, it was several more years before tea was actually sold in England. Green tea exported from China was first introduced in the coffeehouses of London shortly before the 1660 Stuart Restoration.

Thomas Garway, a tobacconist and coffeehouse-owner, was the first person in England to sell tea as a leaf and beverage at his London coffeehouse in Exchange Alley in 1657. He had to explain the new beverage in a pamphlet. The Sultaness Head Coffee House began selling tea as a beverage and posted the first newspaper advertisement for tea in Mercurius Politicus on 30 September 1658. The announcement proclaimed, "That Excellent, and by all Physicians approved, China drink, called by the Chinese, Tcha, by other nations Tay alias Tee, ...sold at the Sultaness-head, ye Cophee-house in Sweetings-Rents, by the Royal Exchange, London".

In London "[c]offee, chocolate and a kind of drink called tee" were "sold in almost every street in 1659", according to Thomas Rugge's Diurnall. However, tea was still mainly consumed by upper and mercantile classes. The writer and politician Samuel Pepys, curious for every novelty, tasted the new drink on 25 September 1660 and recorded the experience in his diary, writing, "I did send for a cup of tee, (a China drink) of which I had never had drunk before".

The East India Company made its first order for the importation of tea in 1667 to their agent in Bantam, who then sent two canisters of tea weighing 143 pounds (2,290 oz) in 1669. In 1672 a servant of Edward Herbert, 3rd Baron Herbert of Chirbury in London sent his instructions for tea-making, and warming the delicate cups, to Shropshire:

The directions for the tea are: a quart of spring water just boiled, to which put a spoonful of tea, and sweeten to the palate with candy sugar. As soon as the tea and sugar are in, the steam must be kept in as much as may be, and let it lie half or quarter of an hour in the heat of the fire but not boil. The little cups must be held over the steam before the liquid be put in.

The earliest English equipages for making tea date to the 1660s. Small porcelain tea bowls were used by the fashionable and were occasionally shipped with the tea itself.

==== Tea as a medicinal drink ====
The first factor that contributed to the rise in popularity of tea was its reputation as a medicinal drink. Tea first became labelled as a medical drink in 1641 by the Dutch physician and director of the Dutch East India Company Nikolas Dirx, who wrote under the pseudonym Nicolaes Tulp; in his book Observationes Medicae, he claimed that "nothing is comparable to this plant" and that those who use it are "exempt from all maladies and reach an extreme old age". Dirx went into considerable detail on the specific merits of tea, such as curing "headaches, colds, ophthalmia, catarrh, asthma, sluggishness of the stomach, and intestinal troubles". A shopkeeper named Thomas Garway praised the medical benefits of tea in a broadsheet published in 1660 titled, "An Exact Description of the Growth, Quality, and Vertues of the Leaf TEA". Garway claims that "the Drink is declared to be most wholesome, preserving in perfect health until extreme Old Age", as well as "maketh the body active and lusty", "helpeth the Headache", "taketh away the difficulty of breathing", "strengtheneth the Memory", and "expelleth infection".

There were many more published works on the health benefits of tea, including those by the polymath Samuel Hartlib in 1657, the physician Cornelis Bontekoe in 1678, the merchant and politician Thomas Povey in 1686 and the merchant and writer Thomas Tryon in the 1690s; one satirist of the time asked whether the Royal College of Physicians could debate whether any of the exotic new hot drinks would "agree with the Constitutions of our English bodies". In 1667 Pepys noted that his wife was taking tea on medical advice – "a drink which Mr Pelling the Pottecary tells her is good for her colds and defluxions". The English philosopher John Locke developed a fondness for tea after spending time with Dutch medical men in the 1680s. These men are the "virtuosi" referred to by Ellis, Coulton and Mauger: scientists, philosophers, and doctors who first took an interest in tea and contributed to its early popularity as a pharmaceutical. However, as with Dirx, some of these men may have been influenced by the Indies trading companies and merchants who wished to create a market for tea. Nevertheless, these writings about the perceived health benefits of tea contributed to the rise of the drink's popularity in England.

A study in 2022 found that rising tea-consumption during the 18th century in England had the unintended effect of reducing mortality rates, as it led more people to boil their water, thus reducing their vulnerability to waterborne diseases.

==== Popularity among aristocrats ====
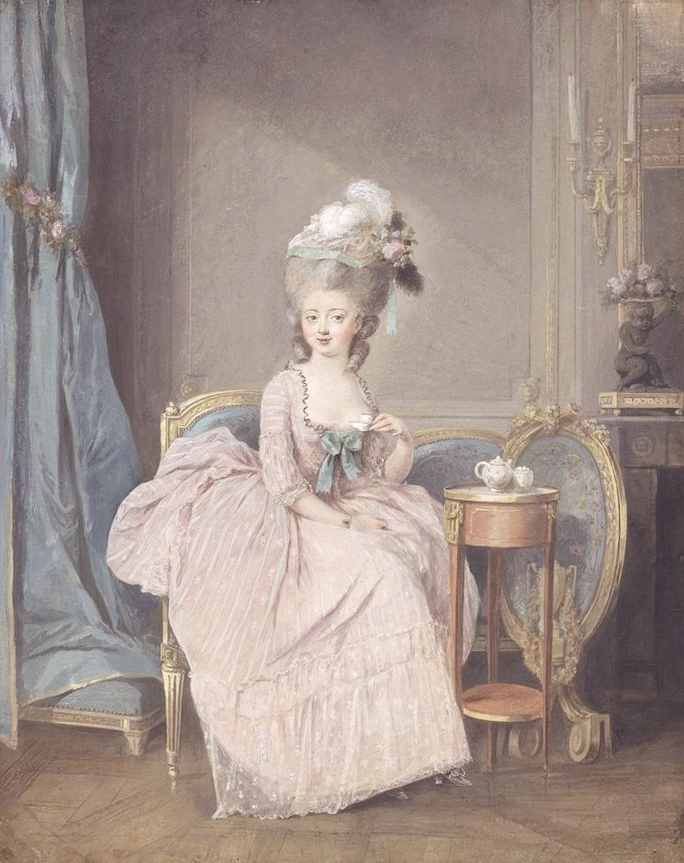
Lady drinking tea by Niclas Lafrensen

According to Ellis, Coulton and Mauger, "tea was six to ten times more expensive than coffee" in the 1660s, making it a costly and luxurious commodity. The proliferation of works on the health benefits of tea came at a time when people in the upper classes of English society began to take an interest in their health, further bolstering its popularity.

In 1660, 2 pounds (0.91 kg) and 2 ounces (57 g) of tea bought from Portugal were formally presented to Charles II of England by the East India Company. The drink, already common in Europe, was a favourite of his new Portuguese bride, Catherine of Braganza. She introduced it at Domus Dei in Portsmouth during her wedding to Charles II in 1662 and made it fashionable among the ladies of the court as her temperance drink of choice. Catherine of Braganza's use of tea as a court beverage rather than a medicinal drink influenced its popularity in literary circles around 1685. Whenever it was consumed in the court, it was "conspicuously on display" so as to show it off.

Accordingly, tea drinking became a central aspect of aristocratic society in England by the 1680s, particularly among women who drank it while visiting in the home. Catherine of Braganza's tea-drinking habit made tea an acceptable drink for both gentlemen and ladies. Wealthy ladies' desire to show off their luxurious commodities in front of other ladies also increased demand for tea and made it more popular. The addition of sugar was yet another factor that made tea desirable among the elite crowd, as it was another luxurious commodity already well-established among the upper classes.

=== 18th century ===
==== Continuing sale of tea ====
While tea slowly became more common in coffeehouses during the second half of the 17th century, the first tea shop in London did not open until the early-18th century. Thomas Twining's tea shop has been claimed as the first, opening in 1706 at 216 Strand, London, where it remains; however, 1717 has also been given as the date for the first tea shop. In between tea's earliest mentions in Britain and its widespread popularity just over a century later, many factors contributed to the craze for this previously unknown foreign commodity.

Tea would not have become a British staple if not for the increase in its supply that made it more accessible. Between 1720 and 1750, the imports of tea to Britain through the East India Company more than quadrupled. By 1766, exports from Canton stood at 6,000,000 pounds (2,700,000 kg) on British boats, compared with 4.5 on Dutch ships, 2.4 on Swedish, 2.1 on French. Veritable "tea fleets" grew up. Tea was particularly interesting to the Atlantic World, not only for its ease of cultivation but also its ease of preparation and its reputed medical benefits. Whatever its supposed benefits, Francisca A. Antman has argued that the expansion of tea-drinking in 18th-century Britain meant that people were consuming more boiled water, which was less likely to carry pathogens, and that this explains a previously puzzling fall in mortality from the mid-18th to the mid-19th centuries.

When tea was first introduced to Britain, the East India Company was not directly trading with China, and merchants relied on tea imports from Holland. Because this tea was so expensive and difficult to get, there was very little demand for it, except among the elite who could afford it and made special orders. It was not until after 1700 that the East India Company began to trade regularly with China and ordered tea for export, though not in large quantities. Smith argues that the tea trade was actually a side effect of the silk and textile trade, the most desired Chinese commodities of the time. In 1720, however, Parliament banned the importation of finished Asian textiles, and traders began to focus on tea instead. This new focus marked a turning point for the British tea trade and is arguably why tea became more popular than coffee. Once the East India company focused on tea as its main import, tea soon attained price stability. Conversely, the price of coffee remained unpredictable and high, allowing tea to grow in popularity before coffee became more accessible. Furthermore, the rising demand for tea and sugar was easily met with increased supply as the tea industry grew in India, which prevented sharp price increases that would have discouraged people from buying it.

Because of the use of tea bowls, tea-drinking spurred the search for a European imitation of Chinese porcelain, which was first successfully produced in Britain at the Chelsea porcelain manufactory, established around 1743–1745 and quickly imitated.

By the 1770s, all tea from foreign countries would first be imported and bought by London wholesalers or merchants before being exported by them. However, the taxes of importing tea to Britain were very high, resulting in tea being smuggled into Europe in significant quantities, forming an important aspect of the tea trade. Historians found that, regarding the British tea trade before 1784, the estimated quantity of tea smuggled was roughly 7,500,000 pounds (3,400,000 kg) per year, although some believe the amount to be between 4,000,000–6,000,000 pounds (1,800,000–2,700,000 kg). Faced with such levels of smuggling and unearned tax revenues, the British Parliament enacted the Commutation Act in 1784, slashing tea taxes from 119 percent to 12.5 percent, which effectively ended smuggling practices. The resulting reduction in tea prices allowed a larger population to purchase it, thereby spreading its use across social classes.

In the late 1770s, the owner of the Charleston Tea Plantation exported Chinese tea plants to his farm in Charleston, South Carolina, with the intention of producing a number of varieties of tea, including green tea, black tea and oolong tea, a successful strategy resulting in significant sales to the British population.

==== Introduction of milk and sugar ====
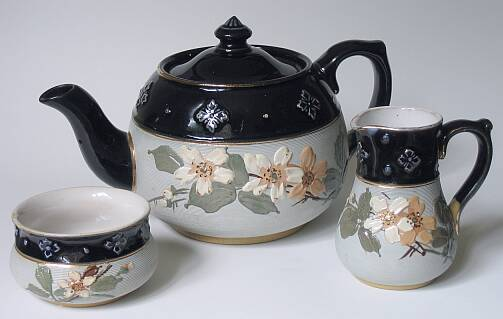
A modern British tea set, in which a sugar bowl and a milk jug accompany the teapot

Though tea was gaining popularity on its own at the beginning of the 18th century, the addition of sugar to the drink aided its rise in popularity further, as the British began adding sugar to their tea between 1685 and the early 18th century. At this time, sugar was already used to enhance the flavour of other foods among the upper classes and had a reputation as an ostentatious luxury. Because both tea and sugar had status implications, it made sense to drink them together, and the growth in the import of tea parallels that of sugar in the 18th century, which itself was booming due to the growth of sugar plantations in the Americas.

However, the upper classes of Britain began to care more about their health, and starting in the late 17th century, literature on the unhealthiness of sugar began to circulate. Adding sugar to tea, however, was seen as an acceptable way to consume sugar, as it suggested that "one had the self-control to consume sugar in a healthy way." Sugar also masked the bitterness of tea, and made it more desirable to drink; as the supply of both tea and sugar grew during the early 18th century, the combination of the two became more universal, and increased popularity and demand for both products. Black tea overtook green tea in popularity in the 1720s when it became more common for both sugar and milk to be added to tea, a practice originating outside of China.

==== Popularity among the middle classes ====
When the popular English patriotic ballad "The Roast Beef of Old England" was written in 1731, it portrayed tea (as well as coffee) as foreign and un-English, noting that they were rare during the time of Elizabeth I.

Because tea began in Britain as a luxury for the upper classes, it had a reputation in the 18th century as a high-class commodity; however, as prices slowly fell, more people at the middle levels of society had access to it. Accordingly, drinking tea became associated with respectability among upwardly mobile middle-class people. When people drank tea, they were expected to possess certain manners and behave in a particular way. Soon, drinking tea became a domestic ritual among families, colleagues, and friends who were just wealthy enough to afford it, which also increased demand. The association between tea and respectability became so ingrained in both British and Irish culture that it reached a point where it could not go out of fashion. Tea drinking among these groups was also soon considered patriotic.

Because the East India Company had a monopoly over the tea industry in Britain, tea became more popular than coffee, chocolate, and alcohol. Tea was seen as inherently British, and its consumption was encouraged by the British government because of the revenue gained from taxing tea. Unlike coffee and chocolate, which came from the colonies of Britain's rivals in various regions of the world, tea was produced in a single massive colony and served as a means of profit and colonial power. Mintz goes so far as to argue that the combination of ritualization and increased production in the British colonies was how tea became inherently British.

As the British continued to import more and more tea throughout the 18th century, tea slowly went from a respectable commodity consumed by the well-mannered classes in domestic rituals to an absolute necessity in the British diet, even among the poor working classes. John Hanway, an 18th-century social reformer, observed the widespread consumption of tea by the poor in 1767. He described "a certain lane ... where beggars are often seen ... drinking their tea", as well as "labourers mending their roads drinking their tea" and tea "in the cups of haymakers". Just two centuries after the first appearance of tea in British society as a beverage for aristocrats, tea had become so widely popular and available that those at the absolute bottom of the social hierarchy were consuming it as their beverage of choice. It was at this point that tea became universal among all levels of society. Fernand Braudel asked, "is it true to say the new drink replaced gin in England?"

=== 19th century ===
==== Adoption by the working classes ====
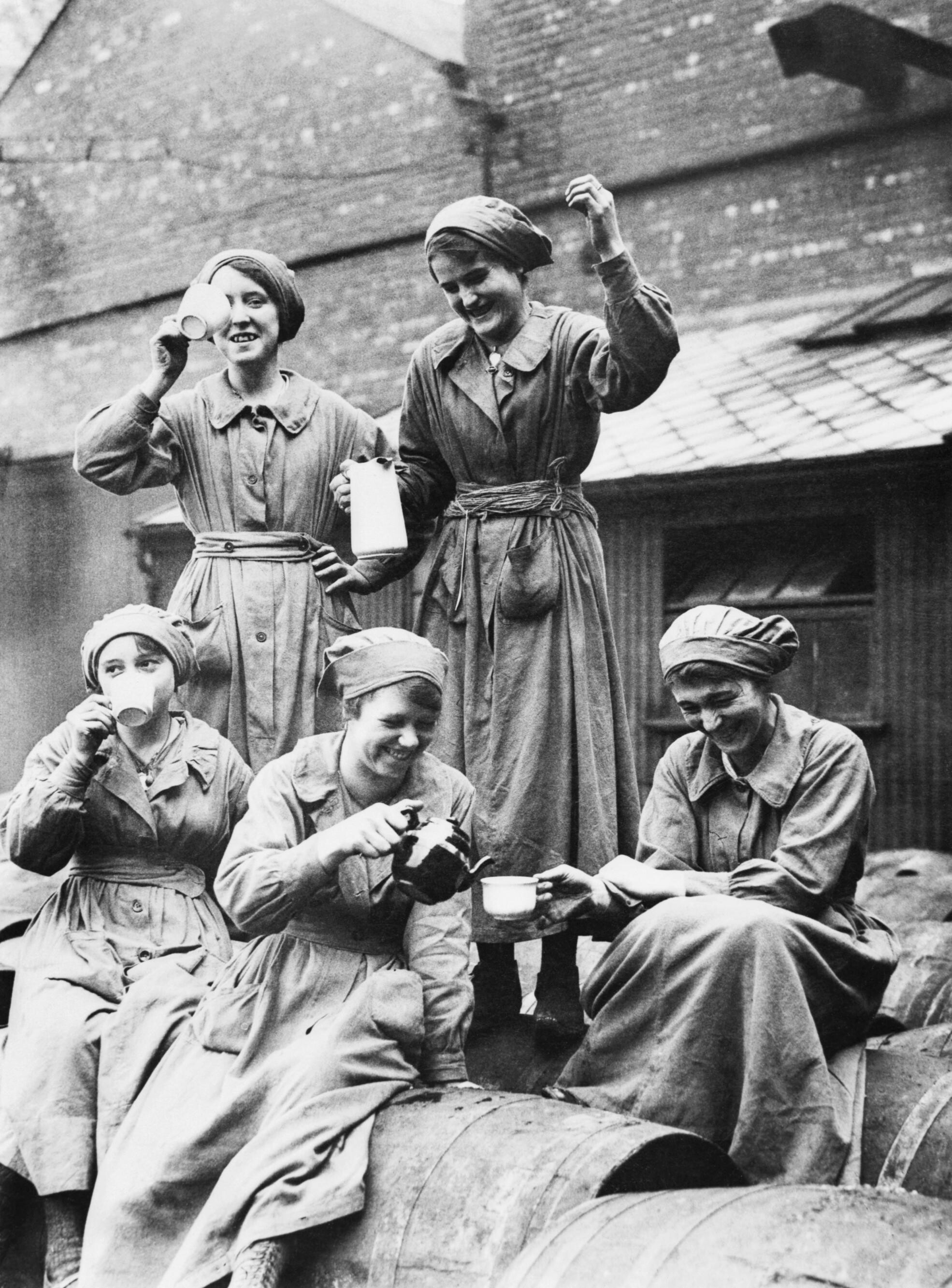
Workers taking a tea break during World War I

By the 19th century, tea had reached the working class, and it was soon considered an everyday necessity among poor labourers. According to the Scottish historian David MacPherson, tea had become cheaper than beer by the early 19th century. Furthermore, sugar had also become extremely cheap by this time, and the two were almost always consumed together. Though the price of coffee had decreased by this point, tea was the preferred drink because, unlike coffee, it still tasted good when diluted, which is often how the poor consumed it to save money.

Tea had other attractions as well. Drinking a hot, sweet beverage helped the meals of the lower classes, which generally consisted of dry bread and cheese, go down more easily. The warm beverage was especially appealing given Britain's cold and wet climate. Additionally, tea helped alleviate some of the consequences of industrial urbanisation, as drinking tea required boiling the water, thereby killing water-borne diseases like dysentery, cholera and typhoid.

However, the poor consumed tea very differently from the well-mannered ritual adopted by the upper classes. According to Mintz, "tea-drinking among the poor probably began in connection with work, not in the home". Day labourers brewed their tea out in the open and brought their tea equipment with them to work, as opposed to the private, domestic ritual that had previously surrounded tea-drinking. Afternoon tea possibly became a way to increase the number of hours labourers could work; the stimulants in the tea, accompanied by the calorie boost from the sugar and accompanying snacks, would give workers energy to finish the day's work.

==== Cultivation in India ====
The popularity of tea occasioned the furtive export of slips, a small shoot for planting or twig for grafting to tea plants, from China to British India and its commercial cultivation there, beginning in 1840. Between 1872 and 1884, the supply of tea to the British Empire increased with the expansion of the railway to the east. The demand, however, was not proportional, which caused prices to rise. Nevertheless, starting in 1884, innovations in tea preparation caused the price of tea to drop and remained relatively low through the first half of the 20th century. Soon afterwards, London became the centre of the international tea trade. With high tea imports also came a large increase in the demand for porcelain. The demand for teacups, pots, and dishes increased to go along with the popular new drink.

=== Today ===
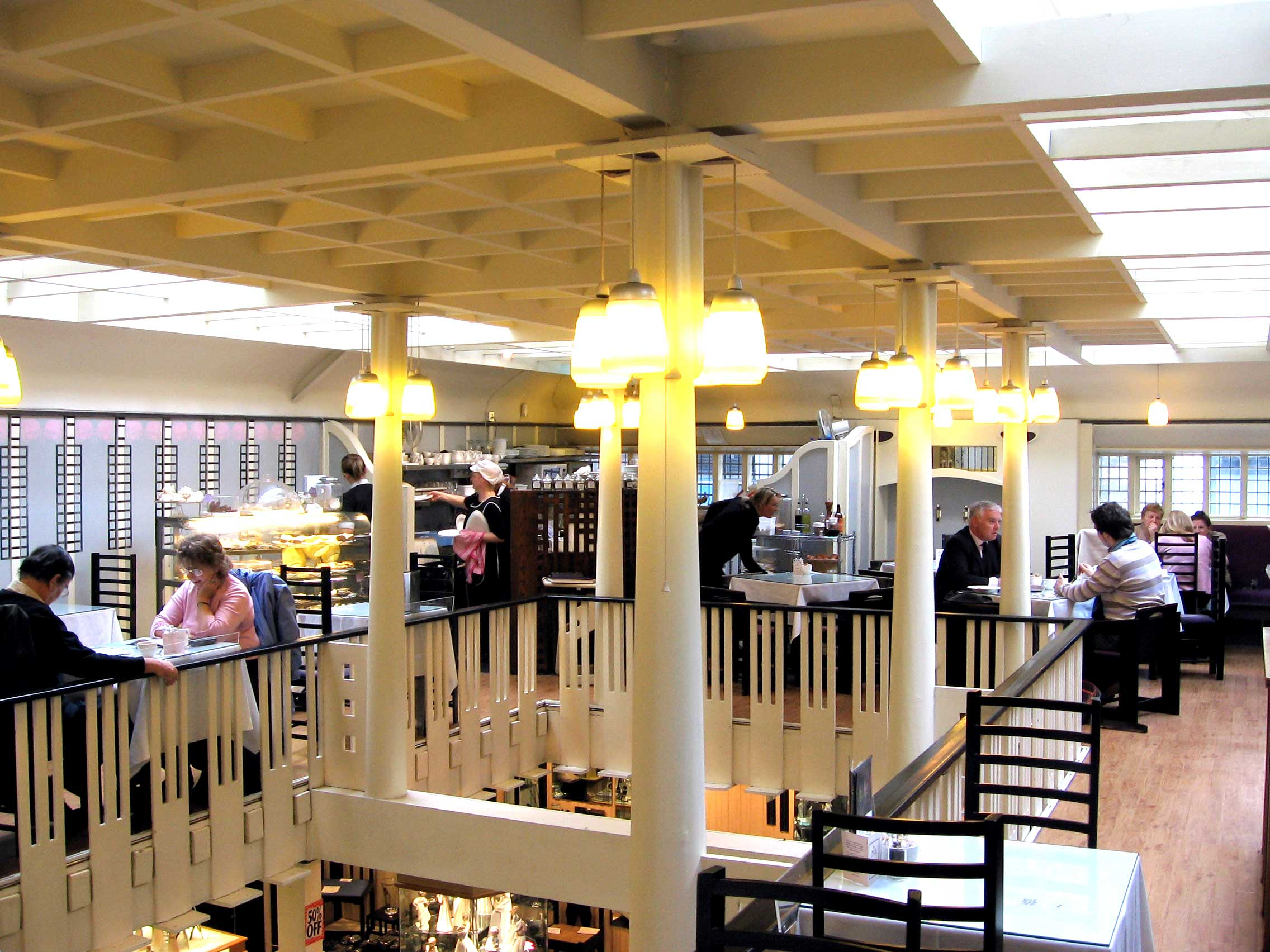
The Willow Tearooms, Glasgow

In 2003 DataMonitor reported that regular tea-drinking in the United Kingdom was declining. There was a 10.25 per cent decline in the purchase of normal teabags in Britain between 1997 and 2002. Sales of ground coffee also fell during the same period. Britons were instead drinking health-orientated beverages, like fruit or herbal teas, consumption of which increased 50 per cent from 1997 to 2002. A further unexpected statistic is that the sales of decaffeinated tea and coffee fell faster than the sale of more common varieties during this period. Declining tea sales were matched by an increase in espresso sales. Nevertheless, tea remains popular and is still ingrained in British culture and society.

The first locally grown tea, from Tregothnan in Cornwall, was harvested in 2005. By 2019, the plantation produced 20 tonnes of tea annually.

== Brewing ==
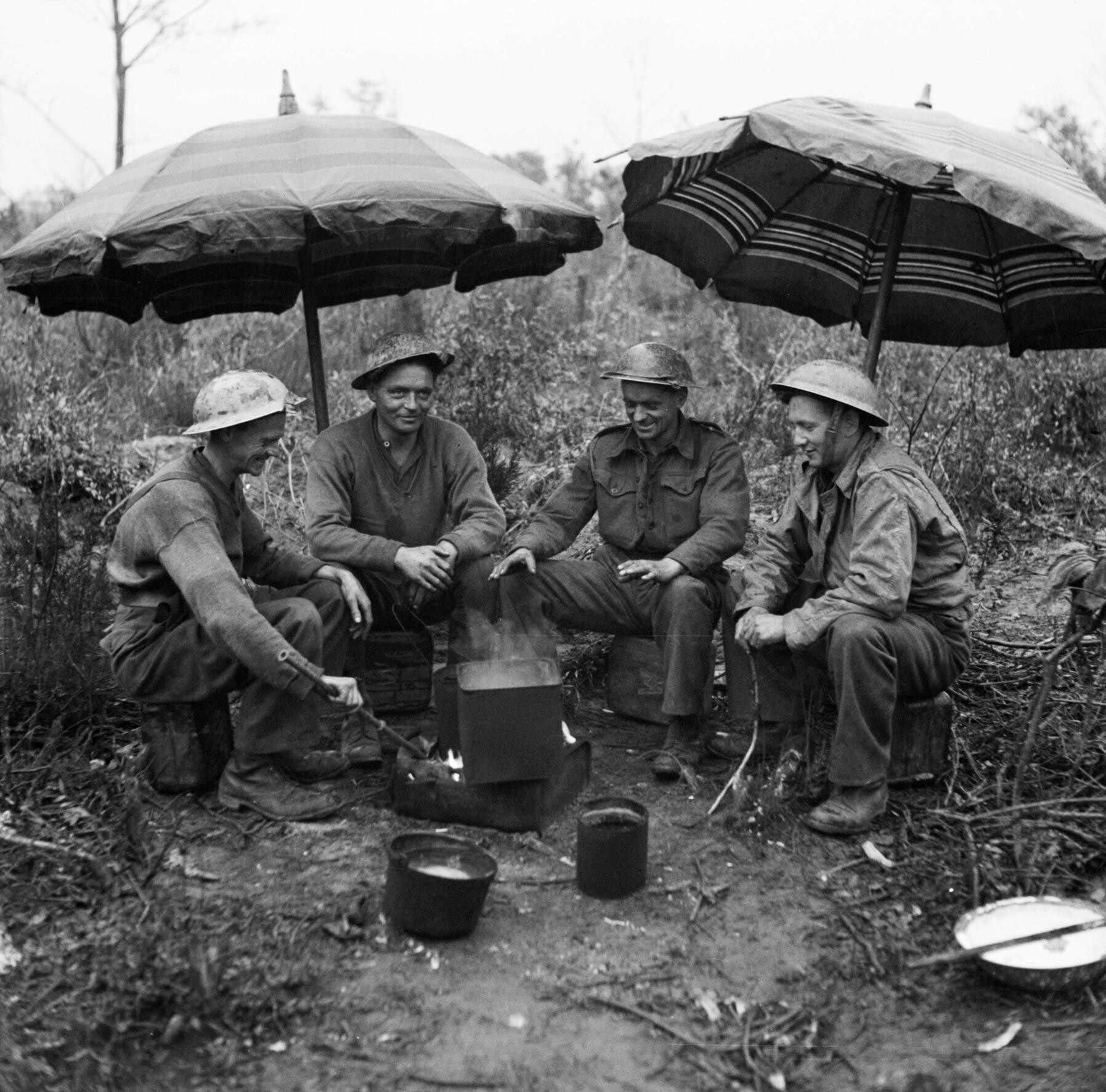
Gunners of the Royal Artillery brewing tea over a Benghazi burner in the field, February 1944

Even semi-formal events can be reason enough to use cups and saucers rather than mugs. A typical British tea ritual might run as follows (the host performing all actions unless noted):

1. The kettle is boiled with fresh water.
2. Boiling water is swirled around the teapot to warm it and is then poured out.
3. Tea leaves – usually black tea, loose or in an infuser – or tea bags are added to the teapot.
4. Fresh boiling water is poured into the pot over the tea leaves, infuser, or bags, and allowed to brew for two to five minutes.
5. The brewed tea is poured into the cup, through a tea strainer placed over the top of the cup if loose tea is being used. Infusers or tea bags may be removed once desired strength is attained. A tea cosy may be placed on the pot to keep the tea warm.
6. White sugar and milk (in that order) may be added, usually by the guest, though milk may be put in the cup before the tea.

The pot will normally hold enough tea so that some remains after filling the cups of all the guests. If this is the case, the tea cosy is replaced after everyone has been served. Hot water may be provided in a separate pot and is used only for topping up the pot, never for individual cups.

=== Milk and tea ===
"By putting the tea in first and stirring as one pours, one can exactly regulate the amount of milk, whereas one is likely to put in too much milk if one does it the other way round"

— One of George Orwell's eleven rules for making tea from his essay "A Nice Cup of Tea", appearing in the London Evening Standard, 12 January 1946.

Whether to put milk into the cup before or after the tea has been a matter of debate since at least the mid-20th century; in his 1946 essay "A Nice Cup of Tea" the English author George Orwell wrote, "tea is one of the mainstays of civilisation in this country and causes violent disputes over how it should be made". Whether to put the tea in the cup first and add the milk after or do the opposite has split public opinion, with Orwell stating, "indeed in every family in Britain there are probably two schools of thought on the subject".

Another aspect of the debate is the claims that adding milk at different times alters the flavour of the tea (for instance, see ISO 3103 and the Royal Society of Chemistry's "How to make a Perfect Cup of Tea"). Some studies suggest that heating milk above 75 °C (167 °F) when adding milk after the tea is poured does cause denaturation of the lactalbumin and lactoglobulin. Other studies argue that brewing time has a greater importance. In addition to considerations of flavour, the order of these steps is thought to have been, historically, an indication of class. Only those wealthy enough to afford good-quality porcelain would be confident of its being able to cope with being exposed to boiling water unadulterated with milk.

A further point of discussion on when to add milk is how it affects the time taken for the liquid to reach a drinkable temperature. While adding milk first will cause an initial drop in temperature, which leads to a more shallow cooling curve and slower cooling while also increasing volume (which would slightly increase the surface area through which the tea could lose heat), one study noted that adding milk first leads to the tea retaining heat out of all proportion with these effects. The major mechanism by which hot tea cools is not conduction or radiation, but evaporative loss, which is affected by the physical properties of the milk. The study concluded that lipids in milk prevent water from evaporating rapidly, thus retaining heat longer.

=== Drinking etiquette ===
Britons also hold opinions as to the proper manner in which to drink tea when using a cup and saucer. Historically, during the 1770s and 1780s, it was fashionable to drink tea from saucers. Saucers were deeper than is the current fashion, and therefore more similar to bowls like their Chinese antecedents. If one is seated at a table, the proper manner to drink tea is to raise the teacup only, placing it back into the saucer in between sips. When standing or sitting in a chair without a table, one holds the tea saucer with the off-hand and the teacup in the dominant hand. When not in use, the teacup is placed back in the tea saucer and held in one's lap or at waist height. In either event, the teacup should never be held or waved in the air. Fingers should be curled inwards; despite popular belief in the United States, no finger should extend away from the handle of the cup.

== Tea rooms ==
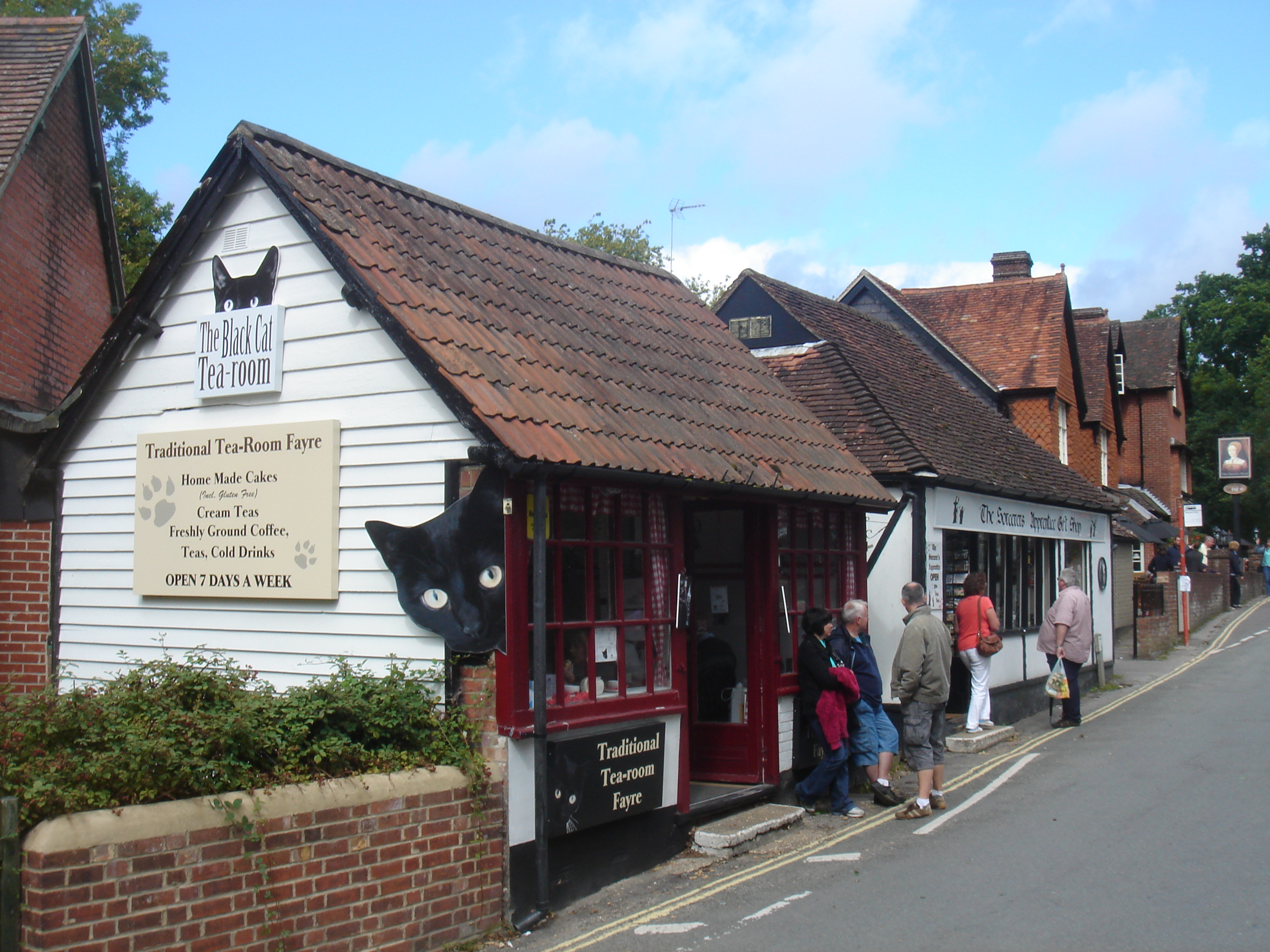
Some tea rooms in Burley, Hampshire, 2010

Tea rooms resulted from societal concerns about the working class's consumption of alcohol. One response to the perception of widespread dissolution was the temperance movement, which promoted tea as a healthful alternative to alcohol of any sort. From the 1830s many new cafes and coffeehouses opened, as a place to socialise that was not a pub or an inn.

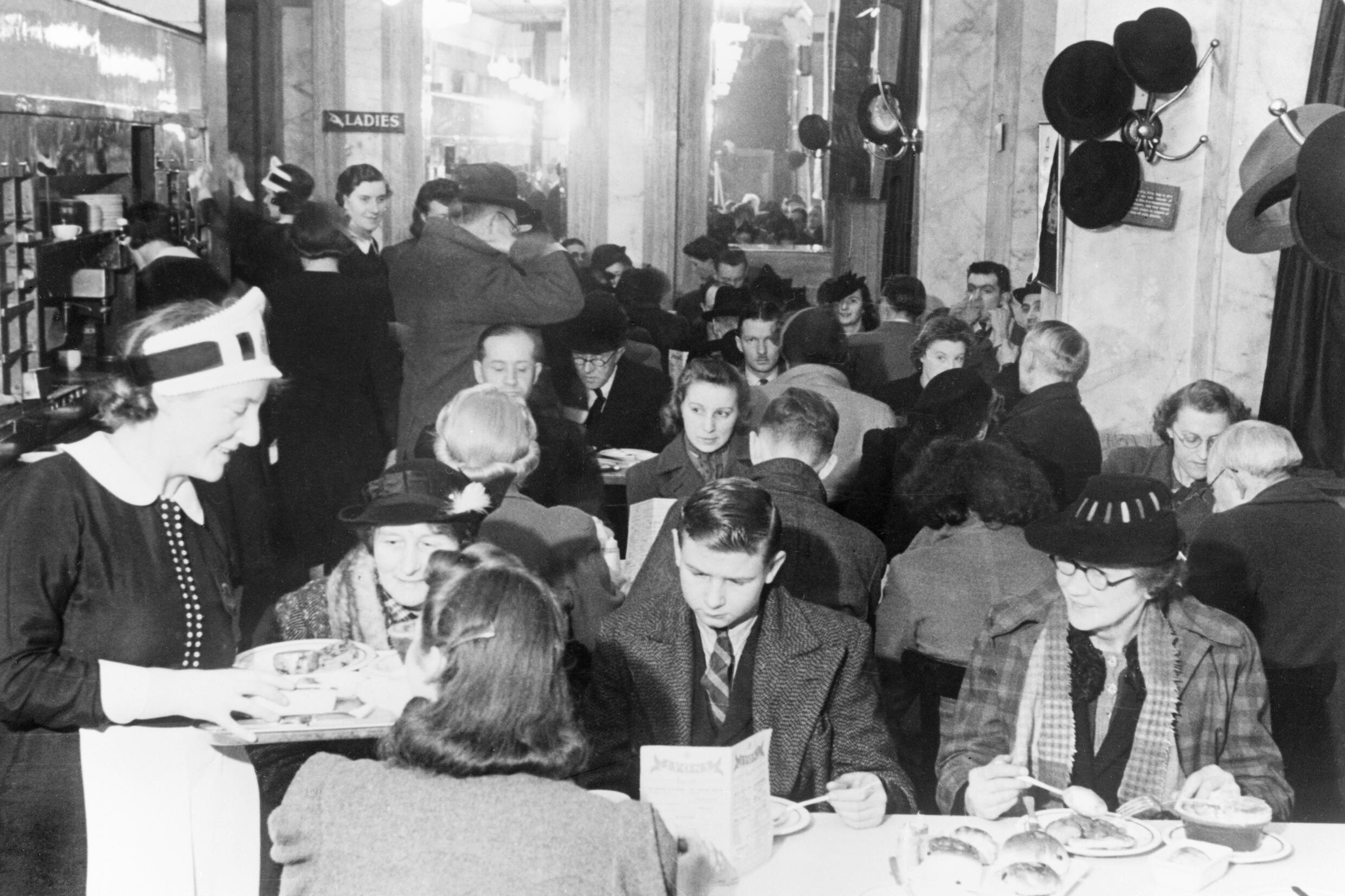
A waitress in a nippy uniform brings cakes to the table of customers enjoying afternoon tea at a Lyon's Corner House in London, 1942.

In 1864 the Aerated Bread Company opened the first of what would grow to be known as A.B.C. Tea Shops. The idea came from a London-based "manageress" at ABC "who'd been serving gratis tea and snacks to customers of all classes, [and] got permission to put a commercial public tea room on the premises". By 1923 the A.B.C. tea shops had 250 branches They were second only to J. Lyons and Co., whose teashops first appeared in 1894 and soon became the leading chain of teashops in Britain. Before the Second World War customers were served by uniformed waitresses known as 'Nippies'; after the war the teashops converted to cafeteria service.

In 1878 Catherine Cranston opened the first of what became a chain of Miss Cranston's Tea Rooms in Glasgow, providing elegant, well-designed social venues which, for the first time, provided for well-to-do women socialising without male company. They proved to be widely popular. She engaged up-and-coming designers and became a patron of Charles Rennie Mackintosh. He designed the complete building of the Willow Tearooms, which featured a strikingly modern exterior and a series of interesting interior designs. Similar establishments became popular throughout Scotland. The Glasgow Willow Tearooms building was fully restored between 2014 and its reopening in July 2018.

Tea rooms were also significant since they provided a place where women in the Victorian era could take a meal without a male escort, without risk to their reputations. Roger Fulford argues that tea rooms benefitted women in that these neutral public spaces were instrumental in the "spread of independence" for women and their struggle for the vote. Paul Chrystal characterises tea rooms as "popular and fashionable, especially with women", providing them with a dignified and safe place to meet, eat, and strategise on political campaigns.

There is a long tradition of tea rooms within London's hotels. For example, Brown's Hotel has been serving tea for over 170 years. Since the 1880s, fine hotels in both the UK and the US featured tea rooms and tea courts, and by 1910 they had begun to host afternoon tea dances as dance crazes swept both countries.

Tea rooms of all kinds were widespread in Britain by the 1950s, but in the following decades cafés became more fashionable, and tea rooms became less common. Nonetheless, there are still plenty of places that offer the opportunity to enjoy afternoon tea, a luxurious light meal of savoury snacks (tea sandwiches) and small pastries. A less formal alternative is a cream tea, particularly popular in the West Country, featuring a scone with jam and clotted cream. Another possibility is the high tea, hot savoury food as the day's final (but relatively early) meal. There are plenty of regional variations. In Scotland, for instance, teas are usually served with scones, pancakes, crumpets, and other cakes.

== Tea as a break ==
British workers, by law, have the right to a minimum of a twenty-minute break in a shift of six hours; government guidelines describe this as "a tea or lunch break".

== Tea as a meal ==
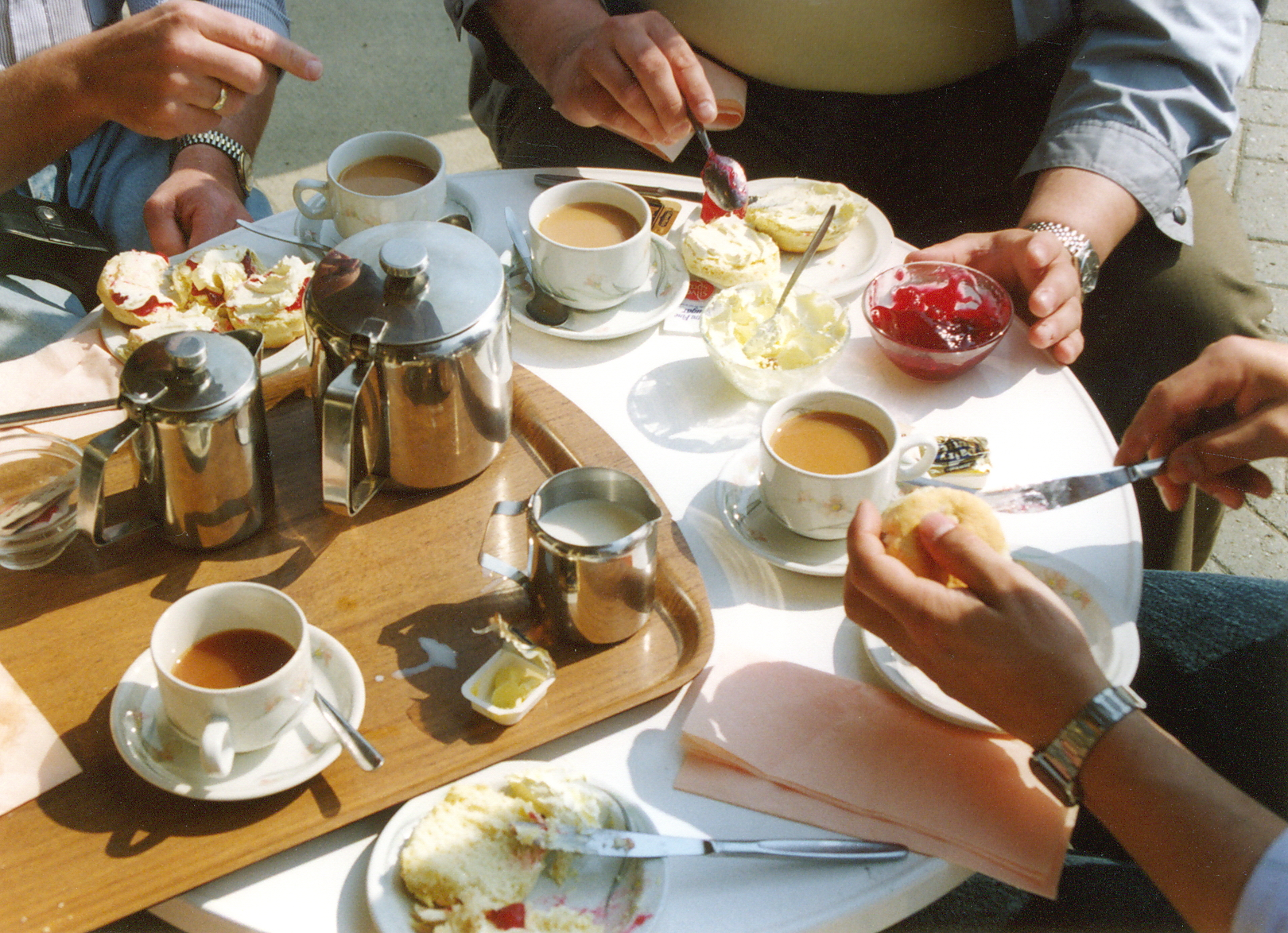
A cream tea underway at Bourton-on-the-Water, 1990

Tea is not only the name of the beverage but also of a light meal. Anna Maria, Duchess of Bedford, is credited with its creation, circa 1840. The notion of cakes or a light meal with tea passed to teahouses or tea rooms. In the West Country, cream teas are a speciality: scones, clotted cream and jam accompany the drink. Afternoon tea, in contemporary British usage, usually indicates a special occasion, perhaps in a hotel dining room, with savoury snacks (tea sandwiches) as well as small sweet pastries. Queen Victoria was known to enjoy sponge cake with her afternoon tea – after the invention of baking powder by Alfred Bird in 1843 which allowed the sponge to rise higher in cakes, a patriotic cake, Victoria sponge, was created, named after the Queen.

A social event to enjoy tea together, usually in a private home, is a tea party.

Tea or high tea can also refer to a savoury, hot, early evening meal. This usage is common in working-class British English and in Northern England, Wales, Scotland, and Northern Ireland. Internationally, it has also seen usage in Ireland and Australia.

== Tea cards ==
In the United Kingdom, a number of varieties of loose tea sold in packets from the 1940s to the 1980s contained tea cards. These were illustrated cards roughly the same size as cigarette cards and intended to be collected by children. Some of the best known were Typhoo tea and Brooke Bond cards, the last of whom also provided albums for collectors to keep their cards in. In the brand named Brooke Bond Dividend D, the card was a dividend ("divvy") against the cost of the tea.

Some renowned artists were commissioned to illustrate the cards, including Charles Tunnicliffe. Many of these card collections are now valuable collector's items.

== See also ==
=== Drinks ===
- Earl Grey tea, a classic English blended tea, flavoured with bergamot essential oil
- English breakfast tea
- Iced tea § United Kingdom
- Irish breakfast tea
- Prince of Wales tea blend
- Gunfire (drink), a cocktail made of tea and rum served in the British Army

=== Food ===
- Teacake

=== Appliances ===
- Boiling vessel, a water heater for use in cooking and preparing tea fitted to British Army battle tanks
- Brown Betty, an iconic type of teapot made from British red clay, known for being rotund and glazed with brown manganese
- Cube teapot, a heavy-duty type of teapot invented for making tea on ships
- Teasmade, an English appliance that combines a kettle and a teapot to make tea automatically by alarm clock
- Tea set, a set consisting of a tea pot, sugar bowl and milk jug

=== Other ===
- Dunking (biscuit)
- List of tea companies in the United Kingdom
- London Tea Auction, 1679–1998
- National Tea Day
- Tea culture in Ireland
- Tea lady
- TV pickup, a daily spike in power consumption in the UK due to the use of electric kettles during TV commercial breaks
