= Canadian tea regulations =

Canadian tea regulations encompass all tea products sold, processed or imported into Canada. Tea products in Canada are strictly defined regarding human consumption. Only dried Thea sinensis leaves and buds are considered tea products. Black tea is a black tea or a blend of two or more black tea that cannot be less than 30% waters-soluble content and must be between 4 and 7 percent ash when dry. Additional black tea regulations apply to unblended black teas; these must not be less than 25% water-soluble extractive and must be 4 to 7 percent ash and must also be dry. Green teas sold in Canada have separate regulations applied. Dry green teas cannot be less than 33% waters-soluble content and must be between 4 and 7 percent ash.
