= Black tea =

Type of tea

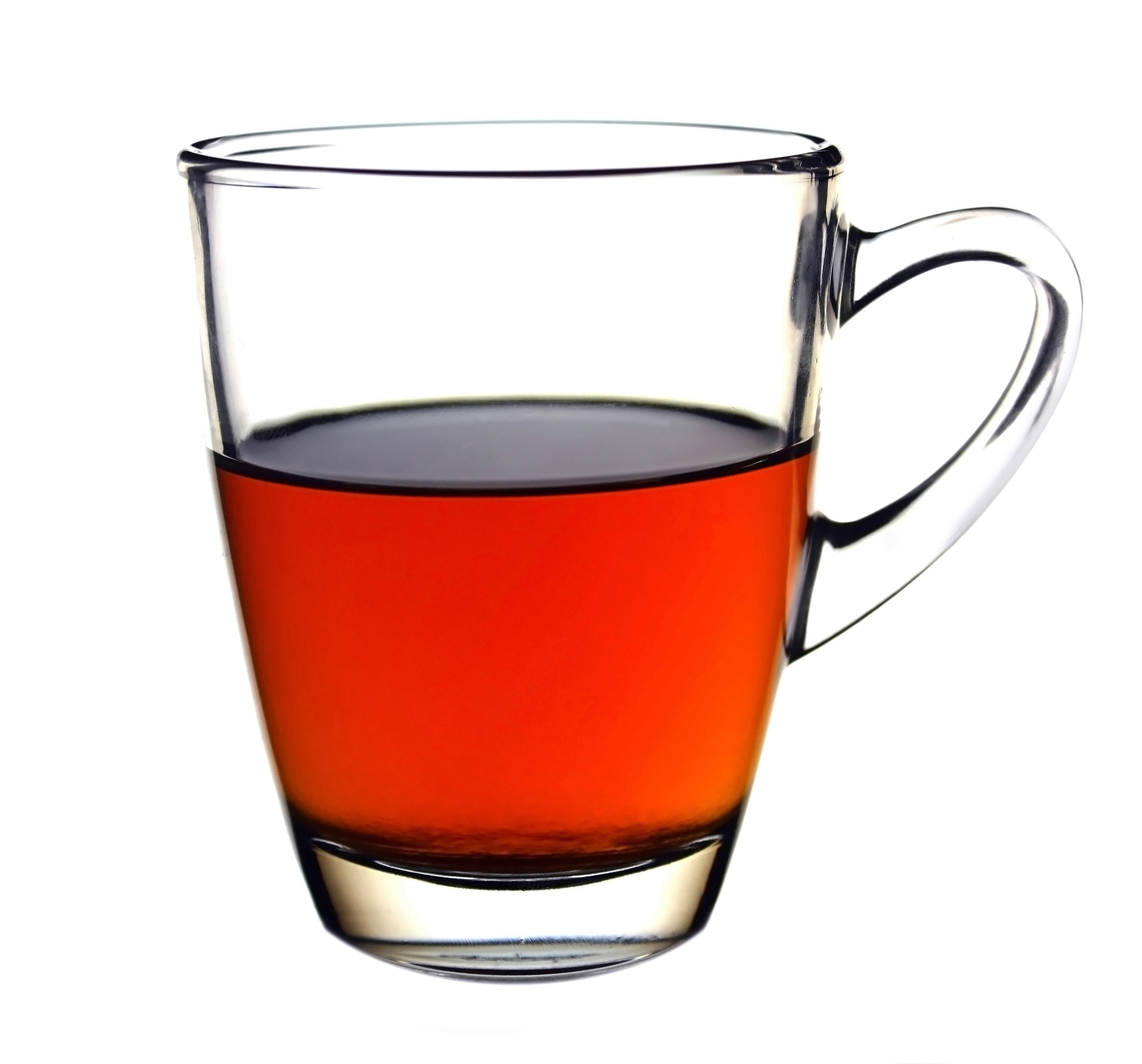
- A cup of black tea
- Type: Tea
- Origin: China, East Asia
- Colour: Red as brewed beverage
- Ingredients: Tea leaves
- Related products: Tea

Black tea
- Traditional Chinese: 紅茶
- Simplified Chinese: 红茶
- Literal meaning: Red tea
Transcriptions
Standard Mandarin
- Hanyu Pinyin: hóngchá
- Bopomofo: ㄏㄨㄥˊ ㄔㄚˊ
- Wade–Giles: hung^{2}-ch'a^{2}
- IPA: [xʊ̌ŋ.ʈʂʰǎ]
Yue: Cantonese
- Yale Romanization: hùhng-chàh
- Jyutping: hung4-caa4
- IPA: [hʊŋ˩.tsʰa˩]
Southern Min
- Tâi-lô: âng-tê

Black tea (also literally translated as red tea from various East Asian languages) is a type of tea that is more oxidized than oolong, yellow, white, and green teas. Black tea is generally stronger in flavour than other teas. All five types are made from leaves of the shrub (or small tree) Camellia sinensis, though Camellia taliensis is also rarely used.

Two principal varieties of the species are used – the small-leaved Chinese variety plant (C. sinensis var. sinensis), used for most other types of teas, and the large-leaved Assamese plant (C. sinensis var. assamica), which was traditionally mainly used for black tea, although in recent years some green and white teas have been produced.

First originating in China, the beverage's name there is hong cha (Chinese: 红茶, "red tea") due to the colour of the oxidized leaves when processed appropriately. Today, the drink is widespread throughout East and Southeast Asia, both in consumption and harvesting, including in China, Indonesia, Japan, Korea, and Singapore. Similar variants are also available in South Asian countries.

While green tea usually loses its flavour within a year, black tea retains its flavour for several years. For this reason, it has long been an article of trade, and compressed bricks of black tea even served as a form of de facto currency in Mongolia, Tibet, and Siberia well into the 19th century.

Black tea contains caffeine, negligible micronutrients, and no calories. There is no substantial clinical evidence that consuming black tea provides any medical benefits.

== Varieties and names ==
Unblended black teas are often named after the region in which they are produced. Different regions are known for producing teas with characteristic flavours.

Region	Tea	Native name	Origin	Description
China	Congou (Fujian)			
China	Congou (Fujian)	Tǎnyáng-gōngfu (坦洋工夫)	Tanyang Village, Fu'an, Fujian Province	The king of the Fujian Artisan Black Teas. One of the three Famous Fujian Reds.
China	Congou (Fujian)	Zhènghé-gōngfu (政和工夫)	Zhenghe County, Fujian Province	One of the three Famous Fujian Reds, with a slight honey flavour.
China	Congou (Fujian)	Báilín-gōngfu (白琳工夫)	Bailin Town, Fuding, Fujian Province	One of the three Famous Fujian Reds.
China	Lapsang souchong	Zhèngshān-xiǎozhǒng (正山小中種)	Wuyi Mountains, Fujian Province	Dried over burning pine, thereby developing a strong smoky flavour
China	Lapsang souchong	Yínjùnméi (銀駿眉)	Wuyi Mountains, Fujian Province	A higher grade version of Zhengshan xiaozhong (aka. Lapsang Souchong)
China	Lapsang souchong	Jīnjùnméi (金駿眉)	Wuyi Mountains, Fujian Province	One of the highest grade black teas in mainland China.
China	Keemun	Qímén-hóngchá (祁門紅茶)	Qimen County, Anhui Province	One of China's Famous Teas. The aroma of tea is fruity, with hints of pine, dried plum and floweriness.
China	Dianhong (Yunnan)	Yúnnán-hóngchá (雲南紅茶) / diānhóng (滇紅)	Yunnan Province	Well known for dark malty teas and golden bud teas.
China	Yingdehong	Yīngdé-hóngchá (英德紅茶)	Yingde, Guangdong Province	The tea has a cocoa-like aroma and a sweet aftertaste, one can find a peppery note.
China	Jiu Qu Hong Mei (Nine Winding Red Plum)	Jiǔqǔ-hóngméi (九曲紅梅)	Hangzhou, Zhejiang Province	This tea is characterised by tight fishhook-like leaves with a lustrous black colour. The infusion is brightly reddish and has a long smooth aftertaste.
Taiwan	Jinxuan (Taicha No. 12)	jīn xuān (金萱)	Chiayi County	Taicha No. 12 exudes a milk and nectar aroma. Its taste transitions from initial bitterness to a sweet glycol aroma.
Taiwan	Ruby Black Tea (Taicha No. 18)	Hong Yu HongCha (紅玉紅茶)	Yuchi, Nantou County	The aroma of cinnamon and a hint of mint.
Taiwan	Sun Moon Lake	Rìyuè-tán-hóngchá (日月潭紅茶)	Sun Moon Lake, Nantou City, Nantou County	Honey rich tones, sweet osmanthus, cinnamon and peppermint.
India	Assam	Ôxôm chah (অসম চাহ)	Assam State	Full-bodied, strong, and distinctively malty tea from the lowlands of Assam
India	Darjeeling	Dārjiliṁ chā (দার্জিলিং চা)	West Bengal State	Thin-bodied, floral, and fruity tea from Darjeeling with defining muscatel tones. Today often processed as a mixture of black, green and oolong elements, though still classed as black.
India	Kangra	Kāngada chāy (कांगड़ा चाय)	Kangra District, Himachal Pradesh State	It produces basil-cinnamon, java plum-blueberry blends and Chinese hybrids that is varied with others as a pale liquor, it has a subtle pungency with a vegetal aroma.
India	Munnar	Mūnnār chāya (മൂന്നാർ ചായ)	Munnar Town, Idukki District, Kerala State	This variety produces a strong-bodied golden yellow liquor with refreshing briskness and a hint of fruit. It has a medium toned fragrance, that is akin to malted biscuits.
India	Nilgiri	Nīlakiri tēnīr (நீலகிரி தேநீர்)	Nilgiris District, Tamil Nadu State	Intensely aromatic, strong, and fragrant tea from the Nilgiri Hills of Karnataka, Kerala, and Tamil Nadu.
Korea	Jaekseol (Bird's tongue)	jaekseol-cha (잭설차)	Hadong County, South Gyeongsang Province	Jaekseol tea is golden, light scarlet in colour and has a sweet, clean taste.
Nepal	Nepali	Nēpālī ciyā (नेपाली चिया)		Similar to Darjeeling tea in its appearance, aroma, and fruity taste, with subtle variation
Sri Lanka	Ceylon	Silōn tē (සිලෝන් තේ)		It is grown on numerous estates which vary in altitude and taste. High-grown tea is honey golden liquor and light and is considered to be among the best teas in terms of its distinct flavour, aroma, and strength. Low-grown teas are a burgundy brown liquor and stronger. Mid-grown teas are strong, rich, and full-bodied.
Turkey	Rize	Rize çayı	Rize, Rize Province, Black Sea Region	Characterised by its strong taste, it is mahogany in colour when brewed. Traditionally served with sugar crystals.
Iran	Lahijan	Chaie	Lahijan, Gilan Province, Caspian Sea (south)	Characterised by its strong taste and nice aroma, it is dark red in colour when brewed for ten to fifteen minutes, as is usual. Traditionally served with sugar crystals.

== Blends ==
Many finished black teas consist of blends of various varieties of black tea. In addition, black tea is often blended with various other plants or flavourings in order to obtain a beverage.

Blend	Description
Earl Grey tea	Black tea with bergamot oil.
Lady Grey tea	Black tea with bergamot oil, lemon peel, orange peel, and sometimes cornflower petals. Since Lady Grey is a registered trademark of the company Twinings, other brands have used similar names such as Madame Grey, Duchess Grey or Empress Grey.
English breakfast tea	A blend usually of Assam, Ceylon, and Kenyan teas, with Keemun sometimes included in more expensive blends.
Irish breakfast tea	Blend of several black teas: most often Assam teas and, less often, other types of black tea.
Masala chai Indian (South Asian) spiced tea	Combines black tea, spices native to the Indian sub-continent, milk, and a sweetener such as sugar or honey; a beverage from India, possibly consumed for many centuries in the ancient kingdoms of the region before the arrival of the Europeans. Though the possibility of a pre-colonial tea culture still remains disputed, one can argue without any doubt that the post-independence Masala chai has played a significant role in India's modern tea consumption culture, making it the largest tea consumer in the world. Masala chai has been widely recognised and adapted in the West by locals to their liking since its introduction by the British East India company, with changes in ingredients and the method of preparation to better suit western consumers.

== Manufacture ==
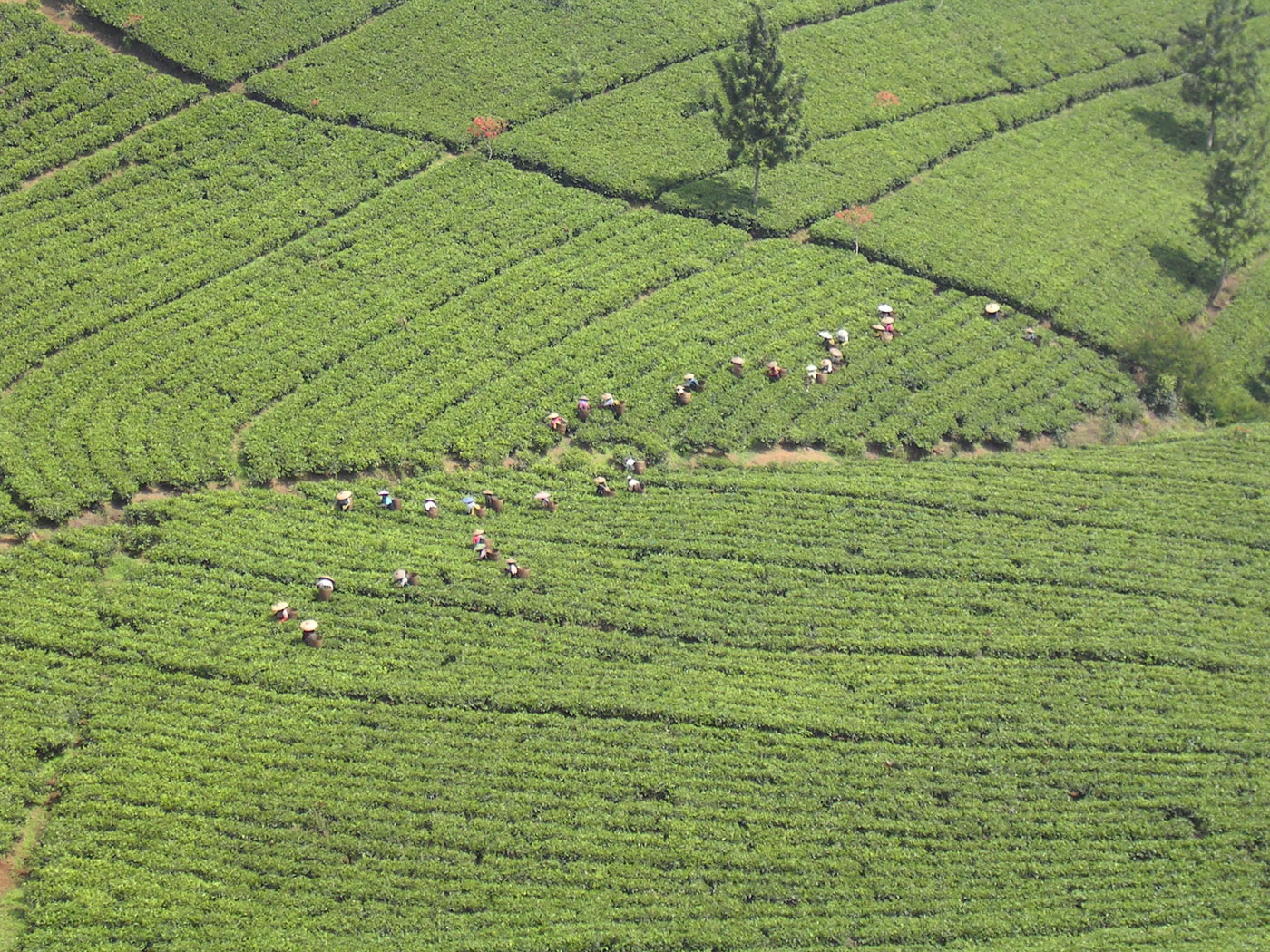
Tea plantation in Java, Indonesia

1. After the harvest, the leaves are first withered by blowing air on them.
2. Then black teas are processed in either of two ways, CTC (crush, tear, curl) or orthodox. The CTC method produces leaves of fannings or dust grades that are commonly used in tea bags but also produces higher (broken leaf) grades such as BOP CTC and GFBOP CTC (see gradings below for more details). This method is efficient and effective for producing a better quality product from medium and lower quality leaves of consistently dark color. Orthodox processing is done either by machines or by hand. Hand processing is used for high quality teas. While the methods employed in orthodox processing differ by tea type, this style of processing results in the high quality loose tea sought by many connoisseurs. The tea leaves are allowed to completely oxidize.
  Orthodox
  The withered tea leaves are heavily rolled either by hand or mechanically through the use of a cylindrical rolling table or a rotovane. The rolling table consists of a ridged table-top moving in an eccentric manner to a large hopper of tea leaves, in which the leaves are pressed down onto the table-top. The process produces a mixture of whole and broken leaves and particles which are then sorted, oxidized and dried. The rotorvane (rotovane), created by Ian McTear in 1957 can be used to replicate the orthodox process. The rotovane consisted of an auger pushing withered tea leaves through a vane cylinder which crushes and evenly cuts the leaves, however the process is more recently superseded by the boruah continuous roller, which consists of an oscillating conical roller around the inside of a ridged cylinder. The rotorvane can consistently duplicate broken orthodox processed black tea of even sized broken leaves, however it cannot produce whole leaf black tea. The broken leaves and particles from the orthodox method can feed into the CTC method for further processing into fanning or dust grade teas.
  "Cut (or crush), tear, curl" (CTC)
  A production method developed by William McKercher in 1930. It is considered by some as a significantly improved method of producing black tea through the mincing of withered tea leaves. The use of a rotovane to precut the withered tea is a common preprocessing method prior to feeding into the CTC. CTC machines then further shred the leaves from the rotovane by passing them through several stages of contra-rotating rotors with surface patterns that cut and tear the leaves to very fine particles.
3. Next, the leaves are oxidized under controlled temperature and humidity. (This process is also called "fermentation", which is a misnomer since no actual fermentation takes place. Polyphenol oxidase is the enzyme active in the process.) The level of oxidation determines the type (or "color") of the tea; with fully oxidised becoming black tea, low oxidised becoming green tea, and partially oxidised making up the various levels of oolong tea. This can be done on the floor in batches or on a conveyor bed with air flow for proper oxidation and temperature control. Since oxidation begins at the rolling stage itself, the time between these stages is also a crucial factor in the quality of the tea; however, fast processing of the tea leaves through continuous methods can effectively make this a separate step. The oxidation has an important effect on the taste of the end product, but the amount of oxidation is not an indication of quality. Tea producers match oxidation levels to the teas they produce to give the desired end characteristics.
4. Then the leaves are dried to arrest the oxidation process.
5. Finally, the leaves are sorted into grades according to their sizes (whole leaf, brokens, fannings and dust), usually with the use of sieves. The tea could be further sub-graded according to other criteria.

The tea is then ready for packaging.

== Tea grading ==
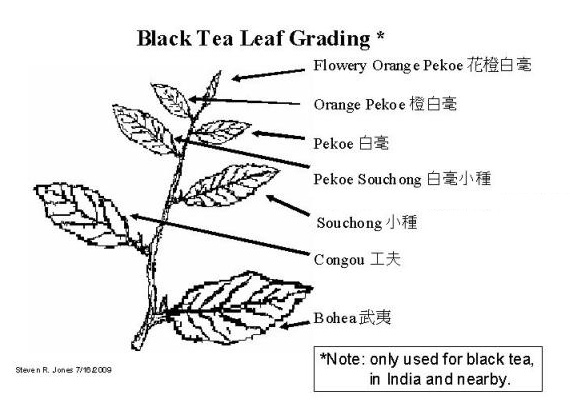
Black tea grading

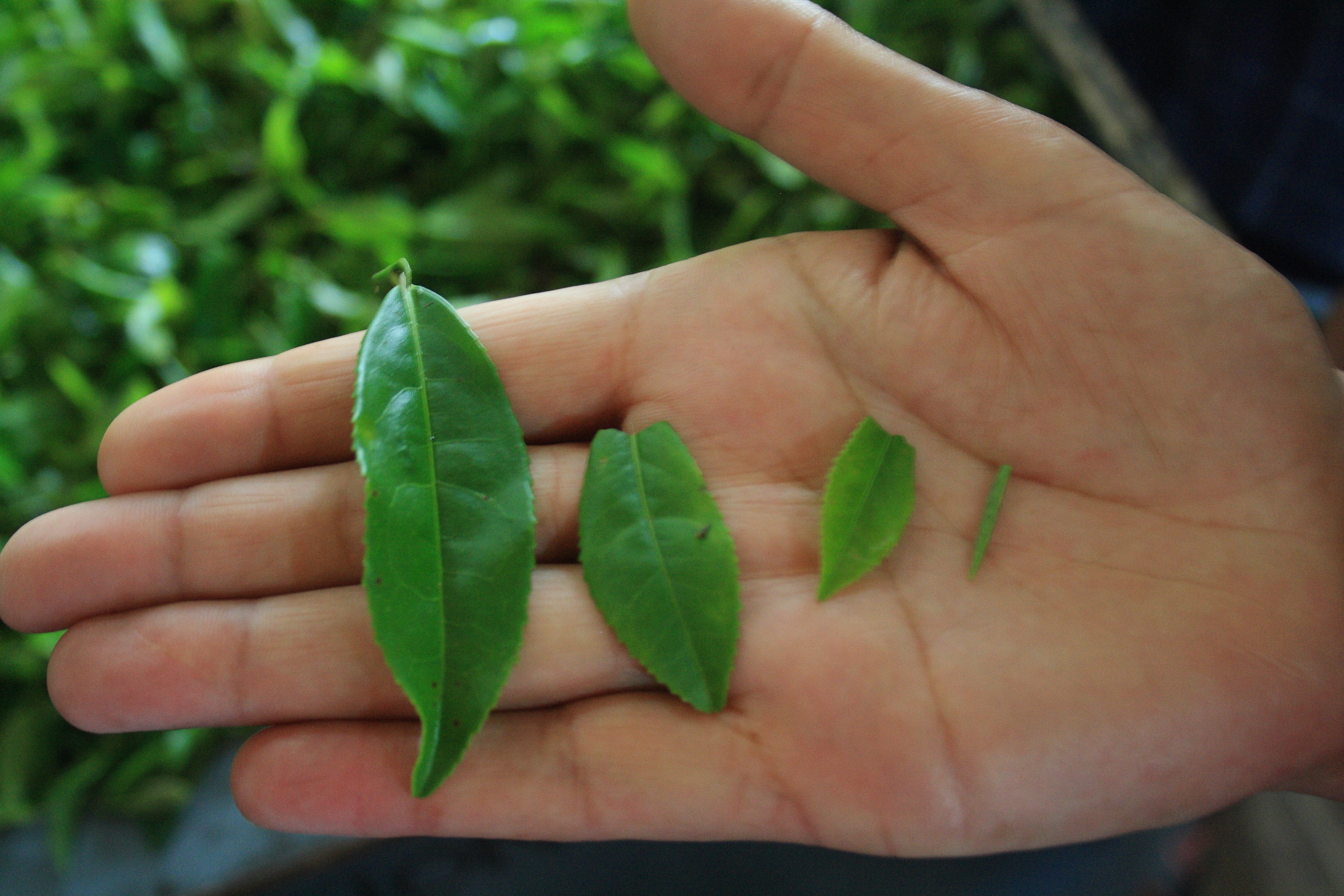
Fresh tea leaves of different sizes

Black tea is usually graded on one of four scales of quality. Whole-leaf teas are the highest quality, with the best whole-leaf teas graded as "orange pekoe". After the whole-leaf teas, the scale degrades to broken leaves, fannings, then dusts. Whole-leaf teas are produced with little or no alteration to the tea leaf. This results in a finished product with a coarser texture than that of bagged teas. Whole-leaf teas are widely considered the most valuable, especially if they contain leaf tips. Broken leaves are commonly sold as medium-grade loose teas.

Smaller broken varieties may be included in tea bags. Fannings are usually small particles of tea left over from the production of larger tea varieties, but are occasionally manufactured specifically for use in bagged teas. Dusts are the finest particles of tea left over from production of the above varieties, and are often used for tea bags with very fast and harsh brews. Fannings and dusts are useful in bagged teas because the greater surface area of the many particles allows for a fast, complete diffusion of the tea into the water. Fannings and dusts usually have a darker colour, lack of sweetness, and stronger flavour when brewed.

== Brewing ==
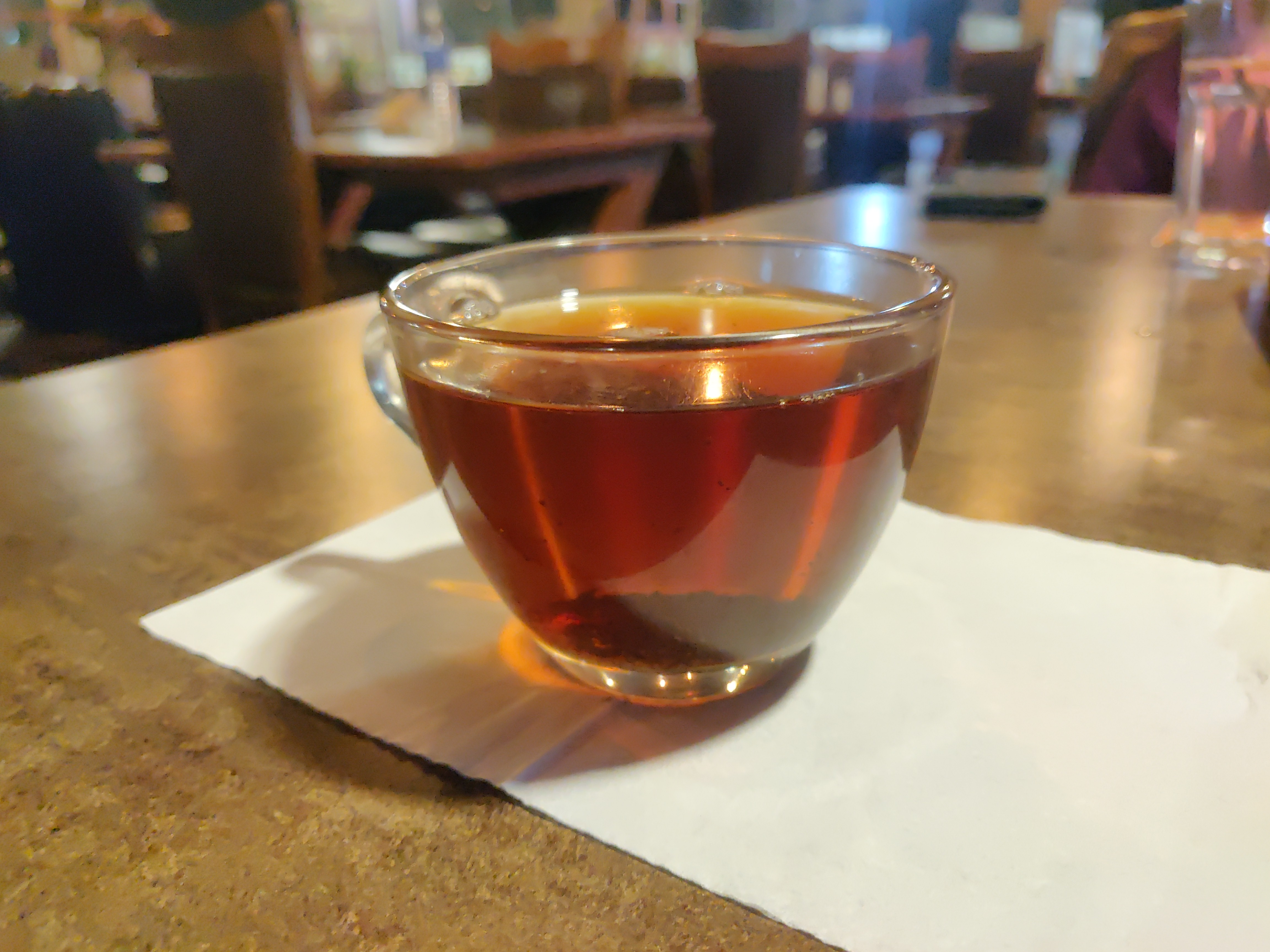
Black tea with spices

Generally, one uses 0.08 ounces (2.26 g) of tea per 8 US fl oz (237 ml) of water. Unlike green teas, which turn bitter when brewed at higher temperatures, black tea should be steeped in water brought up to 90–98 °C (194–208 °F) for 3–5 min.

Whole-leaf black teas, and black teas to be served with milk or lemon, should be steeped four to five minutes. The more delicate black teas, such as Darjeeling, should be steeped for three to four minutes. The same holds for broken leaf teas, which have more surface area and need less brewing time than whole leaves. Longer steeping times makes the tea bitter (at this point, it is referred to as being "stewed" in the UK). When the tea has brewed long enough to suit the drinker's taste, it should be strained before it is served.

A cold vessel lowers the steep temperature; to avoid this, the brewing vessel is rinsed with water at a temperature of at least 90 °C (194 °F) before brewing.

The ISO Standard 3103 defines how to brew tea for sensory testing. This standard is not meant to define the proper method for brewing tea intended for general consumption, but rather to document a tea brewing procedure where meaningful sensory comparisons can be made. This mix is thus more than twice as concentrated for normal consumption.

ISO 3103 black tea brewing

- Brew temperature 90–95 °C
- 100 ml water
- 2 g of tea
- Brewing time is 6 min

== Composition and research ==
Black tea contains 2 to 4 percent caffeine. The caffeine content of tea is affected by factors such as processing and brewing time. Typically, an 8-US-fluid-ounce (240 mL) cup of black tea without sweeteners or additives contains 47 mg of caffeine, and negligible quantities of calories and micronutrients.

The visible film often formed on black tea consists of oxidized polyphenols and calcium carbonate, and is therefore more pronounced for tea brewed with hard water.

Black teas from Camellia sinensis contain flavonoids, which are under preliminary research for their potential to affect blood pressure and blood lipids as risk factors for cardiovascular disease. Long-term consumption of black tea only slightly lowered systolic and diastolic blood pressures (about 1–2 mmHg).

Meta-analyses of observational studies concluded that black tea consumption does not affect the development of oral cancers in Asian or Caucasian populations, esophageal cancer or prostate cancer in Asian populations, or lung cancer.

Black tea is considered likely effective for improving alertness and possibly effective for certain conditions such as low blood pressure, but evidence does not support its effectiveness for preventing several types of cancer or diabetes; there is currently limited high-quality scientific evidence supporting most specific therapeutic uses of black tea.

== See also ==
- Assam tea
- English breakfast tea
- Gunfire (drink)
- Irish breakfast tea
- Nepal tea
- Rize tea
- Thai tea
- Vietnamese tea
- Yellow tea
- Tea culture in Japan
- Tea in France
- Tea in the United Kingdom
- Tea in Turkey
