= Irish breakfast tea =

Strong blend of black teas

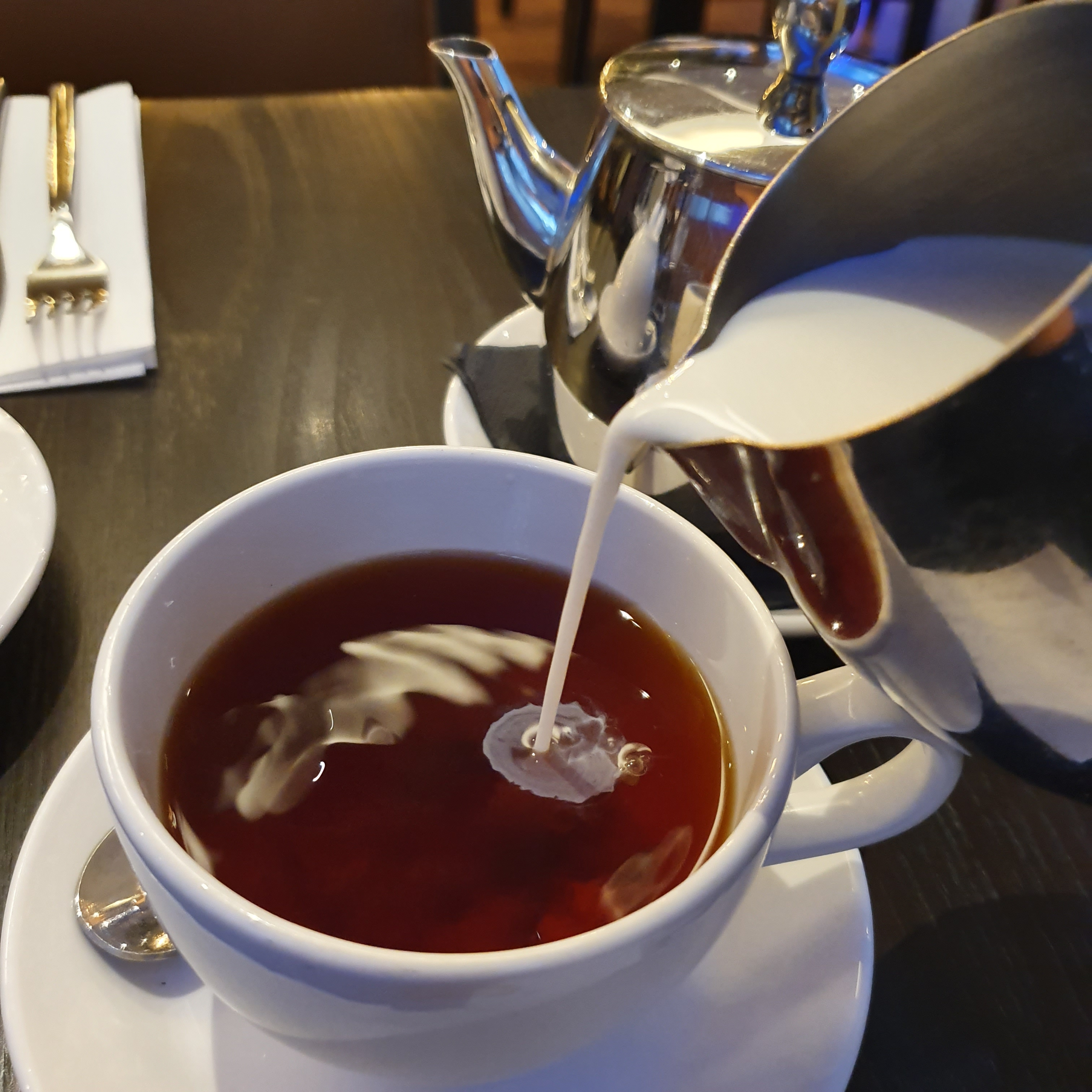
Irish breakfast tea being served with milk

Irish breakfast tea is a blend of several black teas, most often a combination of Assam teas and Ceylon teas. Irish tea brands, notably Barry's, Bewley's, Lyons and Robert Roberts in the Republic and Nambarrie's and Thompson's Punjana in Northern Ireland are heavily weighted towards Assam. It is one of the most popular blended teas, common in tea culture in Ireland. When tea was first transported from China to Ireland in the mid-18th century, it was mainly introduced to the wealthy as a result of its high cost and low demand. However, throughout the mid-19th century, Irish breakfast tea became readily available to those of both lower and higher socioeconomic classes.

== Serving ==
Due to its strength, Irish breakfast tea is commonly served with milk, but may also be consumed black (ie. no additives), with sugar, or with honey. Irish breakfast tea has a robust taste, and is red in colour. As dairy products are a major part of the Irish economy, most people drink tea with milk. Being a black tea, it has a strong flavour and higher caffeine content than green, oolong, or white teas. The tea is virtually never referred to as "breakfast tea" (except as the name of specific blends produced by Barry's, Bewley's, Thompson's and the British brand Twinings) and is drunk throughout the day. Irish breakfast tea leaves are sought from India, Rwanda, and Kenya.

== Blend ==
The Irish breakfast tea blend has no standard formula for its manufacture. However, most blends share common traits that collectively define "Irish breakfast" as opposed to British tea blends. The base of the Irish tea blend is a strong black Assam tea from India that is well known for its dark colour, strong flavour and malty aroma. The Assam is usually blended with one other, softer tea to bring out different flavours and to support the Assam. These additional teas are usually sourced from Kenya, with a popular choice being Kenyan Broken Pekoe. The proportion of Assam tea to the ancillary leaves is what gives Irish breakfast tea its defining flavour. The strength of the tea blend not only comes from the type of tea leaves used in the preparation, but also from the processing of the leaves before packaging. Irish breakfast tea tends to be made with leaves that have been broken, meaning leaves that have been dried and then lightly crushed before packaging. This process allows the tea to steep more rapidly and release more flavour per leaf than an unbroken leaf.

== Packaging ==
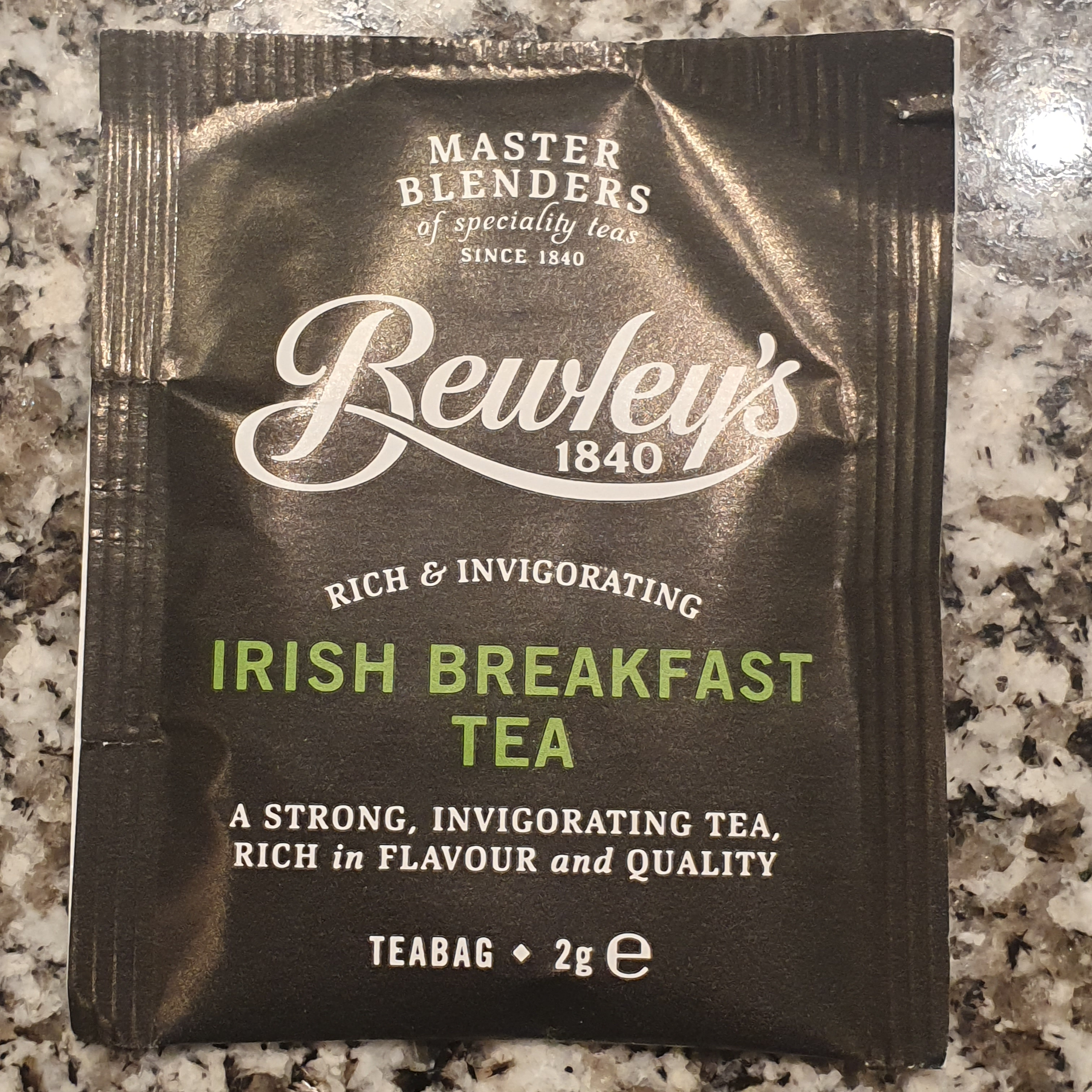
Bewley's Irish breakfast

The majority of tea is sold as boxes of tea bags, but all of the major brands are available in loose leaf form, allowing the consumer to inspect the proportion of hand-picked buds and whole tea leaves as against broken fannings of indeterminate origin. When brewed, the tea varies in colour from very dark red to brown.

== See also ==
- English breakfast tea
- English afternoon tea
- Full breakfast
- Tea culture in Ireland
- Tea in the United Kingdom
