= English breakfast tea =

Type of tea

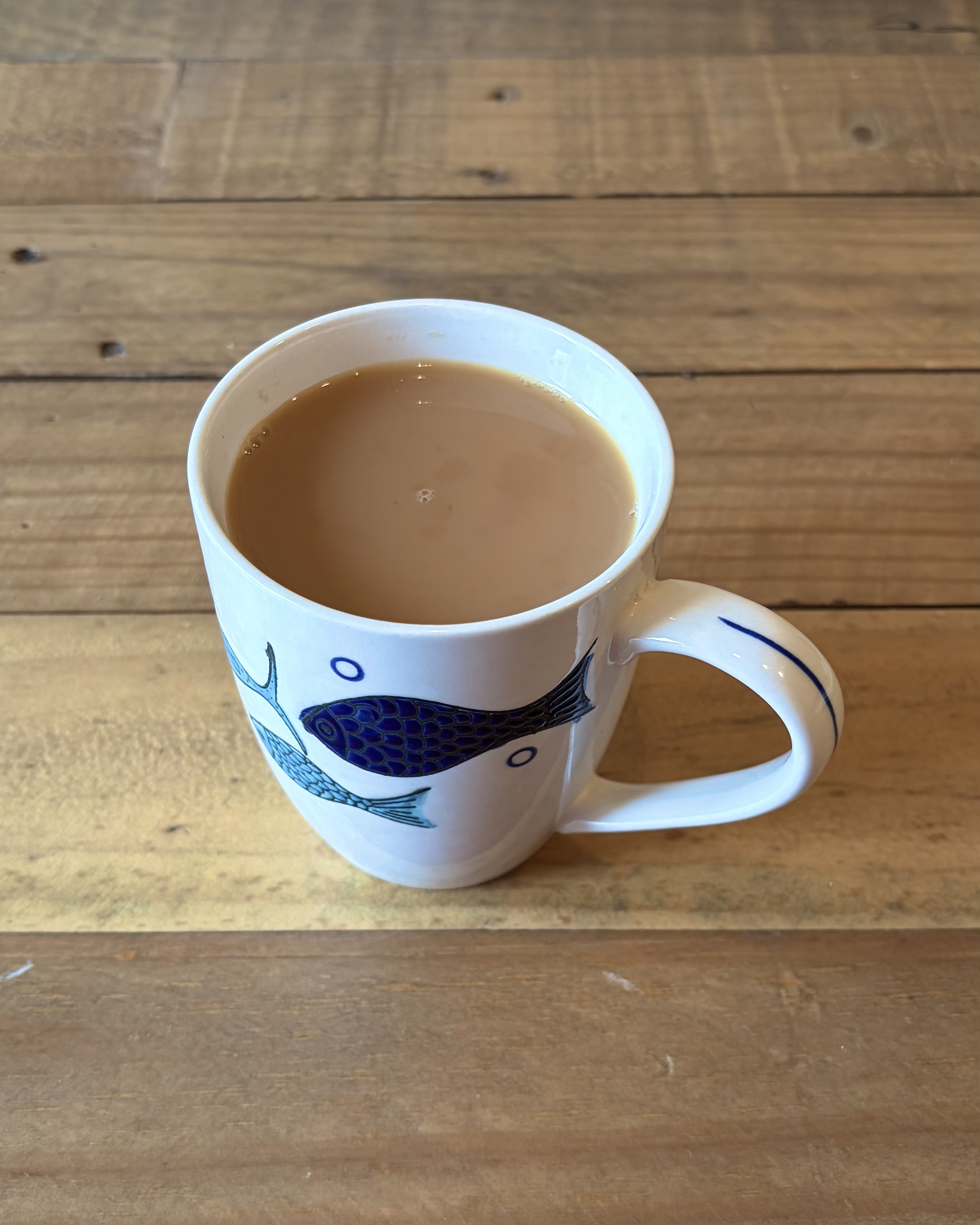
A mug of English breakfast tea, served with milk

English breakfast tea or simply breakfast tea is a traditional blend of black teas originating from Assam, Ceylon and Kenya. It is one of the most popular blended teas, common in British and Irish tea culture, which developed since their exposure to Asian tea culture.

English breakfast tea is a black tea blend usually described as full-bodied, robust, rich and blended to go well with milk and sugar, in a style traditionally associated with a hearty full English breakfast.

The black teas included in the blend vary, with Assam, Ceylon and Kenyan teas predominating, and Keemun sometimes included in more expensive blends.

== Origins and history ==
Accounts of its origins vary. Drinking a blend of black teas as part of the breakfast meal is a longstanding British and Irish custom. The term breakfast tea has been applied by vendors since at least the late 18th century.

The current naming practice of the blend is claimed to have originated not in England but America, as far back as Colonial times. An additional account (referencing a period-era Journal of Commerce article) dates the blend to 1843 and a tea merchant named Richard Davies in New York City. Davies, an English immigrant, started with a base of Congou and added a bit of Pekoe and Pouchong. It sold for 50 cents per pound (0.45 kg) (equivalent to $17.28 per pound in 2025), and its success led to imitators, helping to popularize the name. An investigation to find the original Journal of Commerce article failed to locate it but did come upon an earlier reference to the same story in an 1876 edition of the Daily Alta California, citing "a New York commercial journal" and dating the tea's origin to 1844. In an 1884 American publication it was noted that "Bohea teas (are) known to trade in this country as 'English Breakfast' tea, from its forming the staple shipment to England".

In the UK, the popularisation of breakfast tea has been attributed in part to Queen Victoria. At her Scottish residence of Balmoral in 1892, she tasted and enjoyed a blend so named, and returned to London with a supply. Despite its Scottish origin, the generic blend subsequently acquired the prefix "English".

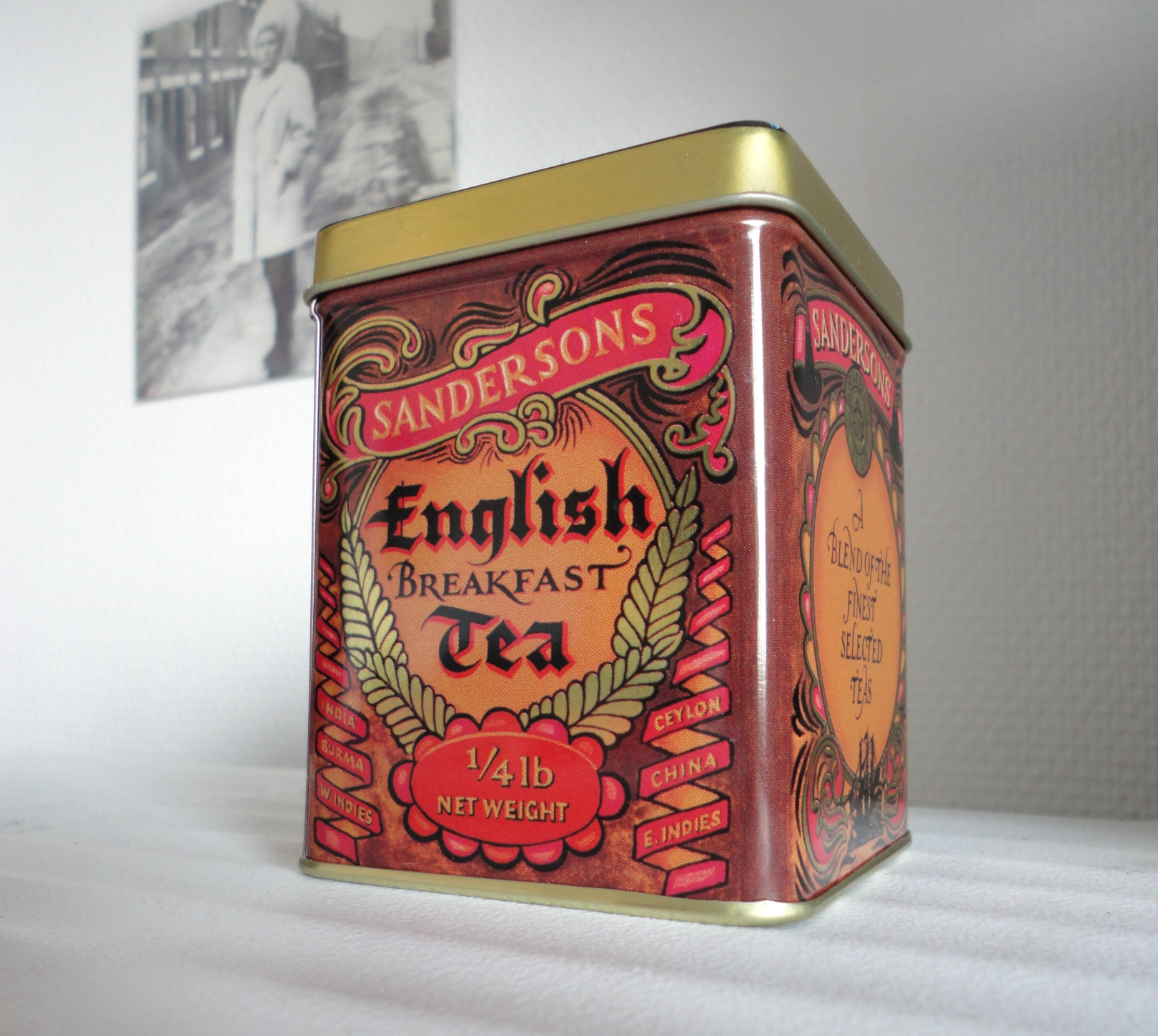
English breakfast tea tin

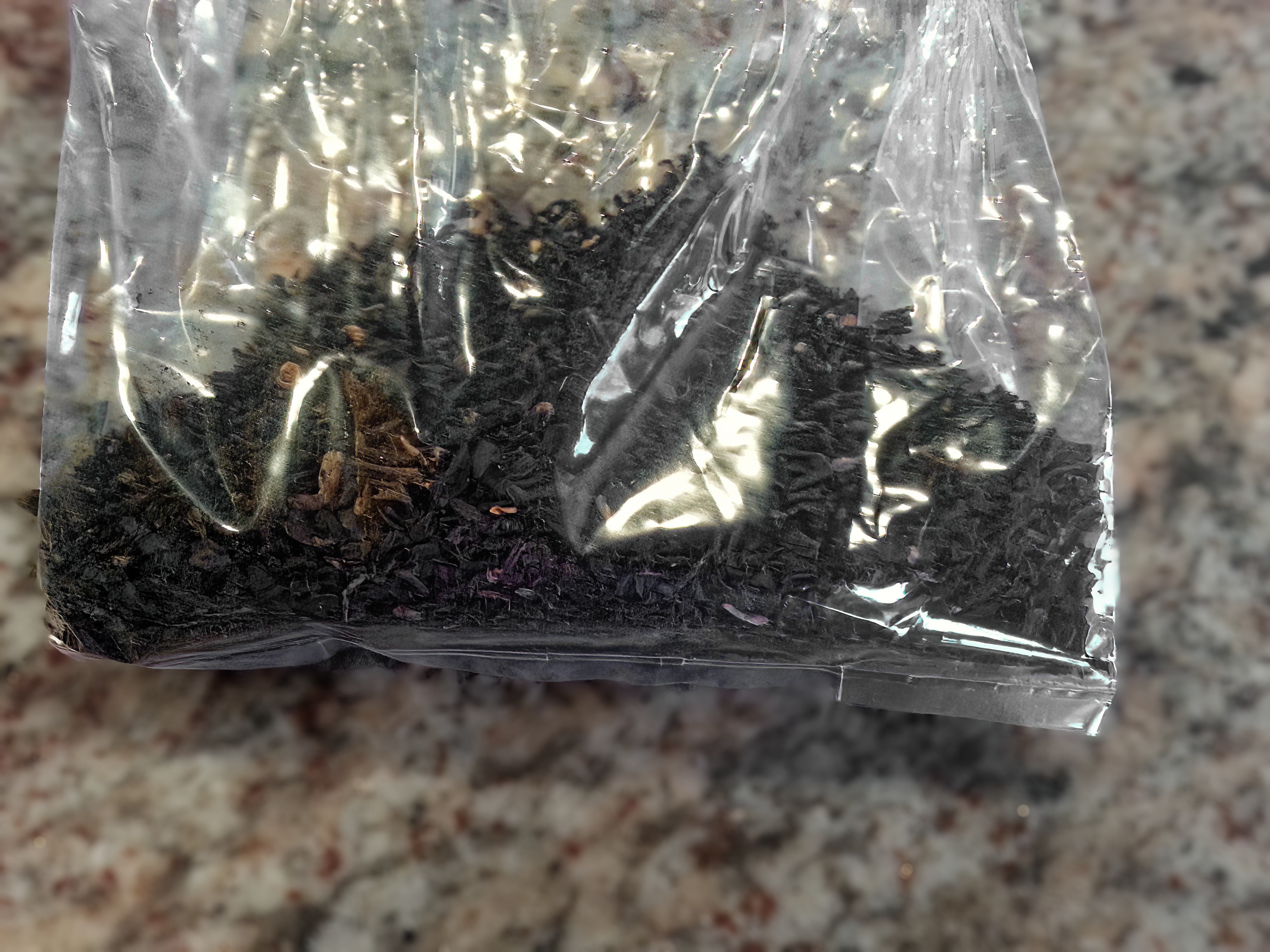
One ounce (28 g) of English breakfast tea

== See also ==
- Builder's tea
- English afternoon tea
- Irish breakfast tea
