= Punjana =

Tea brand by Thompson' Tea

Punjana Limited
- Company type: Private
- Founded: 1896; Belfast, United Kingdom of Great Britain and Ireland
- Founder: McArthur and Willis
- Headquarters: Belfast, Northern Ireland
- Key people: Robert Samuel Thompson
- Products: Teas
- Website: Thompson's Tea

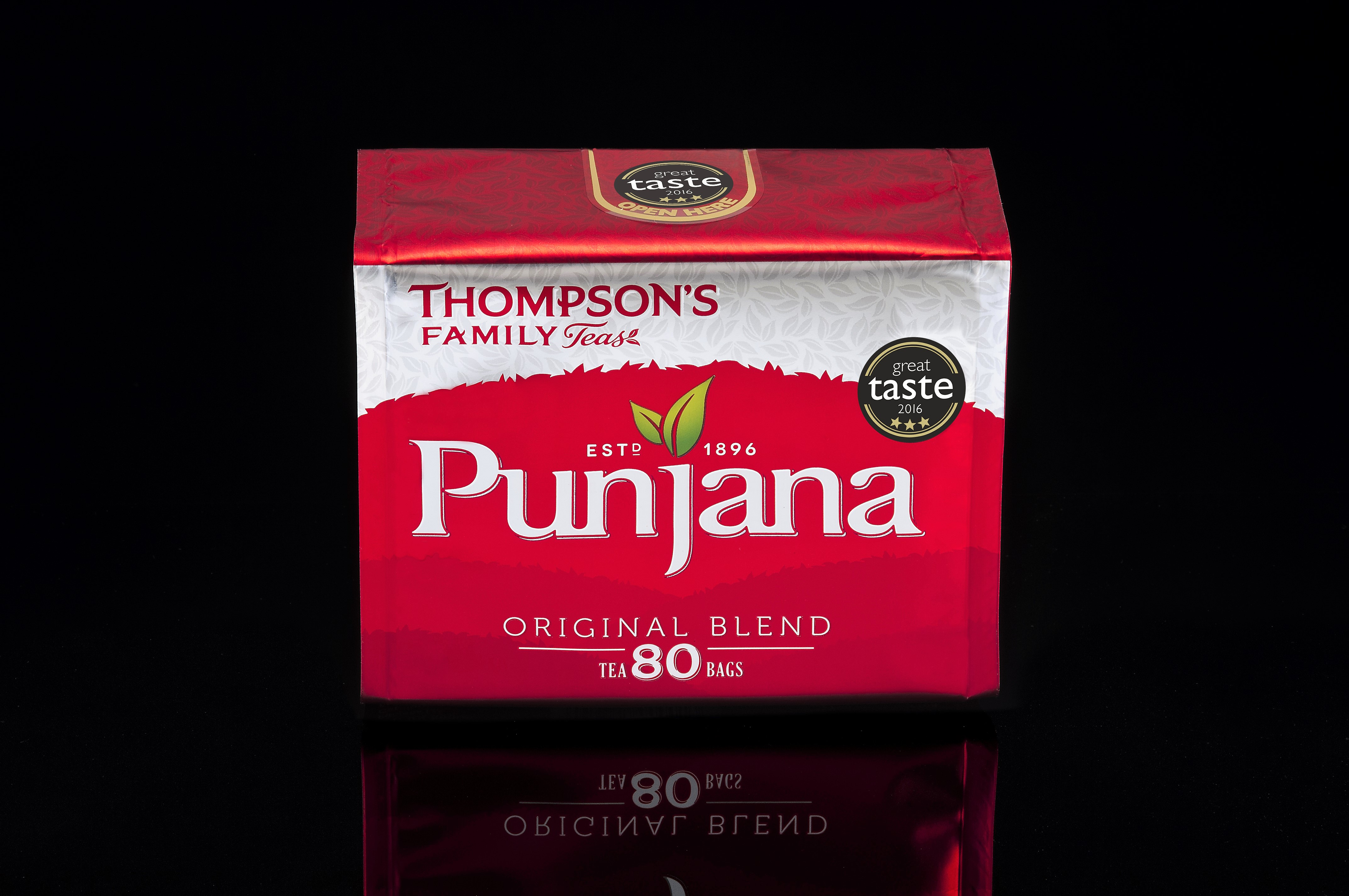
Thompson's Punjana

Punjana is a brand of tea produced by the Belfast-based tea company Thompson's Tea. Thompson's Tea was founded in 1896 when Robert S. Thompson was made partner of McArthur and Willis. Thompson's Punjana has since become the best-selling tea in Northern Ireland and one of the most popular brands in Scotland. Thompson's source the leaves for their tea from Assam, Northeast India and from the slopes of Mount Kenya.

== History ==
In the late 19th century, Robert S. Thompson trained in the art of tea tasting. Soon after joining the tea industry in 1887, he was made a partner at McArthur and Willis in 1896. Thompson subsequently led the company for 51 years, and the association of the company with the Thompson family was only strengthened when, in the post-war years, James and Tony Thompson also became partners.

It was the introduction of the second generation of the Thompson family to the tea industry that brought with it the birth of the Punjana brand in the early 1950s. The name Punjana, was dreamed up by second generation James Thompson and his wife, Lillias, the inspiration coming from an inscription of the word "Punjab" etched on the famous Gillespie statue in Comber.

== Trivia ==
- In 2007, 59,500 cups of Punjana tea were consumed every hour of the day, 365 days a year.
