= A Nice Cup of Tea =

Essay by George Orwell

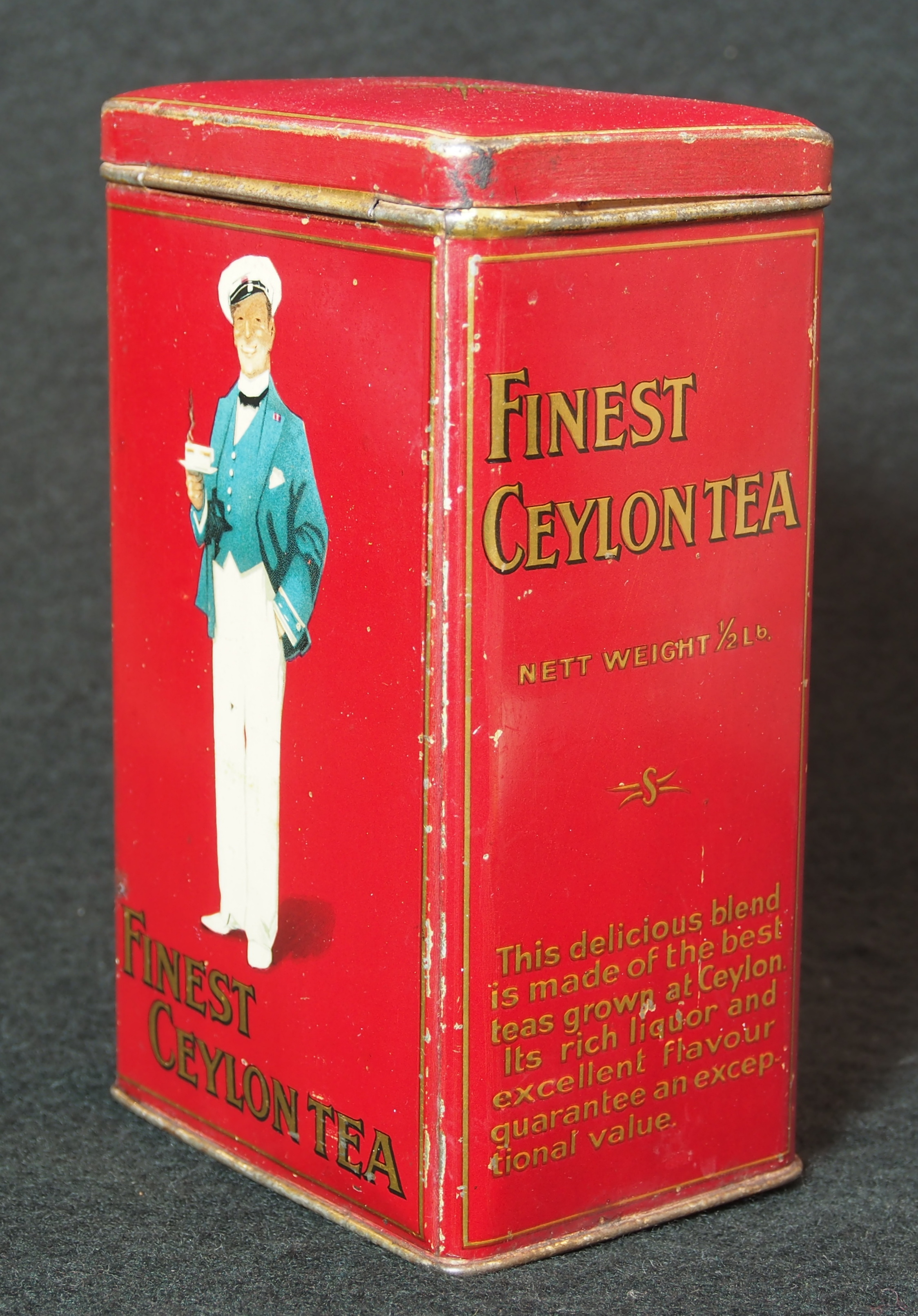
Orwell's preference was Indian and Ceylonese teas over those from China.

"A Nice Cup of Tea" is an essay by English author George Orwell, first published in the London Evening Standard on 12 January 1946. It is a discussion of the craft of making a cup of tea, including the line: "Here are my own eleven rules, every one of which I regard as golden."

Orwell wrote that "tea is one of the mainstays of civilisation in this country and causes violent disputes over how it should be made", and his rules cover such matters as the best shape for a teacup, the advisability of using water that is still boiling, and his preference for very strong tea. He also considers what he calls "one of the most controversial points of all" – whether to put tea in the cup first and add the milk after, or the other way around, acknowledging, "indeed in every family in Britain there are probably two schools of thought on the subject". Orwell says tea should be poured first because "one can exactly regulate the amount of milk whereas one is liable to put in too much milk if one does it the other way round". "I maintain that my own argument is unanswerable", he writes.

== See also ==
- Bibliography of George Orwell
- ISO 3103
- Tea classics
- Tea in the United Kingdom
