= Congou =

Chinese black tea

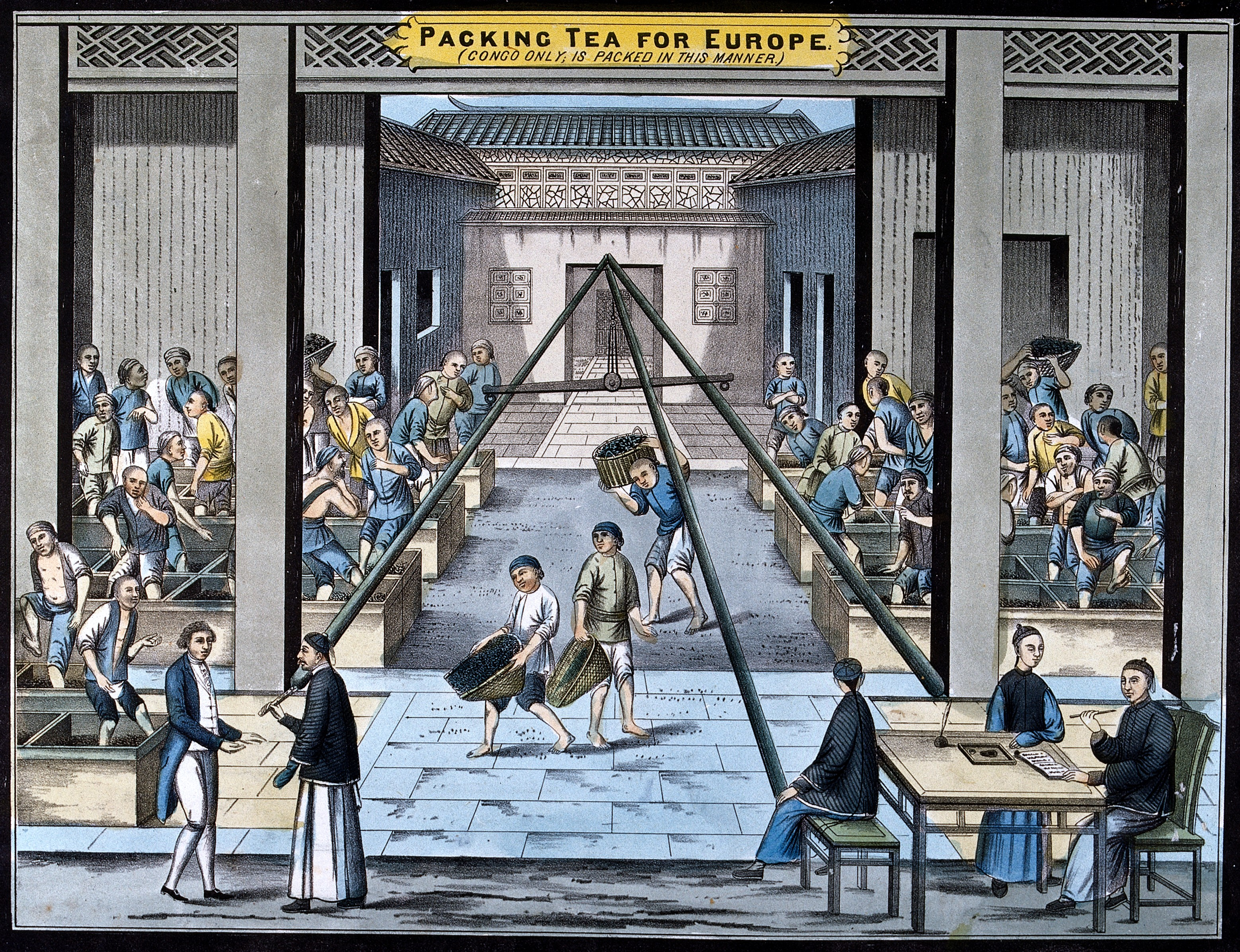
Coloured lithograph depicting a tea plantation in Qing China: workers tread down congou tea into chests.

Congou (Chinese: 工夫紅茶; pinyin: gōngfu hóngchá) is a description of a black Chinese tea variety used by 19th-century tea importers in America and Europe. It was the base of the 19th-century English Breakfast tea blend.

== Name ==
The etymology of the tea is the same as kung fu, from the Chinese for "skill" (工夫; gongfu), via the Hokkien pronunciation kang-hu. This is the same word as in the Gongfu tea ceremony (工夫茶, sometimes 功夫茶), and congou is locally drunk in this style.

The popular variety Panyang Congou (or Panyong Congou) is a corruption of Tanyang (Chinese: 坦洋; pinyin: tǎnyáng), the name of a small village in Fu'an, Fujian that popularized the style. Once the most expensive style of black tea in the West, with exports to over twenty countries and a gold medal at the Panama–Pacific International Exposition in 1915, a state-owned factory established in 1958 continues to produce small amounts.

== Identification ==
The source the importers called "Cangou" was Amoy Kanghu tea, or Teochew Kanghu tea, the 'espresso' of Chinese teas (潮州工夫茶; Chaozhou Gongfu cha or 潮汕工夫茶), or Keemun Gongfu or Congou (祁門功夫) made with careful skill ("gongfu") to produce thin, tight strips without breaking the leaves.
