= Tea tasting =

Tasting tea

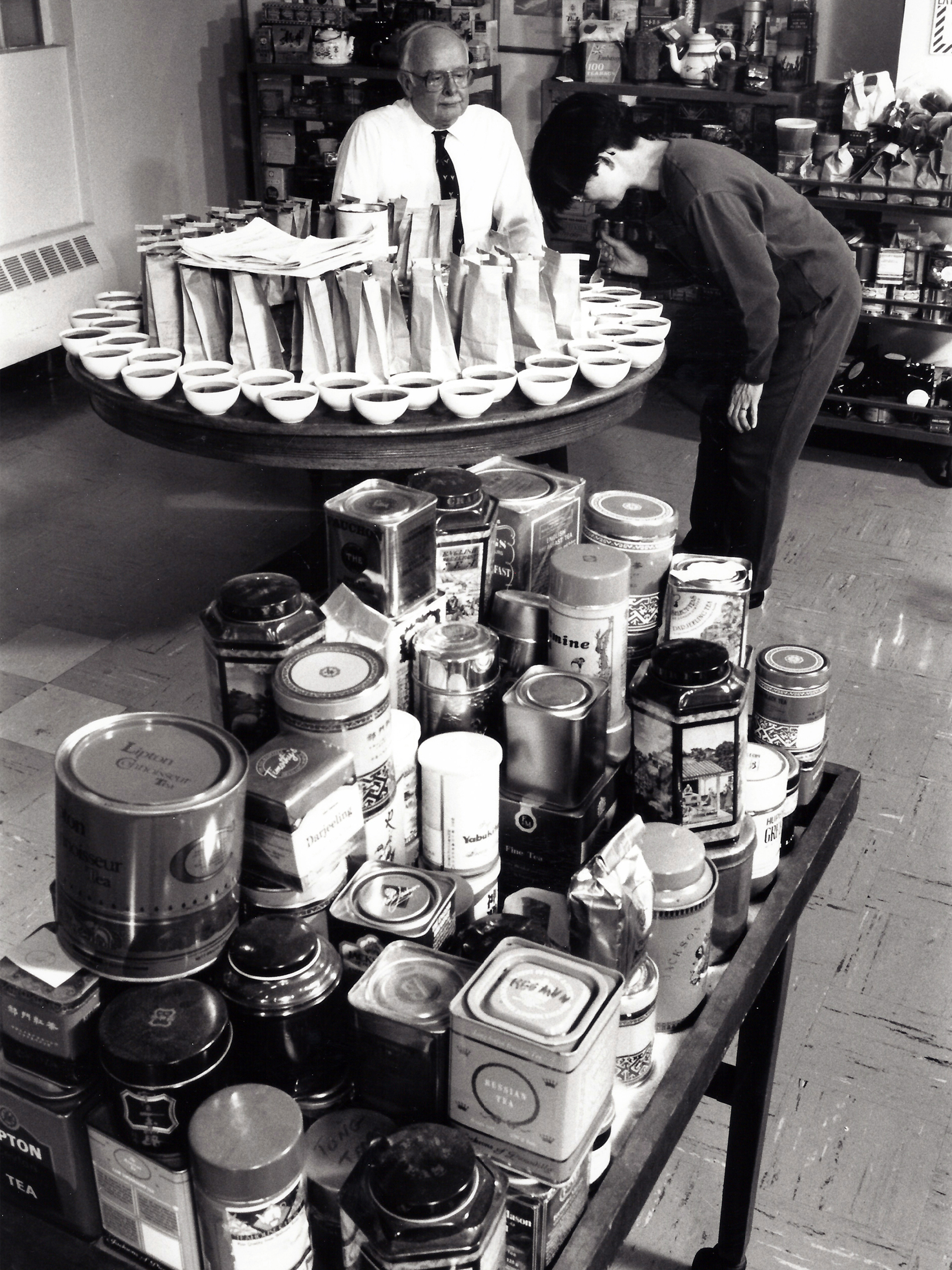
The United States Food and Drug Administration tested tea until 1996.

Tea tasting is the process in which a trained taster determines the quality of a particular tea. Due to climatic conditions, topography, manufacturing process, and different cultivars of the Camellia sinensis plant (tea), the final product may have vastly differing flavours and appearance. A trained tester can detect these differences and ascertain the tea's quality prior to sale or possible blending.

== Objectives ==
The taster's objectives depend on the tea's intended purpose. The qualities desired for a tea for blending with other teas can be quite different from those desired for a tea ready for drinking.

== Techniques ==
The ISO 3103 standard describes a standardised method for brewing teas to make meaningful sensory comparisons. It is not a particularly useful standard for many teas, however, requiring a six-minute brewing time and boiling water, neither of which are recommended for green teas (usually brewed at < 90 °C and for under 3 minutes). Tasters would instead usually taste teas which have been brewed according to the producer's recommendations.

A tea taster uses a large spoon and noisily slurps the liquid into his/her mouth. This ensures that both the tea and plenty of oxygen pass over the taste receptors of the tongue, for an even taste profile. The liquid is then usually expelled into a spittoon before the taster moves to the next sample. A 'cupping set' is used for tasting tea and is always white in colour to allow examination of both liquid and the leaf. The set consists of a small cup with a lid, in which the tea leaves are placed along with the water to brew, and a small, rounded tasting cup. The tea's flavour characteristics and leaf colour, size and shape are graded using a specific language created by the tea industry. Generally speaking, once a tea's quality has been assessed, each tea company places a value on it based on market trends, availability and demand.

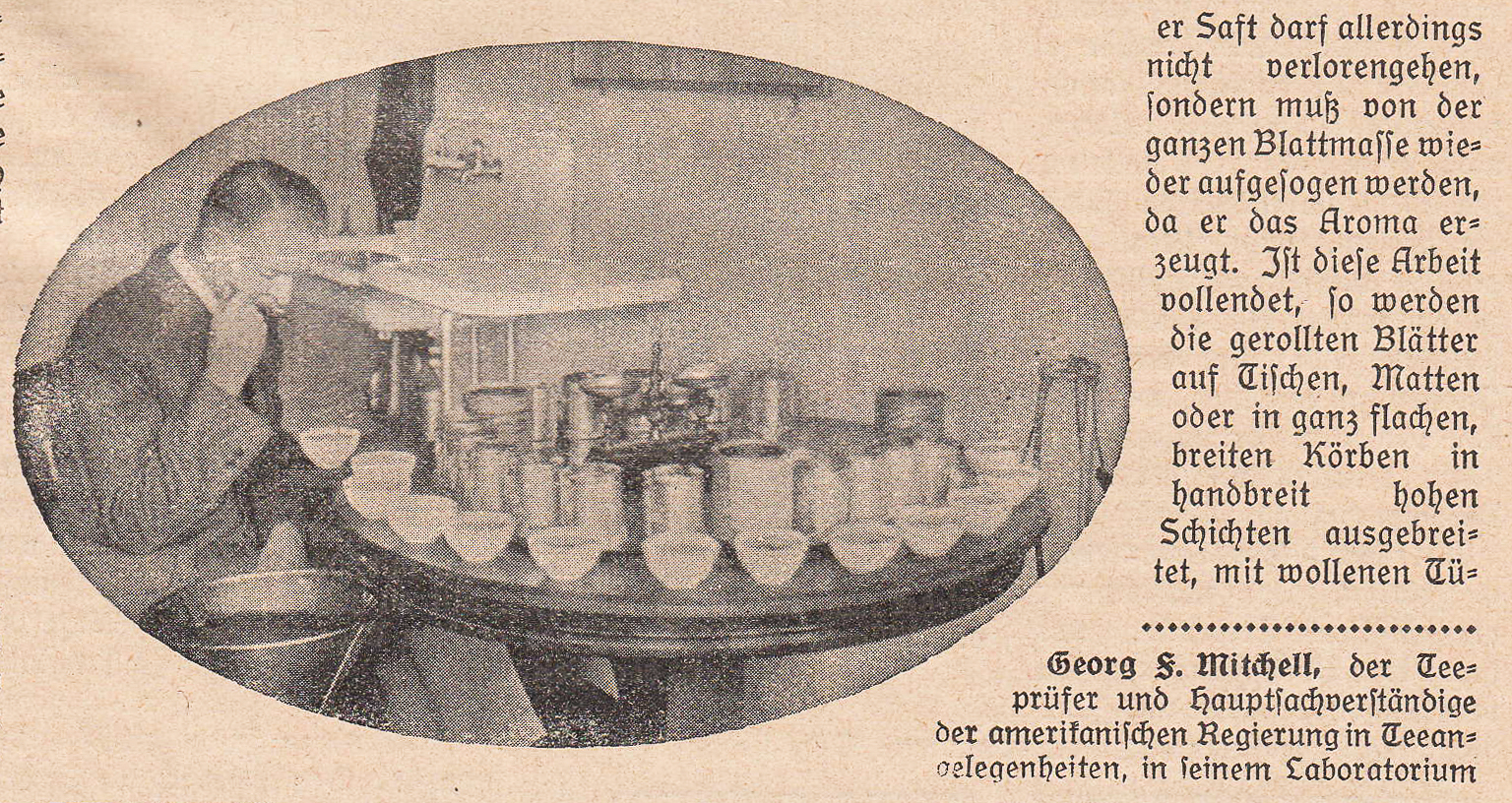
Professional tea-taster George F. Mitchell in 1927

== See also ==
- Tea leaf grading
- Federal Tea Tasters Repeal Act of 1996
- Aroma wheel
- Degustation
- ISO 3103
- Supertaster
- Coffee cupping
- Wine tasting
