= Gunfire (drink) =

British beverage of black tea and rum

- Type: Mixed drink
- Ingredients: 1 cup of black tea 1 shot of rum
- Standard drinkware: Mug
- Served: stirred
- Preparation: Pour the tea into a cup. Pour the rum in and stir.

Gunfire (or gun-fire) is a British caffeinated alcoholic drink, a cocktail made of black tea and rum. It has its origins in the British Army and is also used as a name for early morning tea.

== History ==
=== British Army ===
It is unknown when gunfire was concocted, but it is known that it was mixed by British Army soldiers during the 1890s. Gunfire is served by officers and non-commissioned officers to lower ranks before a morning attack (as a form of Dutch courage) and as a celebration before a Passing out parade. It is also traditionally served to soldiers in their beds by their officers on Christmas Day at reveille if they are deployed over Christmas. Individual regiments may carry out the ritual on other days: for example, in the Royal Tank Regiment gunfire is served on Cambrai Day; in the Queen's Royal Hussars on Balaclava Day and Saint Patrick's Day; and in the Royal Dragoon Guards gunfire made with whiskey on St Patrick's Day.

During the Korean War, members of the American Military Police Corps were given gunfire by British soldiers under the guise of it being normal tea after a recovery mission. This led to intoxication of the MPs who then drove an armoured recovery vehicle and some army jeeps into a camp gate as a result.

=== Australian and New Zealand armies ===
In Australia and New Zealand on ANZAC Day, a version of gunfire with black coffee instead of tea is served to soldiers before dawn services as part of the "gunfire breakfast".

=== Civilians ===
Gunfire has also been made and drunk outside of military circles. Gunfire was served to participants of British reality programme, Bad Lads' Army by the non-commissioned officers before their passing out parade, mirroring the same procedure in the British Army.

Gunfire is also drunk by Australian civilians to commemorate ANZAC Day.

A similar drink, particularly in the German-speaking world is Jagertee.

== Recipe ==
Gunfire consists of one cup of black tea with one shot of rum, which is then stirred in the cup.
