= ISO 3103 =

ISO standardized method for brewing tea

ISO 3103 is a standard published by the International Organization for Standardization (commonly referred to as ISO), specifying a standardized method for brewing tea, possibly sampled by the standardized methods described in ISO 1839. It was originally laid down in 1980 as BS 6008:1980 by the British Standards Institution, and a revision was published in December, 2019 as ISO/NP 3103. It was produced by ISO Technical Committee 34 (Food products), Sub-Committee 8 (Tea).

The abstract states the following:

The method consists in extracting of soluble substances in dried tea leaf, contained in a porcelain or earthenware pot, by means of freshly boiling water, pouring of the liquor into a white porcelain or earthenware bowl, examination of the organoleptic properties of the infused leaf, and of the liquor with or without milk, or both.

This standard is not meant to define the proper method for brewing tea intended for general consumption, but rather to document a tea brewing procedure where meaningful sensory comparisons can be made. An example of such a test would be a taste-test to establish which blend of teas to choose for a particular brand or basic label in order to maintain consistent tasting brewed drink from harvest to harvest.

The work was the winner of the parodic Ig Nobel Prize for Literature in 1999.

Ireland was the only ISO member country to object to the standard, doing so on technical grounds.

== Details ==
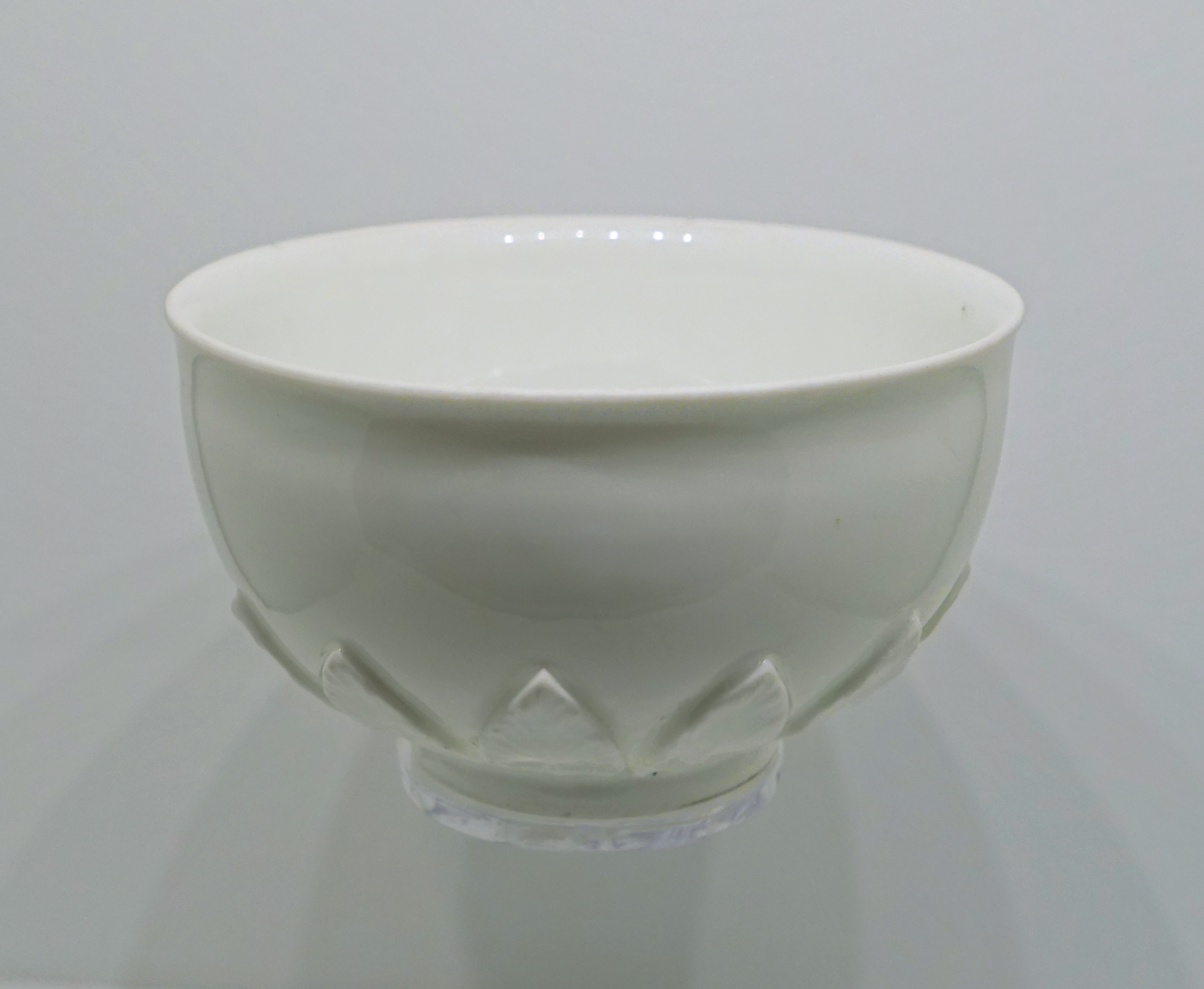
A white porcelain tea bowl

To maintain consistent results, the following are recommendations given by the standard:

- The pot should be white porcelain or glazed earthenware and have a partly serrated edge. It should have a lid that fits loosely inside the pot.
- If a large pot is used, it should hold a maximum of 310 ml (±8 ml) and must weigh 200 g (±10 g).
- If a small pot is used, it should hold a maximum of 150 ml (±4 ml) and must weigh 118 g (±10 g).
- 2 grams of tea (measured to ±2% accuracy) per 100 ml boiling water is placed into the pot.
- Freshly boiling water is poured into the pot to within 4–6 mm of the brim. Allow 20 seconds for water to cool.
- The water should be similar to the drinking water where the tea will be consumed.
- Brewing time is six minutes (for black tea), five minutes (for leafy green tea) and three minutes (for fanning green tea).
- The brewed tea is then poured into a white porcelain or glazed earthenware bowl.
- If a large bowl is used, it must have a capacity of 380 ml and weigh 200 g (±20 g).
- If a small bowl is used, it must have a capacity of 200 ml and weigh 105 g (±20 g).
- If the test involves milk, then it is added to the bowl before pouring the infused tea into it, unless that is contrary to the organisation's normal practice, which may itself be contrary to societal norms.
- If milk is added after the pouring of tea, the standard notes that best results are obtained when the liquid is between 65 and 80 °C.
- 5 ml of milk for the large bowl, or 2.5 ml for the small bowl, is used.

== Pot and bowl ==
An annex of the standard describes two alternative pots (310 ml and 150 ml) and corresponding bowls (380 ml and 200 ml) "which are in widespread use" for tea tasting, including engineering drawings of their cross sections. The type of pot described is also known as a taster's mug.

== Competing standards ==
In 2003, the Royal Society of Chemistry published a press release entitled "How to make a Perfect Cup of Tea".

== See also ==
- Hyper Text Coffee Pot Control Protocol
- A Nice Cup of Tea
- Steeping
- Tea tasting, the professional practice of tea sampling for flavour characteristics
- Teapot, a traditional vessel for brewing and serving tea
