= Tea blending and additives =

Blending different teas together

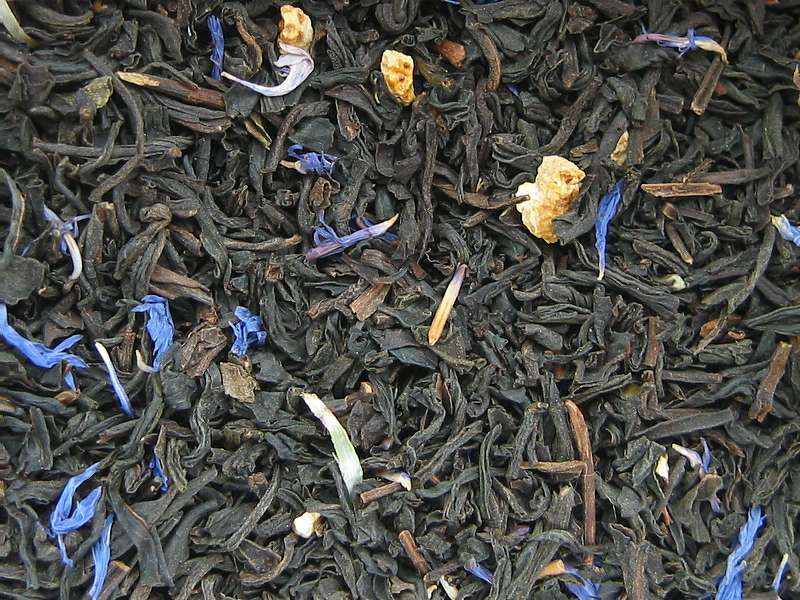
Twinings Lady Grey tea which is a flavored tea blend containing bergamot oil, citrus peels and flowers

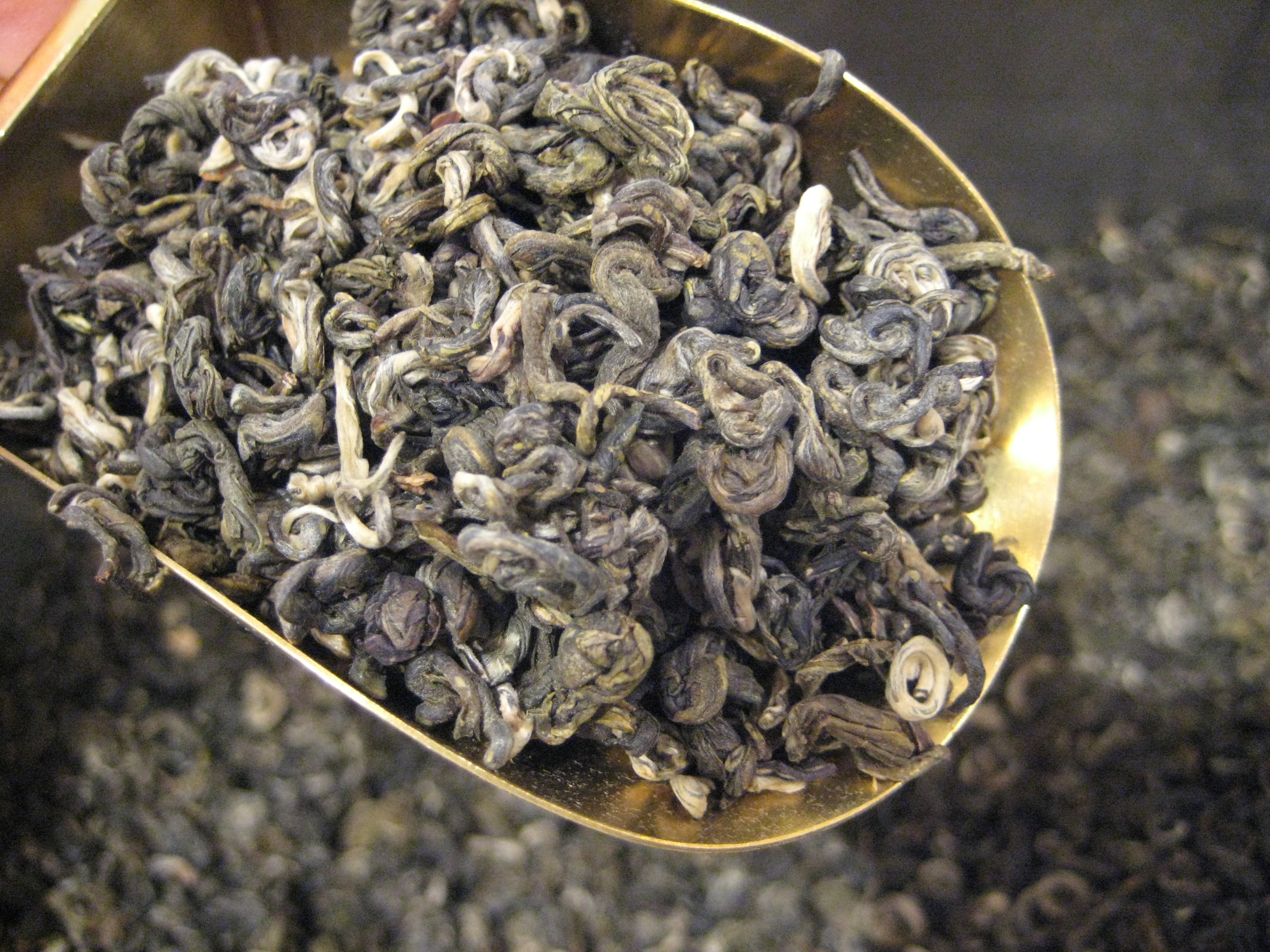
Chinese Jasmine tea, a popular scented tea in East Asia. The tea leaves are scented with jasmine flowers. Traditionally, the flowers are not included in the final blend, which retains the scent in the leaves.

Tea blending is the act of blending different teas (and sometimes other products) to produce a final product that differs in flavor from the original tea used. This occurs chiefly with black tea, which is blended to make most tea bags, but it can also occur with such teas as Pu-erh, where leaves are blended from different regions before being compressed. The most prominent type of tea blending is commercial tea blending, which is used to ensure consistency of a batch on a mass scale so that any variations between different batches and seasons of tea production do not affect the final product. Commercially, it is considered important that any batch of a particular blend must taste the same as the previous batch, so a consumer will not be able to detect a difference in flavor from one purchase to the next.

Another common practice is to scent tea leaves or blend tea leaves with herbs, fruits or spices, either for health purposes or to add interesting and more complex aromas and flavor notes. These kinds of teas are usually termed "scented tea" (especially when the tea leaves are only scented with certain aromas) or "flavored teas" (particularly when additives like flowers, oils, bits of fruit, flavorings, or other herbs are blended in with the tea leaves to be infused together). Another method of flavoring tea leaves is to smoke them in various ways, such as the pinewood smoking used for lapsang souchong.

Because tea takes on aromas with ease, there can be problems in the processing, transportation or storage of tea, but this property can also be consciously used to prepare flavored teas. Commercial flavored tea is often flavored in large blending drums with perfumes, flavorings, or essential oils. Although blending and scenting teas can add an additional dimension to tea, the process may also sometimes be used to cover and obscure the quality of sub-standard teas.

== Varieties of blended tea ==
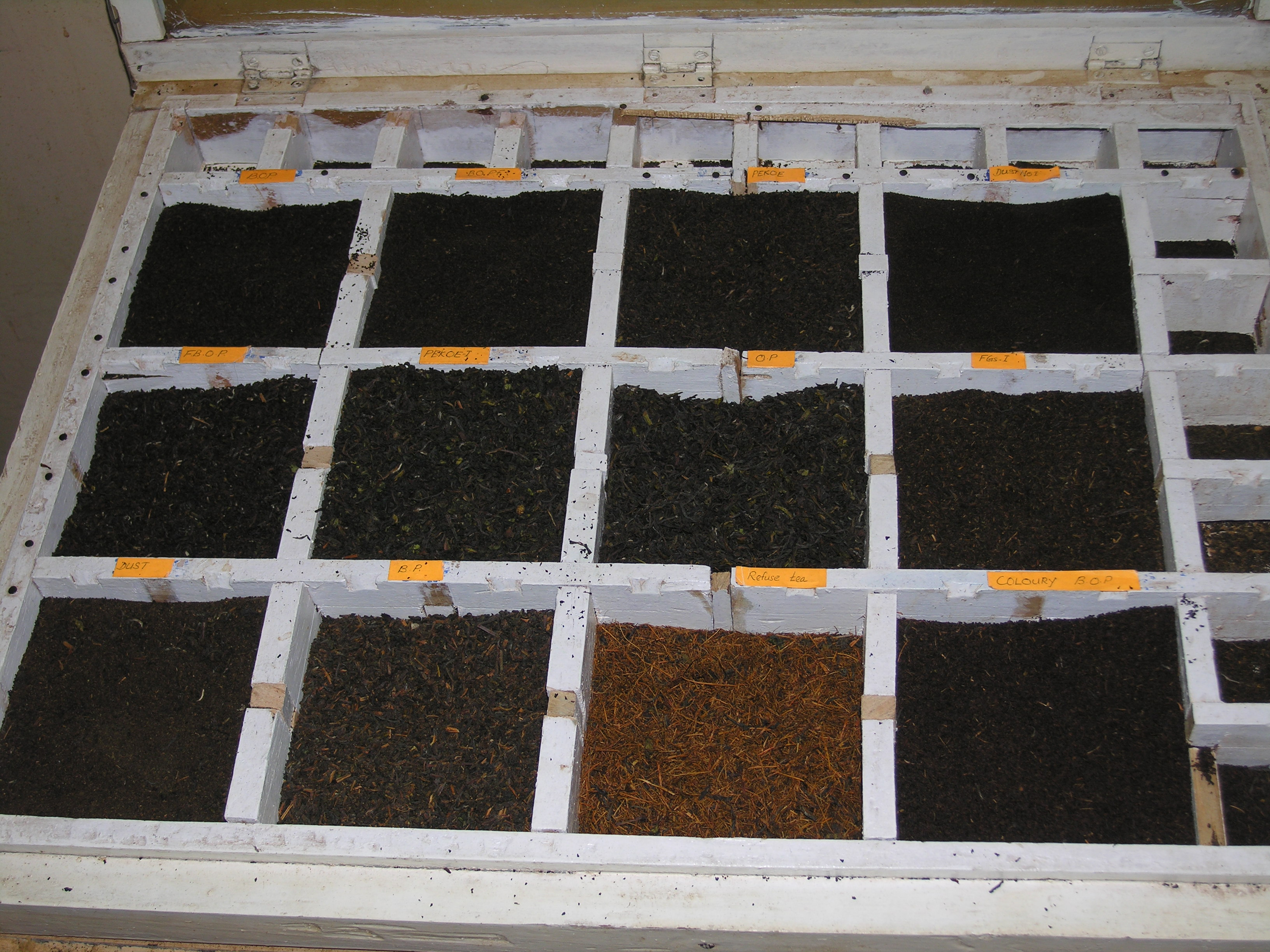
Black tea sorted by characteristic and quality in a sample tray at a Sri Lankan tea factory. Various whole dried leaves, partial leaves, and tea dusts are used in combination to produce different types of blended teas

Breakfast
Breakfast teas are generally a blend of different robust, full-bodied black teas that are often drunk with milk. Common types of breakfast tea include English breakfast, Irish breakfast and Scottish breakfast.
Afternoon tea
Afternoon blends of black teas are generally lighter than breakfast blends. Both breakfast and afternoon blends are popular in the British Isles; an example would be the Prince of Wales tea blend.
Russian Caravan
Russian Caravan is a popular blend that originates from the tea trade between Russia and China. It usually contains a bit of smoky lapsang souchong, though its base is typically Keemun or Dian Hong. Some variants also contain oolong.
East Frisian Blend
The traditional East Frisian tea blend dates to the 18th century and consists mostly of Assam, Ceylon, and Java teas.

== Flavored and scented teas ==
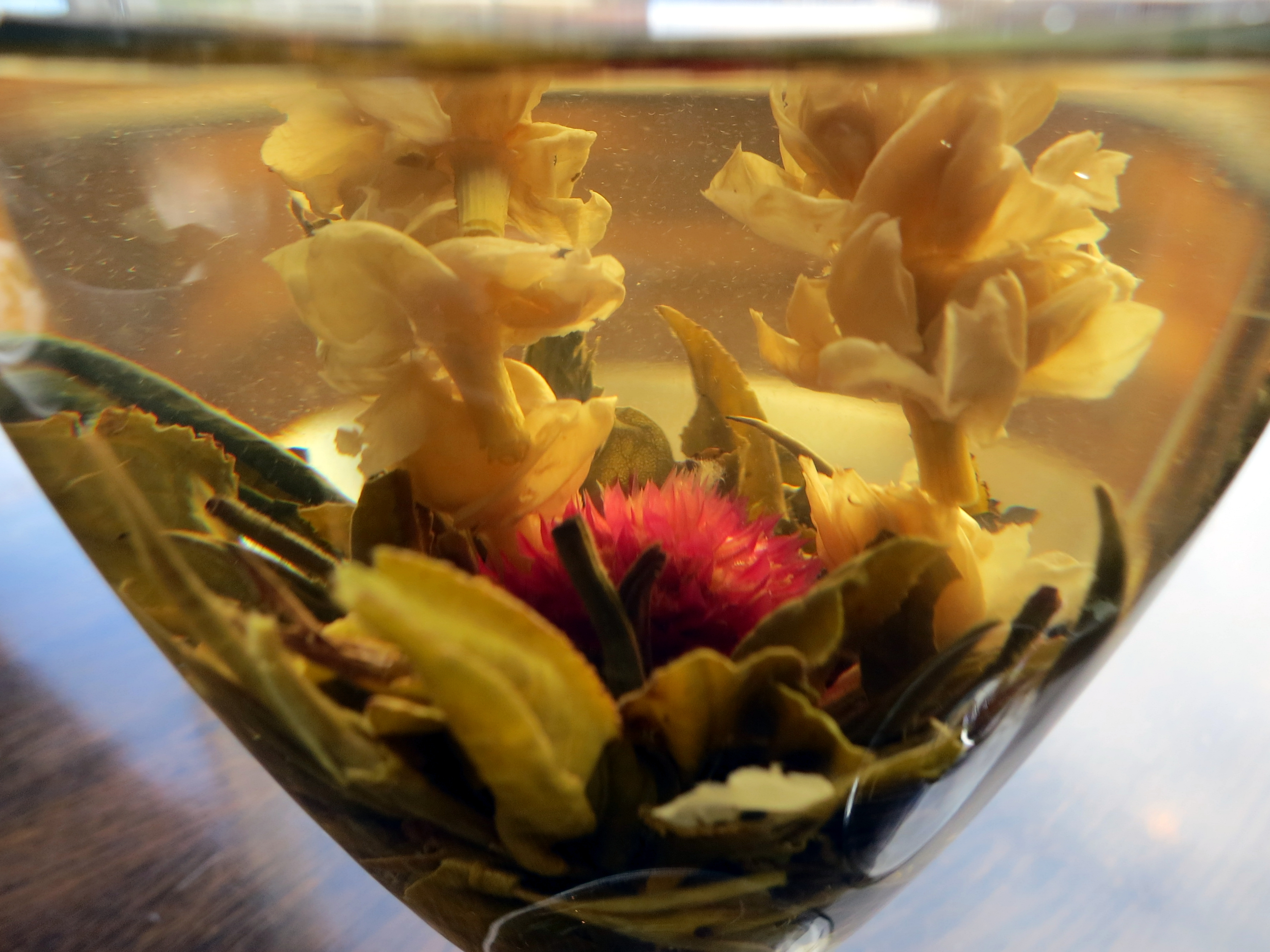
A Flowering tea, green tea with jasmine flowers.

Teas blended with other additives were developed in ancient China. As far back as the Jin dynasty (266–420), ground up tea leaves were boiled with scallions, ginger, and orange peels as reported in the Guangya dictionary (c. 3rd century CE). During the Tang dynasty, tea was often blended with flowers. During the Song era (960 to 1279), the most expensive tea, called wax tea, was often covered with aromatic ointments, like Borneo camphor. In the Qing dynasty (1644–1912), the Manchus popularized scented teas, such as jasmine tea and teas scented with cloranthus, cassia, honeysuckle, and rose.

Although many teas are still scented or flavored directly with flowers, herbs, spices, or even smoke, teas with more specialized flavors are usually produced through the addition of flavorings or perfumes. This is particularly true for tea blends with pronounced fruit or flower aromas, which cannot be achieved with the original ingredients. Some firms such as Mariage Frères and Kusmi Tea have become quite famous for their perfumed teas. The most commonly used scents are jasmine, traditionally used to scent delicate white and green teas, and bergamot, which is used to scent Earl Grey tea. The teas described below are flavored directly with other materials.

=== Flowers ===
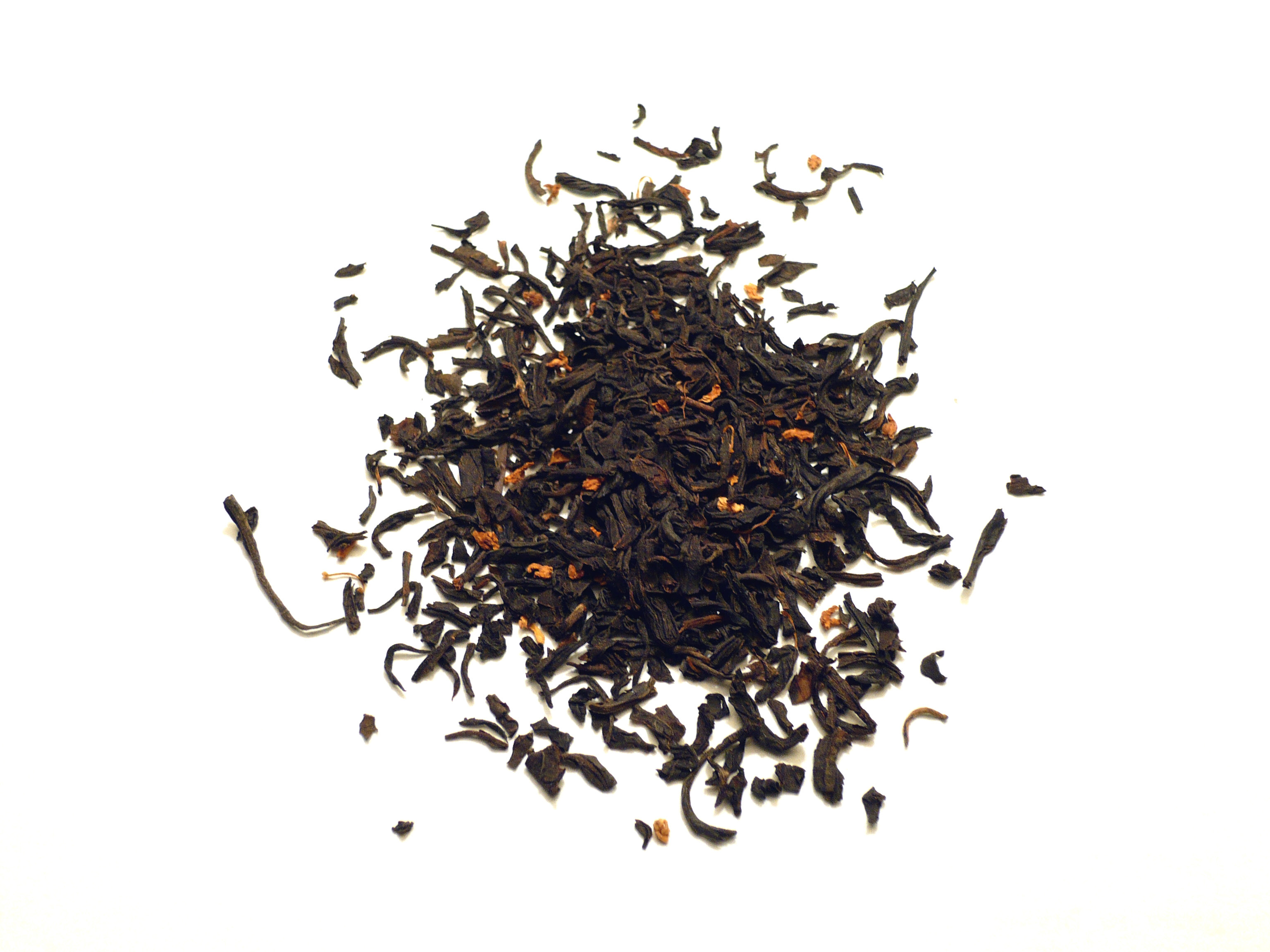
Chinese osmanthus black tea

A variety of flowers are used to flavor teas. Although flowers can be used to scent teas directly, most flower-scented teas on the market use perfumes and aromas to augment or replace the use of flowers. The most popular flower teas include the following:

- Jasmine: Tea can be spread with jasmine flowers while oxidizing to give it a floral flavor; occasionally some are left in the tea as a decoration. Jasmine is most commonly used to flavor green teas to produce jasmine tea, although sometimes it is used to flavor light oolong teas such as baozhong tea.
- Osmanthus: In China, osmanthus tea (called guì huā chá, 桂花茶) is produced by combining dried sweet osmanthus (Osmanthus fragrans) flowers (guì huā, 桂花) with black or green tea leaves in much the same manner as jasmine tea is flavored. The flower gives the tea a mild peachy flavor. It is the second most popular scented tea in China, after jasmine.

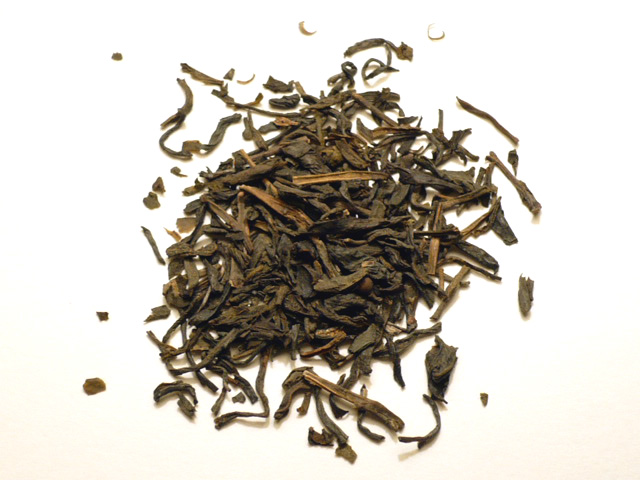
Vietnamese lotus green tea

- Rose: Similar to jasmine, tea can be spread with rose flowers while oxidizing. Rose petals can also be left in the tea as a decoration. In China, roses are usually used to scent black tea; the resulting tea is called rose congou.
- Chrysanthemum: The flowers are often brewed alone to create a chrysanthemum tisane, but they are also commonly mixed with pu-erh tea to make chrysanthemum pu-erh.
- Lotus: Vietnamese lotus tea is made by stuffing green tea leaves into the blossom of Nelumbo nucifera and allowing the scent to be absorbed overnight. Another common technique for making this tea is by jarring or baking the tea leaves with the fragrant stamens of the flower multiple times.
- Orchid: The most commonly used orchid species in tea is vanilla.
- Magnolia: Again, magnolia scented teas are produced using a similar method as jasmine teas. The flowers impart a rich, sweet, floral, and fruity aroma and flavor. Today the most common magnolia scented tea found for sale is a magnolia jade oolong using Tieguanyin or a similar variety of oolong.

=== Herbs ===
- Mint: Maghrebi mint tea, or Moroccan mint tea, consists of a mixture of green teas and any variety of the mint plants (known as nana), and is popular in the Middle East and desert areas of North Africa. Many types of mint are also sometimes used in modern commercial tea blends, like peppermint and spearmint. Mint can also be brewed on its own to create a mint herbal tea.
- Pandan: Pandan, also known as screwpine, is a popular additive to green or black tea in Malaysia, Indonesia, and the Philippines.
- Sticky rice plant (Nuo Mi Ye): The leaves of the sticky rice plant (Strobilanthes tonkinensis) are often used to scent teas. The tea most commonly scented with nuo mi ye today is ripe, shóu, pu-er. The sticky rice puer is usually pressed into and sold as xiǎo tuóchá, a 3-5 gram dome shaped single serving tea cake.

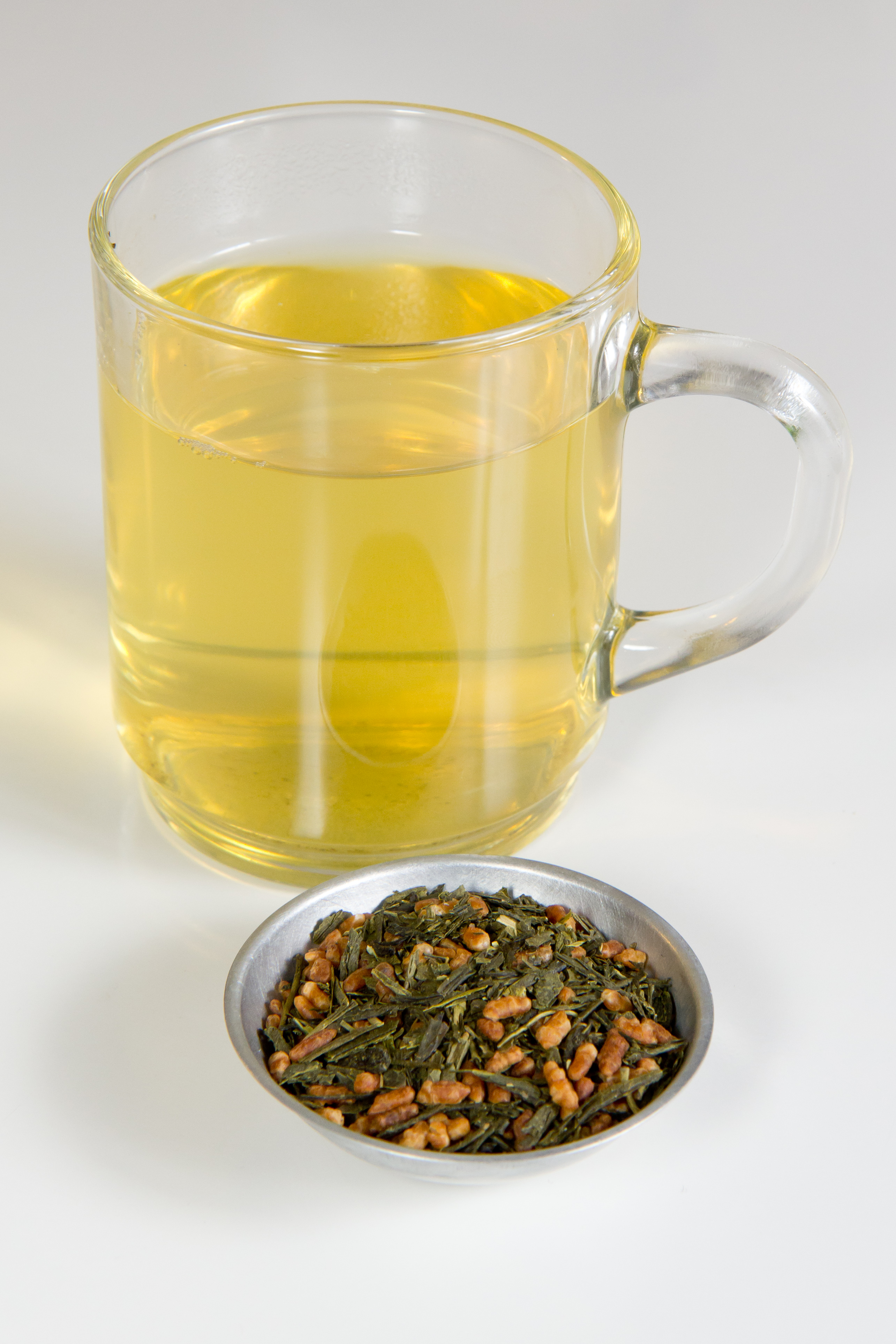
Brewed and unbrewed genmaicha

- Citrus peel: The best known citrus-flavored tea is Earl Grey, which is made by infusing black teas with bergamot peel. More typically, however, an essential oil or perfume blend of the citrus fruit is used. Lady Grey differs from Earl Grey in that it contains additional lemon peel and orange peel.
- Ginseng: Teas blended with ginseng are popular in China, where ginseng is an important root in Traditional Chinese Medicine
- Berries: Teas blended with dried blackcurrants were common in the Victorian era and are still sold today. Various other tea blends containing different berries (either dried fruit or flavoring agents), like lychee, are sold commercially today.
- Fruit: Other fruits or fruit flavorings (such as mango or peach) are also commonly blended with teas
- Roasted grain: Genmaicha is a popular Japanese green tea with roasted rice added. Korean hyeonmi-nokcha is another type of brown rice green tea. Wheat and barley are also used to blend with tea.
- Smoke: One type in this class is lapsang souchong, which is produced by drying black tea over smoking pine needles. This process gives it a striking smoky odor and flavor. The best varieties are not overwhelmed by the smoke, but retain subtlety and a mix of other flavors. Lapsang souchong is found in many Russian Caravan blends.
- Multiple South Asian spices: Tea blends such as the Indian Masala chai and Middle Eastern Kahwah are flavored with multiple spices such as ginger, cardamom, cinnamon, cassia, black pepper, clove, anise, fennel, Indian bay leaf and sometimes vanilla, nutmeg and mace.
- Rum: Jagertee is a tea with rum added.

== See also ==
- ISO 3103
- Tea leaf grading
