= Whale (disambiguation) =

A whale is a sea mammal.

Whale or The Whale may also refer to:

== Places ==
=== Extraterrestrial ===
- Cetus, a constellation also known as "The Whale"
- Belton Regio on Pluto, unofficially nicknamed the Whale

=== United Kingdom ===
- Whale, Cumbria, England, a hamlet
- Whale Island, Hampshire, England

=== United States ===
- Whale Cove (Oregon)
- Whale Lake, Minnesota
- Whale Rock, Rhode Island

=== Elsewhere ===
- Bay of Whales, Ross Ice Shelf, Antarctica
- Whale Cove, Nunavut, Canada
- Whale Island, the English name of Moutohora Island in New Zealand
- Whale Island, an island in the Torres Strait, Australia
- Whale Sound, Greenland

== People ==
- Whale (surname)
- Brian Roberts (Australian rules footballer), an Australian football player known as "The Whale"

== Arts and entertainment ==
=== Fictional entities ===
- Whale (improbable), a minor character in The Hitchhiker's Guide to the Galaxy
- W.H.A.L.E., a fictional vehicle in the G.I. Joe universe
- Tannin (monster), a Levantine sea monster translated as "whale" in the King James Version of the Bible
- Tobias Whale, a comic book villain
- Dale "The Whale" Biederbeck, a character from Monk

=== Films ===
- Whale (film), a 1970 Bulgarian comedy satirizing the defects of the Bulgarian economic and social structure
- The Whale (2011 film), a 2011 documentary film about a killer whale (orca) living in Nootka Sound, Canada
- The Whale (2013 film), a 2013 BBC television film about the Essex whaleship and its sinking in 1820
- The Whale (2022 film), a drama film directed by Darren Aronofsky and starring Brendan Fraser and based on the 2012 play
- A Whale (film), a 2024 neo-noir fantasy thriller film

=== Literature ===
- "The Whale" (poem), an Old English poem
- The Whale (play), a 2012 stage play by Samuel D. Hunter
- Moby-Dick or The Whale, an 1851 novel by Herman Melville
- Whale (novel), a 2004 novel by Cheon Myeong-kwan

=== Music ===
- Whale (band), a Swedish alternative pop rock band
- "Whale" (song), by Catatonia, 1994
- "The Whale" (Tavener), a dramatic cantata by John Tavener
- "Whale", a song by Alchemist from Jar of Kingdom
- "Whales", a song by Scale the Summit from The Collective
- "The Whale", an instrumental by Electric Light Orchestra from Out of the Blue

=== Radio ===
- KAGT, previously branded as The Whale, an Abilene, Texas radio station
- WAAL, branded as 99.1 The Whale, a New York radio station
- WBHU, previously branded as 105.5 The Whale, a St. Augustine Beach, Florida radio station
- WDRC-FM, branded as 102.9 The Whale, a Hartford, Connecticut radio station

=== Other uses in arts and entertainment ===
- "The Whale" (The Office), an episode of the US TV series The Office
- Whale (sculpture), an outdoor wooden sculpture in Cannon Beach, Oregon, US

== Military ==
- USS Whale, ships of the US Navy
- Douglas A-3 Skywarrior, a carrier-based aircraft nicknamed "The Whale"
- Operation Whale, two aborted World War II-era German intelligence plans
- Soviet submarine S-99, the only ship of the experimental Whale class submarine

== Sports ==
- Chicago Whales, a professional baseball team in the Federal League in 1914 and 1915
- Connecticut Whale, a former American Hockey League team, now called the Hartford Wolf Pack
- Hartford Whalers, a former NHL franchise nicknamed "The Whale"
- Ingalls Rink, Yale University, an ice hockey rink commonly referred to as "The Whale"
- Irish Whales or "The Whales", nickname of a group of Irish and Irish-American athletes who dominated weight-throwing events in the early 20th century

== Other uses ==
- Whale (computer virus), a malicious program
- Whale (ship), a sloop which disappeared in 1816
- A Whale (ship), a Liberian-flagged ore-oil carrier ship
- Whale (gambling) or high roller, a gambler who consistently wagers large amounts of money
- Naver Whale, a Web browser
- The Whale (Figure Eight Island), a beach house in North Carolina
- The Whale, a housing project by Danish West 8
- Waterfront Historic Area League (WHALE)

== See also ==
- Wael, an Arabic surname
- Wail (disambiguation)
- Wale (disambiguation)
- Wales (disambiguation)
- Wales, a country of the United Kingdom
