= Prince of Wales (disambiguation) =

Prince of Wales is a British royal title.

Prince of Wales may also refer to:

== People ==
- List of princes of Wales, including
  - Charles III (born 1948; r. 2022–present), King of the United Kingdom; Prince of Wales from 1958 to 2022
  - William, Prince of Wales (born 1982), Prince of Wales since 2022
- Richie Burnett (born 1967), Welsh darts player nicknamed Prince of Wales
- Midpul (1935–2002), Aboriginal Australian artist, winner of the 2001 NATSIAA General Painting Award, also known as the "Prince of Wales"

== Beverages ==
- Prince of Wales (cocktail)
- Prince of Wales tea blend

== Military ==
- HMS Prince of Wales, various Royal Navy ships
- Prince of Wales's Division, a British Army infantry division
- Prince of Wales's Regiment (disambiguation), various regiments

== Places ==
- Prince of Wales Hospital (disambiguation), various hospitals
- Prince of Wales Theatre (disambiguation), various theatres

=== Australia ===
- Prince Of Wales, Queensland
  - Prince of Wales Island (Queensland), an island within the locality

=== Canada ===
- Prince of Wales Hotel, Waterton Park, Alberta
- Prince of Wales Range (Canada), in British Columbia
- Prince of Wales Secondary School, Vancouver, British Columbia
- Prince of Wales Fort, Churchill, Manitoba
- Prince of Wales, New Brunswick
- Prince of Wales Strait, Northwest Territories
- Prince of Wales Island (Nunavut)
- Prince of Wales Mountains, Nunavut
- Prince of Wales Public School (Barrie), Ontario
- Chief William Commanda Bridge, Ottawa, Ontario and Gatineau, Quebec; formerly the Prince of Wales Bridge

=== India ===
- HRH The Prince of Wales Institute of Engineering and Technology, Jorhat, Assam

=== United Kingdom ===
- Prince of Wales, Euston, London, England
- Prince of Wales, Highgate, London, England
- Prince of Wales Colliery, Pontefract, West Yorkshire, England
- Prince of Wales Bridge, England and Wales

=== United States ===
- Cape Prince of Wales, Alaska; the westernmost mainland point of North America
- Prince of Wales Island (Alaska)

== Sports ==
- Eastern Conference (NHL), formerly called the Prince of Wales Conference
- Prince of Wales F.C., a former Gibraltarian football club
- Prince of Wales Trophy, an award presented by the National Hockey League
- Prince of Wales Trophy (polo), a British polo tournament

== Transportation ==
=== Locomotives ===
- LNER P2 Class 2007 Prince of Wales, a steam locomotive
- LNWR Prince of Wales Class, an express passenger locomotive
- Prince of Wales, a type of GCR Class 11F locomotive
- Prince of Wales, a type of LB&SCR B4 class locomotive
- Prince of Wales, a Vale of Rheidol Railway locomotive

=== Ships ===
- Prince of Wales (EIC ship), various East India Company ships
- Prince of Wales (ship), various ships
- Prince of Wales, a ship that sank in Dublin Bay in 1807

== Other uses ==
- Glen plaid, also called the Prince of Wales check

== See also ==
- Charles, Prince of Wales (disambiguation)
- Chhatrapati Shivaji Maharaj Vastu Sangrahalaya, Mumbai, India; formerly called Prince of Wales Museum of Western India
- Princess of Wales (disambiguation)
  - Catherine, Princess of Wales (born 1982), Princess of Wales since 2022
- Principality of Wales
- Wales (disambiguation)
