= Wale =

Wale or WALE may refer to:

== Places ==
- Wale, Devon, a hamlet in England
- Wale, Poland, a village in Poland

== People ==
- Wale (surname)
- Wale (rapper), stage name of American rapper Olubowale Victor Akintimehin

== Radio and television stations ==
- WALE-LD, a low-power television station (channel 16, virtual 17) licensed to serve Montgomery, Alabama, United States
- WBHU 105.5 FM, a radio station licensed to St. Augustine Beach, Florida, United States, which held the call sign WALE in 2014
- WALE (Rhode Island) 990 AM, a defunct radio station licensed to Providence and later Greenville, Rhode Island, United States that held the WALE callsign from 1989 until its deletion on April 1, 2014
- WHTB 1440 AM, a radio station licensed to Fall River, Massachusetts that held the callsign WALE until 1989

== Other uses ==
- Wale (ship part), a plank around the outside of a ship
- Wale (film), a 2018 short film
- Wale, welt or wheal, a type of skin lesion
- Wale, a term used to express cord width for corduroy materials
- HSwMS Wale, a Royal Swedish Navy destroyer

== See also ==
- Wales (disambiguation)
- Whale (disambiguation)
- Wail (disambiguation)
- Wael, Arabic surname
