= Princess of Wales (disambiguation) =

Princess of Wales is a British royal title.

Princess of Wales may also refer to:

- List of princesses of Wales, including
  - Diana, Princess of Wales (1961–1997), Princess of Wales from 1981 to 1996
  - Catherine, Princess of Wales (born 1982), Princess of Wales since 2022
- Princess of Wales (ship), various ships
- Princess of Wales Bridge, Stockton-on-Tees, England, United Kingdom
- Princess of Wales' College, Moratuwa, Sri Lanka
- Princess of Wales Hospital, Ely, England, United Kingdom
- Princess of Wales Hospital, Bridgend, Wales, United Kingdom
- Princess of Wales Theatre, Toronto, Ontario, Canada
- Princess of Wales' Own Regiment, a Canadian Army regiment
- Princess of Wales's Royal Regiment, a British Army regiment
- Princess of Wales's Stakes, a British horse race
- Rosa 'Princess of Wales', a white garden rose

== See also ==
- Diana, Princess of Wales Hospital, Grimsby, England, United Kingdom
- Diana, Princess of Wales Memorial Fountain, London, England, United Kingdom
- Prince of Wales (disambiguation)
  - William, Prince of Wales (born 1982), Prince of Wales since 2022
- Principality of Wales
- Rosa 'Diana, Princess of Wales', a pink garden rose
- Wales (disambiguation)
