= Prince of Wales Theatre (disambiguation) =

Prince of Wales Theatre is a theatre in the West End of London.

Prince of Wales Theatre may also refer to:

== Australia ==
- Prince of Wales Theatre, Sydney, New South Wales
- Her Majesty's Theatre, Adelaide, South Australia; called Prince of Wales Theatre from 1920 to 1930
- Prince of Wales Theatre, Hobart, Tasmania
- Prince of Wales Theatre, Melbourne, Victoria

== United Kingdom ==
- Scala Theatre, Fitzrovia, London, England; called Prince of Wales's Theatre from 1865 to 1882
- Prince of Wales Theatre, Cardiff, Wales

== See also ==
- Prince of Wales (disambiguation)
