= Prince of Wales tea blend =

Blend of black teas popular in Britain

Prince of Wales tea blend is a blend of Keemun tea, gunpowder green tea, and a dash of currant juice or infused with dried currants. This produces a full-bodied cup with a bright liquor and strong aroma. It was named after Edward, Prince of Wales, who held that title from 1911 until 1936.

The blend was originally devised for Edward, Prince of Wales (later King Edward VIII and after his abdication, the Duke of Windsor).

== History ==
Prince Edward first granted Twinings permission to sell his personal blend using his royal title in 1921. Although Twinings has largely withdrawn its Prince of Wales tea from the United Kingdom market, it is still offered abroad, according to Twinings's official regional websites. On its American packaging Twinings stated that

Prince of Wales is a pure China black tea sourced from regions including the Yunnan province and other southern regions of China. This blend is light in color and has a smooth and mild taste, with a well-rounded character. Great in the late morning or in the afternoon, it is perfect with or without milk and can be sweetened to taste.

However, this is a curious change to the supposed historical fact given on Twining's old Prince of Wales tea tins which read :

A blend of carefully selected finest Keemun black teas considered by connoisseurs to be one of the finest Chinese teas.

As with many tea blends, such as Earl Grey and English breakfast, there is no set formula for what teas go into a Prince of Wales blend. Many tea companies now produce blends with this name. In Germany, the Paul Schrader GmbH & Co. KG Bremen (founded in 1921) has offered a version since 1958 consisting of Chinese black teas and Darjeeling with a pinch of Lapsang souchong.
