= Elegant Lady =

Elegant Lady may refer to:

- A river cruise ship built in 2003, see List of river cruise ships
- Rosa 'Diana, Princess of Wales', garden rose cultivar also known as Elegant Lady
- Graphium hachei, a butterfly also known as Elegant Lady
