= Prince of Wales Public School =

Prince of Wales Public School may refer to various schools in Ontario, Canada:

- Prince of Wales Public School (Barrie), an elementary school 1876–2011
- Prince of Wales Elementary school, Belleville, Ontario
- Prince of Wales Public School (Brockville), an elementary school in Brockville, Ontario
- Prince of Wales Public School (Peterborough, Ontario), JK–8
- Prince of Wales Elementary School, Hamilton, Ontario

== See also ==
- Prince of Wales School (Freetown, Sierra Leone), a secondary school in Freetown, Sierra Leone
- Nairobi School, formerly known as Prince of Wales School, a secondary school in Nairobi, Kenya
- Prince of Wales Secondary School, a public secondary school in Vancouver, British Columbia, Canada
