= Russian Caravan =

Blend of black teas transported by caravans

Russian Caravan is a blend of oolong, keemun, and lapsang souchong teas. It is described as an aromatic and full-bodied tea with a sweet, malty, and smoky taste. Some varieties do not include lapsang souchong, and thus have a less smoky flavor, while others include Assam tea. Traditionally the smoky character was considered to have been imparted to the tea by the close proximity of the camel caravans to countless camp fires en route across the Mongolian steppes to Russia.

Although a Chinese tea, its name originates from the 18th century camel caravans that facilitated the transcontinental tea trade from tea-producing areas (namely India, Ceylon and China) to Europe via Russia, along the Siberian Route. "It took at least half a year to make the six-thousand-mile journey from the Chinese border to the populated regions of European Russia, and the voyage was harsh."

The southern route by Odessa is far cheaper, but the tea is supposed to suffer in flavour in its transit through the tropical seas, while it improves in its passage through the cold dry climate of Mongolia and Siberia, by losing that unpleasant taste of firing [whereby tea was dried using direct heat]. As Russian epicures believe that a peculiar delicacy of flavor is imparted to it by the slight moisture it absorbs when nightly unloaded and placed on the snow-covered steppes, the enhanced price it commands compensates for the greater expense and difficulty of its carriage by this route.

Some blends use Yunnan black tea, together with keemun and lapsang souchong, to achieve full-bodied, strong copper-colored, smoky, and heavy-flavored tea with a smooth and mellow aftertaste.
