= Jasmine tea =

Scented tea made by infusing tea leaves with jasmine blossoms

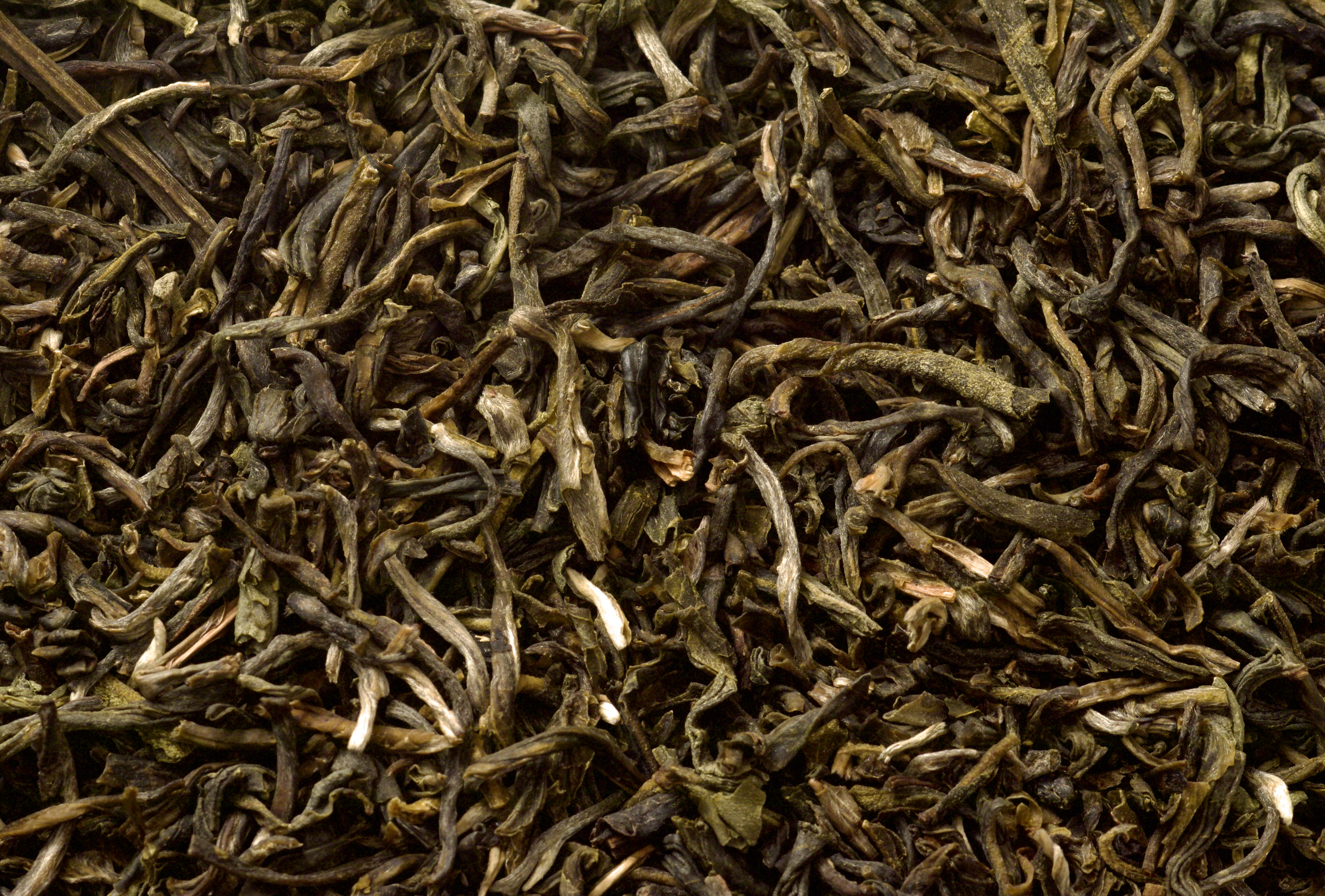
- Chinese: 茉莉花茶, 香片
Transcriptions
Standard Mandarin
- Hanyu Pinyin: mòlìhuā chá, xiāng piàn

Jasmine tea (Chinese: 茉莉花茶; pinyin: mòlìhuā chá or Chinese: 香片; pinyin: xiāng piàn) is a scented tea produced by infusing a tea base — most commonly green tea, though white tea, oolong, and black tea are also used — with the natural fragrance of jasmine blossoms. The resulting flavour is subtly sweet and highly fragrant. It is the most famous scented tea in China and has been consumed across Asia for centuries.

An important distinction exists between naturally scented jasmine tea — in which fresh jasmine flowers transfer their fragrance directly into dry tea leaves through a layered absorption process — and artificially flavoured jasmine tea, in which leaves are coated or sprayed with synthetic jasmine essence. Naturally scented tea is considered superior in aroma complexity and overall quality. Today jasmine tea is produced across Asia, with significant traditions in China, Japan, and Vietnam; Vietnamese production is particularly noted for its preservation of traditional natural scenting methods.

The jasmine plant is believed to have been introduced into China from eastern South Asia via India during the Han dynasty (206 BC to 220 AD), and was being used to scent tea around the fifth century. Jasmine tea did not become widespread until the Qing dynasty (1644 to 1912 AD), when tea began to be exported in large quantities to the West. Today it remains a common beverage served in tea shops around the world.

The jasmine plant is typically grown at high elevations. Jasmine tea produced in the Chinese province of Fujian has the best reputation in China. It is also produced in the provinces of Hunan, Jiangsu, Jiangxi, Guangdong, Guangxi, and Zhejiang. Japan is known for its jasmine tea production as well, especially in Okinawa Prefecture, where it is called Sanpin-cha (さんぴん茶). Vietnam has also developed a significant jasmine tea tradition, producing naturally scented teas from tea-growing regions such as Thái Nguyên, Hà Giang, and Lâm Đồng.

== Botanical characteristics of the jasmine flower ==
The jasmine flower most commonly used in tea production is Jasminum sambac (L.) Aiton, known for its pure white petals and intensely aromatic scent. In Vietnam, a prized cultivar known as lài quế (cinnamon jasmine), grown in Sóc Sơn, Hà Nội, is valued for its smaller, single-petalled blossoms whose fragrance is considered more refined and intense than that of larger-flowered varieties. The jasmine flower blooms most abundantly between April and September.

== Preparation ==
=== Flower harvest ===
Tea leaves are typically harvested in the early spring and stored until the late summer when fresh jasmine flowers are in bloom. Jasmine flowers are picked early in the day — traditionally around noon on a sunny day — when the small petals are still tightly closed. Flowers harvested immediately after rain are considered less desirable, as the blooms hold less aromatic intensity.

The flowers are kept cool until nightfall. During the night, jasmine flowers open naturally, releasing their fragrance at peak intensity. Traditional tea makers wait until approximately 9:00 PM, when the blossoms have just begun to unfurl, before combining them with the dry tea leaves. Harvesting at the wrong time — either too early (tight, tiny buds) or too late (fully open blooms) — is known to reduce the quality of fragrance transfer.

=== Scenting process ===
There are two main methods used to scent tea with jasmine. In one method, the tea and flowers are placed in alternating layers; in the other, the tea is blended with jasmine flowers and stored overnight. In the traditional layering approach, a layer of dry tea is spread out, followed by a layer of fresh flowers, then tea again — this pattern is repeated until all the material is used. The entire arrangement is covered and left to rest for approximately 20 to 24 hours, during which the tea leaves absorb the natural fragrance released by the opening blossoms. It takes over four hours for the tea to absorb the fragrance and flavour of the jasmine blossoms.

After scenting, the flowers are carefully separated from the tea, which is then dried to remove moisture absorbed during the process. The active fragrance-holding window of a fresh jasmine blossom is approximately 10 to 12 hours, making timing and speed essential throughout production.

=== Multiple scenting rounds ===
The scenting process may be repeated as many as six or seven times for top grades such as Yin Hao. Premium Vietnamese jasmine teas typically undergo three to four rounds. Each round uses fresh flowers and builds greater aromatic depth and complexity. A single round of scenting produces only a light floral note; multiple rounds create a layered fragrance that cannot be achieved in one pass. This repetition is a principal reason that high-quality loose-leaf jasmine tea commands a significantly higher price than lower-grade alternatives.

=== Tea base selection ===
The quality of the tea base has a significant bearing on the finished product. In Vietnamese production, premium jasmine tea is commonly built on Thái Nguyên green tea, particularly from the Tân Cương region, which is regarded as the source of the country's finest green tea. The plucking standard for premium tea is typically one bud and one young leaf, which ensures tenderness and the capacity to absorb floral fragrance effectively. White tea and oolong may also be used as jasmine tea bases, each producing a different flavour character in the finished cup.

== Types of jasmine tea ==
Several distinct styles of jasmine tea exist, differentiated primarily by tea base:

- Jasmine green tea – The most widely produced style, pairing a green tea base with jasmine scenting. In Vietnam, Thái Nguyên green tea is the preferred base, yielding a pale golden-green liquor with gentle astringency and a clean, sweet floral finish.
- Jasmine oolong tea – Uses an oolong base, often rolled into tight balls that unfurl dramatically when brewed. The oolong base contributes greater body and complexity; the flavour tends to be sweeter and less astringent than jasmine green tea.
- Jasmine white tea – In Vietnamese production, this style uses leaves harvested from ancient Shan Tuyết tea trees (some over 200 years old), known for their distinct mountain character. The resulting cup harmonises earthy old-tree depth with the jasmine floral note and a lingering sweetness.
- Jasmine dragon pearls – A presentation style in which jasmine-scented green tea leaves are hand-rolled into small balls. The pearls unfurl slowly when brewed, delivering a gradual and consistent flavour release.
- Pure jasmine flower tea – Made entirely from dried jasmine flowers with no tea leaf base. The resulting infusion is light and purely floral, and contains no caffeine from tea leaves.

== Flavour profile ==
The flavour of naturally scented jasmine tea follows a characteristic sequence: an initial gentle astringency from the tea base is followed by a clean, sweet finish that lingers at the back of the throat. The jasmine fragrance is woven throughout rather than dominating. When the balance between tea and flower is well-calibrated, neither element overpowers the other.

A strong or synthetic-smelling jasmine aroma is considered a marker of artificial flavouring, not quality. Naturally scented jasmine tea has a fragrance that is light, clean, and builds gradually in the cup, evoking fresh blossoms rather than perfume.

== Storage ==
Jasmine tea is sensitive to moisture, light, heat, and competing odours. It should be stored in an airtight container made of glass, ceramic, or metal, kept in a cool, shaded location away from strongly scented foods such as coffee or spices. Jasmine tea absorbs surrounding aromas readily, and even brief exposure to strong competing smells can alter its character. For the best fragrance and flavour, the tea should be consumed within a few months of opening the container, as the floral note gradually diminishes over time.

== Selecting premium jasmine tea ==
A strong jasmine fragrance out of the bag is counterintuitively considered a warning sign rather than a quality indicator for naturally scented tea. Genuine natural scenting produces a fragrance that is present but gentle, building gradually in the cup rather than delivering an intense initial blast. An overwhelmingly perfume-like smell typically indicates artificial flavouring.

Quality indicators in the dry leaf include: deep, natural green colouring; well-formed, intact leaves with minimal breakage and dust; and dry, clean texture. A small amount of dried jasmine flower remnants in a batch is a natural marker of traditional scenting, though excessive flower content may be added purely for visual effect. In the brewed cup, a clear golden-green liquor, a gentle and natural-smelling steam, light astringency transitioning to a sweet finish, and a pleasant lingering aftertaste are all positive indicators.

== Cultural uses ==
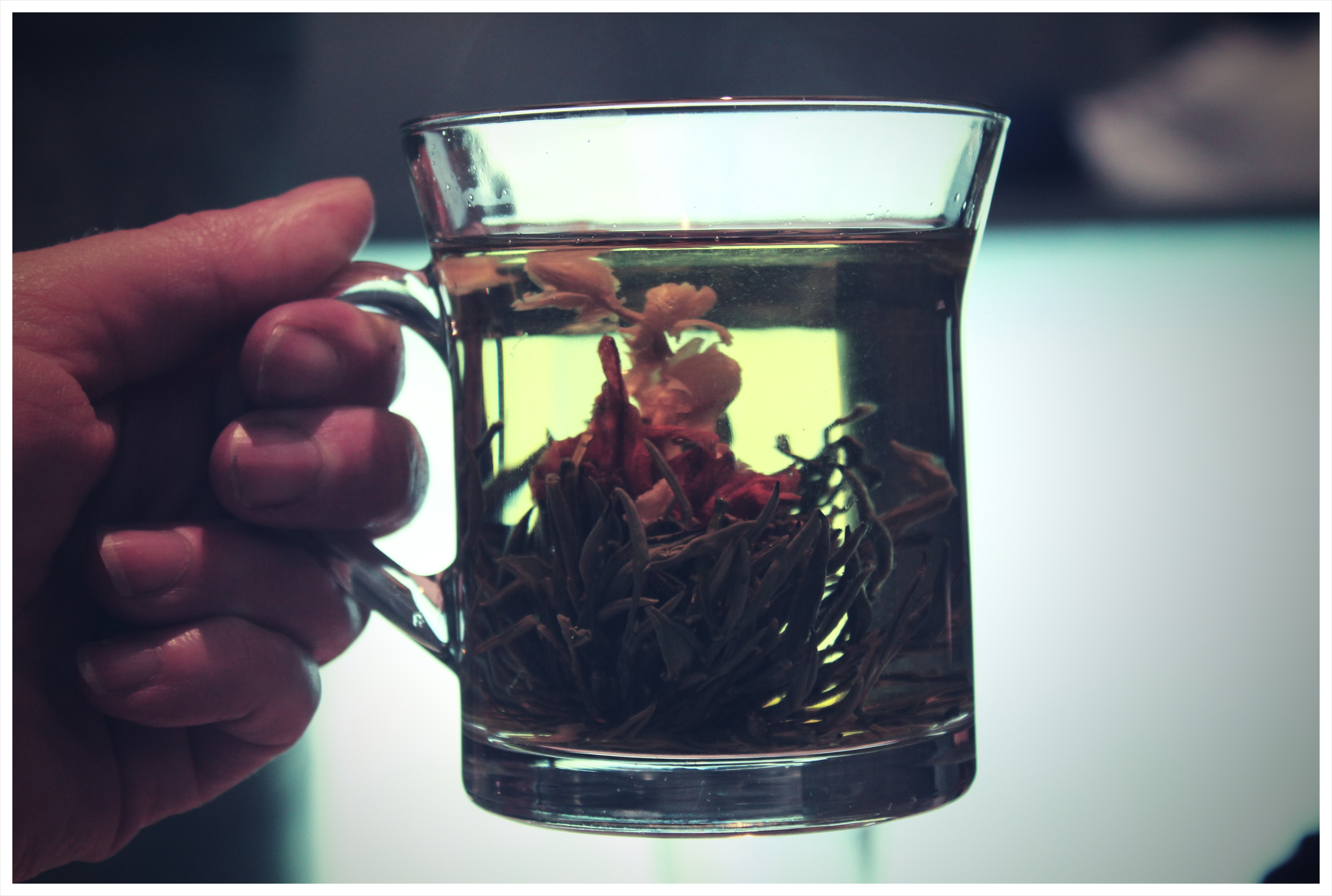
A cup of jasmine tea

In southern China, it is customary to serve jasmine tea as a welcoming gesture to guests. Jasmine tea is the local tea beverage of Fuzhou, while jasmine flowers are its municipal flower.

Jasmine has symbolic meanings in Chinese culture. The crown of the Buddhist in the Ajanta wall paintings, a world heritage site, is decorated with golden jasmine flowers. The fragrance of jasmine is thought to be of heaven. In Fuzhou's dialect, words for buying, brewing, and taking medicine are the same as those for buying, brewing, and drinking tea, reflecting tea's historical importance as a remedy.

== Fuzhou jasmine tea ==
Fuzhou, the capital city of Fujian, is the most important city in producing jasmine tea in China. The city is built at a river basin and surrounded by mountains. The climate in Fuzhou is mild, rainfall is abundant and the day-night temperature difference is notable, creating favourable conditions for jasmine flowers to grow. Jasmines are planted near rivers, while tea trees grow on slopes between 600 and 1,000 metres (2,000 and 3,300 ft) above sea level. According to the China Daily newspaper, Fuzhou had 1,200 hectares of tea gardens and in 2011 produced 110,000 tons of jasmine tea, worth 1.78 billion yuan (approximately US$290 million).

Between 960 and 1127 AD (during the Song dynasty), Fuzhou gained the name "The City of Jasmine in China". Fuzhou is regarded as the origin of the jasmine tea production process. The jasmine tea making process began during the Tang dynasty but changed substantially during the Ming dynasty. Prior to 1937, the development of Fuzhou jasmine tea was fast and products were sold to many regions. With the outbreak of the Second Sino-Japanese War, output dropped quickly. From the 1950s through the 1990s, the jasmine tea industry revived and reached 60% of the total national production, but subsequently declined again.

The Food and Agriculture Organization of the United Nations recognised the "Fuzhou jasmine tea and tea culture system" as a "Globally Important Agricultural Heritage System" in April 2014.

== Vietnam's jasmine tea tradition ==
Vietnam has developed a distinct jasmine tea tradition that has gained recognition among specialty tea drinkers internationally. Tea-growing regions such as Thái Nguyên, Hà Giang, and Lâm Đồng provide the base teas, while jasmine flowers are sourced from cultivation areas including Sóc Sơn (Hà Nội), Sơn Dương (Tuyên Quang), and Bảo Lộc (Lâm Đồng). Vietnamese production is particularly noted for its preservation of traditional hand-scenting methods, use of naturally grown jasmine flowers and emphasis on small-batch craftsmanship.

== See also ==
Jasmine species commonly used as an ingredient for jasmine tea:

- Jasminum officinale – the Common Jasmine
- Jasminum sambac – the Sampaguita
- List of Chinese teas
