= Wales (surname) =

Wales is an English and Scottish surname. Notable people with the surname include:

- B. Roger Wales (1879–1929), American politician
- Caleb Wales (born 1988), Trinidad and Tobago football assistant referee
- Julia Grace Wales (1881–1957), Canadian pacifist
- Gary Wales (born 1979), Scottish footballer
- Howard Wales (1943–2020), American musician
- Jane Wales (born 1948), American businesswoman
- Jimmy Wales (born 1966), American-British entrepreneur, co-founder of Wikipedia
- Josey Wales (born 1958), Jamaican musician
- Joseph Howe Wales (1907–2002), American ichthyologist
- Mary T. Wales (1874–1952), American university founder
- Nathaniel B. Wales (1883–1974), American physicist and inventor
- Peter Wales (1928–2008), English cricketer
- Thomas C. Wales (1952–2001), American federal prosecutor and murder victim
- Wally Wales (1895–1980), American film actor born as Floyd Taliaferro Alderson
- Willa Wales Corbitt, American politician
- William Wales (1734–1798), English astronomer
- William Wales (optician) (1838–1907), English-American inventor

== Fictional characters ==
- Josey Wales (character), a fictional character played by Clint Eastwood

== See also ==
- William, Prince of Wales and Prince Harry, Duke of Sussex (formerly Prince Henry of Wales) for some purposes have used Wales as surname, especially during their military service
- Wales (disambiguation)
