= Princess of Wales (ship) =

Several ships have been named Princess of Wales, for the Princess of Wales:

- Princess of Wales (1795 ship) was launched at Stockton. She made three voyages as an "Extra ship", i.e., under charter, for the British East India Company (EIC). On her return she became a West Indiaman. A privateer captured her in 1803 as she was coming back to England from Jamaica, but British privateers immediately recaptured her. She continued sailing to Jamaica though later, under a new owner, she traded more widely. She probably foundered in 1828, and is last listed in 1830.
- Princess of Wales (1796 sloop) was launched at Broadstairs as a Margate hoy. She was rebuilt in 1815. She became a sloop, but was referred to as a cutter. She left on her first seal hunting voyage in 1820 and was wrecked in March 1821 at the Crozet Islands.
- HMHS Princess of Wales (1899), a hospital ship formerly the SS General Werder (1874), renamed SS Midnight Sun in 1893.
- PS Princess of Wales, paddle steamers with the name
