= London fog (drink) =

Tea and steamed milk-based drink

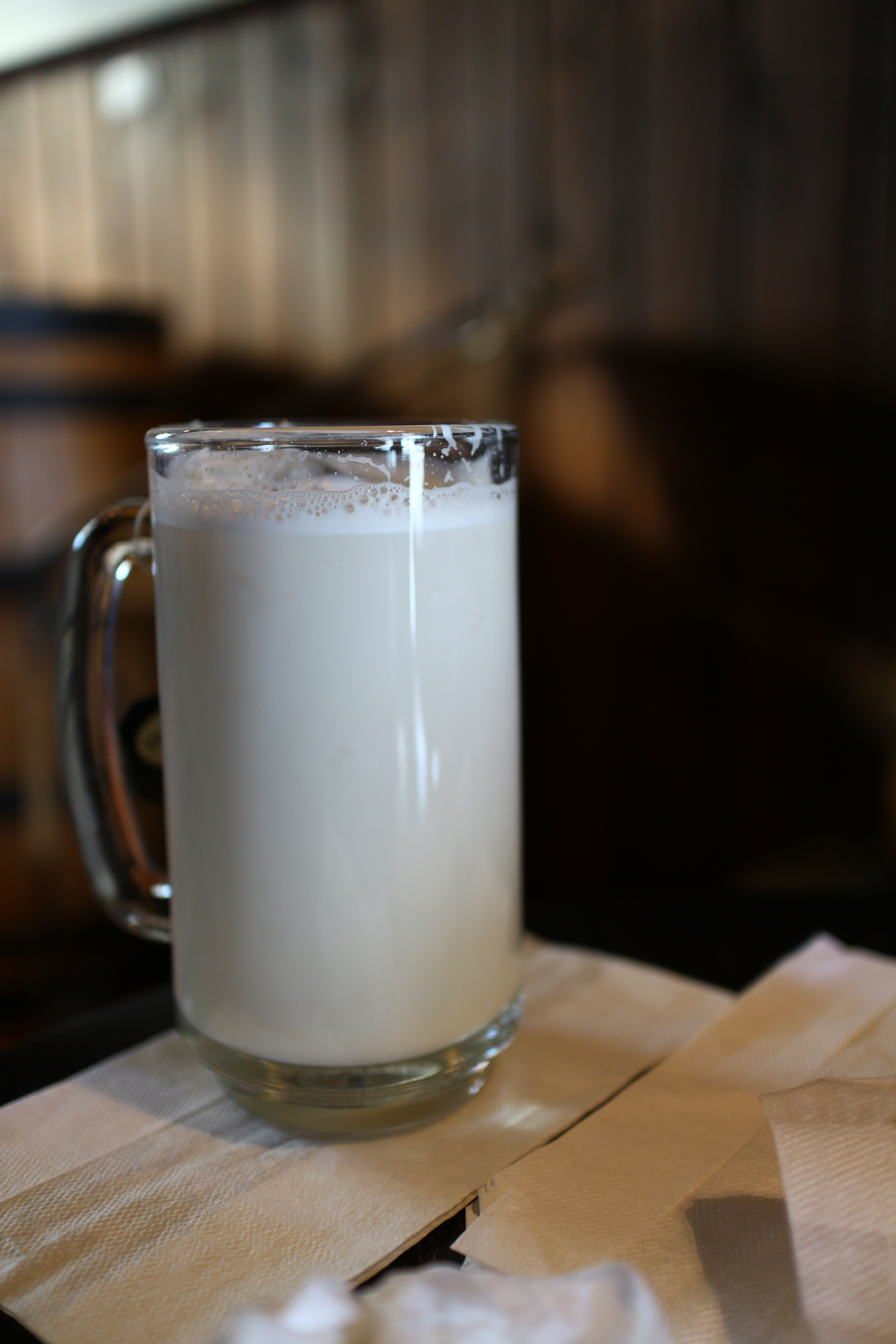
A mug of London fog from a cafe in Nanton, Alberta

A London fog is a hot tea-based drink that consists of Earl Grey tea, steamed milk, and a sweetener, often vanilla syrup. Earl Grey tea imparts its flavors of black tea and bergamot, a citrus.

== History ==
Despite its name, it was invented in Vancouver, Canada, in the 1990s by Victoria-based ceramicist and University of Victoria instructor Mary Loria. Loria, who was pregnant at the time, frequented Vancouver's Buckwheat Cafe. After inventing the drink, she began ordering the drink at other cafes and recommending it to others. The trend spread. Despite conceiving the drink herself, Loria does not know who created the name. The term "fog" refers to the steamed milk.

== Ingredients ==
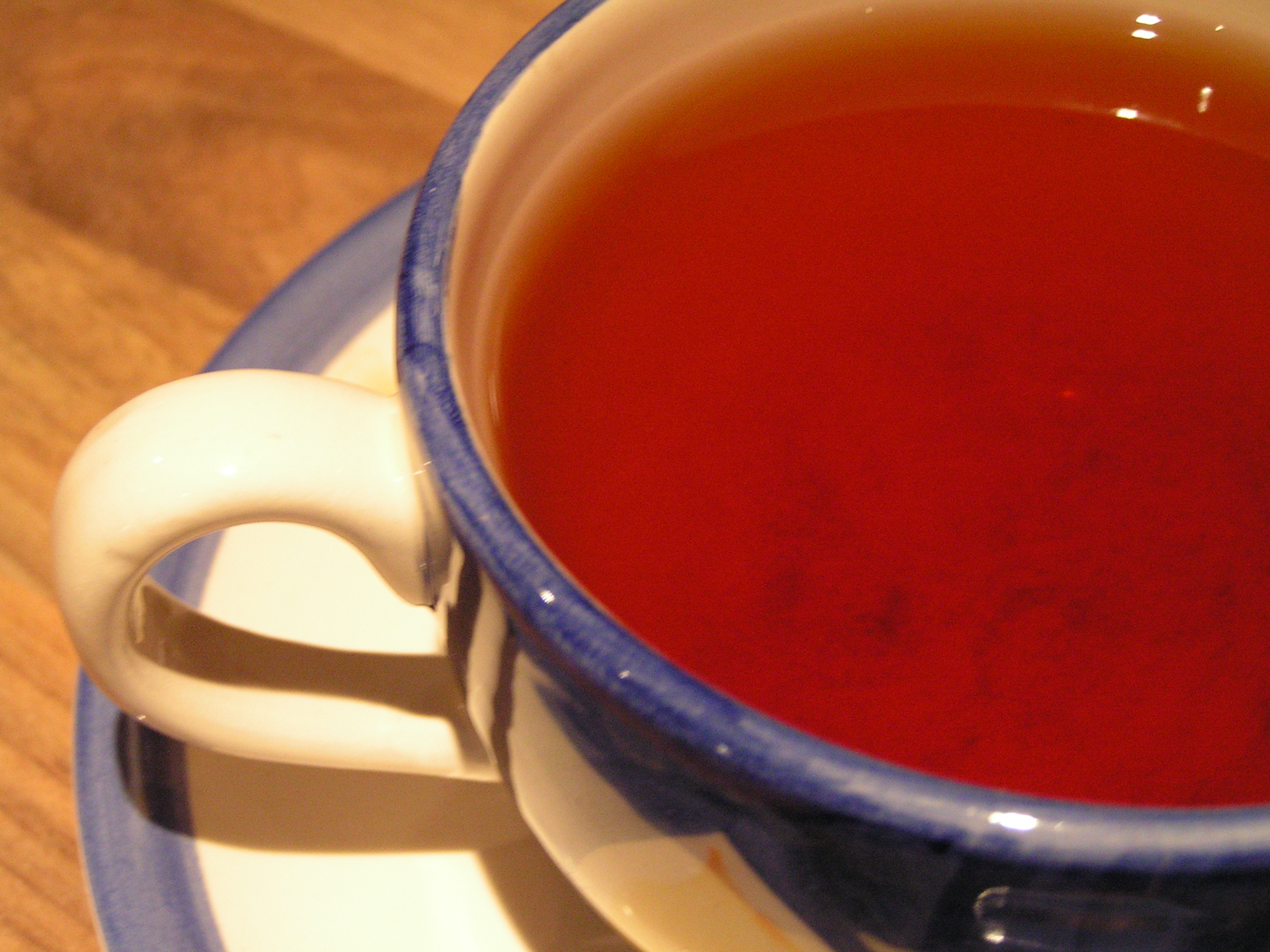
Earl Grey tea, used in the preparation of London fog, before milk is added

The basic ingredients of a London fog are boiling black tea, preferably Earl Grey tea, vanilla extract, and steamed milk of choice. A teaspoon of raw honey or maple syrup is used to sweeten it. Sometimes, a small amount of cream is poured on top of the drink, topped with sprinkles of cinnamon, nutmeg, or lavender.

== Variants ==
Variations of the London fog involve substituting the tea leaves and using milk alternatives. It is popular in the Pacific Northwest and on Canada's West Coast.

== See also ==
- List of Canadian inventions and discoveries
- Canadian cuisine
