= Prince of Wales Hospital (disambiguation) =

Prince of Wales Hospital is a public hospital in Hong Kong.

Prince of Wales Hospital may also refer to:

- Prince of Wales Hospital (Sydney), New South Wales, Australia

== See also ==
- Prince of Wales (disambiguation)
