= Earl Grey tea =

Tea blend flavoured with oil of bergamot

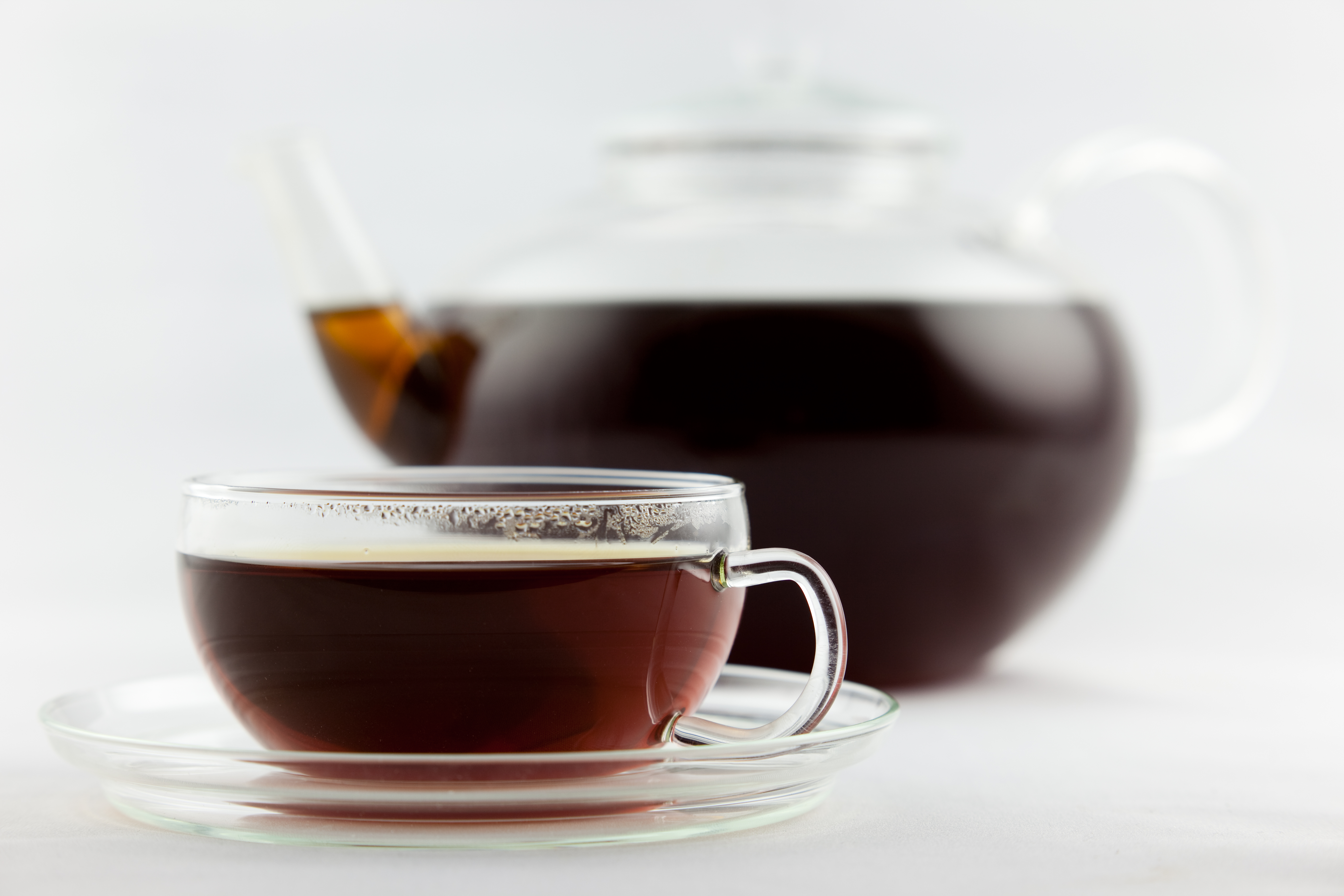
Hot Earl Grey tea made in a teapot, and decanted into a teacup

Earl Grey tea is a tea blend which has been flavoured with oil of bergamot. The rind's fragrant oil is added to black tea to give Earl Grey its unique taste. However, many, if not most, Earl Greys use other natural or artificial flavours or synthetic oils instead as this is cheaper and results in a longer shelf-life. The taste of the artificially flavoured teas is considered to be less well-balanced than that of naturally flavoured Earl Grey.

Traditionally, Earl Grey was made from black teas such as Chinese keemun, and therefore intended to be served without milk. Sometimes it is blended with lapsang souchong tea, which lends a smoky character. Other varieties have been introduced as well, such as green or oolong.

== History ==
The earliest reference to tea flavoured with bergamot dates to 1824; however the article in question makes no mention of Earl Grey. Bergamot seems to have been used to enhance the taste of low-quality teas. In 1837, charges were laid against a company accused of secretly adding bergamot to misrepresent their tea as a superior product and thus selling it at a higher price.

=== Charles Grey, 2nd Earl Grey ===
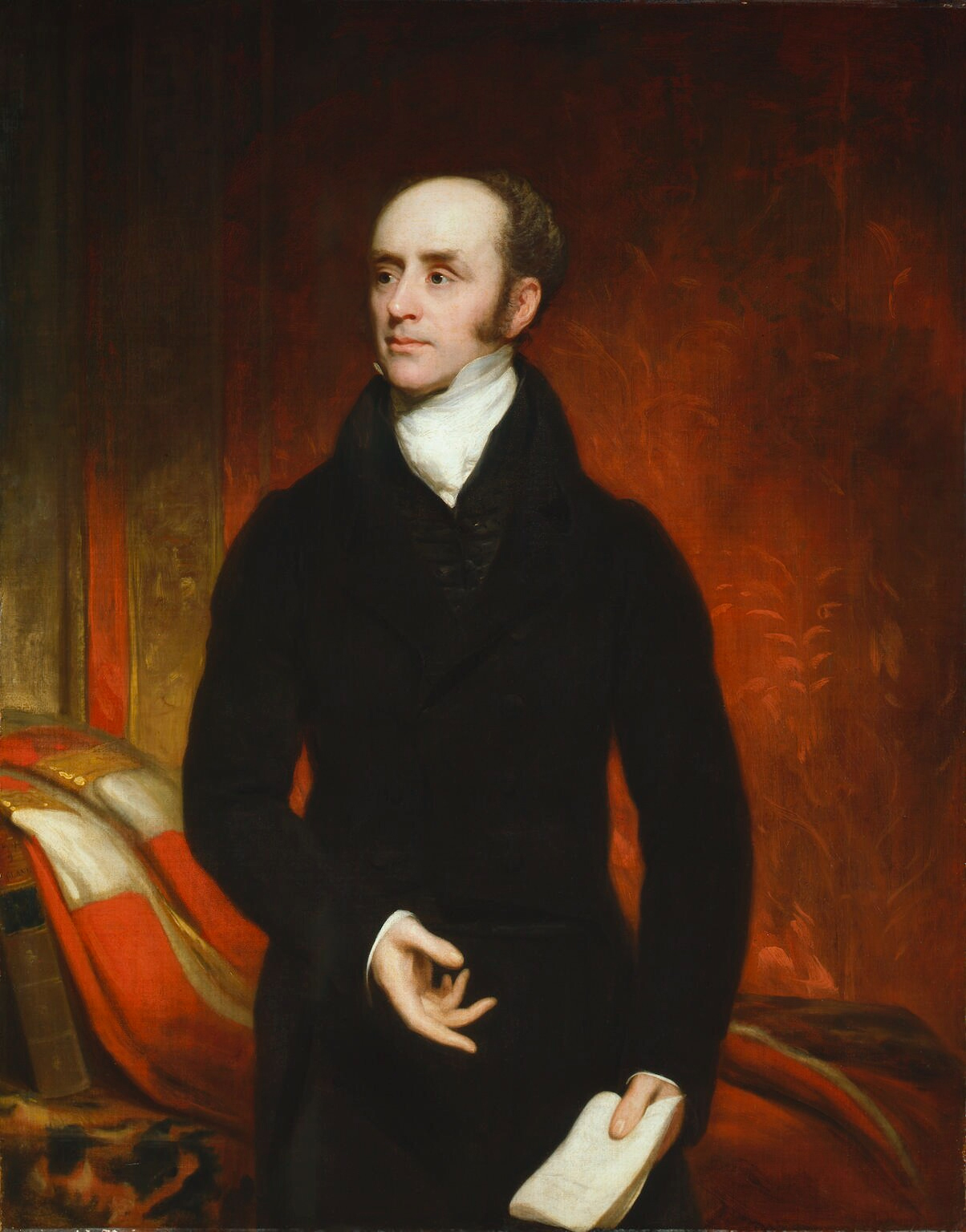
Portrait of Earl Grey by Thomas Phillips, 1820. Charles Grey, 2nd Earl Grey, the most likely namesake of Earl Grey tea.

It has been suggested that the Earl Grey blend, also called "Earl Grey's Mixture", was named after Charles Grey, 2nd Earl Grey, British Prime Minister in the 1830s. However, the fact that adding bergamot to tea was being done in a disreputable manner near the time of his death suggests that, while it is possible that the second Earl Grey encountered tea flavoured with bergamot, it seems rather unlikely that he would have championed it. Nonetheless, there have been a number of hypotheses attempting to link the tea to the earl.

One legend says that a grateful Chinese mandarin, whose son was rescued from drowning by one of Lord Grey's men, first presented the blend to the Earl in 1803. The tale appears to be apocryphal. Lord Grey never travelled to China and the use of bergamot oil to scent tea was then unknown in China. However, this tale is subsequently told (and slightly corrected) on the Twinings website, as "having been presented by an envoy on his return from China".

Another legend says that he received as a gift, probably a diplomatic perquisite, tea flavoured with bergamot oil, perhaps as a result of his ending the monopoly held by the East India Company on trade between Britain and China.

According to the Grey family, the tea was specially blended by a Chinese mandarin for Lord Grey, to suit the water at Howick Hall, the family seat in Northumberland, using bergamot in particular to offset the preponderance of lime in the local water. Lady Grey used it to entertain in London as a political hostess, and it proved so popular that she was asked if it could be sold to others, which was how Twinings came to market it as a brand.

Jacksons of Piccadilly say they originated Earl Grey's Tea, Lord Grey having given the recipe to George Charlton, partner at Robert Jackson & Co., in 1830. According to Jacksons, the original recipe has been in constant production and has never left their hands. Theirs has been based on Chinese black tea since the beginning.

=== Alternative theories ===
Other theories for the provenance of the tea suggest that its development had nothing to do with any Earl, and that the title was added at a later date.

References have been found in old advertisements dating to the 1850s and 1860s (after the death of the second Earl Grey) to "Grey's Tea" or "Grey's mixture", with the earliest being attributed to a tea merchant named William Grey in 1852. The first known published references to an "Earl Grey" tea are advertisements by Charlton & Co. of Jermyn Street in London in the 1880s. It has been suggested that the "Earl" title was added to make the tea seem more socially refined, or alternatively that it became associated with Henry Grey, 3rd Earl Grey, who was alive when the "Earl" title began to be attributed to the tea.

=== Modern impressions ===
A 2010 UK survey found that 14% of respondents considered drinking Earl Grey to be an indicator of being posh. Earl Grey tea has also been associated with Patrick Stewart's character Jean-Luc Picard, introduced in Star Trek: The Next Generation, for whom "tea, Earl Grey, hot" is something of a catch phrase.

== Preparation and variations ==
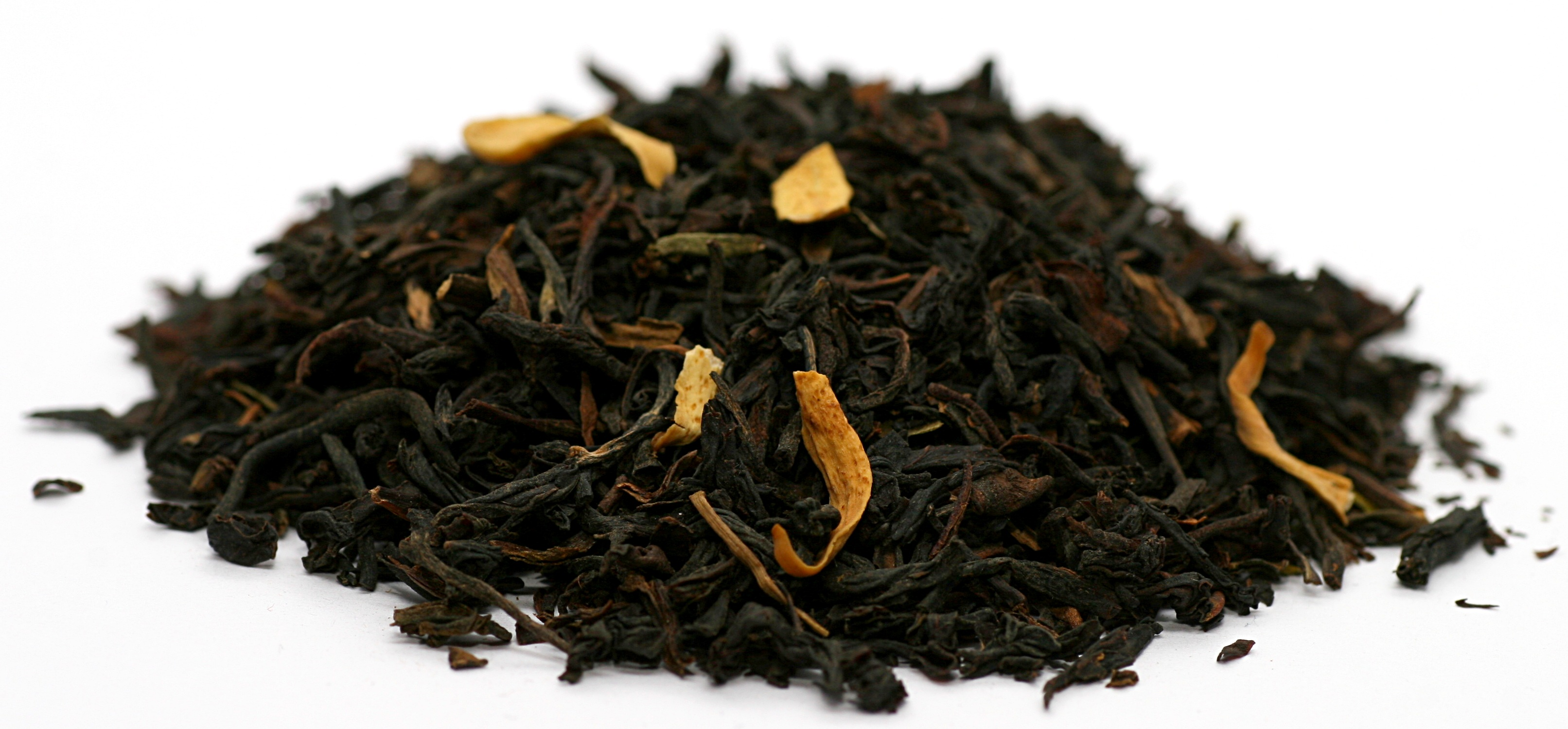
Earl Grey blend of tea leaves and bergamot orange rinds

"Earl Grey" as applied to tea is not a registered trademark, and numerous tea companies produce their own versions of Earl Grey tea, using a wide variety of tea leaves and additives.

Bergamot orange (Citrus bergamia), a probable hybrid of the lemon and bitter orange, is a small citrus tree which blossoms during the winter. It is grown extensively in Calabria, Italy, accounting for 90% of the world's bergamot oil production.

Like other black teas, the tea leaves used in Earl Grey are green when harvested, and undergo oxidation during processing. This results in a change in their chemical composition, a darker colour, and a stronger flavour. Occasionally, green tea leaves or oolong leaves are used in place of the black tea leaves. When this is the case, the oxidation process is shortened or skipped. There are two methods of flavouring tea leaves to get Earl Grey tea. The first, which is said to result in a stronger citrus flavour, is the coating or spraying of the black tea leaves with bergamot essential oils. The second method is the addition of dried bergamot orange rinds to the Earl Grey tea blend. With this method, the citrus flavour infuses the black tea leaves during the brewing process.

The process of brewing the tea to drink it varies significantly, depending on personal preference. Opinions vary on the preferred method of boiling the water, as well as the ideal steeping time. Steeping tea for too long results in a bitter flavour; two to three minutes is a common recommendation, although some recommend as long as five minutes in order to "enjoy the full benefit of the citrus aroma."

=== Blend varieties ===
- There are different varieties of a tea known as Lady Grey; the two most common kinds are cornflower Lady Grey and citrus Lady Grey, which combine Earl Grey tea with cornflower and Seville oranges, respectively. "Lady Grey" is a trademark of Twinings.
  - A blend called Russian Earl Grey also contains citrus-flavoured ingredients, such as citrus peels and lemon grass, in addition to the usual black tea and bergamot. Due to the inclusion of citrus peel, it is similar to the (trademarked) Lady Grey, but may vary in strength depending on the producer
- There are variations available including such ingredients as jasmine, as well as various flowers. A blend with added rose petals is known as French Earl Grey, which has become the most popular blend at Australian tea store T2.
- A variety called Earl Grey Crème contains additional ingredients or flavours such as lavender and vanilla.
- Several companies make variations where black tea leaves are not used. Earl Grey Green or "Earl Green" tea, replaces black tea with green tea leaves. Earl Grey White or "Earl White" tea uses white tea leaves. Rooibos Earl Grey is a variation using this South African herbal tea as a substitute.

=== In other drinks ===
A beverage called "London fog" is a combination of Earl Grey, steamed milk and vanilla syrup.

Earl Grey milk tea is a popular bubble tea flavoured drink in many Asian countries.

== Use as a flavouring ==
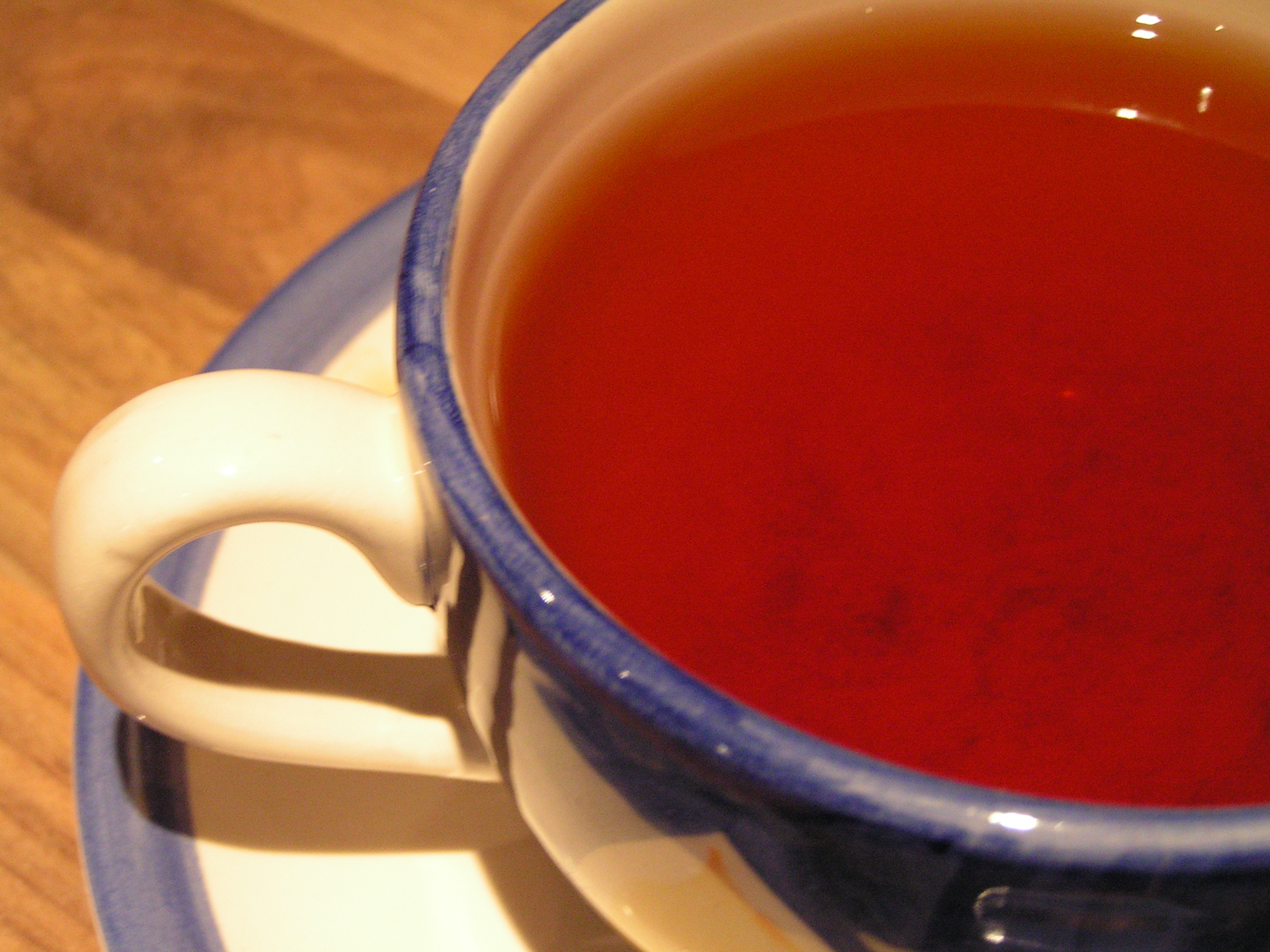
Cup of Earl Grey tea

Earl Grey tea is used as a flavouring for many types of cakes and confectionery, such as chocolates, as well as savoury sauces. Flavouring a sauce with tea is normally done by adding tea bags to the basic stock, boiling for a few minutes, and then discarding the bags. For sweet recipes, loose tea is often added to melted butter or hot cream and strained after the flavour is infused.

== Tea research and possible drug interaction ==
There is no conclusive evidence of any health effects specific to Earl Grey tea; consumption of black tea, which includes Earl Grey, may help improve alertness.

The caffeine in black tea may interfere with the intended therapeutic effects of various prescription drugs.
