= Lady Grey (tea) =

Trademarked variation on Earl Grey tea

Lady Grey tea
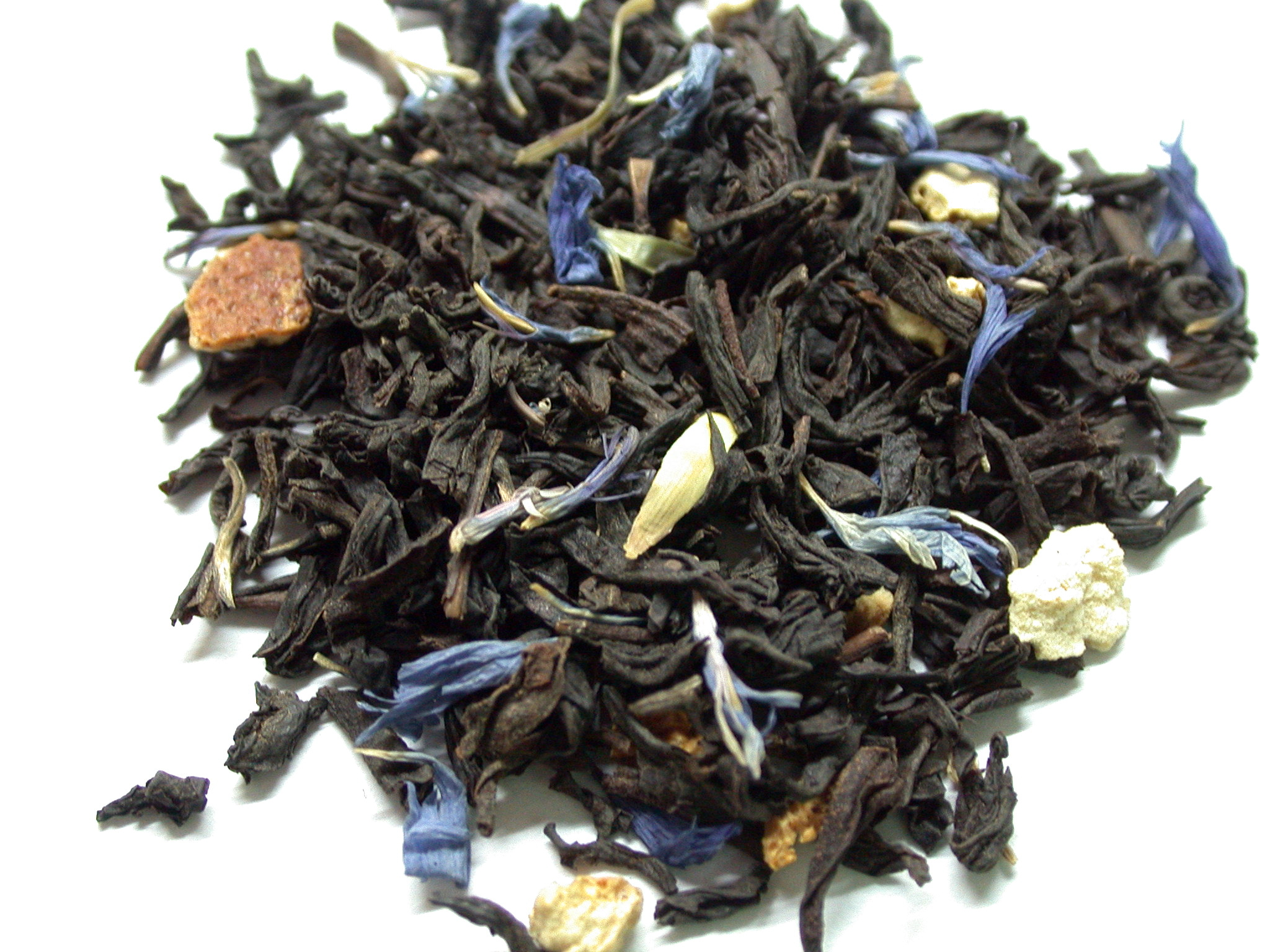
- A pile of Twinings' Lady Grey tea leaves
- Type: Beverage
- Main ingredients: Black tea; Oil of bergamot; Lemon peel; Orange peel
- Variations: with cornflower
- Food energy (per serving): negligible

Lady Grey tea is a trademarked variation on Earl Grey tea. Like Earl Grey, it is a black tea flavoured with bergamot essential oil.

== Idea and composition ==
Lady Grey tea is a variety of tea which was created by Twinings in the early 1990s and named after Mary Elizabeth Grey, the wife of Charles Grey, 2nd Earl Grey to appeal to Northern European markets, who apparently found Earl Grey tea too strong in flavour. The name is trademarked to Twinings. Lady Grey differs from Earl Grey in that it contains additional lemon peel and orange peel. It first went on sale in Norway in 1994 and in Britain in 1996.

== Variations ==
Some varieties also contain cornflower petals.

== Other brands ==
Given that Lady Grey is a trademark of Twinings, other brands have used similar names such as Madame Grey or Empress Grey.
