= Prince of Wales Theatre, Melbourne =

The Prince of Wales Theatre, with its successor, the Royal Lyceum, was a short-lived performance venue in Lonsdale Street, Melbourne, Australia.

== History ==
Melbourne's Prince of Wales Theatre was built on the site of the Tattersall's hotel's stables, which had been converted to the "Hippodrome", a circus arena, but failed to return a profit, and became the "Rat Pit", a place of dog fighting and snake charmers. The new theatre, which opened 24 May 1860, was built to seat 1,500 people and had a removable stage to allow equestrian displays to take place. Scenery was painted by a Mr Barley, who was brought from Sydney for the purpose. True to its provenance, the first entertainments consisted largely of equestrian feats, clowns and tightrope walkers, but also a few promenade concerts and political meetings.

In February 1862 the American impresario Robert G. Marsh took over the lease of the hotel and the theatre, which he reopened on 4 March as the Royal Lyceum. Admission charge was 1s. (one shilling); babes in arms and dogs 1gn. (one guinea = 21s.) and made it a place of family entertainment, opening with the pantomime Aladdin performed by his "Marsh Children" troupe of juveniles, starring Louisa Arnot. They last appeared on 18 October, with none of the usual farewell performances. Marsh was renowned for decamping without notice.

In March 1864 the site was taken over by the Virginian Tobacco Company for a factory, subsequently Garton's livery stables.
