= Wail =

Wail may refer to:

== People ==
- Wail al-Shehri (1973–2001), Saudi terrorist and hijacker of American Airlines Flight 11
- Wail Sulaiman or Wael Sulaiman (born 1964), Kuwaiti football player

== Places ==
- Wail, Pas-de-Calais, Hauts-de-France, France

== Music ==
- Black Wail, American rock band
- Blue Wail, album by pianist Uri Caine
- Dale's Wail, album by American jazz trumpeter Roy Eldridge
- Wail N Soul M, Jamaican record label

== Other ==
- wail, the sound made by a siren (alarm)
- wail, a type of vociferation
- WAIL, American radio station

== See also ==
- Whale
