= Wail N Soul M =

American record label

Wail 'N Soul 'M was a rocksteady record label created in 1966 by Bob Marley and the Wailers.

== History ==
In July 1967, Bunny Wailer was sentenced to 14 months in jail. The group then consisted of Bob Marley, Peter Tosh and Rita Marley.

In March 1968, Peter Tosh was arrested for protesting in the street. In October 1968, he participated in the Rodney riots.

In late 1968, West Indies Pressing Plant burned to the ground.

== Discography ==
=== 1966/67 Singles ===
- Bend Down Low
- Freedom Time
- Nice Time
- Hypocrite
- Mellow Mood
- Thank You Lord
- Stir It Up
- Lyrical Satirical I
- Stepping Razor
- This Train

=== 1968 Singles ===
- Funeral
- Pound Get A Blow
- I'm Hurting Inside
- Play Play Play
- Dem' A Fi' Get A Beatin'
- Fire Fire
- Chances Are
- The Lord Will Make A Way
- Selassie is the chapel (Don't rock my boat)
- Hammer
- Bus Dem Shut

=== 1969/1970 Singles ===
- Tread Along
- Trouble On The Road Again
- Comma Comma
- Rhythm
- Feel Alright
