= Lapsang souchong =

Variety of smoked black tea

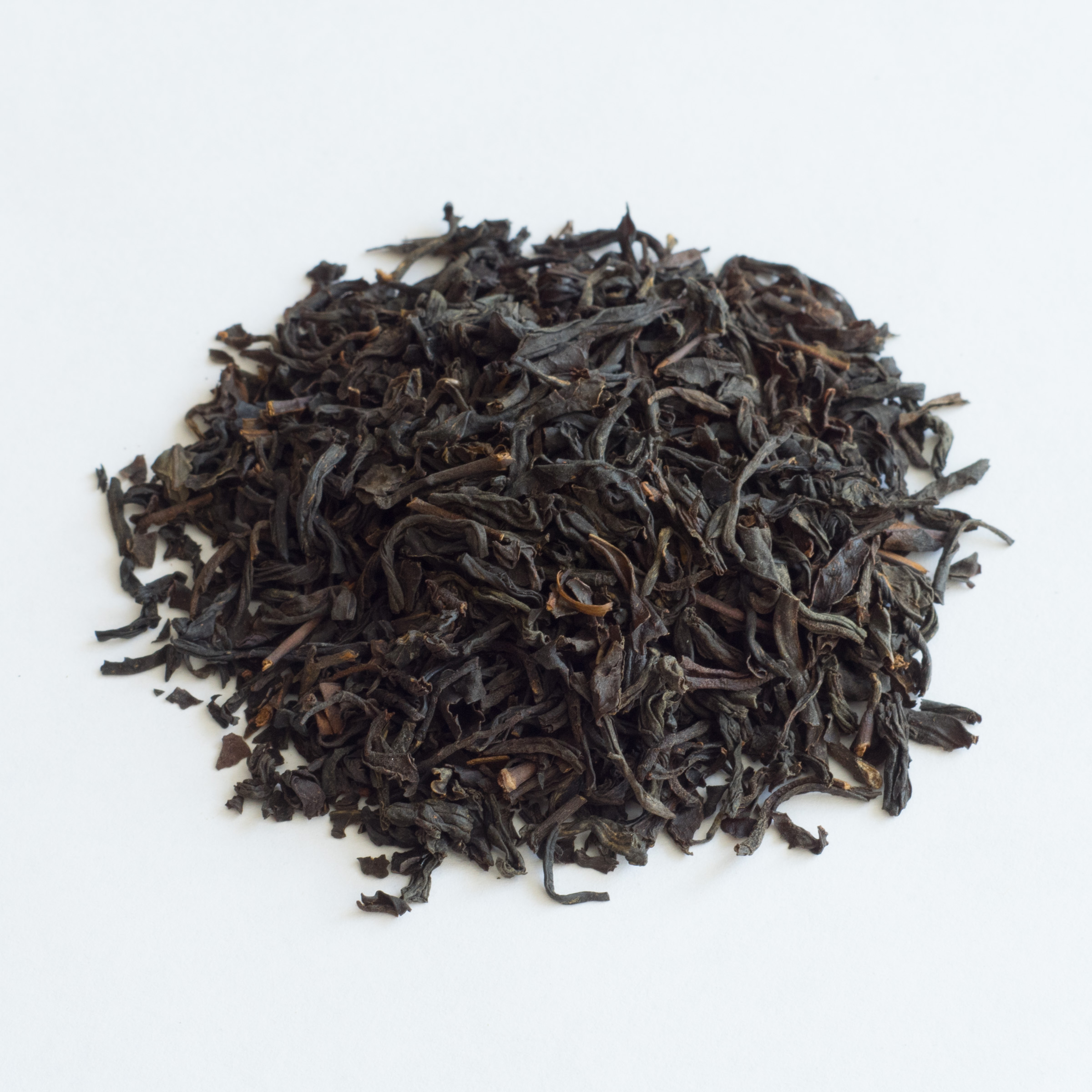
- Type: Black
- Origin: Fujian Province, China
- Quick description: Smoke-dried black tea
- Temperature: 95 °C (203 °F)
- Time: 2–3 minutes

Chinese name
- Traditional Chinese: 正山小種
- Simplified Chinese: 正山小种
- Literal meaning: “Coarse tea leaves from the Upright Mountains”
Transcriptions
Standard Mandarin
- Hanyu Pinyin: zhèngshān xiǎozhǒng
- IPA: [ʈʂə̂ŋ.ʂán ɕjàʊ.ʈʂʊ̀ŋ]
Yue: Cantonese
- Jyutping: zeng3 saan1 siu2 zung2
- IPA: [tsɛŋ˩.san˥.siw˧˥.tsʊŋ˧˥]

Alternative Chinese name
- Traditional Chinese: 立山小種
- Simplified Chinese: 立山小种
- Literal meaning: 'Coarse tea leaves from Li Mountain'
Transcriptions
Standard Mandarin
- Hanyu Pinyin: lìshān xiǎozhǒng
- IPA: [lî.ʂán ɕjàʊ.ʈʂʊ̀ŋ]
Yue: Cantonese
- Jyutping: laap6 saan1 siu2 zung2
- IPA: [lap̚˨.san˥.siw˧˥.tsʊŋ˧˥]

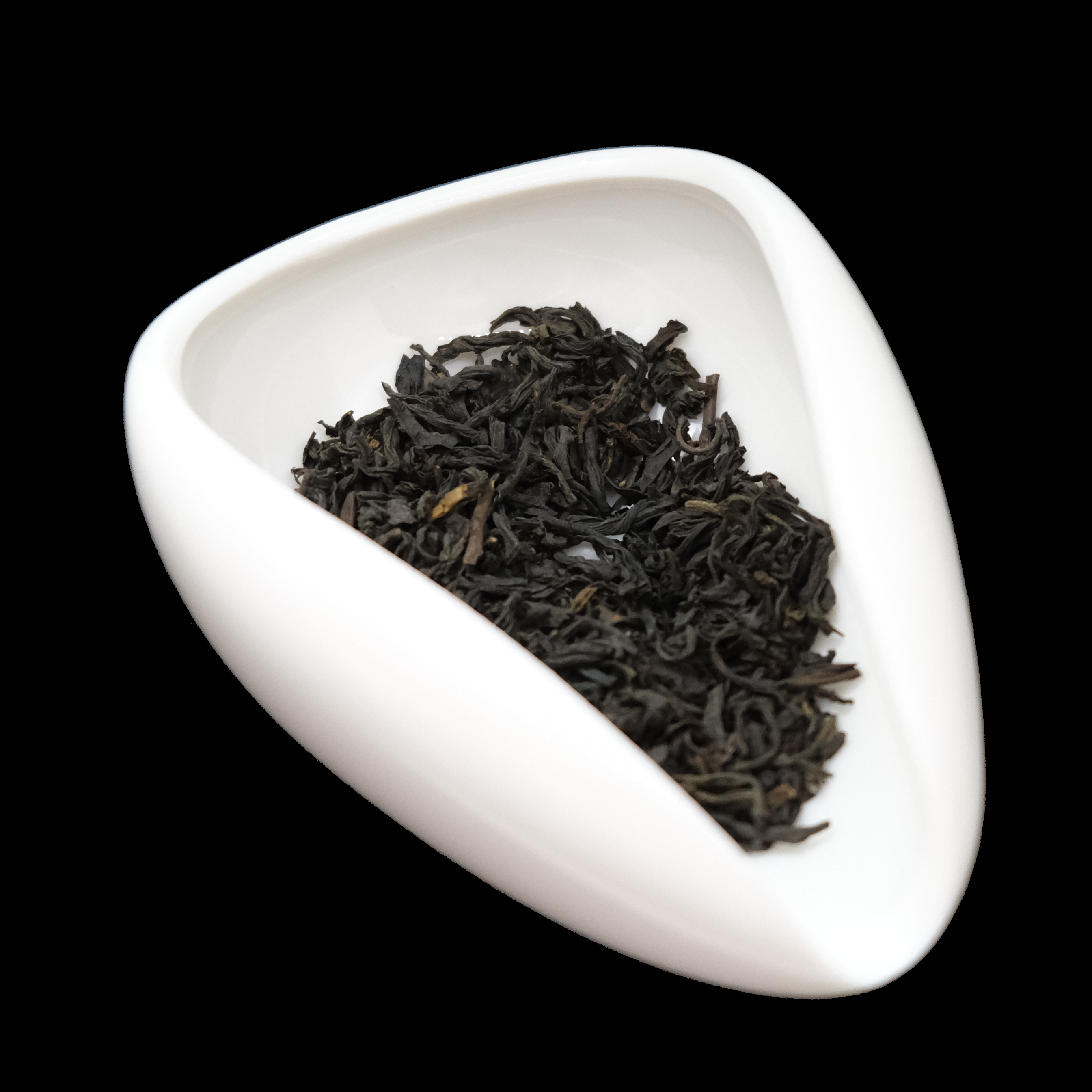
4 g of lapsang souchong tea in a porcelain tea vessel

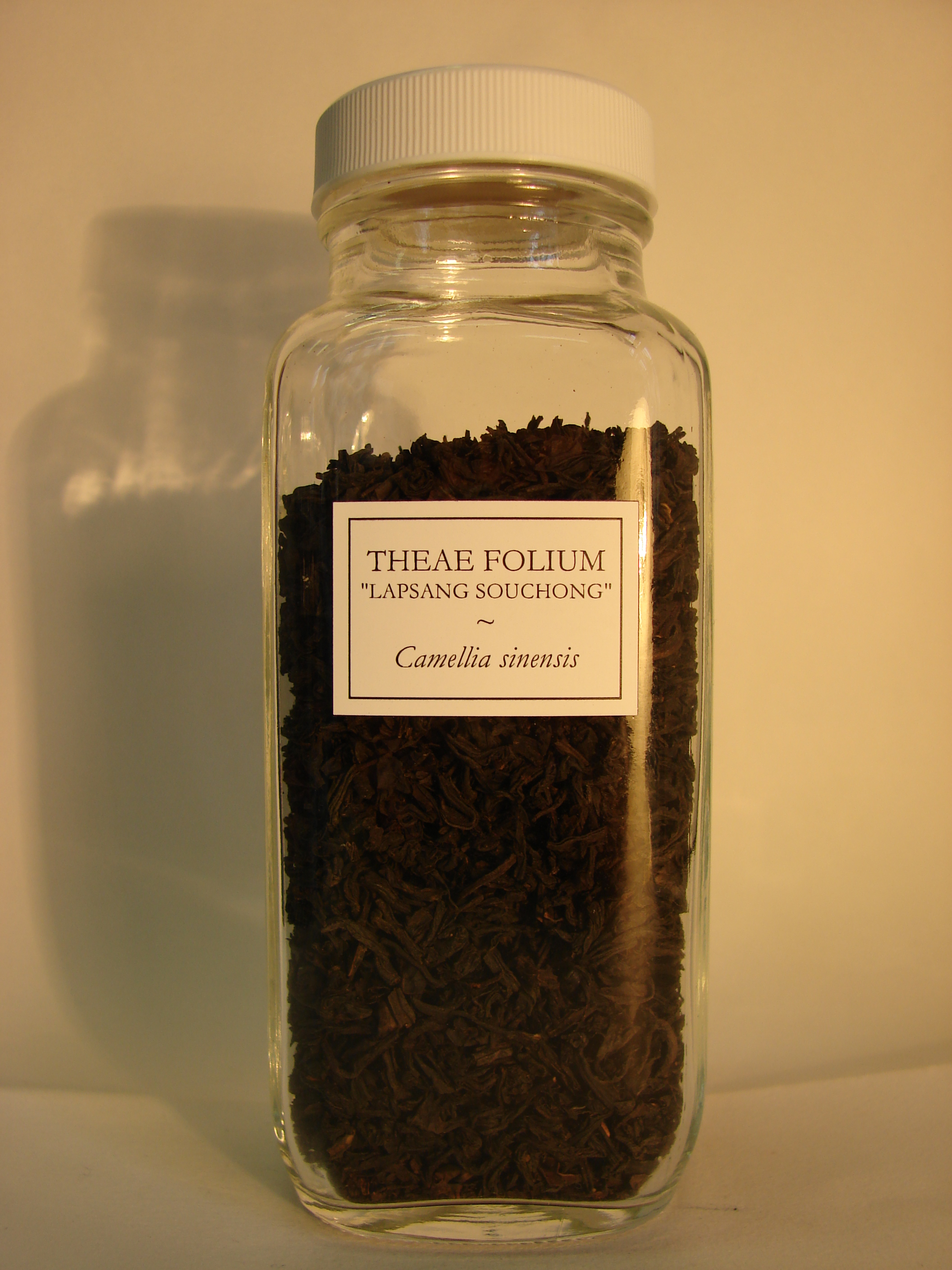
Theae Folium "Lapsang Souchong"

Lapsang souchong (/ˌlæpsæŋ ˈsuːtʃɒŋ/; Chinese: 立山小種) or Zhengshan xiaozhong (Chinese: 正山小種; pinyin: zhèngshān xiǎozhǒng, 'Proper Mountain Small Varietal') is a black tea consisting of Camellia sinensis leaves that are smoke-dried over a pinewood fire. This smoking is accomplished either as a cold smoke of the raw leaves as they are processed or as a hot smoke of previously processed (withered and oxidized) leaves. The intensity of the smoke aroma can be varied by locating the leaves closer to or farther from the source of heat and smoke or by adjusting the duration of the process.

The flavour and aroma of smoked lapsang souchong is described as containing empyreumatic notes, including wood smoke, pine resin, smoked paprika, and dried longan; it may be mixed with milk but is not bitter and is usually not sweetened with sugar. The tea originates from the Wuyi Mountains region of Fujian and is considered a Wuyi tea (or bohea). It is also produced in Taiwan. It has been labelled as smoked tea (熏茶), smoky souchong, tarry lapsang souchong and lapsang souchong crocodile. While the tea leaf grading system adopted the term souchong to refer to a particular leaf position, lapsang souchong may be made with any leaf of the Camellia sinensis plant, though it is not unusual for the lower leaves, which are larger and less flavourful, to be used as the smoking compensates for the lower flavour profile and the higher leaves are more valuable for use in unflavoured or unblended teas. In addition to its consumption as a tea, lapsang souchong is also used in stock for soups, stews and sauces or otherwise as a spice or seasoning. Beginning in the early 21st century, an unsmoked variety of lapsang souchong was developed in the village of Tong Mu Guan in the Wuyi mountains. The unsmoked variety has become increasingly popular, particularly in the Chinese domestic market.

== History ==
Lapsang souchong originated in the Wuyi Mountains during the Qing dynasty, although there are earlier examples of smoked teas. Purportedly, lapsang souchong was first created in 1646, as civilians in the Wuyi Mountain areas fled from Qing soldiers who were advancing through the area on their Manchu unification campaign against the Southern Ming. Before they fled, to avoid spoilage of newly plucked leaves, batches were quickly dried over fire and buried in sacks. Afterwards, despite the odour, the tea leaves were shipped and sold to the Dutch traders. At the time, the months-long journey from China to Europe necessitated preservation methods and the partial oxidation of this Wuyi tea, an oolong tea graded as bohea or souchong, was better able to preserve its quality. The smoky souchong tea sold and the Dutch returned to request more. There is an alternative story that soldiers during the Taiping Rebellion (1850–1864) interfered with tea processing by using sacks of freshly picked tea leaves as bedding and delaying the drying which had to be hastened by using heat from pinewood-fuelled fire.

The trade name later became lapsang souchong from the Fuzhou dialect: La ('pine') Sang ('wood') with souchong meaning 'small sort' referring to the leaves used. Prior to the British East Indian Company's adoption of the terms black and green to categorize teas, the tea leaves coming from the Wuyi Mountains area were referred to as bohea, with souchong (小种) referring to a different grade. Before lapsang came into use, the term smoky souchong was used to describe this tea leaf. Lapsang souchong that is produced in Taiwan is often referred to as tarry lapsang souchong or lapsang souchong crocodile. The word souchong would later be integrated into the tea leaf grading system to refer to the fourth and fifth leaves which are the larger, broader leaves.

The British East India Company included Souchong teas as its common imports to colonial America. In the Boston Tea Party, 35 chests of Souchong tea were destroyed.

== Cultivation and processing ==
Lapsang souchong is typically made with the larger, coarser leaves of the Bohea cultivar of the Camellia sinensis plant. The Bohea cultivar has been bred to more readily absorb the smoke flavouring. The coarseness of the lower leaves also allows the smoke to more readily adhere to the leaf. The addition of the smoke flavour makes the lower concentration of aromatic compounds in these larger leaves, relative to the younger leaves and the bud, less relevant to the taste of the final product. However, any leaf may be used in the production of lapsang souchong, and, indeed, the young leaves and bud are used in Zheng Shan Xiao Zhong. Pinus taiwanensis is used for smoking, though other woods, such as cedar and cypress, are sometimes used as well.

Smoked lapsang souchong is manufactured similar to black tea but with an intermediary step of smoking or the addition of an artificial smoke flavour. There are several ways this smoking may be accomplished. The traditional means, referred to as Zheng Shan Xiao Zhong, is to entirely process the leaves within the smoke house, equivalent to a cold smoke, though most of the smoke flavouring is instilled during the final drying phase. The indoor withering is done with the leaves laid out on bamboo mats and turned at intervals, followed by a period of rolling to break cell walls and initiate oxidation. The leaves are transferred to cloth bags where they are allowed to oxidize for 5 to 6 hours with a quick pan-firing to the seal the cell walls and halt the oxidation. A second rolling (twisting) then occurs followed by 8 to 12 hours of drying in the presence of smoke.

Generic lapsang souchong uses a similar process but with leaves collected from more distant farms. These leaves are partially processed (e.g. partially withered or oxidized) after plucking and then transported to a centralized smoking facility where they are hot smoked. Smoking may also provide a means to create a marketable product from older or less flavourful leaves. Customization can be accommodated by varying the duration of the smoking or placement of a batch relative to the source of heat and smoke, in addition to the leaf selection. The smoke shed has several upper floors or lofts made of wooden slats where leaves can be laid out, allowing batches to be closer or farther from the source heat and smoke. In addition to Fujian, tea smoking facilities are also located in Taiwan where the lapsang souchong is known for being more heavily smoked.

== Preparation, flavour and aroma ==
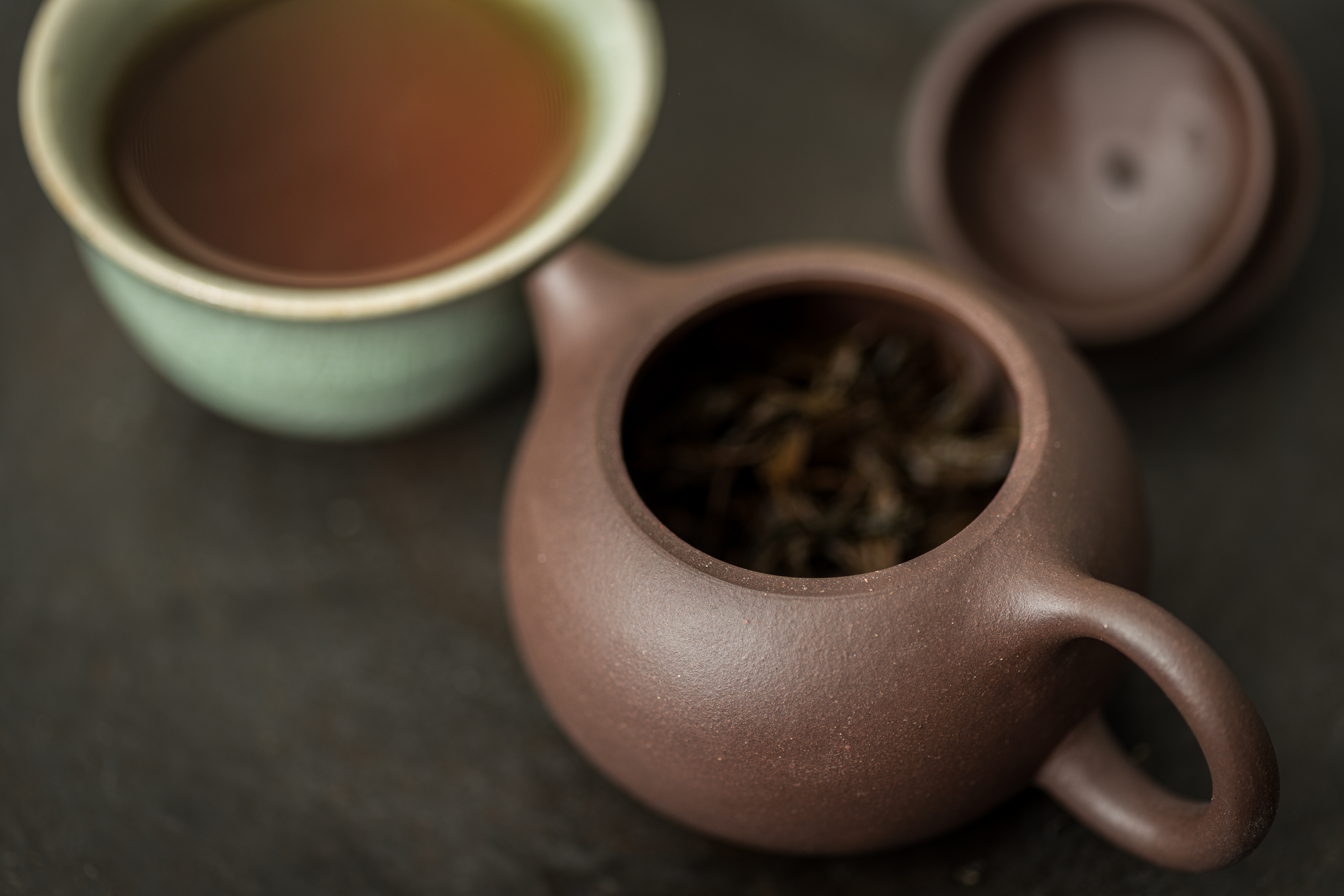
Yixing ware teapot and Lapsang tea

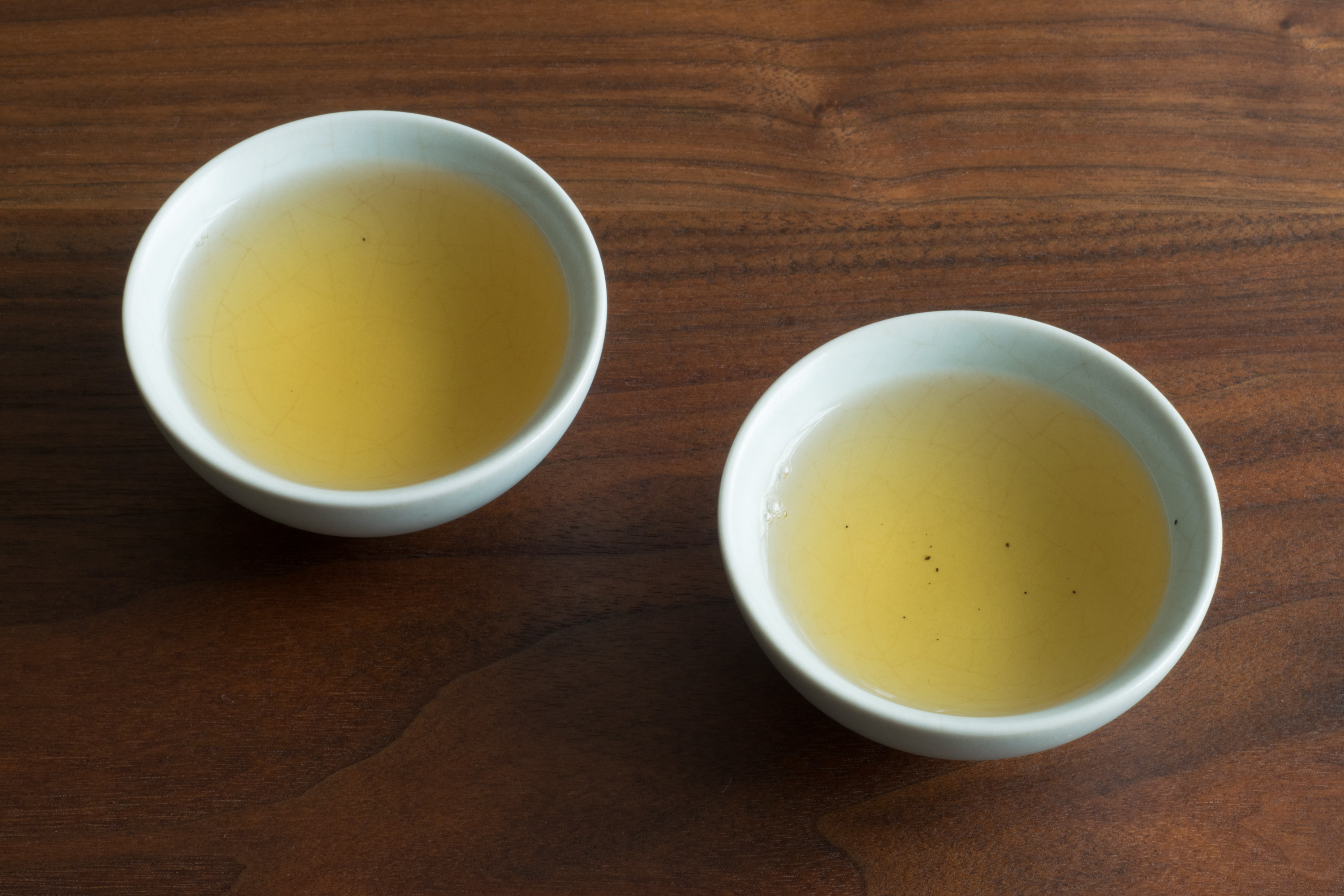
Zheng Shan Xiao Zhong lapsang souchong in two small teacups

Like other black teas, lapsang souchong is typically brewed with water at boiling or a little less than boiling, 95 °C (203 °F). It can be infused once, for 3 to 5 minutes, with 2 to 3 grams (one tablespoon) of loose-leaf tea per 150 millilitres (2/3 cup) of water used, or through multiple infusions using 5 grams for 30 seconds to one minute at a time in 110 millilitres of water.

The aroma of the dry leaves is described as having intense empyreumatic notes reminiscent of bacon while the liquor is known for its lingering smoky flavour. Other flavours associated with lapsang souchong include wood smoke, pine resin, smoked paprika, dried longan, and peated whisky. Lapsang souchong lacks the bitterness that can come with other black teas, so it does not need to be sweetened and can be brewed strongly. It is a full-bodied tea that can be prepared with or without milk.

The aroma of lapsang souchong is derived from a variety of chemical compounds. The two most abundant constituents of the aroma are longifolene and α-terpineol. Many of the compounds making up the aroma of lapsang souchong, including longifolene, originate only in the pine smoke and are not found in other kinds of tea.

== Tea blends and culinary uses ==
Lapsang souchong is used in blends of black tea to provide a more full-bodied flavour and a more robust aroma; for example, it may be blended with an Earl Grey tea. The blend called Russian Caravan consists of approximately 60% Keemun, 20% lapsang souchong and the remainder roasted oolong; the blend is intended to invoke thoughts of camel caravans en route from China to Russia in the 19th century delivering goods such as black tea which could absorb some of the campfire smoke during their months-long journey. In British culture, lapsang souchong has been popularly associated with Winston Churchill, who enjoyed the tea, but it is used more in Russian-labelled blends, especially those sweetened with spices and citrus.

With its wood-smoked flavour, lapsang souchong is also used as a spice for flavouring or seasoning foods. As well as being added to stock for soups, stews and sauces, lapsang souchong is also a spice in vegetarian recipes, a component in meat rubs, and a flavouring for boiled eggs. When prepared as a tea (rather than used as a seasoning), lapsang souchong pairs well with meals of tuna, cod, game, and eggs, or with brunch.

== See also ==
- List of smoked foods
