= USS Whale =

USS Whale has been the name of two ships in the United States Navy:

- USS Whale (SS-239), a Gato-class submarine, commissioned in 1942 and scrapped in 1960
- USS Whale (SSN-638), a Sturgeon-class submarine, commissioned in 1968 and scrapped in 1997
