= Wales (disambiguation) =

Wales is one of the four countries of the United Kingdom.

Wales may also refer to:

== Places ==
=== United Kingdom ===
- Wales (European Parliament constituency)
- Wales, Somerset, a hamlet in England
- Wales, South Yorkshire, a village and civil parish in England
- Principality of Wales (1215–1542)

=== Canada ===
- Wales, Ontario, a ghost town
- Wales Island (British Columbia)
- Wales Island (Nunavut)
- Wales Island (Ungava)

=== United States ===
- Wales, Alaska, a town
- Wales, Maine, a town
- Wales, Massachusetts, a town
- Wales Township, Michigan, a civil township
- Wales, New York, a town
- Wales, North Dakota, a city
- Wales, Utah, a town
- Wales, Wisconsin, a village

== Other uses ==
- Wales (surname)
- Wales (magazine), a literary journal edited by Keidrych Rhys, published 1937–1959
- "Wales" (The Apprentice), a 2022 reality TV episode
- "Wales" (Walking Britain's Lost Railways), a 2018 TV documentary episode

== See also ==
- Prince of Wales (disambiguation)
- Princess of Wales (disambiguation)
- Gerald of Wales (c. 1146 – c. 1223), a medieval clergyman and chronicler
- Maud of Wales (1869–1938), Queen of Norway
- New South Wales, a state in Australia
- New Wales (disambiguation)
- Wale (disambiguation)
