= PS Princess of Wales =

PS Princess Wales may refer to:

- PS Princess of Wales (1869) a Tyne-built passenger vessel sailing between Belfast and Fleetwood
- PS Princess of Wales (1878) a Clyde-built passenger vessel sailing between Harwich, Rotterdam and Antwerp
