= Prince of Wales Public School (Barrie) =

Coordinates: 44.38487°N 79.69428°W

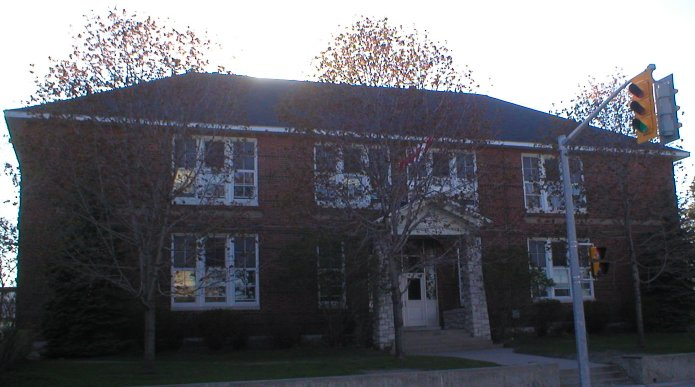

Location
- 50 Bradford Street; Barrie, Ontario, L4N 3A8; Canada

Information
- Funding type: Public
- Founded: 1876
- Closed: June 30, 2011
- School board: Simcoe County District School Board
- School number: 455466
- Former principal: Jan Olson
- Grades: JK-8
- Enrollment: 286 (2005-2006)
- Language: English, FSL, EFSL (Extended French Second Language)
- Colours: blue and gold
- Team name: Knights
- Website: pow.scdsb.on.ca

Prince of Wales Public School, built in 1876, was the oldest elementary school in the Simcoe County District School Board. The school was located in downtown Barrie, Ontario, Canada and shared a field with neighbouring Barrie Central Collegiate Institute. It was one of two elementary schools in Barrie, Ontario to offer an Extended French program. The last principal was Jan Olson. Prince of Wales officially closed on June 30, 2011.

== Closure of the school ==
Prince of Wales Public School had been placed on the list of 'Prohibitive to Repair' schools in the Simcoe County District School Board and, after an Accommodation Review Process took place, and a recommendation was submitted to the school board trustees, it was decided that Prince of Wales Public School would close in June 2011. Since closing, former Prince of Wales students have been attending Hillcrest Public School.

== Homework policy ==
There had been a significant controversy over homework with parents and educators arguing that it imposed an unfair burden on the children and that it discriminated against those from less-supportive homes. Consequently, the school had a homework-free policy for the 2007-2008 school year.

== Medical guidelines ==
New medical guidelines recommended that all schools with a competitive athletics program should have an Automated external defibrillator (AED). In launching the guidelines, the case was cited of an 11-year-old Prince of Wales student, Chase McEachern, who died of a heart attack in the school gymnasium in February, 2006. Prince of Wales did not have an AED.
