= Rosa 'Diana, Princess of Wales' =

Rose cultivar

Rosa Diana, Princess of Wales
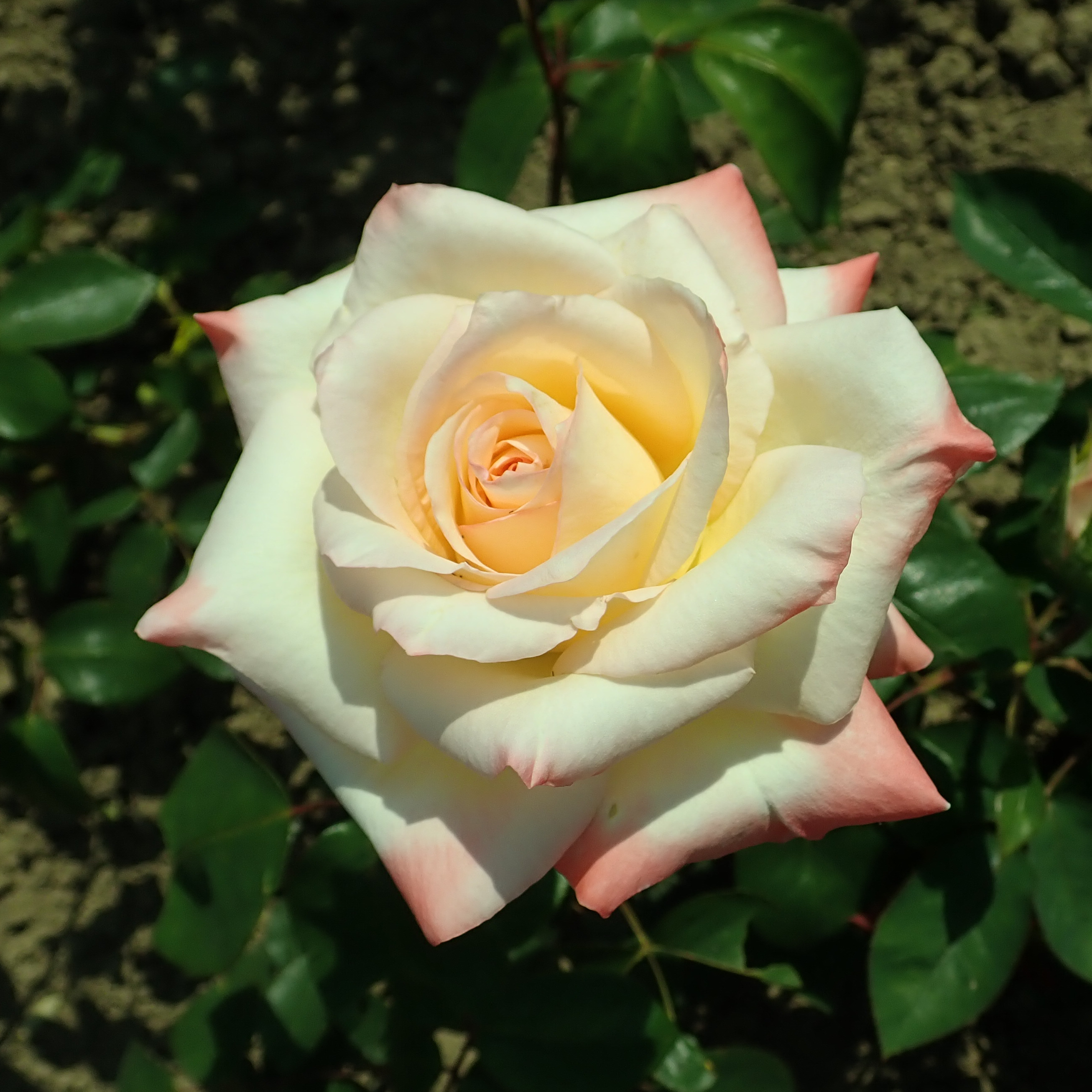
- Cultivar group: Hybrid tea
- Cultivar: 'Diana, Princess of Wales'
- Marketing names: 'Elegant Lady', 'Jacshaq'
- Origin: Jackson & Perkins (USA 1998)

Rosa 'Diana, Princess of Wales' is a pink blend garden rose, developed in the United States. It was first seen in public in 1998, at a ceremonial planting at the British Embassy to the United States in Washington.

== Naming ==
The classical hybrid tea rose was bred by Keith W. Zary of Jackson & Perkins and is also known under the names 'Elegant Lady' and 'Jacshaq'.

When unveiled in 1998, fifteen percent of revenue from sales of the rose was pledged for donation to the Diana, Princess of Wales Memorial Fund. It was not available for sale in the United Kingdom in order to avoid sales competition with Rosa 'Princess of Wales'.

== Description ==
It has ivory petals, and a mild, sweet fragrance.
