= Wael =

Wa'el
- Pronunciation: [ˈwæːˈel] or [ˈwæːˈil]
- Gender: Male

Origin
- Origin: Arabic/Aramaic/Proto-Semitic
- Region of origin: Arabia/Mesopotamia

Wa'el, also spelt Wael, is an ancient Aramaic male given name. The first currently known usage of the name was found and translated at a site called Sumatar Harabesi. There is coinage and inscriptions mentioning a King of Edessa, the "Parthian Wael" and "Wael the king" (Syriac: W'L MLK') on coins around 163AD after the Parthians captured the region from the Romans. The names' usage is pre-Islamic. The name's meaning origin is unknown, however, there are a few different definitions depending on how an ancient text was translated. These known meanings are "clan", "seeking shelter", and "protector". Pronunciation differs based on the varieties of Arabic.

The name Wael remains relatively rare.

Notable people with the name include:

- Wael Abbas (born 1974), Egyptian blogger
- Wael Abdelgawad (born 1965), American author and martial artist
- Wael Al-Dahdouh (born 1970), Palestinian journalist
- Wael Badr (born 1978), Egyptian basketball player
- Wael Ghonim (born 1980), Egyptian computer engineer, author and activist
- Wael Gomaa (born 1975), Egyptian footballer
- Wael Hallaq (born 1955), Palestinian scholar of Islamic studies
- Wael Jassar (born 1976), Lebanese singer
- Wael Kfoury (born 1974), Lebanese singer
- Wael Nazha (born 1974), Lebanese footballer
- Wael Riad (born 1982), Egyptian footballer
- Wael Sawan (born 1974), Lebanese-Canadian business executive
- Wael Talaat (1964–2025), Egyptian snooker player
- Wael Zwaiter (1934–1972), Palestinian writer and translator
