= Keemun =

Chinese black tea

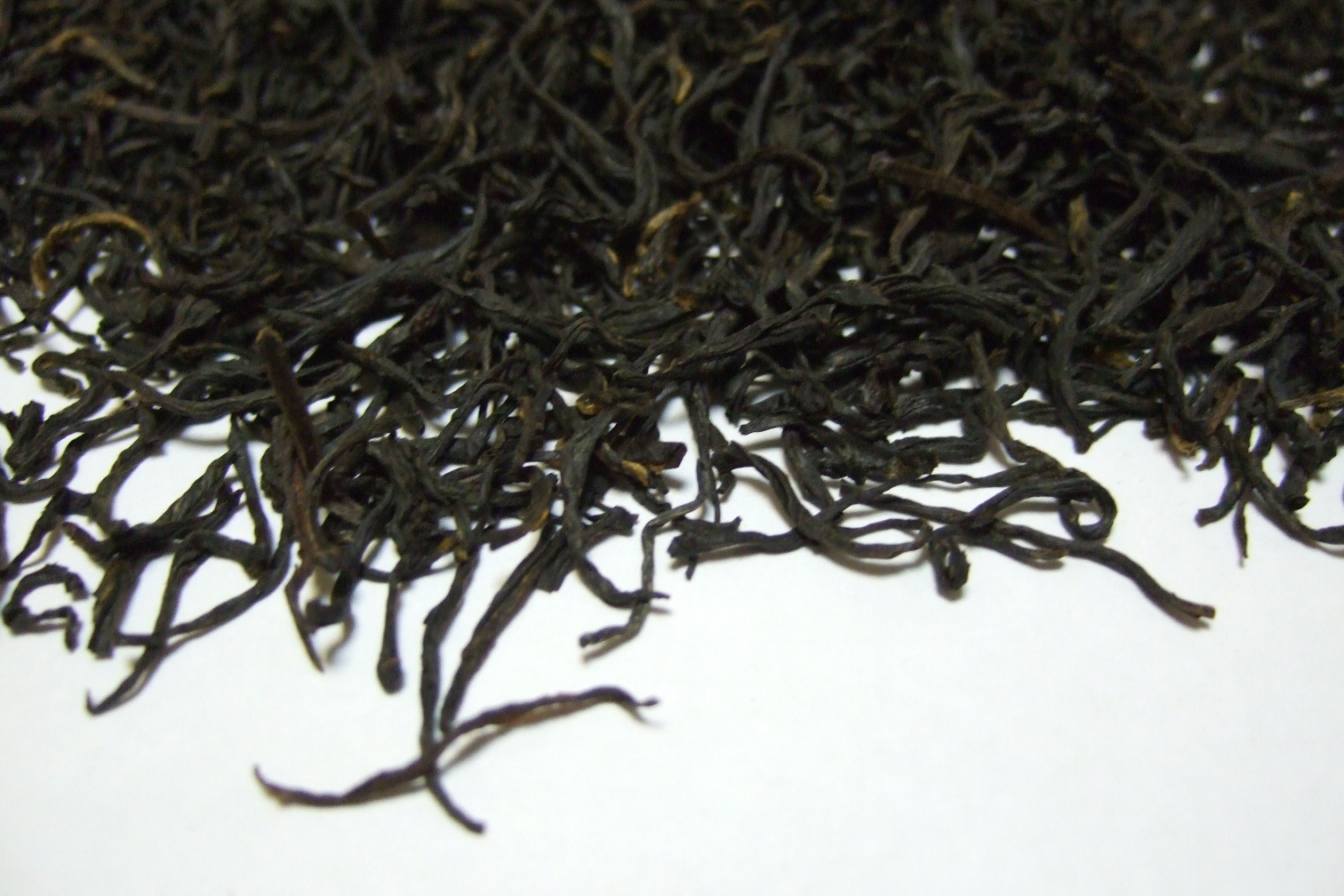
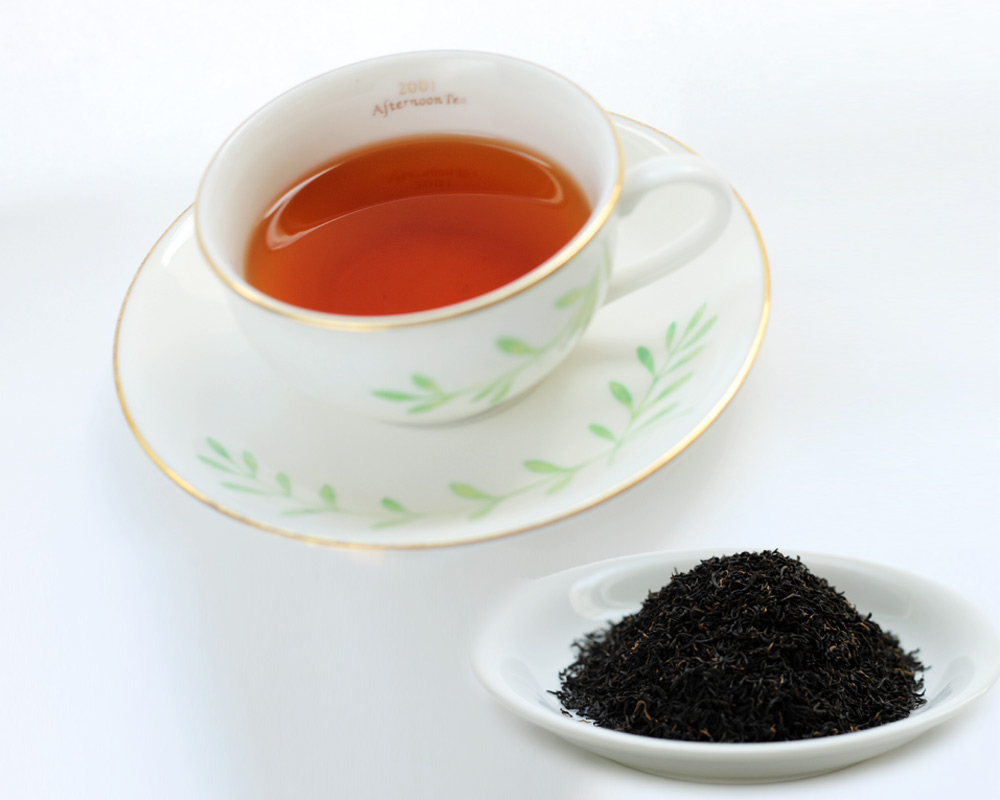
- Tea leaves After brewing
- Type: Black
- Other names: Qimen, 祁門, qímén, Qimen Hong Cha
- Origin: Qimen County, Huangshan, Anhui, China
- Quick description: a light black tea with floral, slightly smoky aroma and malty, unsweetened cocoa taste
Keemun
- Traditional Chinese: 祁門紅茶
- Simplified Chinese: 祁门红茶
- Literal meaning: Qimen red tea
Transcriptions
Standard Mandarin
- Hanyu Pinyin: Qímén hóngchá
- IPA: [tɕʰǐ.mə̌n xʊ̌ŋ.ʈʂʰǎ]
Yue: Cantonese
- Yale Romanization: Kèihmùhn hùhngchàh
- Jyutping: Kei^{4}mun^{4} hung^{4}caa^{4}
- IPA: [kʰej˩.mun˩ hʊŋ˩.tsʰa˩]

Keemun (Chinese: 祁門紅茶; pinyin: Qímén hóngchá; Cantonese Yale: Kèihmùhn hùhngchàh; lit. 'Qimen red tea') is a famous Chinese black tea. First produced in the late 19th century, it quickly became popular in the West and is still used for a number of classic blends (such as Earl Grey tea). It is a light tea with characteristic stone fruit and slightly smoky notes in the aroma and a gentle, malty, non-astringent taste reminiscent of unsweetened cocoa. Keemun is said to have floral aromas and wooden notes.

== History ==
Original Keemun is produced exclusively in the Qimen County in the south of Anhui province. It is grown in Guichi, Shitai, Dongzhi, and Yixian. The name of the tea is an older Western spelling of the name of the nearby town, Qimen (pronounced "Chee-mun"). The tea-growing region lies between the Yellow Mountains and the Yangtze River. The cultivar used for Keemun is the same as that used in production of Huangshan Maofeng. While the latter is an old, well-known variety of green tea, Keemun was first produced in 1875 using techniques adapted from Fujian province farmers.

Keemun is grown in Anhui province, China.

Many varieties of Keemun exist, with different production techniques used for each. Nevertheless, any Keemun undergoes particularly slow withering and oxidation processes, yielding more nuanced aroma and flavor. Some of Keemun's characteristic floral notes can be attributed to a higher proportion of geraniol, compared to other black teas.

== Varieties ==
Among the many varieties of Keemun perhaps the most well-known is Keemun Mao Feng (祁門毛峰). Harvested earlier than others, and containing leafsets of two leaves and a bud, it is lighter and sweeter than other Keemun teas. Another high grade variety, containing mostly leaves and stronger than others, is the Keemun Hao Ya (祁門毫芽). For Western markets, it is separated by quality into Hao Ya A and Hao Ya B categories, the former being somewhat better than the latter. Either has a markedly intense taste. Other varieties include those specifically tailored for the Gongfu tea preparation method (Keemun Gongfu, or Congou – 祁門功夫) and Keemun Xin Ya (祁門新芽), an early bud variety, said to have less bitterness. One of the black teas produced in neighboring Hubei province is sometimes referred to as a Hubei Keemun (湖北祁門) by several tea companies, but is not a Keemun in the true sense of the term.
