= Spitting =

Ejection of saliva

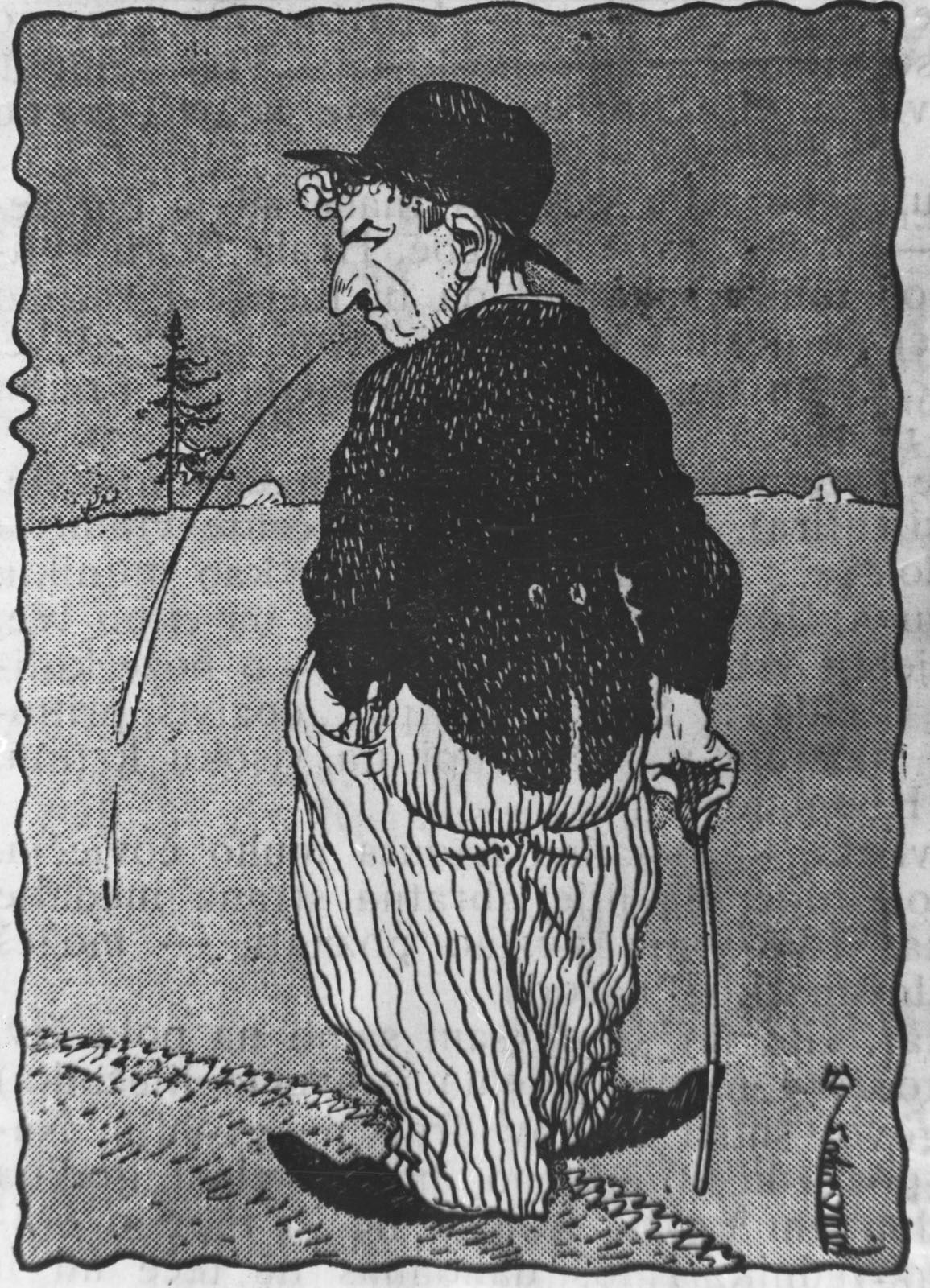
A cartoon of Charlie Chaplin spitting on the ground (1931, by Hinko Smrekar)

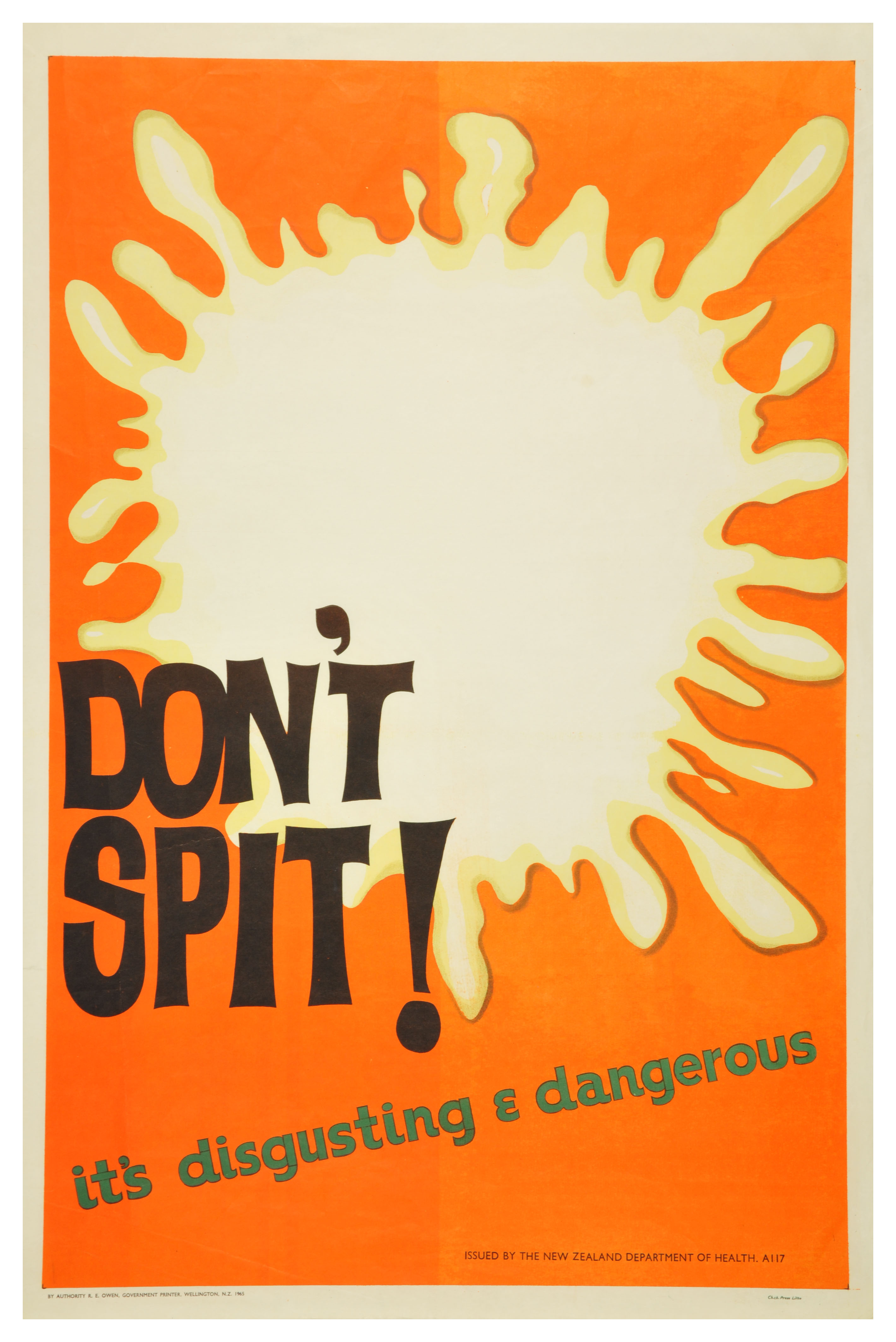
"Don't spit" prevention poster

Spitting is the act of forcibly ejecting saliva, sputum, nasal mucus and/or other substances from the mouth. The act is often done to get rid of unwanted or foul-tasting substances in the mouth, or to get rid of a large buildup of mucus. Saliva spittle of small saliva droplets can also happen unintentionally during talking, especially when articulating ejective and implosive consonants.

Spitting in public is considered rude, disgusting, and a social taboo in many parts of the world including the West, while in some other parts of the world it is considered more socially acceptable.

Spitting upon another person, especially onto the face, is a global sign of anger, hatred, disrespect or contempt. It can represent a "symbolical regurgitation" or an act of intentional contamination.

== Cultural attitudes ==
=== Western world ===
Social attitudes towards spitting have changed greatly in Western Europe since the Middle Ages. By the early 18th century, spitting had become seen as something which should be concealed, and by 1859 it had progressed to being described by at least one etiquette guide as "at all times a disgusting habit." Sentiments against spitting gradually transitioned from being included in adult conduct books to so obvious as to only appear in guides for children to not be included in conduct literature even for children "because most Western children have the spitting ban internalized well before learning how to read."

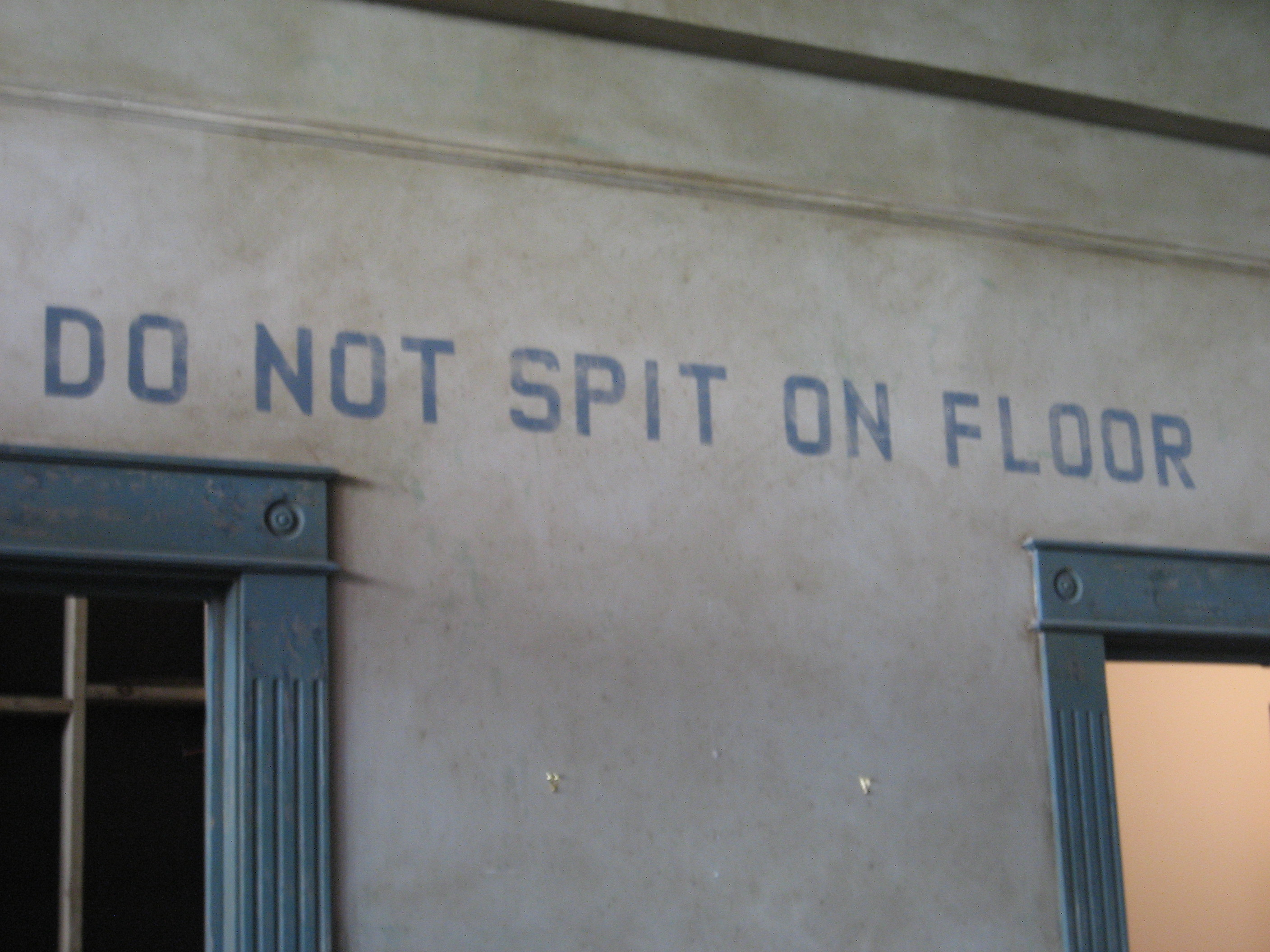
Advisory on the wall of a building in New Orleans

Spittoons (also known as cuspidors) were used openly during the 19th century to provide an acceptable outlet for spitters. Spittoons became far less common after the influenza epidemic of 1918, and their use has since virtually disappeared, though each justice of the Supreme Court of the United States continues to be provided with a personal one.

In the first half of the 20th century the National Association for the Study and Prevention of Tuberculosis, the precursor to the American Lung Association, and state affiliates had educational campaigns against spitting to reduce the chance of spreading tuberculosis. According to the World Health Organization coughing, sneezing, or spitting, can spread tuberculosis. The chance of catching a contagious disease by being spit on is low.

After coffee cupping, tea tasting, and wine tasting, the sample is spit into a 'spit bucket' or spittoon. Spitting is commonplace among athletes. There are multiple explanations for this behavior, including getting rid of the MUC5B secreted during intense exercise, as well as carb-rinsing to provide a performance boost.

In 2015, Minneapolis City Council members proposed repealing century-old laws banning spitting and "lurking," arguing they are rooted in racism and disproportionately enforced against Black residents.

==== Post-Soviet countries ====
Public spitting - particularly the forceful, audible hawking and expectoration of phlegm onto the ground or street with very audible, guttural noises (known in Russian as харкать; in the anglosphere hock a loogie) - remains more common and socially tolerated in many post-Soviet countries, including Russia. This is often linked to high historical rates of smoking, chronic respiratory issues from cold climates and pollution, and a cultural norm that views such bodily functions as natural rather than requiring suppression or discretion in public spaces. Among certain demographics, especially middle-aged and older men in working-class or rural settings, it can subtly convey straightforward masculinity or indifference to refined etiquette. This practice is also common in China and became outlawed in some places in 2003.

=== Other regions ===
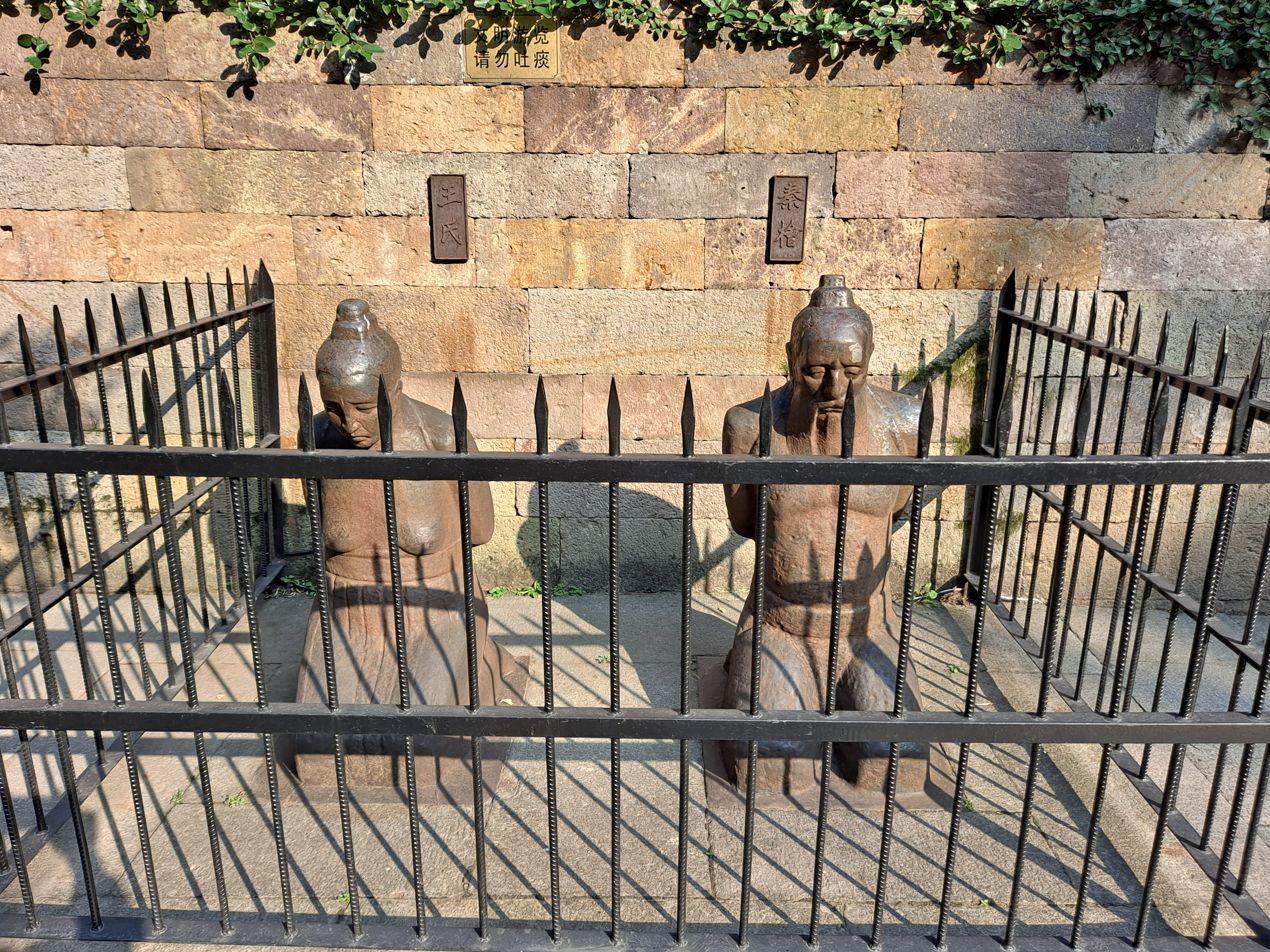
The statues of Qin Hui and his wife at Yue Fei's tomb in Hangzhou, China. It was formerly common for visitors to spit, urinate, or defecate on the statues as a continuing denunciation of their supposed role in Yue's 1142 murder, but signs now discourage public spitting as uncivilized.

Spitting is often associated with different forms of chewing juices and cultural practices such as betel nut chewing, including in India, Indonesia, Papua New Guinea, Taiwan. Spitting is a common practice in Ghana, partly associated with locals who use chewing sticks.

Ross Coomber, a sociology professor at Plymouth University, has conducted research on cultural attitudes toward public spitting. His findings indicate that spitting in public is considered socially acceptable in countries such as India, Indonesia, and China. In India, the practice also reflects a gender divide, with men more frequently engaging in public spitting, while women tend to avoid it. According to Coomber, spitting is perceived as a cleansing practice for the body by many individuals in China. In South Korea, he noted that spitting was frequently associated with smoking.

Laws prohibiting spitting, along with associated penalties, have been enacted or proposed in various countries, including China, Myanmar, the Philippines and the United Arab Emirates.

== Competitions ==
There are some places where spitting is a competitive sport, with or without a projectile in the mouth. For example, there is a Guinness World Record for cherry pit spitting and cricket spitting, and there are world championships in Kudu dung spitting.

== Spitting as a protection against evil ==
In rural parts of North India, it was customary in olden days for mothers to lightly spit at their children (usually to the side of the children rather than directly at them) to imply a sense of disparagement and imperfection that protects them from evil eye (or nazar). Excessive admiration, even from well-meaning people, is believed to attract the evil eye, so this is believed to protect children from nazar that could be caused by their own mothers' "excessive" love of them. However, because of hygiene, transmission of disease and social taboos, this practice has waned and instead a black mark of kohl or kajal is put on the forehead or cheek of the child to ward off the evil eye. Adults use an amulet containing alum or chillies and worn on the body for this purpose. Sometimes, this is also done with brides and others by their loved ones to protect them from nazar.

Shopkeepers in the region used to sometimes make a spitting gesture on the cash proceeds from the first sale of the day (called bohni), which is a custom believed to ward-off nazar from the business.

Such a habit also existed in some Eastern European countries like Romania, and Moldova, although it is no longer widely practiced. People would gently spit in the face of younger people (often younger relatives such as grandchildren or nephews) they admire in order to avoid deochi, an involuntary curse on the individual being admired or "strangely looked upon", which is claimed to be the cause of bad fortune and sometimes malaise or various illnesses. In Greece, it is customary to "spit" three times after making a compliment to someone, the spitting is done to protect from the evil eye. This applies to all people, not just between mothers and children.

A similar-sounding expression for verbal spitting occurs in modern Hebrew as "Tfu, tfu" (here, only twice), which some say that Hebrew-speakers borrowed from Russian.

== Anti-spitting hoods ==
When a suspect in a criminal case is arrested, they will sometimes try to spit at their captors, which often causes a fear of infection by Hepatitis C and other diseases. Spit hoods are meant to prevent this.

== Gleeking ==
Gleeking is the projection of saliva from the submandibular gland under the tongue. It can happen deliberately or accidentally, particularly when yawning.

== In other animals ==
- Camel
- Llama
- Spitting cobra
- Spitting spider

== See also ==
- Drooling
- Spit-take
