= Kudu dung-spitting =

South African sport

Kudu dung-spitting (Bokdrol Spoeg in Afrikaans) is a sport practiced by the Afrikaner community in South Africa. In the competition small, hard pellets of dung from the kudu antelope, are spat, with the farthest distance reached being the winner.

Kudu dung-spitting is popular enough to have an annual world championship competition, with the formal sport beginning in 1994. Contests are held at some community bazaars, game festivals or tourism shows in the bushveld, Natal and Eastern Cape. Unlike many similar sports, the distance is measured from the marker to the place the dung pellet comes to rest, rather than where it initially hit the ground.

The world record in the sport is a distance of 15.56 metres (51.0 ft) set as of 2006 by Shaun van Rensburg of Addo. The male UK record is held by Dave Marshall at 11.7m in 2022 with his daughter Harri holding the women's record at 8.3m again in 2022. It is said that hunters began using the pellets in spitting competitions to "retaliate" at their prey, as the kudu is a notoriously difficult animal to hunt, and infamous for leaving a trail of dung pellets while managing to elude the hunter.

== "Similar" sports ==
Records are also kept for cherry pit spitting, watermelon seed spitting, prune pit spitting, brown cricket spitting and tobacco juice spitting. In 2015, a sheep dung-spitting competition was introduced to Northern Ireland's Lady of The Lake Festival in County Fermanagh.
