= Kudu =

Two species of antelope of the genus Tragelaphus

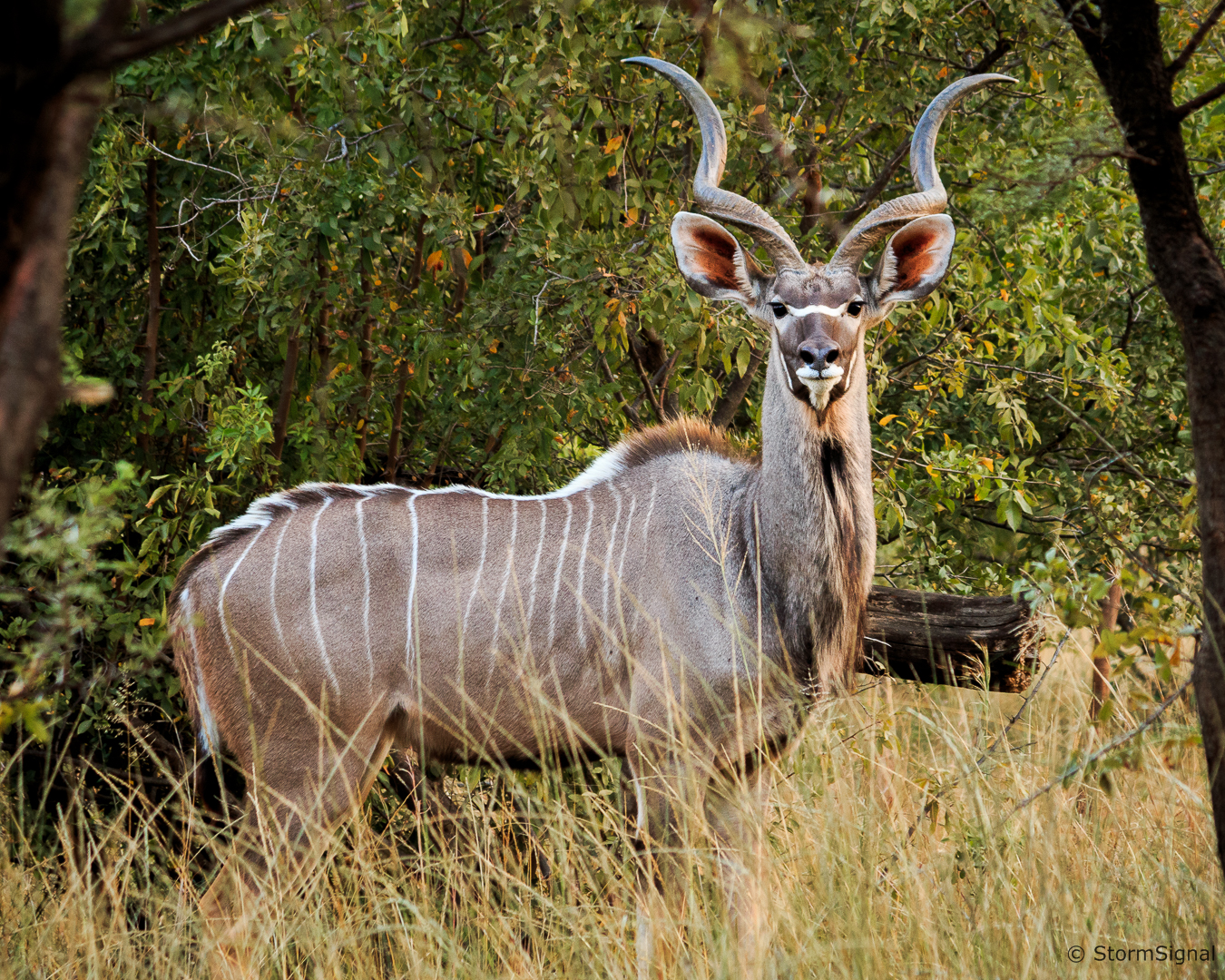
A large male greater kudu

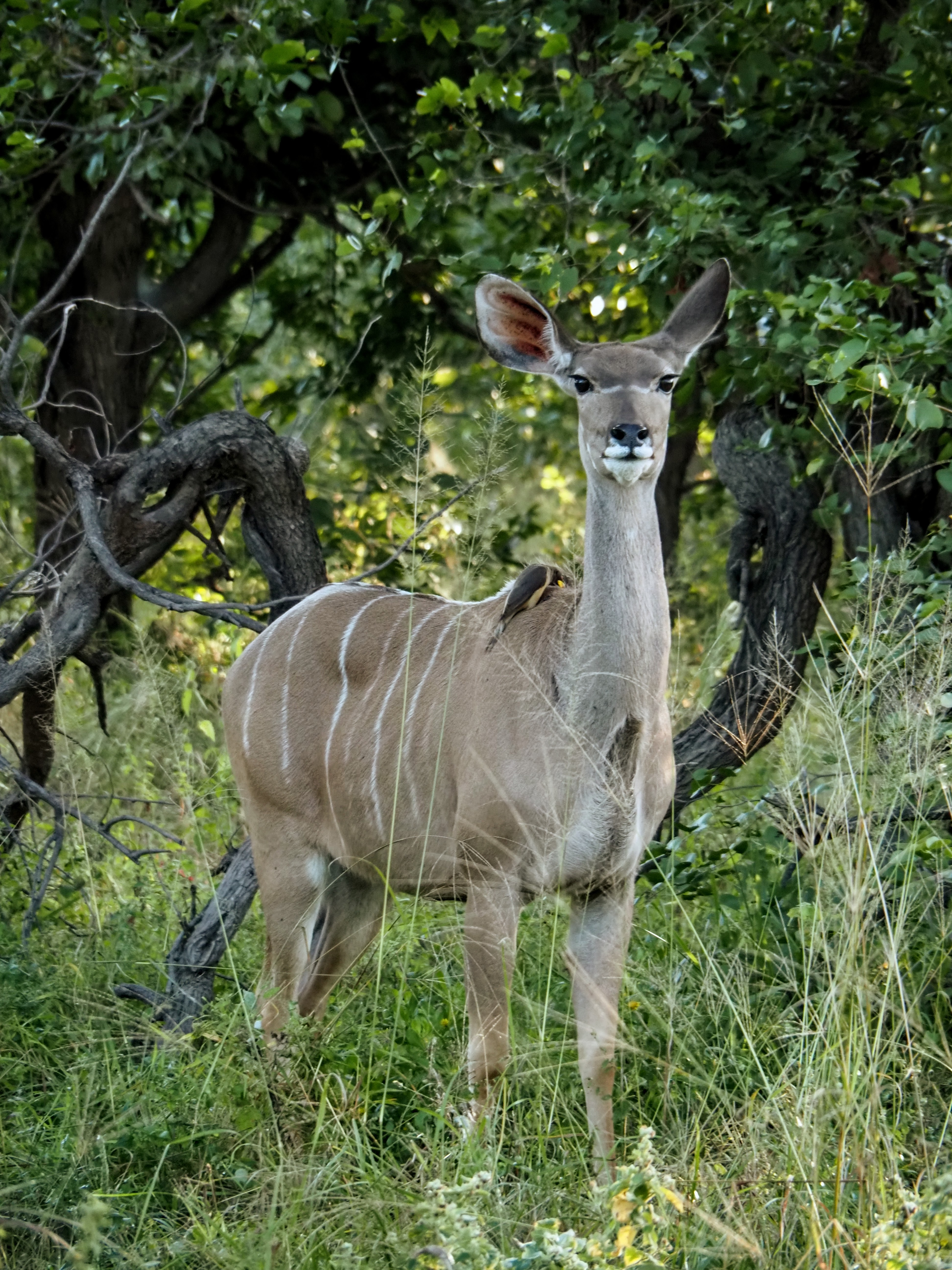
A female greater kudu

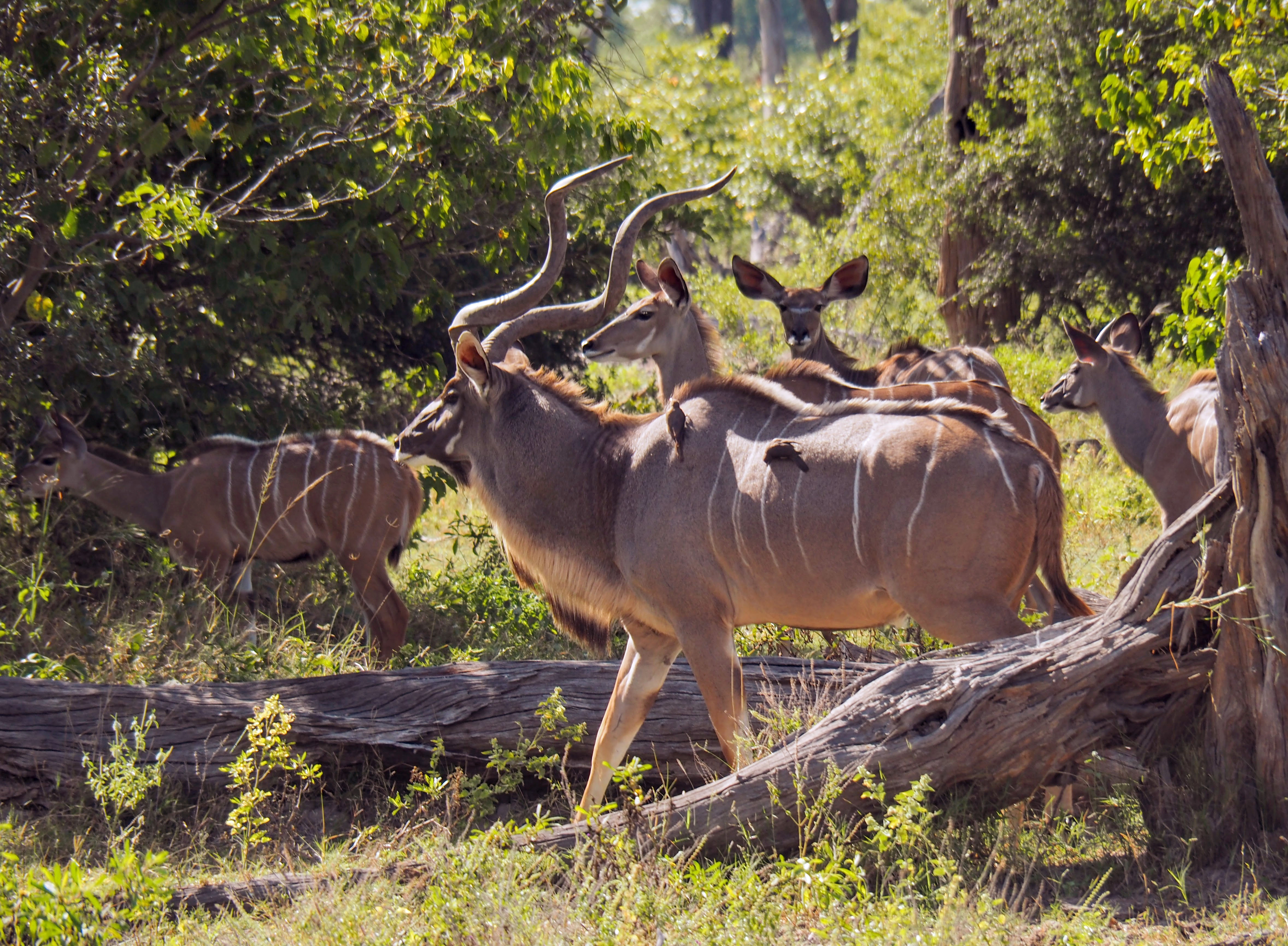
Greater kudu male with females

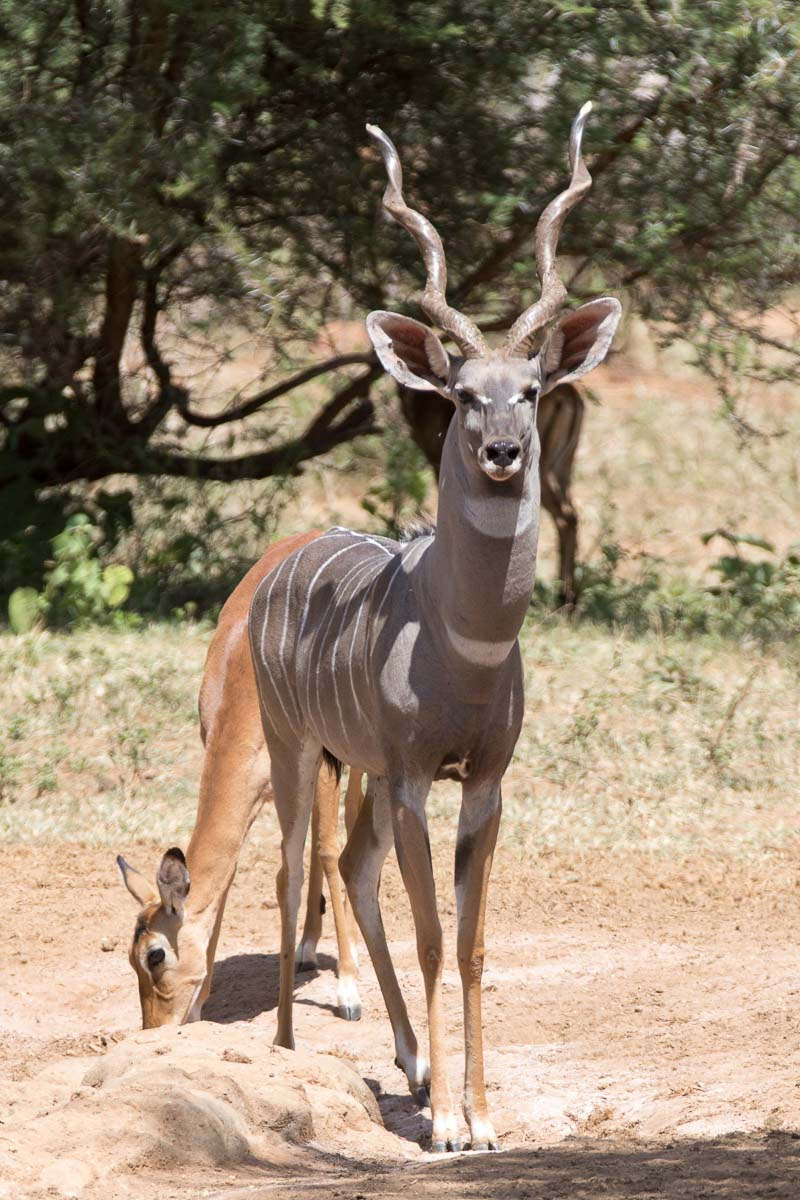
Lesser kudu male

The kudus are two species of antelope of the genus Tragelaphus:

- Lesser kudu, Tragelaphus imberbis, of eastern Africa
- Greater kudu, Tragelaphus strepsiceros, of eastern and southern Africa

The two species look similar, but greaters are larger than lessers. A large adult male greater kudu stands over 5 feet (1.5 m) tall at the shoulder, and a large male lesser kudu stands about 4 feet (1.2 m) tall. Males of both species have long horns, which point upward and back, curling in a corkscrew shape.

== Etymology ==
The name of the animal was imported into English in the 18th century from isiXhosa iqhude, via Afrikaans koedoe.

Kudu, or koodoo, is the Khoikhoi and seTswana name (tholo is the Setswana name) for this antelope. Tragos (Greek) denotes a he-goat and elaphos (Greek) a deer. Strepho (Greek) means "I twist", and strephis is "twisting". Keras (Greek) means "horn".

== Habitat ==
Lesser kudus occupy savanna near Acacia and Commiphora shrubs. They rely on thickets for protection, so they are rarely seen in the open. Their brown and striped pelts help to camouflage them in scrub environments.

== Behavior ==
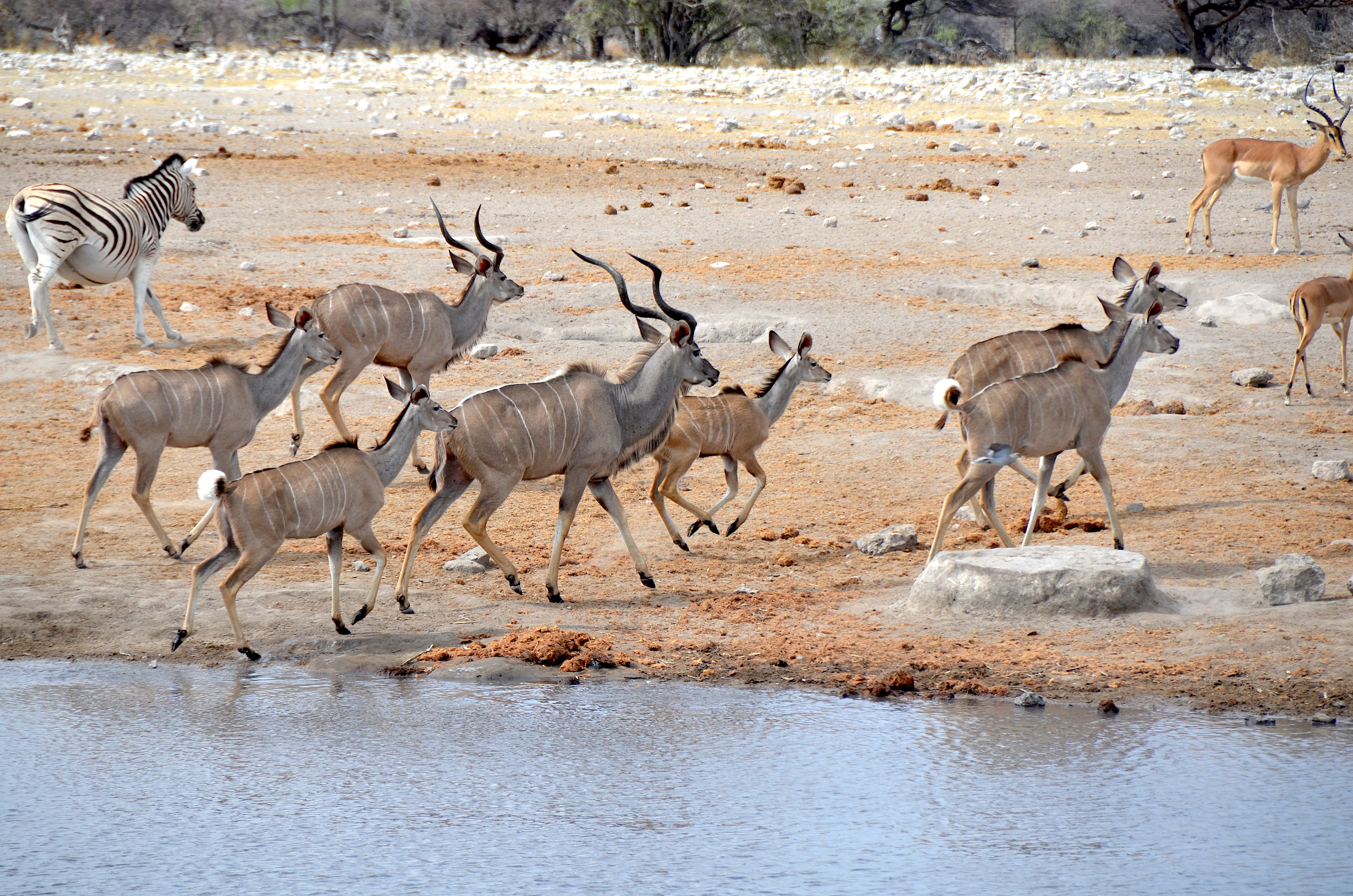
Fleeing Kudu at Etosha National Park in Namibia

As with many other antelopes, male kudus can be found in bachelor groups, but they are more likely to be solitary. Their dominance displays do not last long and are generally peaceful, consisting of one male making himself look large by making his hair stand on end. When males have a face-off, they lock their horns in a competition to determine the stronger puller; kudus' necks enlarge during the mating season for this reason. Two competing males sometimes cannot unlock their horns, and if unable to disengage, die of starvation or dehydration. Males are seen with females only in the mating season, when they join in groups of 5–15 kudus, including offspring. Calves grow quickly and at six months are largely independent of their mothers.

A pregnant female leaves the herd to give birth to a single offspring. She leaves the newborn lying hidden for 4–5 weeks while only coming back to nurse it, which is the longest nursing time of any antelope species. The calf then starts accompanying its mother for short lengths. At 3 or 4 months, the calf is with its mother constantly, and at about 6 months, they rejoin the group.

When threatened, kudu often run away rather than fight. Wounded bulls have been known to charge an attacker, hitting the attacker with their sturdy horn base rather than stabbing it. Wounded females can keep running for many miles without stopping to rest for more than a minute. They have a powerful kick and are capable of breaking a wild dog or jackal's neck or back. They are good jumpers and can clear a 5-foot fence from a standing start.

== Diet ==
Kudus are browsers and eat leaves and shoots. In dry seasons, they eat wild watermelons and other fruit for their liquid content and natural sugars. The lesser kudu is less dependent on water sources than the greater kudu.

== Predators and threats ==
Predators, such as leopards, African wild dogs, spotted hyenas, eagles, and pythons, hunt kudu and their young. Kudu numbers are also affected by humans hunting them for their meat, hides, and horns, or using their habitats for charcoal burning and farming.

Kudus were highly susceptible to the rinderpest virus (now eradicated after a vaccination program in domestic cattle), and many scientists believe that in earlier times, recurring epidemics of the disease reduced kudu populations in East Africa.

Kudus are susceptible to rabies in times of extended drought. They have been known to enter farmhouses and other buildings when infected. Infected animals appear tame and have a distinct frothing at the mouth. Rabid kudus are fearless, and bulls may sometimes attack humans who get too close.

== Meat ==
Kudu meat is similar to venison (deer), with a slight gamey, liver-like flavor. It is a very dry and lean meat, so it needs to be cooked carefully to avoid drying it out.

== In music and culture ==
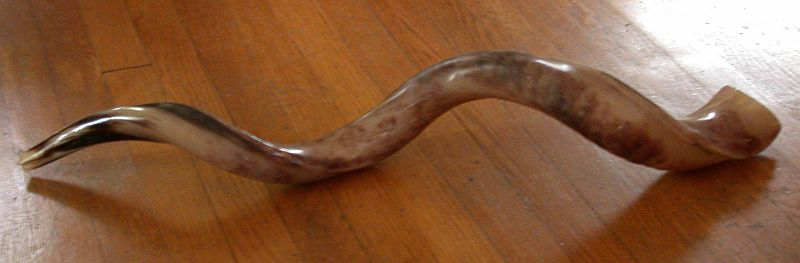
A kudu horn, used by Yemenite Jews as a shofar for the holiday of Rosh Hashanah.

A kudu horn is a musical instrument made from the horn of the kudu. A form of it is sometimes used as a shofar in Jewish ceremonies. It is seen in the Western world in its use as a part of the Scouting movement's Wood Badge training program; the sounding of the horn signals the start of a Wood Badge training course or activity. A horn of this shape, when used by football fans, is called kuduzela (a portmanteau of "kudu" and "vuvuzela").

The kudu, tholo in the languages of Sepedi, Setswana, and Venda, is a tribal totem of the Barolong and Batlhaping people of Botswana and South Africa.

In the sport of kudu dung-spitting, contestants spit pellets of kudu dung, with the furthest distance (including the roll) reached being the winner. The sport is mostly popular among the Afrikaner community in South Africa, and a world championship is held each year.

Kudu hunting is prominently featured in Ernest Hemingway's nonfiction book Green Hills of Africa, an account of a month-long safari his then-wife, Pauline Pfeiffer, and he went on in East Africa in December 1933.
