= Inkjet spittoon =

Electronic component

Interior of an HP DeskJet 920C, showing the spittoon and cleaning station.

A mound of dried ink inside the HP spittoon. When the pile grows high enough, it jams the printer.

An inkjet spittoon is a component in electronic inkjet printers. Inkjet printers commonly experience a problem of drying out which blocks the flow of ink. To restore flow, it is necessary to clean the inkjet head by spraying (or "spitting") excess ink through all the jets to reapply moisture and unblock the adjacent clogged jets. The excess ink used for cleaning needs to be collected somewhere to avoid creating a mess below the printer, so inkjet printers have a "spittoon" hidden inside to collect this ink.

The inkjet printer spittoon is usually a permanent component designed to last the life of the printer, not removable or replaceable by the user. A spittoon overfilled with partially dried ink can cause inkjet printer failures. Some professional inkjet printers have replaceable spittoons.

Different printer manufacturers use different spittoon technology. Hewlett-Packard uses a small plastic tray below the cleaning station and cartridge storage dock, while Epson uses an absorbent fiber pad in a large shallow tray below the width of the printer.
