= Degustation =

Appreciative tasting of foods

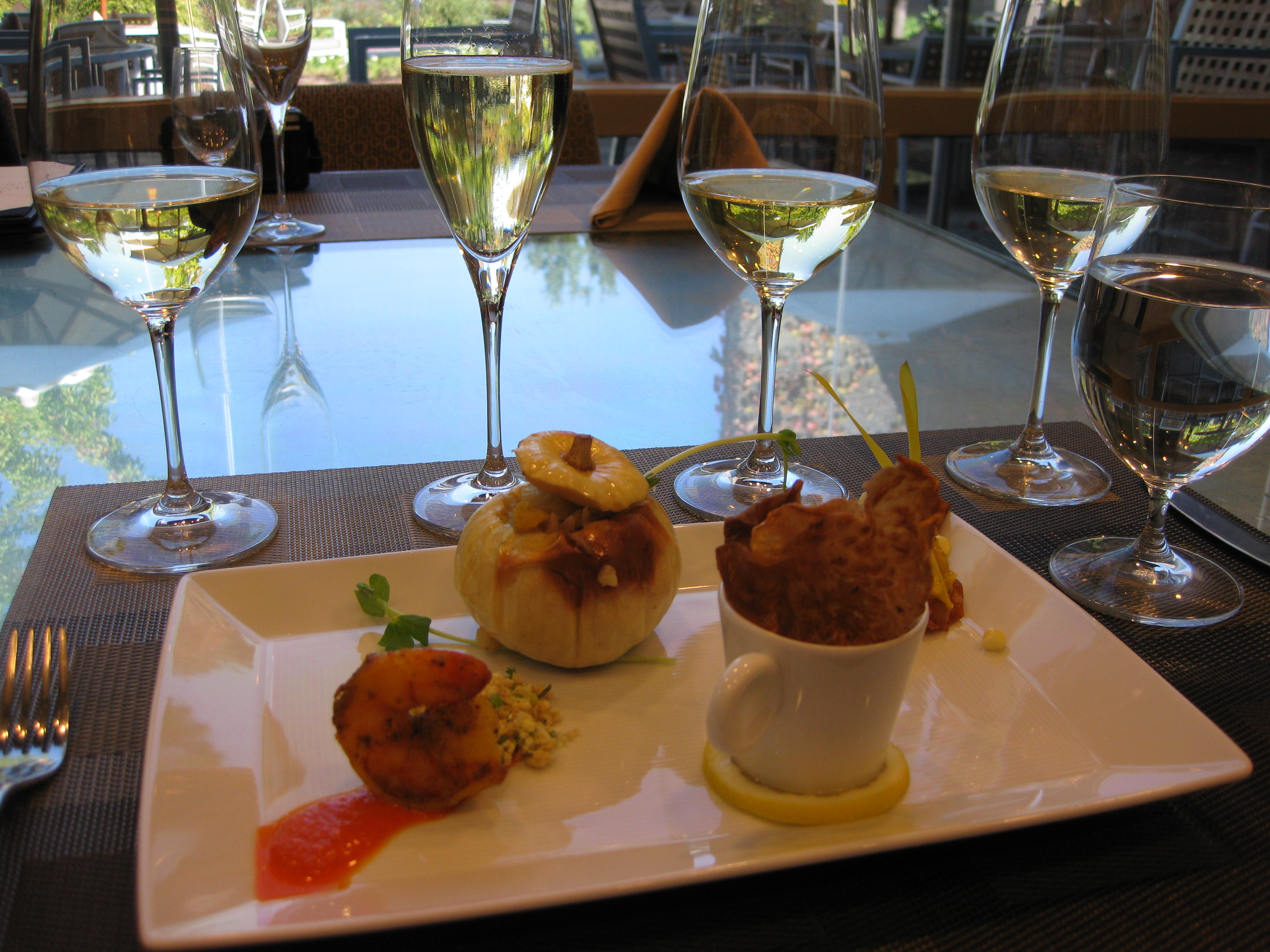
A selection of dégustation dishes and wines

Dégustation is the careful, appreciative tasting of various food, focusing on the gustatory system, the senses, and high culinary art. Dégustation is more likely to involve sampling small portions of all of a chef's signature dishes in one sitting. Usually consisting of many courses, it may be accompanied by a matching wine degustation which complements each dish.

== History ==
The French term dégustation is still commonly used in English-language contexts. Modern dégustation probably comes from the French kitchens of the early 20th century and is different from earlier meals with many courses because these meals were served as full-sized meals at each course.

== Examples ==
Sampling a selection of cheeses, at home or in a restaurant, may also be called a dégustation. Three to four varieties are normally chosen, generally including a semi-soft cheese, a goat's cheese, and a blue cheese. The stronger varieties are normally tasted last.

A six course dégustation may include two seafood, red meat and dessert items with matching wines while the same menu could have added a vegetarian item, and any other types of dish to expand the menu to (for example) a nine-course dégustation menu.

The popular Spanish style of tapas is similar to the dégustation style, but is not in itself a complete set menu offering the chefs' signature dishes, but instead offers a variety from which the diner can choose.

== See also ==
- Tasting menu
- Formal dinner
- Omakase
- Coffee cupping
- Tea tasting
- Wine tasting
