= Speibecken =

Basin to vomit into

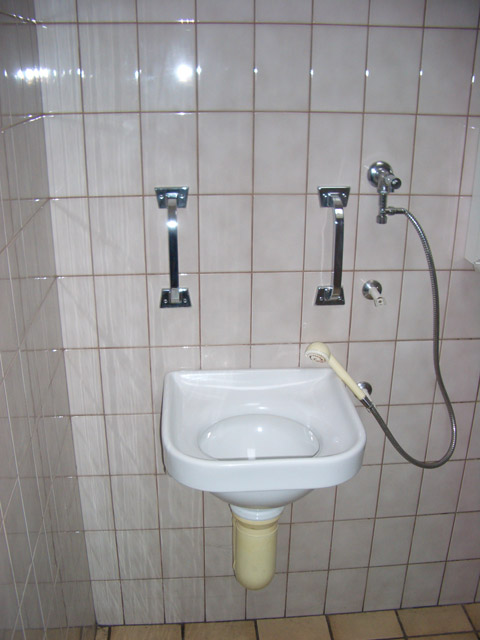
A Speibecken

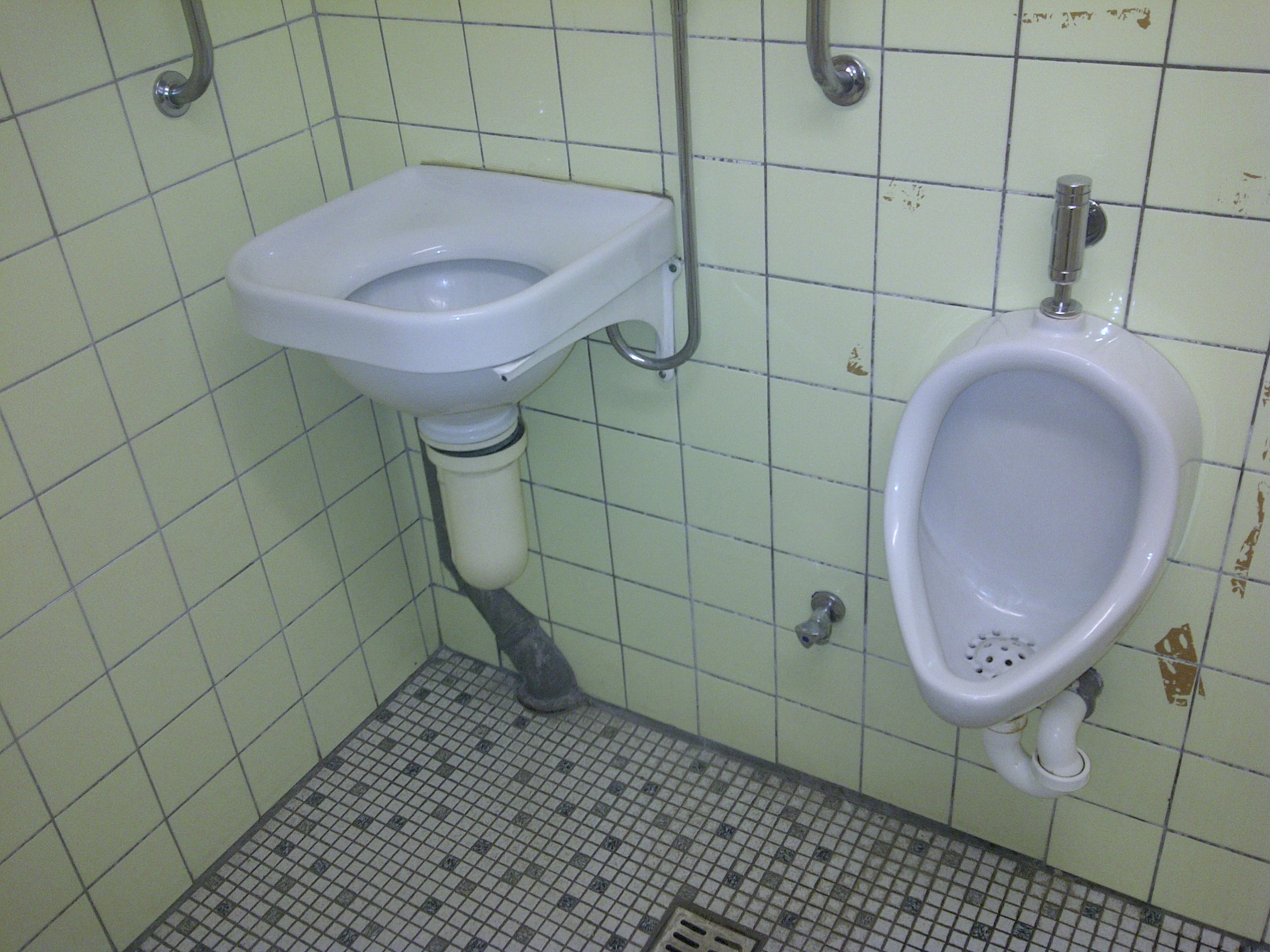
A Speibecken next to a urinal at the VLB Berlin

A Speibecken or Kotzbecken is a basin for people to vomit into. These sinks are installed in some bars, restaurants and student fraternities in German-speaking countries as well as in bars in Vietnam.

The Speibecken is often a large ceramic bowl installed at waist height with handles for the user to hold onto and a shower head to flush the unit. They are encountered more often in men's facilities than in women's.

In Germany and Austria they have become associated with the heavy drinking traditions of student fraternities. They have also been provided at supervised injection sites for drug users.

== Names ==
Speibecken comes from the German speien ("to spit" but also "to vomit") and Becken ("bowl, basin"). The term also has the meaning of the traditional spittoon, used by tobacco chewers or in dentist's surgeries. In some parts of Austria and Germany they are known as Kotzbecken (from kotzen, "to puke"). In Vietnam they are called bồn ói [nôn], meaning "puke sink".

Speibecken are nicknamed Papst ("pope") often said to be because people must bow their heads to use them. In some German-speaking regions vomiting is known as papsten ("poping"). The shower head fixed nearby to flush the Speibecken is also nicknamed "large white telephone".
