= Spittoon =

Receptacle made for spitting into

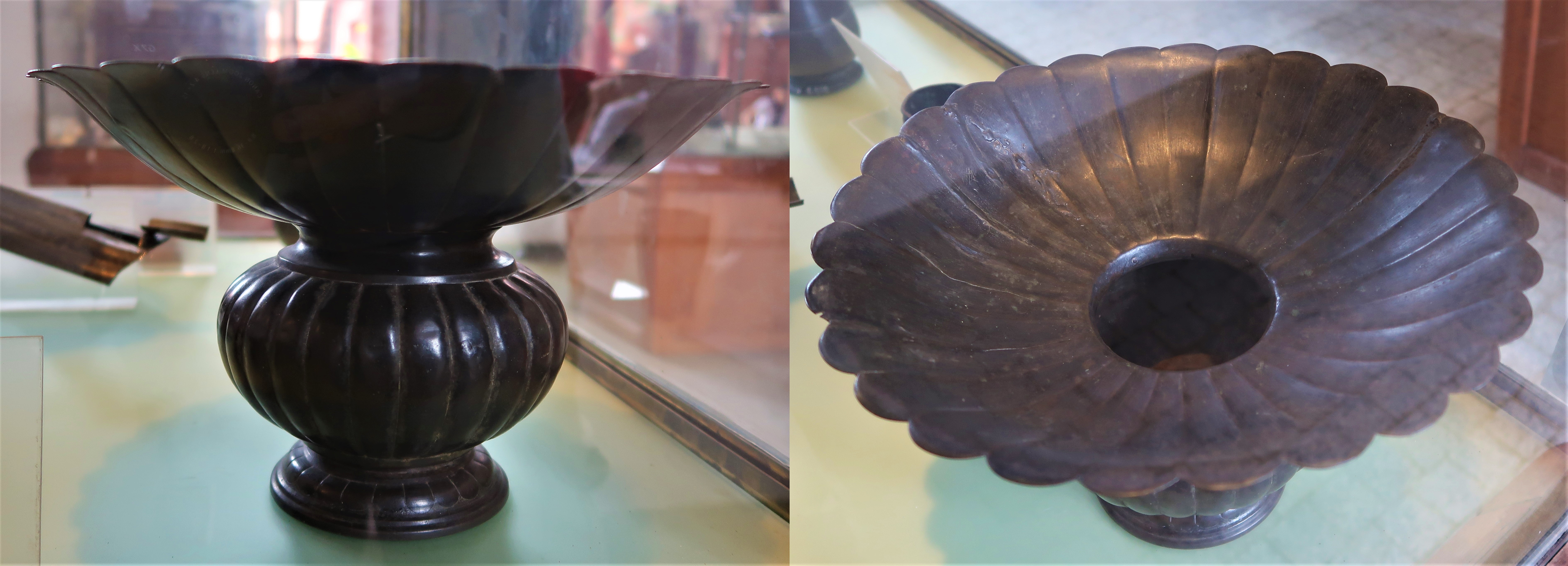
Side and top view of spittoon. On display at the National Museum of Cambodia.

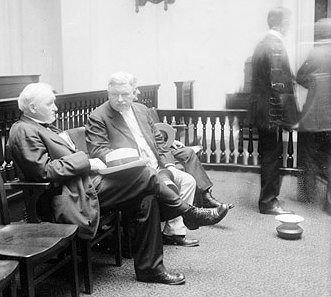
A Chicago courtroom, mid 1910s. A spittoon is seen on the floor at bottom right.

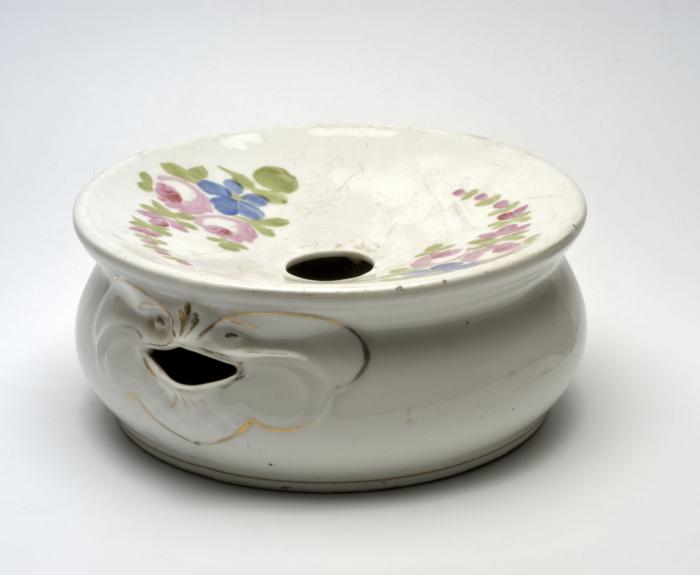
Decorated Surinam porcelain spittoon. Note this type of spittoon has a spout hole on the side for emptying.

A spittoon (or spitoon) is a receptacle made for spitting into, especially by users of chewing and dipping tobacco. It is also known as a cuspidor (which is the Portuguese word for 'spitter' or 'spittoon', from the verb cuspir meaning 'to spit'), although that term is also used for a type of spitting sink used in dentistry.

== United States in the 19th century ==
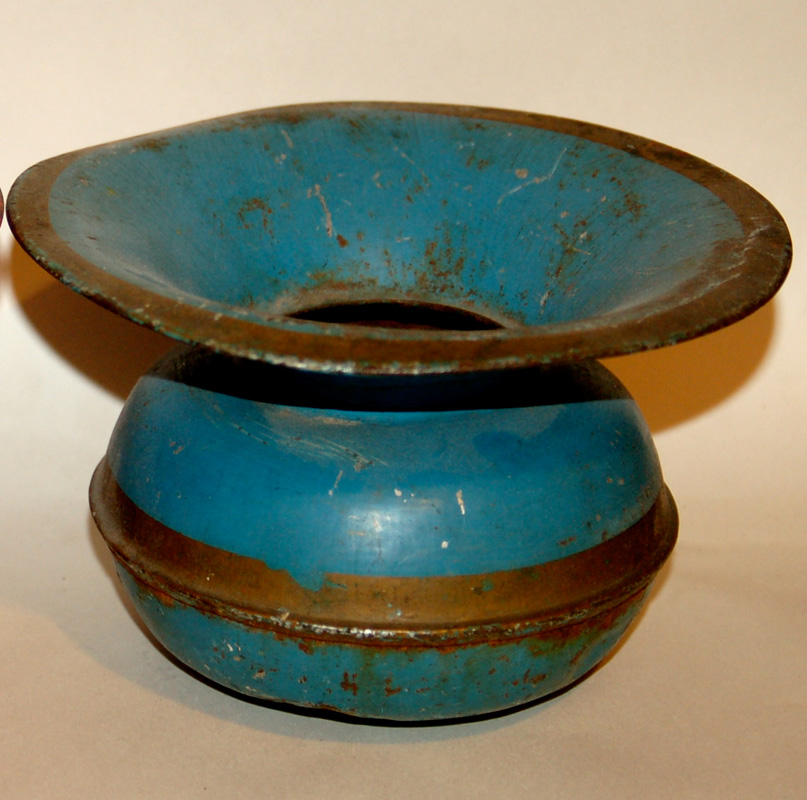
Early 20th century toleware spittoon

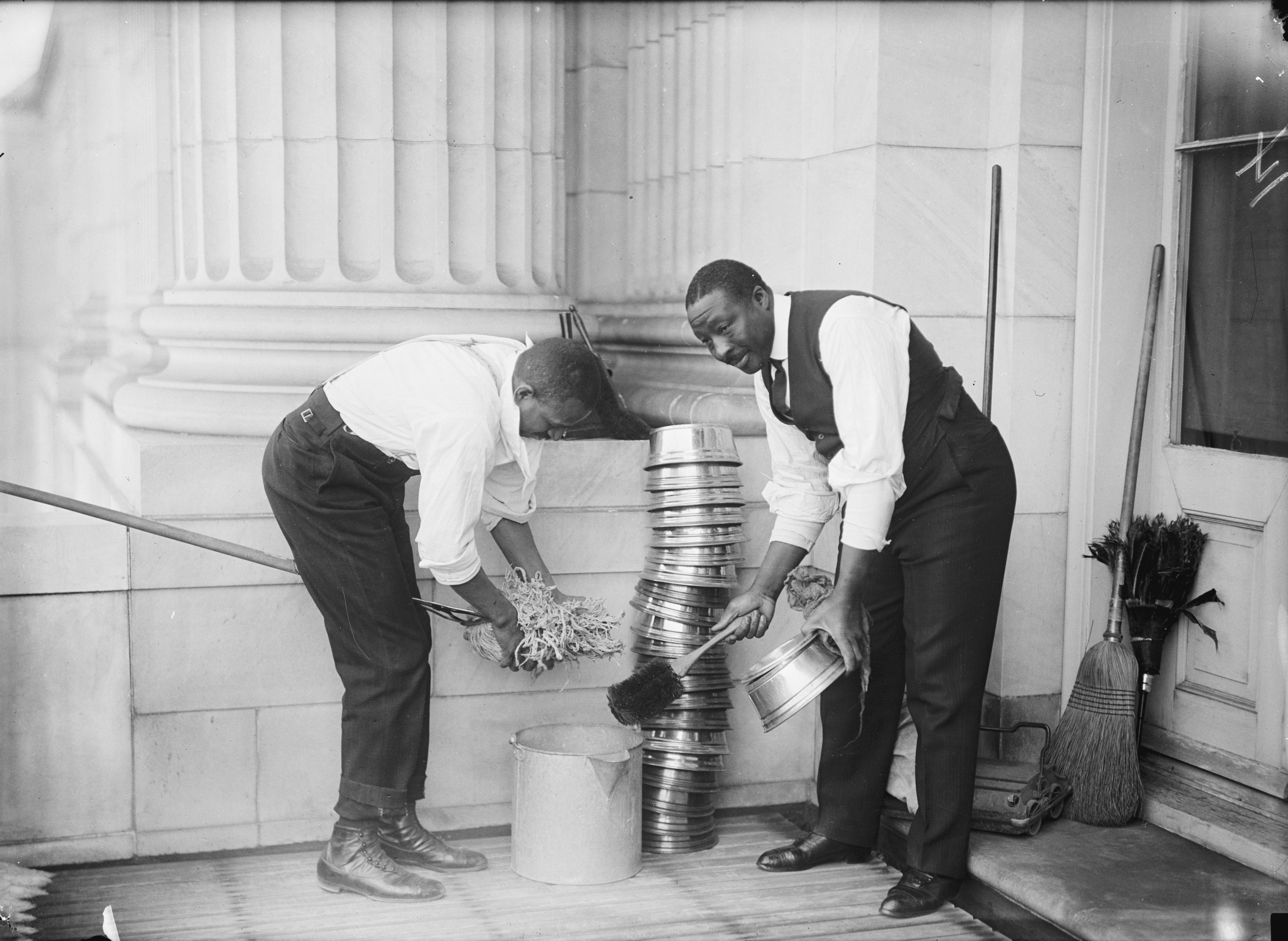
Janitors at the United States Capitol with stack of spittoons, 1914

In the late 19th century, spittoons became a common feature of pubs, brothels, saloons, hotels, stores, banks, railway carriages, and other places where people (especially adult men) gathered, notably in the United States, but allegedly also in Australia.

Brass was the most common material for spittoons. Other materials used for mass production of spittoons ranged from basic functional iron to elaborately crafted cut glass and fine porcelain. At higher class places like expensive hotels, spittoons could be elaborately decorated.

Spittoons are flat-bottomed, often weighted to minimize tipping over, and often with an interior "lip" to make spilling less likely if they tip. Some have lids, but this is rare. Some have holes, sometimes with a plug, to aid in draining and cleaning.

Use of spittoons was considered an advance of public manners and health, intended to replace previously common spitting on floors, streets, and sidewalks. Many places passed laws against spitting in public other than into a spittoon.

Boy Scout troops organized campaigns to paint "Do not Spit on the Sidewalk" notices on city sidewalks. In 1909 in Cincinnati, Ohio, scout troops together with members of the Anti-Tuberculosis League painted thousands of such messages in a single night. A mass-produced sign seen in saloons read:

If you expect to rate as a gentleman Do not expectorate on the floor

Spittoons were also useful for people suffering from tuberculosis who would cough up phlegm. Public spittoons would sometimes contain a solution of an antiseptic such as carbolic acid with the aim of limiting transmission of disease. With the start of the 20th century medical doctors urged tuberculosis sufferers to use personal pocket spittoons instead of public ones; these were small jars/flasks with tight-fitting lids which people could carry with them to spit into. Similar devices are still used by some tuberculosis sufferers.

After the 1918 flu epidemic, both hygiene and etiquette advocates began to disparage public use of the spittoon, and use began to decline. Chewing gum replaced tobacco as the favorite chew of the younger generation. Cigarettes were considered more hygienic than spit-inducing chewing tobacco. While it was still not unusual to see spittoons in some public places in parts of the US as late as the 1930s, vast numbers of old brass spittoons met their ends in the scrap drives of World War II.

A large public collection of spittoons can be found at Duke Homestead State Historic Site Durham, North Carolina. In 2008, the site's tobacco museum added 282 spittoons—claimed to be the world's largest collection—to its holdings of over 100.

== In Chinese society ==
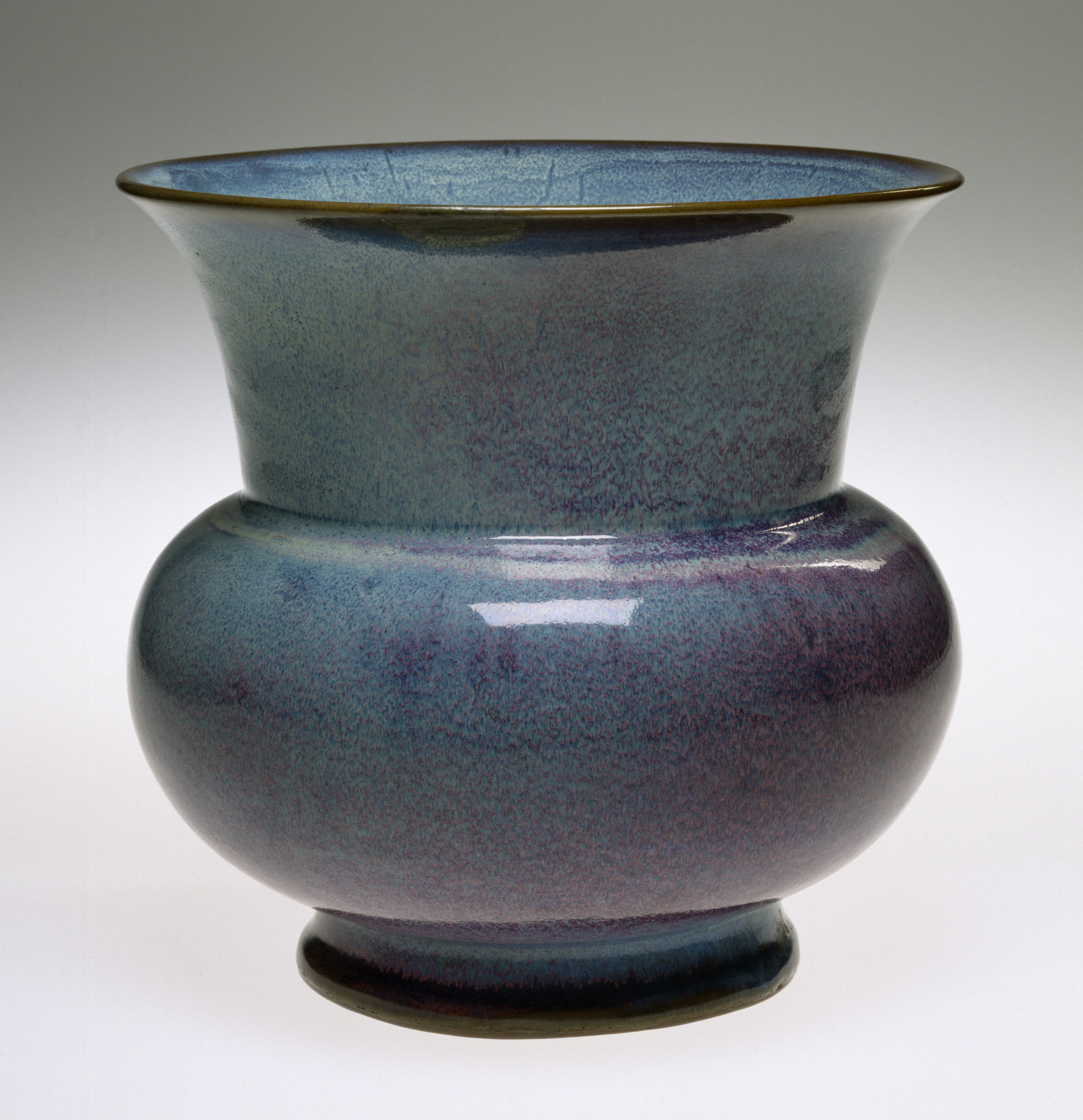
Spittoon, 14th Century. The Walters Art Museum.

Spittoons have been used in China for a long time; the earliest porcelain spittoon was found in a tomb dating to Emperor Xianzong's reign during the Tang dynasty. During the Qing dynasty and later in Japan, a golden spittoon would be among the numerous objects displayed in front of the emperor at major ceremonies.

After China became a Communist state in 1949, the spittoon became much more prevalent: spittoons were placed at every conceivable public place, and were commonplace in homes as well. The mass introduction of spittoons was no doubt a public hygiene initiative, motivated by a desire to curtail the still common Chinese practice of spitting onto the floor. The spittoons used in China were typically made of white porcelain, sometimes with traditional Chinese art painted onto the exterior.

Spittoons were used even during official functions by the political leaders of China; especially when Deng Xiaoping had a frequent use of spittoon with other political leaders. This eventually became a source of ridicule by the mass media outside China. As a response, the spittoons have largely been withdrawn from public spaces in China since the late 1980s.

In May 2015, the Spittoon Collective came into being, probably the largest English-language literary collectives in China. They publish the Spittoon literary magazine.

== Latter-day models ==
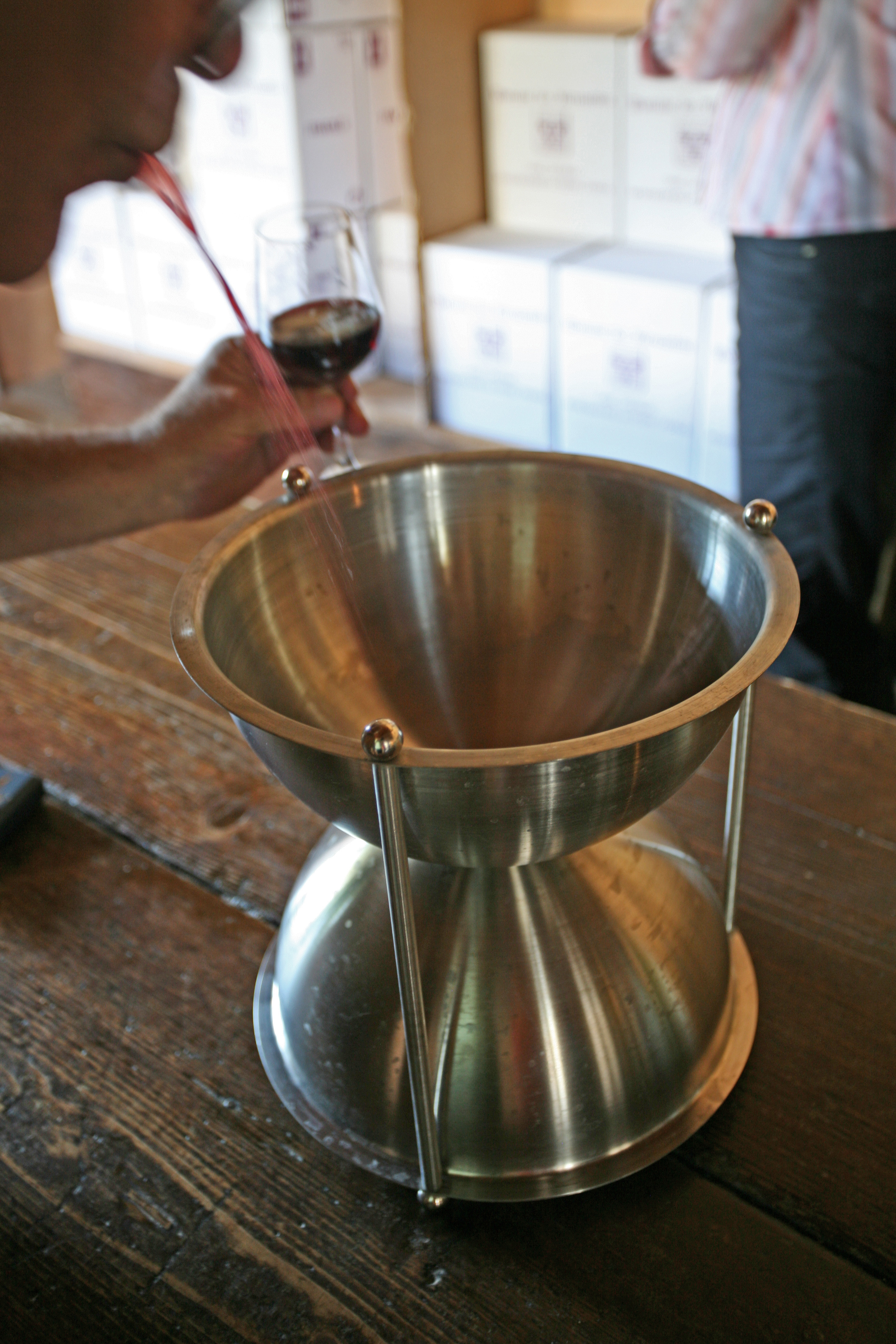
Spitting into a spittoon at a wine tasting

While spittoons are still made, they are no longer commonly found in public places (except as decorations). There are a few companies that currently make spittoons for users of smokeless tobacco, such as MudJug, Spitbud, and Mud Bud by DC Crafts Nation. Professions in which spittoons are commonly used are coffee, tea and wine tasting. A taster will sip samples and then spit them into a spittoon in order to avoid intoxication. Makeshift spittoons, such as large mixing bowls, can be used by people with a cold who are frequently coughing up phlegm.

Spittoons remained in use in the Southern United States in public buildings at least until the 1970s. For example, the Georgia Capitol Museum in the Georgia Capitol Building in Atlanta, Georgia, has on display a spittoon of the type that was used in legislative sessions into the 1970s.

The United States Senate also had spittoons spread across the Senate Chamber, which are now in protective boxes, as they are considered a Senate tradition. Similarly, each Justice on the United States Supreme Court has a spittoon next to his or her seat in the courtroom. However, the spittoons function merely as wastebaskets; the last time the spittoon was used for its customary purpose was in the early 20th century.

== See also ==
- Inkjet spittoon
- Speibecken
- Chamber pot
