= Sunalini Menon =

Sunalini Menon (2007)
- Education: University of Madras
- Occupation: Coffee quality control expert

Sunalini Menon is an Indian coffee quality control expert and entrepreneur.

== Early life and education ==
Menon started her career in the coffee industry following graduation in Food Technology from the University of Madras in 1972.

== Career ==
Menon's career began at the Coffee Board of India, where she was trained in the practice of coffee cupping and quality evaluation. Following this instruction, she became one of the first female coffee tasters in Asia as well as the first female quality control director for Indian coffee at the Coffee Board of India, where she helped in the formulation of quality standards for Indian coffee, besides launching speciality coffees to the world market. She also served as a Coffee Corps Volunteer of the Coffee Quality Institute (CQI), before she was designated as a member of the Board of Trustees of the CQI.

In 1996, when the market for Indian coffee was liberalised, Sunalini helped in the setting up of a coffee production group named ‘Coffeelab’ in Bangalore. The laboratory was the first of its kind to be established in the private sector in India, providing comprehensive quality related services not only for the domestic coffee industry, but also for coffees from various producing origins (such as in Africa and America) and consuming countries. The lab undertakes the training of personnel in coffee cupping.

Menon has developed several green coffee brands and has served as a judge in coffee competitions. She also is a writer of coffee articles and acts as a guide to entrepreneurs new to the industry. Moreover, Menon has conducted workshops and attended international conferences.

Her involvement in coffee quality worldwide has prompted her to conduct workshops and attend international workshops on coffee production and testing. Menon has created a training platform aiming to educate workers in all aspects of the coffee value chain on coffee quality.

She currently teaches the ‘Masters Course on Coffee Science and Economics’ at the Universita del Café, Trieste under the Ernesto Illy Foundation and the University of Udine. She is additionally a director on the Board of the Speciality Coffee Association of America and previously was an independent director of M/s. Tata Coffee Ltd., the largest integrated coffee company.

== Awards ==
Menon has received several awards for her work, including from the Speciality Coffee Association of India, Speciality Coffee Association of America, the CQI, the International Women's Coffee Alliance (IWCA) of which she served as president, and the Speciality Coffee Association of Europe.

Her awards include:

- Jewels of Karnataka – Eminent Woman of Substance 2016, presented by the Association of Women Entrepreneurs of Karnataka (AWAKE) for being the first recognised Asian female coffee tester.
- First Lady Achievers Award from the President of India, awarded at the “Women of Worth Karnataka 2018” by AWAKE by the Indian President at Bangalore in March 2018.
- Recognition and “Top Professor” Award Certificate of the Universita Del Caffe
- Illycaffe Award at the 4th Annual Ernesto Illy International Coffee Award held at New York, in November 2019.
- “Outstanding Achievement Award” in the 16th Annual Sprudgie Awards 2025 presented by Sprudge and Pacific Barista Series.
