= Bohni =

Custom of North India and Pakistan

Bohni (Hindustani: बोहनी or بوہنی) is a social and commercial custom of India and Pakistan that is based on the belief that the first sale of a day (or other selling period) establishes the seller's luck for subsequent choti transactions during the remainder of the day. In practical terms this means that sellers try to ensure that the first (or bohni) sale happens on a cash-only basis, and ideally without any discounts (i.e. at full-price), though the social protocol associated with bohni sales varies by region. Unless the price is egregious, it is considered good manners for customers to be generous if they are engaged in a bohni transaction with the seller. If the buyer is trusted, the seller will sometimes allow the buyer to state a price that is binding on both, with the expectation that the buyer will demonstrate generosity.

== Variations in the custom ==
Although sellers have a daily bohni, the concept also applies to sales at the beginning of a calendar year or at the launch of an enterprise. Often, for a newly launched business, family or friends of the seller will make a bohni purchase in an attempt to secure luck for the new business. Depending on individual beliefs, some sellers may pass on smaller transactions until they secure a large-enough bohni sale, while others may lower prices in an attempt to complete a bohni sale as soon as possible. In some areas, it is considered rude to ask the seller to make change during a bohni sale, as any outflow of cash during the bohni can spoil the seller's luck for the remainder of the day.

In some regions, it is considered inauspicious to allow the first prospective customer to walk away without a sale being completed. To prevent this, the first potential buyer that engages with a seller may receive special treatment, such as being offered a seat at the shop and a cup of tea, or a freebie being included with the sale.

== Treatment of bohni proceeds ==
Some regions and communities in North India and Pakistan have developed specific practices in how the money made in a bohni transaction is treated. Sometimes the bohni money is spit upon, which is a custom believed to ward-off nazar (evil eye). Alternatively, the seller may apply the bohni cash to each eye in turn, which denotes reverence and thankfulness.
