= Cherry pit spitting =

Amateur sport

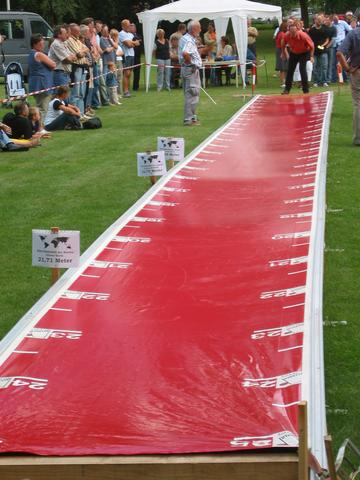
Cherry pit spitting world championship in Düren, Germany

Cherry pit spitting is the act of spitting, or ejecting, the pit (the seed) of a cherry from one's mouth with great speed so as to send the pit a great distance. Spitting cherry pits is an amateur sport; there are no known professional leagues of cherry spitters.

There are multiple international competitions for cherry pit spitting in countries such as the US, Canada, Germany and France. The sport can be traced back many decades.

In most competitions a contestant is given a cherry; this is done to prevent cheating or pit tampering, seen in the Witzenhausen competition in which cherry pits were tampered with. The pit is accessed by eating the cherry around it, then the cherry seed is spat. The pit of a cherry is very small, about the size of a front tooth, and is very slippery when first removed from the cherry, making it easy to spit. According to the Guinness Book of Records, the record cherry pit spitting distance is 28.51 metres (93 ft 6.5 in), set in 2004 by Brian "Young Gun" Krause.

== Notable contests ==
=== International Cherry Pit-Spitting Championship ===
The International Cherry Pit-Spitting Championship held just outside Eau Claire, Michigan, US, was founded in 1974 by Herb Teichman, the owner of the Tree-Mendus Fruit Farm to raise awareness for both his farm and the tart cherry harvest. The contest ran for 45 years from 1974 until 2019 as the farm where the contest takes place has since been sold, thus ending the Michigan competition.

Each contestant was allowed to pick three cherries and, one at a time, chew around the cherry pit. They then stood with their feet against a line and spat the cherry seed as far in front of them as they could. The contestant was given three attempts, after which the longest spit was measured. The competition had multiple categories to compete in including the adult male and female categories as well as the youth categories of youth under 5, youth 6–8 and youth 9–12 categories.

It was at this competition where Brian "Young Gun" Krause claimed his Guinness World Record in 2004 for the longest distance to spit a cherry pit.

=== Canadian National Pit Spit Championship ===
The Canadian National Pit Spit Championship is held annually as a part of the Blenheim Cherry Fest in Blenheim, Ontario, Canada. The competition has been a part of the festival since 1981. The contest originated at a cherry festival run by the Cedar Springs Cherry Co-operative, however in 1994 the farming town of Blenheim took over and joined with the July sidewalk sale.

=== Witzenhausen Cherry Pip Spitting Competition ===
The German town of Witzenhausen in Germany, a large producer of the countries cherries is also home to a cherry pip spit competition in their annual cherry fair. In addition to the annual competition there is a lane for cherry spitting which remains year round at Diebesturm. The Witzenhausen Cherry pit spit competition was previously involved in a scandal regarding cherry pit tampering. The head of the Witzenhausen organising committee Ulrich Walger said: "After the competition we found manipulated cherry stones on the spitting range". Further inquiry revealed that a competitor has slit open the pip then inserted metal shots and covered it with a filler then varnish. The organisers were unable to identify the culprit and as a result annulled the champions.

=== Young NSW National Cherry Festival ===
The annual National Cherry festival in Young, New South Wales, Australia, features a cherry pip spitting competition, held in early December every year. Contestants are required to pick a cherry randomly from a box then spit the cherry pip as far as possible. Young is known as the cherry capital of Australia, responsible for over 60% of all Australian cherries. There is a junior and senior division, with cash prizes of $50 AUD for the junior category and $100 AUD for the senior category. The 2019 competition had close to 60 entrants participated, each contestant was given 2 pips to spit. Simon Taboury won the men's division with a distance of 11.6 metres (38 ft 1 in), Cherie McAllister won the ladies title by spitting her pip 7.5 metres (24 ft 7 in) and Ronan Winfield won the children's category with a distance of 5.4 metres (17 ft 9 in).

=== Manjimup Cherry Spit ===
The Manjimup cherry spit competition is an annual event at the Manjimup Cherry Harmony Festival, an annual festival since 2001 in Western Australia, attracting between 7000 and 8000 people in 2017. The cherry festival is held in December and celebrates the start of the Cherry season. The cherry pip spitting contest is made of a round of heats and then finals later in the day. The event is sponsored by GlobeVista, who has previously provided the winner of the cherry pip spitting contest to New Zealand to compete for the title of Australasian Cherry Pip Spit Champion. Clinton Thompson, a Perth resident has won the competition multiple times including the 2012, 2014 and 2017 competitions. An ABC news article states that the 2014 prize was "a ticket to the festival's Long Table Lunch, $150 in cash and a ticket to New Zealand to compete in the New Zealand Cherry Pip Spitting Competition". In 2017, Manjimups victor Clayton Ellis was sponsored by GlobeVista to compete in the New Zealand Olive Stone Spitting competition, which replaced the cherry stone spitting competition after a relocation of the annual Ford Ranger New Zealand Rural Games from "the cherry capital in Central Otago to Palmerston North" Ellis claimed the national record at the New Zealand Olive Stone Spitting competition with a winning distance of 12.64 metres (41 ft 6 in).

=== Western Regional Cherry Pit Spit ===
The Western Regional Cherry Pit Spit is an annual contest held at Rowley's Red Barn in Utah, US, that has been running since 2007. The competition includes two heats, the first round is open to all and includes a male and female division as well as youth age group divisions of 5 and under, 6–8 years, 9–12 years and 13–15 years. The finals round includes the top 10 spitters from the male and female entrant and the top 5 spitters from the youth age group divisions.

=== Annakirmes (St. Anne’s Fair) ===
The Annakirmes or St Anne's Fair is held annually in Düren Germany. The fair began in 1715 and the first world championship of cherry-pit-long-spitting at the festival occurred in 1974 on a police dogs training ground. The cherry pit spitting event celebrated its 40th anniversary in 2014 and held a special event for selected teams.

=== Céret Cherry Festival ===
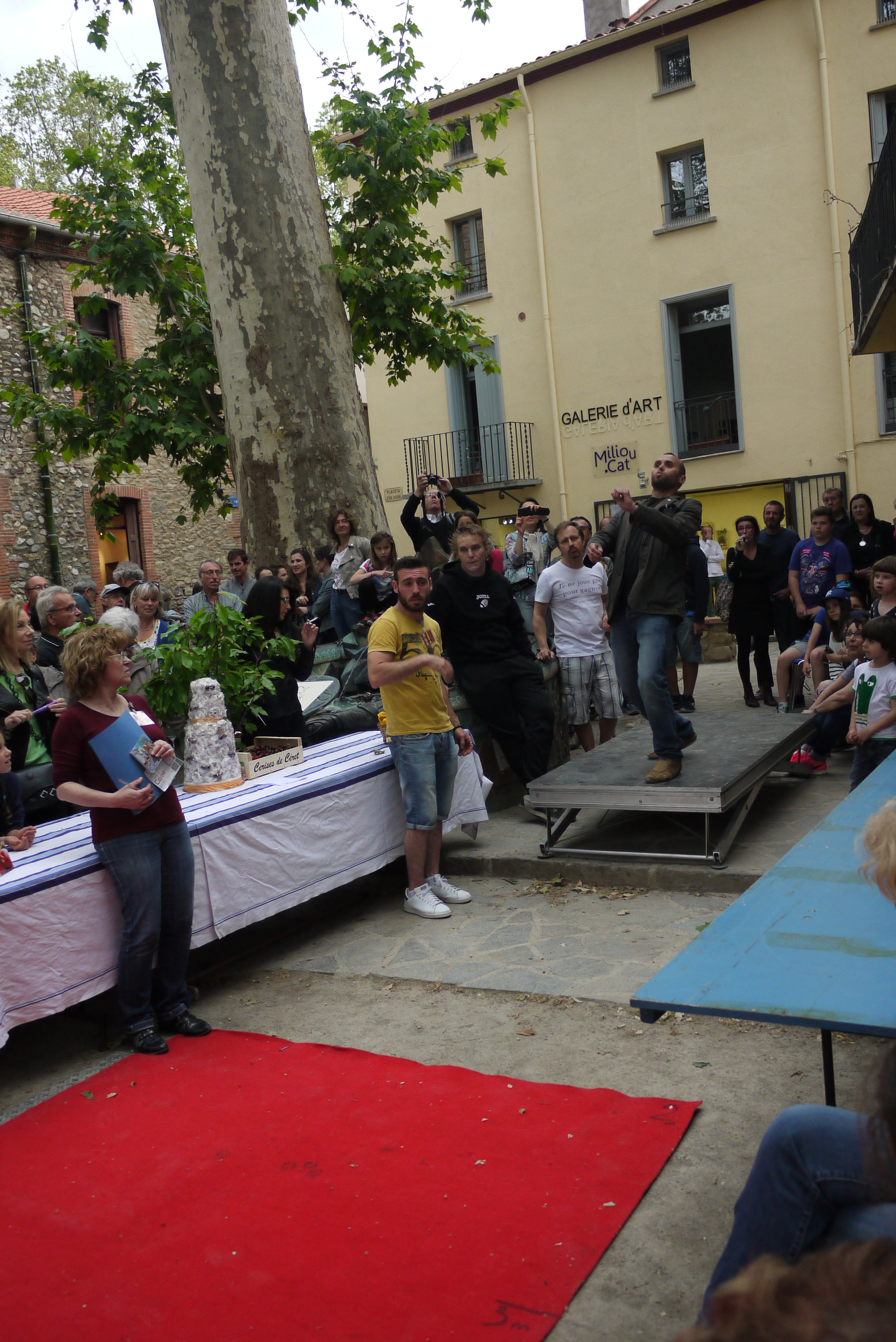
Cherry pit spitting in Céret

The Céret Cherry Festival occurs annually in France at the end of May, including a cherry stone spitting competition as well as music, dancing and food.

== Notable contestants ==
There are many notable contestants and champions within the different competitions held around the world.

Rick "Pellet Gun" Krause is a 19-time champion cherry pit spitter at the International Cherry Pit-Spitting Championship at Tree-Mendus Fruit Farm.

Marlene Krause, wife of Rick Krause, is a seven-time winner of the women's contest at the International Cherry Pit-Spitting Championship competition at the Tree-Mendus fruit farm in Eau Claire, Michigan. She and her husband both won consecutively in 2009 and 2010.

Brian "Young Gun" Krause, son of Rick Krause, is best known for being the current Guinness world record holder for the longest distance to spit a cherry pit for a distance of 28.51 metres (93 ft 6.5 in) at the 2004 International Cherry Pit-Spitting championship.

"Gentleman Joe" Lessard Sr. is a well-known competitor in both the Eau Claire, Michigan, and Blenheim, Ontario, competitions. In 2013 he was a 3-time champion of the International cherry Pit-Spitting Championship in Michigan. He won his three titles in 1986, 1993 and 1996 with a distance of 21.9 metres (71 ft 10 in)

Kevin Bartz is well known for being the 2019 international cherry pit spitting champion in 2019 with a distance of 16.5 metres (54 ft 2 in); he began competition at age ten and won the youth division as well as being the men's division champion twice.

Chloe Bartz is the daughter of Kevin Bartz and is a three time international women's division champion, most recently in 2019.

Martin Salter "The Phantom of the Orchard" was the winner of the Canadian Pit Spit Championship in 2001 with a distance of 15.85 m (52.0 ft) and placed fourth in the International competition held in Michigan the same year. He won his first Canadian title in 1992 and gained his nickname as he used to wear a costume.

Clinton Thompson was the winner of the Manjimup Cherry Spit in Young NSW three times, in 2012, 2014 and 2017. As a result of his 2014 victory, he was flown to New Zealand to compete in the New Zealand Cherry Pip Spitting Competition.

Clayton Ellis is the winner of the 2016 Manjimup Cherry Spit with a distance of 9.2m. He is also the victor of the 2017 New Zealand Olive Stone Spitting competition, with a distance of 12.64m.

== Guinness World Record ==
The Guinness World Record for the "Greatest distance to spit a cherry stone" is held by Brian "Young Gun" Krause for a spit of 28.51 metres (93 ft 6.5 in) at the 2004 International Cherry Pit-Spitting championship. Krause also competed in the freestyle competition on the same day where he spat a stone 33.62 metres (110 ft 3.5 in), unofficially beating his own record.

== Media coverage ==
Cherry pit spitting has been covered frequently in the media including news and television coverage.

The 46th Annual International Cherry Pit-Spitting Championship in 2019 was streamed live on ESPN8: The Ocho in March 2020. This was aired in a 24-hour slot in which many miscellaneous sports were played in light of the COVID-19 pandemic causing the suspension and cancellation of many other sporting leagues.

The International Cherry Pit-Spitting Championship has also been featured on the website of The Wall Street Journal. and in an article on ESPN about the competition and the Bartz family.

== See also ==
- Traverse City Pit Spitters, baseball team
