= Coffee cupping =

Practice of observing the tastes and aromas of brewed coffee

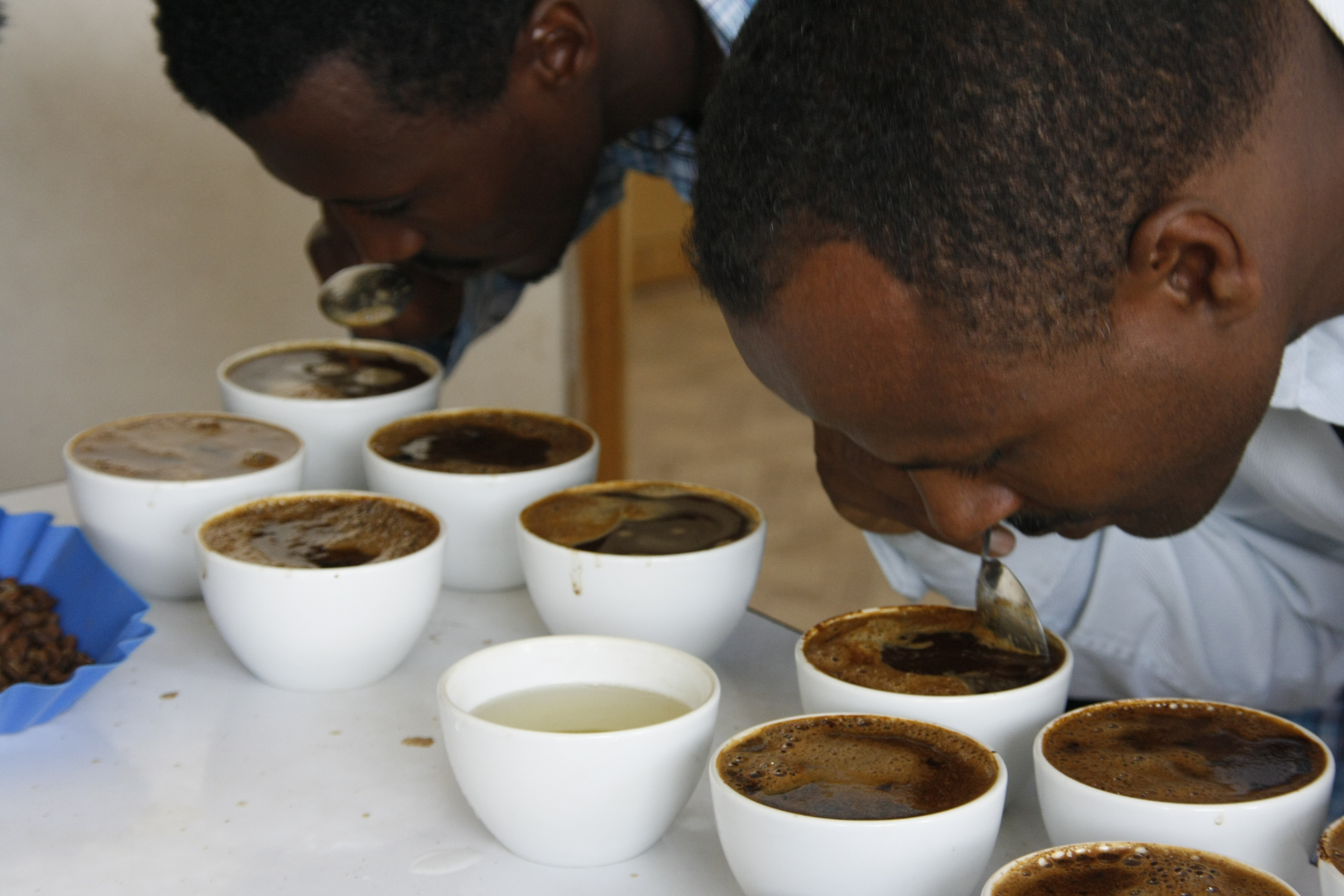
Coffee cuppers reviewing aromas

Coffee cupping, or coffee tasting, is the practice of observing the tastes and aromas of brewed coffee. It is a professional practice but can be done informally by anyone or by professionals known as "Q Graders". A standard coffee cupping procedure involves deeply sniffing the coffee, then slurping the coffee from a spoon so it is aerated and spread across the tongue. The coffee taster attempts to measure aspects of the coffee's taste, specifically the body (the texture or mouthfeel, such as oiliness), sweetness, acidity (a sharp and tangy feeling, like when biting into an orange), flavour (the characters in the cup), and aftertaste. Since coffee beans embody telltale flavours from the region where they were grown, cuppers may attempt to identify the coffee's origin.

== Aromas ==
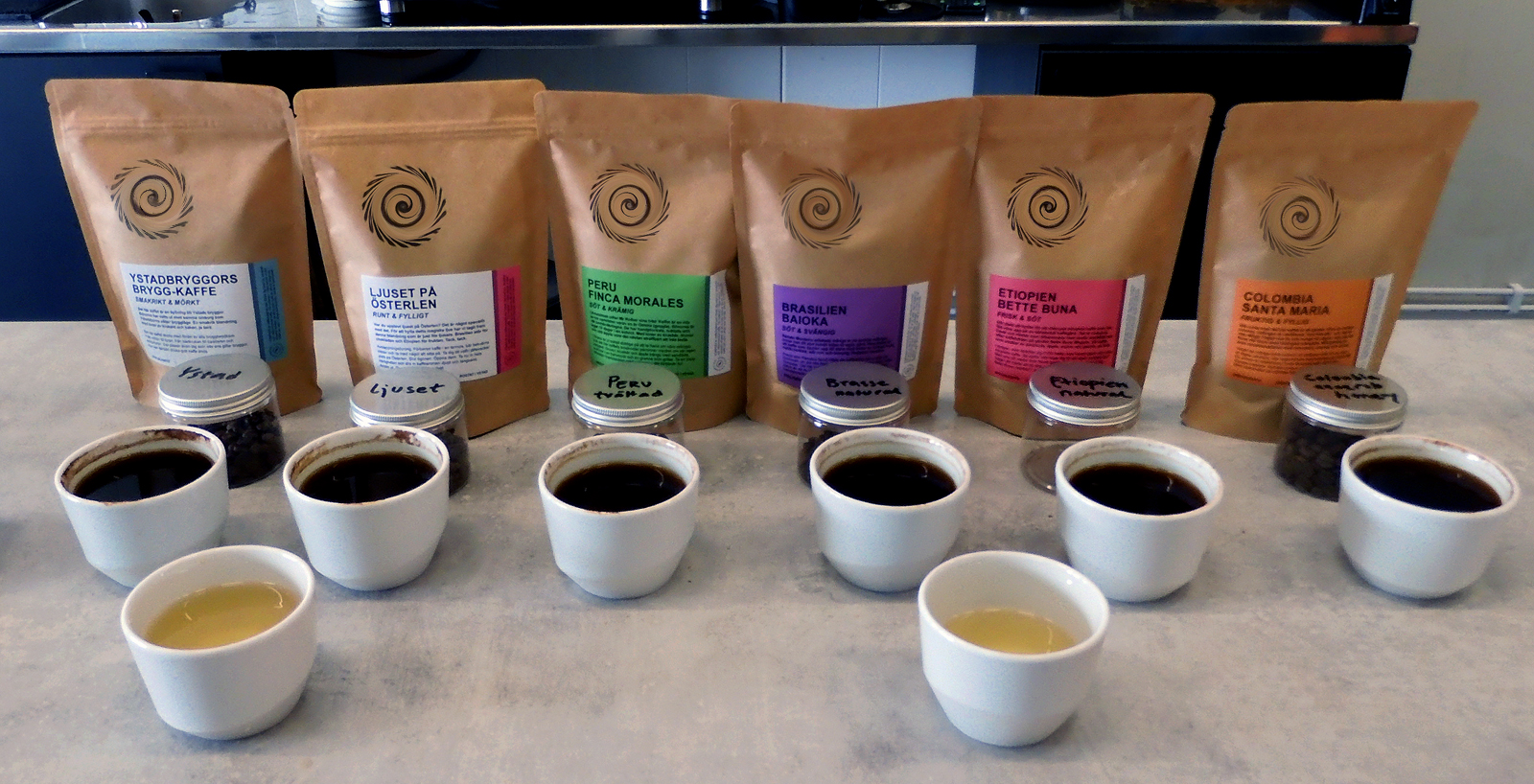
An arrangement for Cupping in Sweden 2024.

The approximate amount of coffee a cupper takes onto the spoon (a so-called cupping spoon) and slurps up is 4–5 milliliters.

Various descriptions are used to note coffee aroma.

Animal-like
This odour descriptor is somewhat reminiscent of the smell of animals. It is not a fragrant aroma like musk but has the characteristic odour of wet fur, sweat, leather, hides or urine. It is not necessarily considered as a negative attribute but is generally used to describe strong notes. These flavors can be present in poor-quality dry process coffees.
Ashy
This odour descriptor is similar to that of an ashtray, the odour of smokers' fingers or the smell one gets when cleaning out a fireplace. It is not used as a negative attribute. Generally speaking this descriptor is used by the tasters to indicate the degree of roast.
Burnt/Smoky
This odour and flavour descriptor is similar to that found in burnt food. The odour is associated with smoke produced when burning wood. This descriptor is frequently used to indicate the degree of roast commonly found by tasters in dark-roasted or oven-roasted coffees.
Chemical/Medicinal
This odour descriptor is reminiscent of chemicals, medicines and the smell of hospitals. This term is used to describe coffees having aromas such as rio flavour, chemical residues or highly aromatic coffees which produce large amounts of volatiles.
Chocolate-like
This aroma descriptor is reminiscent of the aroma and flavour of cocoa powder and chocolate (including dark chocolate and milk chocolate). It is an aroma that is sometimes referred to as sweet.
Caramel
This aroma descriptor is reminiscent of the odour and flavour produced when caramelizing sugar without burning it. Tasters should be cautioned not to use this attribute to describe a burning note.
Cereal/Malty/Toast-like
This descriptor includes aromas characteristic of cereal, malt, and toast. It includes scents such as the aroma and flavour of uncooked or roasted grain (including roasted corn, barley or wheat), malt extract and the aroma and flavour of freshly baked bread and freshly made toast. This descriptor has a common denominator, a grain-type aroma. The aromas in this descriptor were grouped together since tasters used these terms interchangeably when evaluating standards of each one.
Earthy
The characteristic odour of fresh, wet soil or humus. Sometimes associated with moulds and reminiscent of raw potato flavour, a common flavour note in coffees from Asia.
Floral
This aroma descriptor is similar to the fragrance of flowers. It is associated with the slight scent of different types of flowers including honeysuckle, jasmine, dandelion and nettles. It is mainly found when an intense fruity or green aroma is perceived but rarely found having a high intensity by itself.
Fruity/Citrussy
This aroma is reminiscent of the odour and taste of fruit. The natural aroma of berries is highly associated with this attribute. The perception of high acidity in some coffees is correlated with the citrus characteristic. Tasters should be cautioned not to use this attribute to describe the aroma of unripe or overripe fruit.
Grassy/Green/Herbal
This aroma descriptor includes three terms which are associated with odours reminiscent of a freshly mown lawn, fresh green grass or herbs, green foliage, green beans or unripe fruit.
Nutty
This aroma is reminiscent of the odour and flavour of fresh nuts (distinct from rancid nuts) and not of bitter almonds.
Rancid/Rotten
This aroma descriptor includes two terms which are associated with odours reminiscent of rancidification and oxidation of several products. Rancid as the main indicator of fat oxidation mainly refers to rancid nuts and rotten is used as an indicator of deteriorated vegetables or non-oily products. Tasters should be cautioned not to apply these descriptors to coffees that have strong notes but no signs of deterioration.
Rubber-like
This odour descriptor is characteristic of the smell of hot tyres, rubber bands and rubber stoppers. It is not considered a negative attribute but has a characteristic strong note highly recognisable in some coffees.
Spicy
This aroma descriptor is typical of the odour of sweet spices such as cloves, cinnamon and allspice. Tasters are cautioned not to use this term to describe the aroma of savoury spices such as pepper, oregano and Indian spices.
Tobacco
This aroma descriptor is reminiscent of the odour and taste of tobacco but should not be used for burnt tobacco.
Winey
This terms is used to describe the combined sensation of smell, taste and mouthfeel experiences when drinking wine. It is generally perceived when a strong acidic or fruity note is found. Tasters should be cautioned not to apply this term to a sour or fermented flavour.
Woody
This aroma descriptor is reminiscent of the smell of dry wood, an oak barrel, dead wood or cardboard paper.

== Taste ==
Acidity
A basic taste characterised by the solution of an organic acid. A desirable sharp and pleasing taste particularly strong with certain origins as opposed to an over-fermented sour taste.
Bitterness
A primary taste characterised by the solution of caffeine, quinine and certain other alkaloids. This taste is considered desirable up to a certain level and is affected by the degree of roast brewing procedures.
Sweetness
This is a basic taste descriptor characterised by solutions of sucrose or fructose which are commonly associated with sweet aroma descriptors such as fruity, chocolate and caramel. It is generally used for describing coffees which are free from off-flavours.
Saltiness
A primary taste characterised by a solution of sodium chloride or other salts.
Sourness
This basic taste descriptor refers to an excessively sharp, biting and unpleasant flavour (such as vinegar or acetic acid). It is sometimes associated with the aroma of fermented coffee. Tasters should be cautious not to confuse this term with acidity which is generally considered a pleasant and desirable taste in coffee.

== Mouthfeel ==
Body
the physical properties of the beverage. A strong but pleasant full mouthfeel characteristic as opposed to being thin. Body can be compared to drinking milk. A heavy body is comparable to whole milk while a light body can be comparable to skim milk.
Astringency
an after-taste sensation consistent with a dry feeling in the mouth, a trait some find undesirable in coffee.

== History ==
Cupping is a traditional practice; in the United States, cupping became a standard industry practice in the late 19th century (in what is retrospectively called the First Wave of American coffee), due to its use by Hills Brothers Coffee of San Francisco.

== Traditional equipment ==
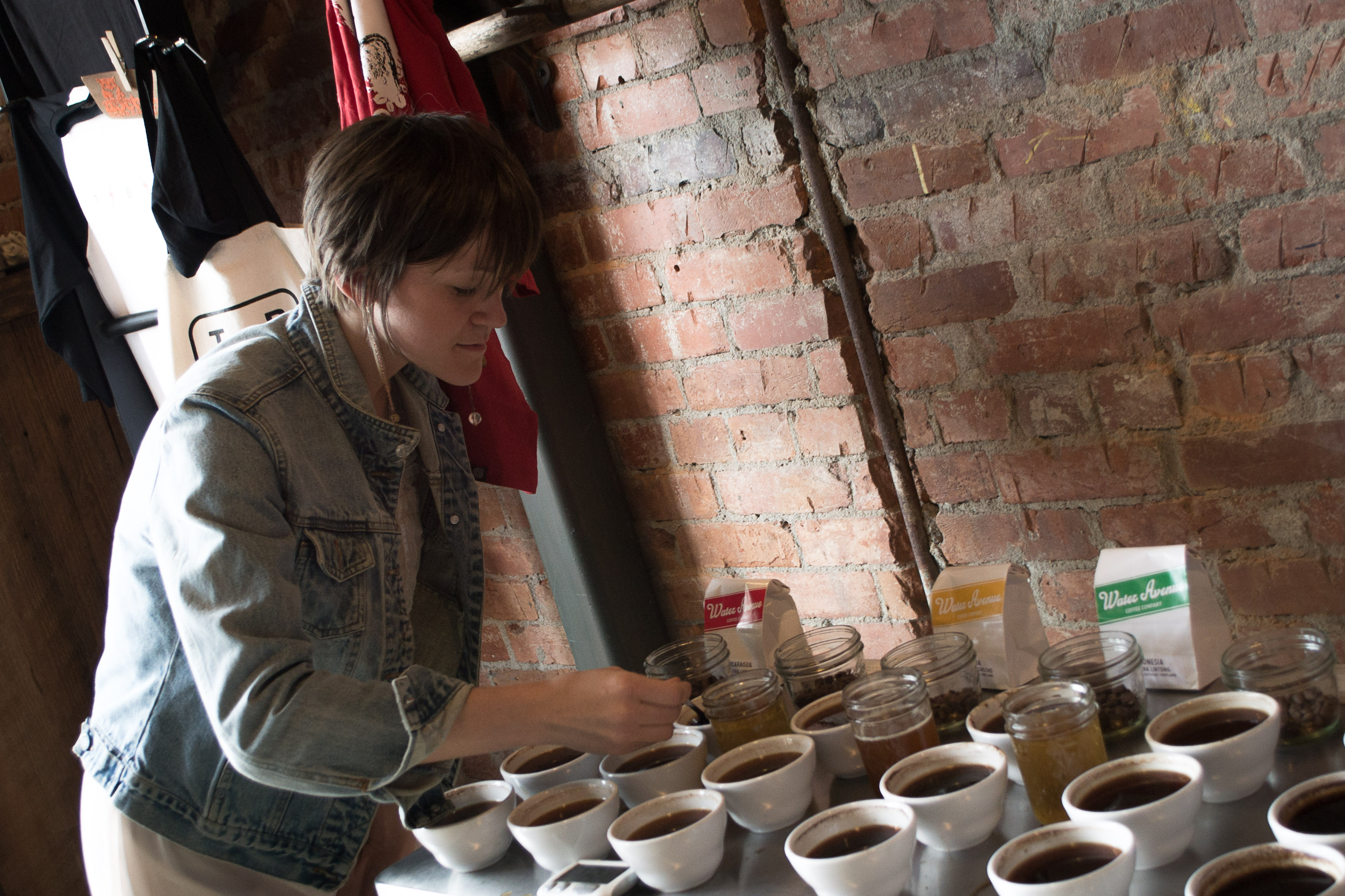
Comparing a few small-batch roastings in Eugene, Oregon

Spittoon
Traditionally a spittoon is used for the taster to expel the sipped cup that is being tasted. The spittoon is typically large and held between the legs of the taster to facilitate spitting.
Spoon
Traditionally a large spoon, such as a soup spoon, is used by the taster. Spoons for cuppings are usually characterized with short handles and deep basins. Each taster typically has an individual spoon for hygiene and for facilitating the tasting experience.
Table
Tables for coffee tasting are traditionally circular, and swivel so that the coffee taster can taste one cup after another in a series of coffees being tasted. Traditionally tasters take turns with the senior coffee taster tasting first followed successively by junior members.
Stool
Traditionally there is a short stool upon which the coffee taster sits with the spittoon between the tasters legs. The stool is intended to raise the taster to the correct level with respect to the spittoon and the coffee tasting table to facilitate tasting.
Cup
The cups used for coffee tasting are traditionally 8 oz. glass, such as a whiskey glass, so that the coffee taster can see the color of the brew, and inspect the foam on top of the cup and the sediments formed at the bottom of the cup.
Coffee sample trays
Traditionally coffee sample trays are set out on the coffee tasting table behind the cup being tasted. There will be a tray for the green coffee, a tray for the whole roasted coffee beans, and one for the fresh ground coffee; so that the coffee taster can inspect the color, and aroma of all three states that the coffee comes in. The coffee taster will run a finger through the coffee in the tray, then run their nose through the coffee in the tray.
Coffee tag
Each coffee sample tray will have a tag with the lot number, region, type of coffee bean and year grown listed on it, so that the taster can inspect the history of the coffee being tasted.
Hot water kettle and heating stand
Traditionally there is one or more large brass kettles in a heating stand nearby the coffee tasting table keeping water at the ideal temperature for coffee tasting, which is typically just below boiling temperature.
Roaster
Traditionally there is a gas fired batch roaster nearby the coffee tasting table for roasting small batches of coffee for tasting. Typically the coffee would be roasted and ground immediately prior to tasting.
Grinder
Traditionally there is a small coffee grinder nearby the coffee tasting table as part of the coffee tasting equipment for grinding the coffee just after roasting, and just prior to tasting.

== See also ==
- Degustation
- Sunalini Menon, Asia's first lady coffee cupper
