= Cricket-spitting =

Cricket-spitting is a sport wherein contestants place a dead cricket in their mouth, and then spit it as far as they can. The contestant who can spit the cricket the furthest is declared the winner.

Cricket-spitting was developed in 1996 by entomologist Tom Turpin at Purdue University in West Lafayette, Indiana, as a competition for their annual Bug Bowl event, which brings over 30,000 people per year to their campus for a series of insect-related events and competitions. Since its creation, other universities have begun their own competitions, such as Pennsylvania State University, who have hosted a 'spit-off' since 1998. A Scottish spin off of Cricket-Spitting is Wasp Waving, where contestants throw frozen wasps at a target while blind folded.

== World record ==
The Guinness World Record for cricket-spitting is 30 feet 1.5 inches (9.182 m) and is held by Dan Capps, from Madison, Wisconsin, and was set in June 1998 in front of a live television audience. Robert Tony Ferrell, from Hoopeston, Illinois, held the title/record in the 1997 Bug Bowl Games until upset by Dan Capps. Unofficial records of over 38 feet have been noted at competitions.

== Rules ==
Note: The ruleset is not fixed, and is subject to change or modification by organizations hosting their own competitions.

- The crickets are to be brown house crickets (Acheta domesticus), weighing between 45 and 55 milligrams.
- Crickets should be previously frozen, then thawed for the record attempt.
- Contestants must spit within 20 seconds of placing the cricket in their mouth.
- The distance will be measured from the center of the edge of the spitting circle, to where the cricket comes to rest, using a measuring tape.
- Contestants must not step outside of the red circle they stand in.
- The cricket must be fully intact, and held entirely in the mouth before the contestant may enter the spitting circle.
- The cricket must remain intact, and an official must check the spat cricket for six legs, four wings, and two antenna before the spit can be counted.

== See also ==
- Cockroach racing
