= Tea in France =

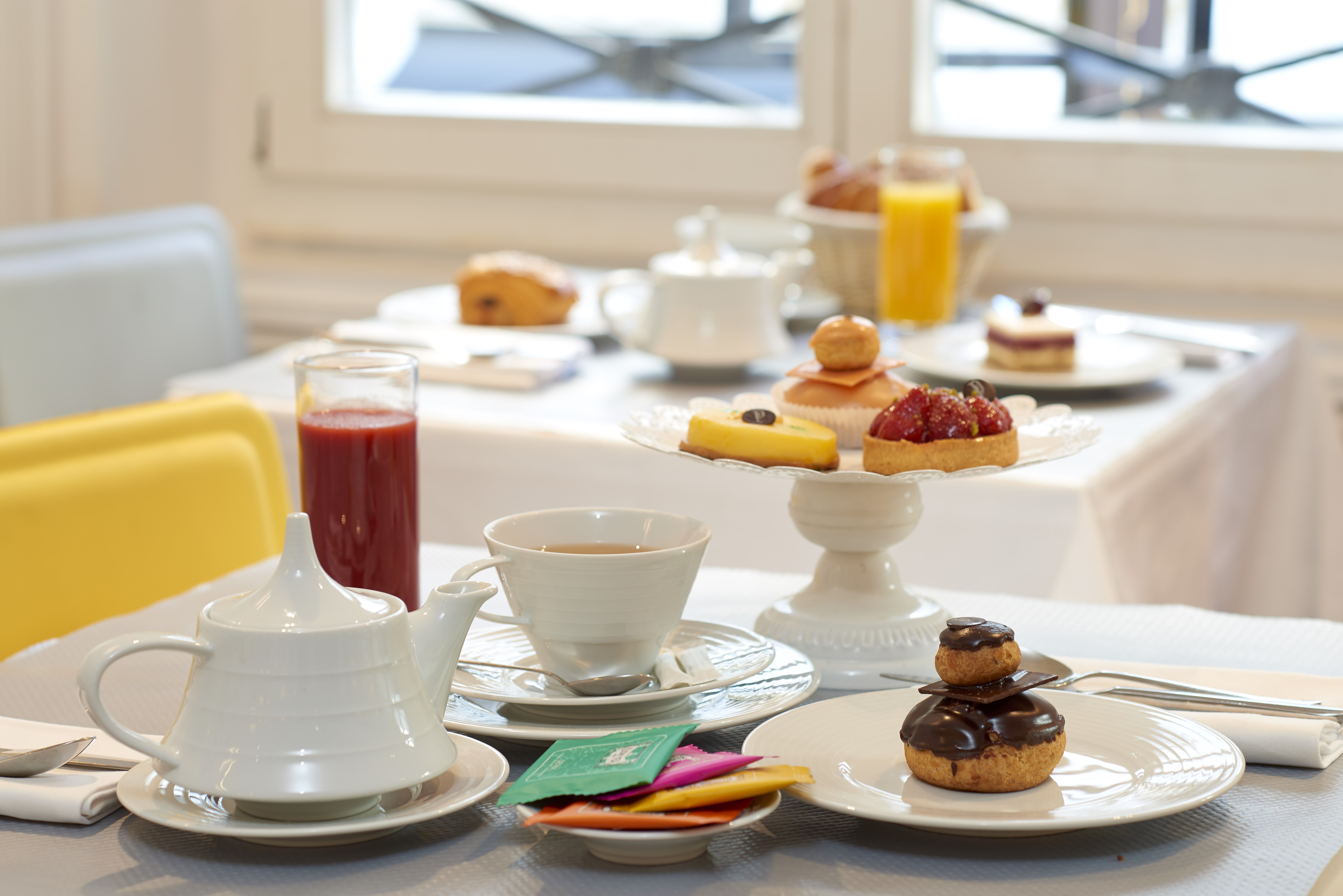
Gastronomic tea room, Paris.

The consumption of tea in France dates back to the seventeenth century, and has been growing slowly ever since. The market is highly fragmented, with upmarket tea brands building up an image of "French tea" that is easily exported.

Tea arrived in France during the reign of Louis XIII, at the same time as other luxury colonial products, chocolate, and coffee, and gained in popularity with the arrival of Jules Mazarin at court, who attributed medicinal virtues to tea. The price was high, however, and tea was reserved for the aristocracy, who were not content just to drink it: it was also used as a smoking plant, salad herb, or ointment ingredient. The use of milk in tea developed at the French court, as the hot liquid could damage porcelain cups. During the French Revolution, tea was seen as a luxury product and its consumption was discouraged. Under the Second Empire, Anglomania gave a new lease of life to tea consumption, and Empress Eugenie opened a private tea room inspired by the literary salons of the previous century. Other French tea rooms, open to the public, appeared at the same time, including Ladurée. Tea began to be consumed throughout France but was still reserved for the notables. In the 19th century, the working classes took up the habit of boiling water to protect themselves against cholera epidemics and became accustomed to tea competing with coffee. The end of the 19th century was marked by the Japanese movement and the fascination of Parisian cultural elites with the Far East, which gave tea a new lease of life. Black tea dominated French consumption until the 1970s before fragrant teas took over until the beginning of the 21st century, when the trend was to return to green tea, seen as natural and healthy.

Tea production in the 19th century was colonial, mainly in Indochina. An attempt at acclimatization in French Guiana was unsuccessful. Attempts were made to produce tea in France during the century, but specimens remained confined to botanical gardens. An attempt to produce tea on Reunion Island was abandoned in 1972 and not resumed until the beginning of the 21st century, while local experiments were organized in Brittany and Nantes. While French production remains anecdotal, French tea houses enjoy a good reputation. Several major brands, such as Kusmi Tea, Mariage Frères and Dammann Frères, process tea in France, before shipping it to Europe or Japan.

== History ==
=== Aristocratic period: from the 17th century to the French Revolution ===
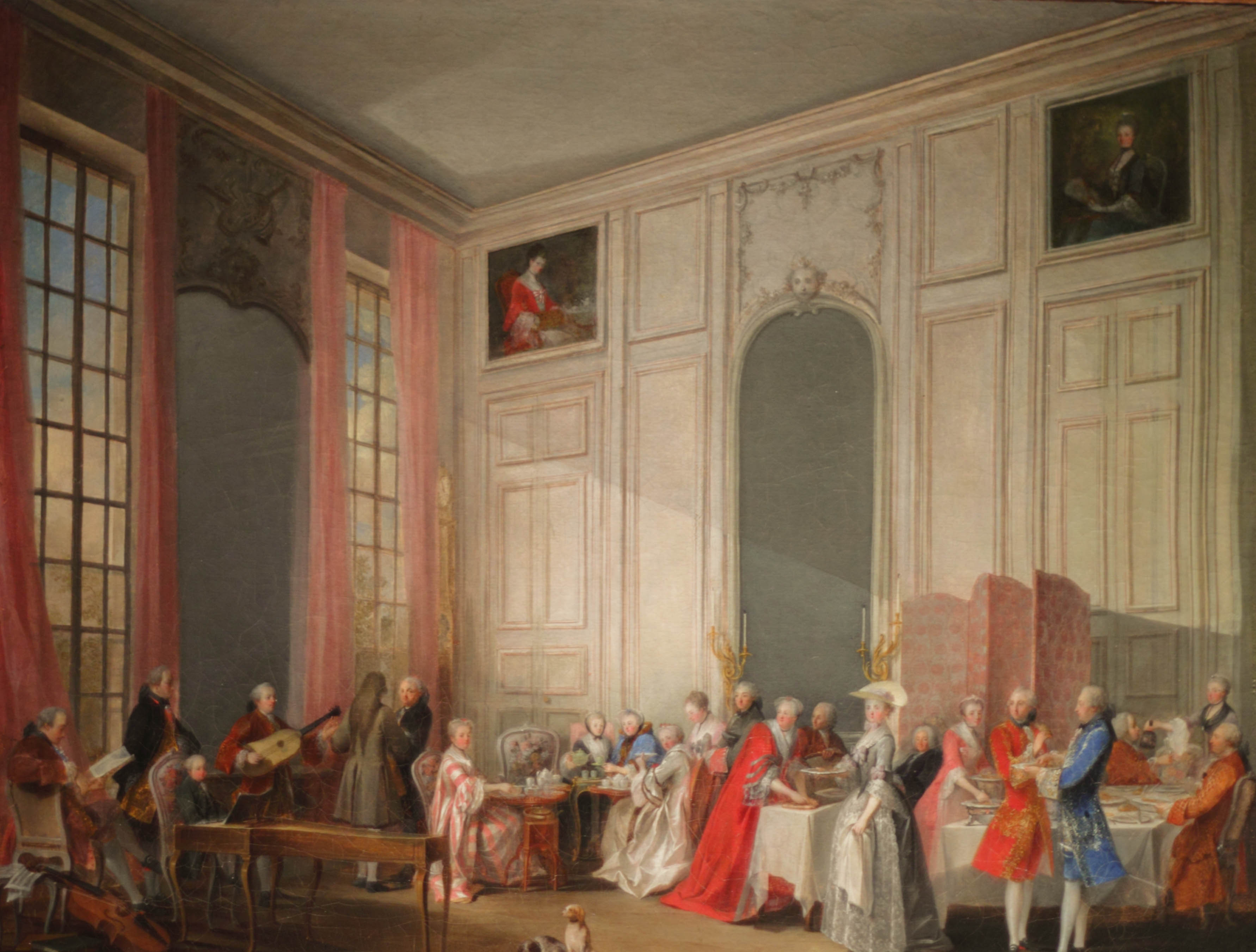
Thé à l'anglaise served in the salon des quatre-glaces at the Palais du Temple in Paris, Michel-Barthélemy Ollivier, 1766, Château de Versailles. Tea was initially consumed in France by the aristocracy.

Tea has been consumed in France since the reign of Louis XIII, on par with other colonial luxury products such as chocolate and coffee. Sources differ as to its precise introduction: either via the Dutch, who received their first shipment of tea in Amsterdam in 1610 and then redistributed it in Europe, or directly by the Jesuits, notably Alexandre de Rhodes, a missionary sent to China from 1618 to 1653. Jules Mazarin's arrival at court increased tea's popularity among the aristocracy: tea was thought to have cured his gout, and French medical treatises of the seventeenth century constantly extolled the merits of tea. However, due to its high price, doctors looked for alternatives among European plants, such as sage or veronica officinalis. In the 17th century, the use of tea in France was not limited to drinking. It was also consumed as a smoking plant, salad herb, or used in onguent.

It was at the French court that the custom of adding milk to tea was first established: pouring a few cold drops into the porcelain cup beforehand protects the object from the thermal shock of pouring hot tea.

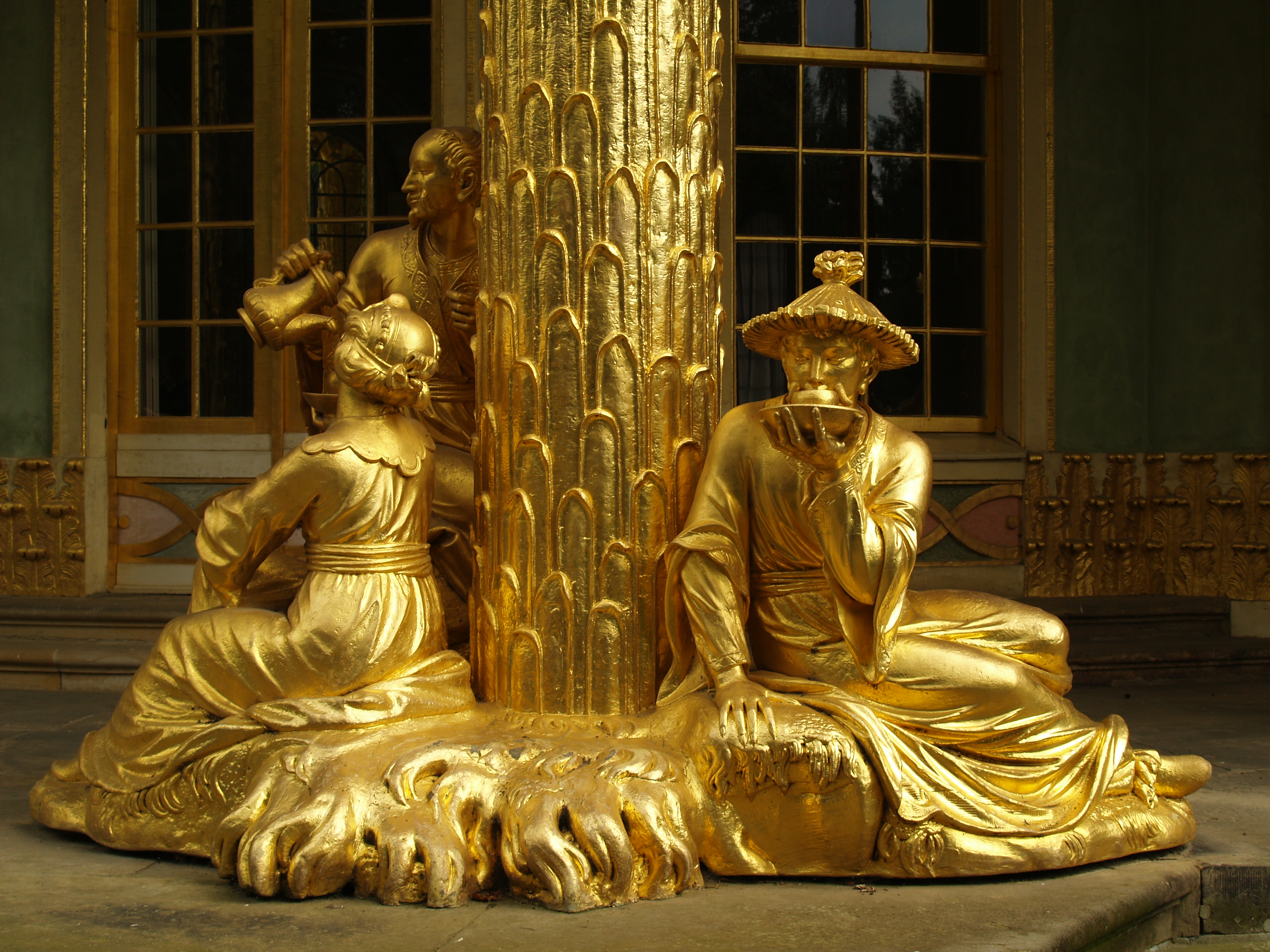
Sculpture in the Chinese House in Potsdam, a copy of the House of the Trefoil as it existed in 1738 at the Château de Lunéville, at the court of Stanislas Leszczynski, typical of the orientalism of the period.

Tea was imported from China via Holland until 1700, which marked the return of the ship L'Amphitrite from China and the start of direct imports. In Lettres édifiantes et curieuses, the Jesuits report that they sought to directly develop the tea trade between China and France, notably through the establishment of trading posts in Canton, but that this operation collapsed in the 18th century due to the hostility of the Chinese towards them. Meanwhile, French imports of Chinese tea, via the port of Lorient, reached 1,000 tons in 1766 and increased 400-fold between 1693 and 1785. During the Regency and the reign of Louis XV, the consumption of chocolate (claimed to be an aphrodisiac) and coffee (due to the literary cafés) increased in France more than that of tea. Queen Marie Leszczynska received a Japanese porcelain and French gold set containing tea, chocolate and coffee for the birth of the Dauphin, now kept in the Louvre. Tea was more popular at the court of the Duchy of Lorraine, where Stanislas Leszczynski's physician recommended tea to him and where Turkish and Chinese exoticism was in fashion. Stanislas's confectioner, Joseph Gilliers, recommended choosing leaves that had "a violet taste and smell", boiling them for 15 minutes in water, possibly enriched with two slices of lemon, and drinking the mixture with a sugar loaf.

During the French Revolution, tea, synonymous with luxury and the gulf separating the upper classes from the rest of society, was decried and its consumption discouraged.

=== Rediscovery: Anglomania, Japonism, colonial and popular consumption ===
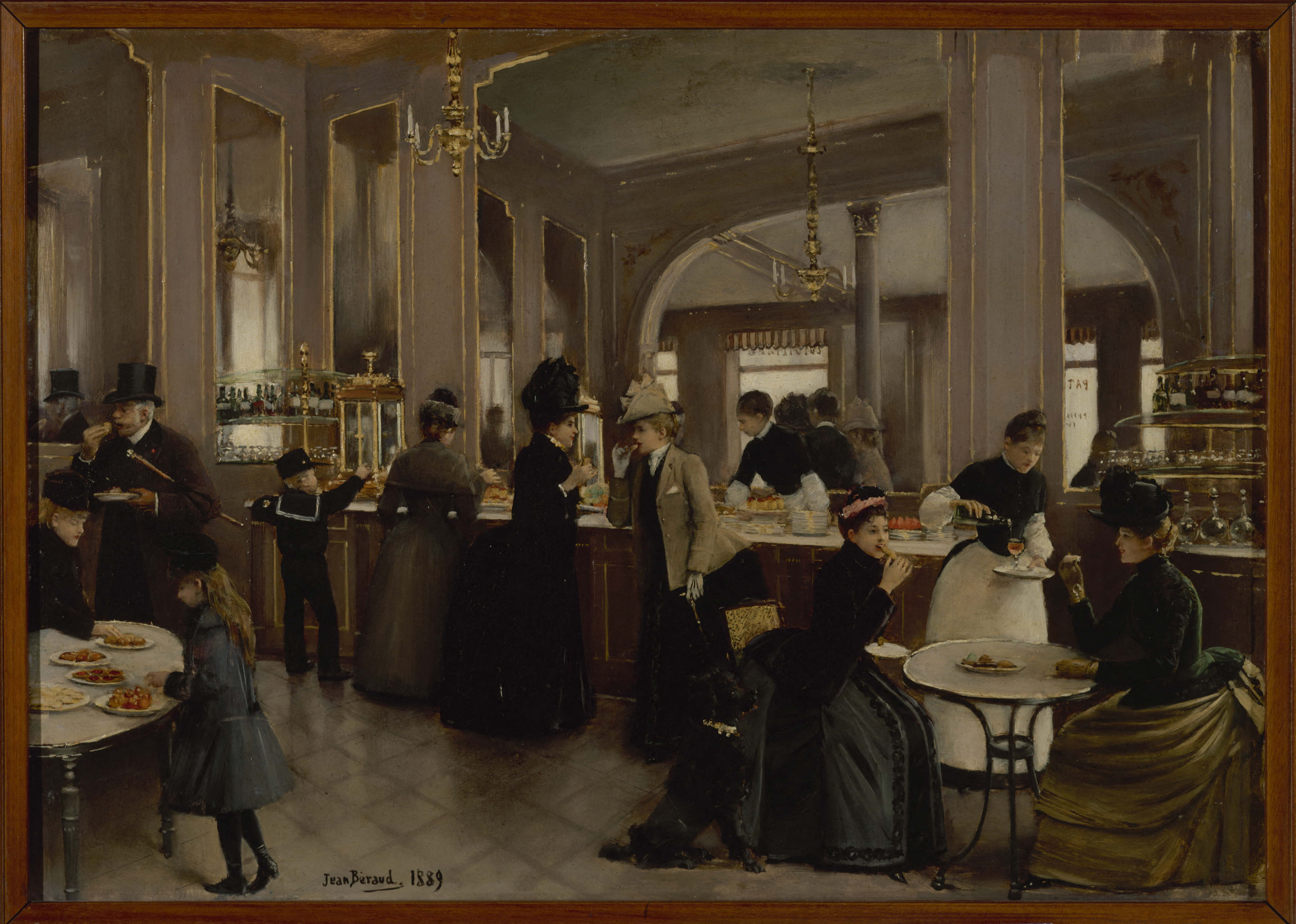
La Pâtisserie Gloppe aux Champs-Élysées, Jean Béraud, 1889, Musée Carnavalet. The tea room is a French invention from the 17th century.

In the 19th century, and more particularly during the Second Empire, Anglomania gave a new lease of life to the consumption of Tea. The Empress Eugénie de Montijo's private tea room provided an opportunity to bring together the intellectuals of the day (Gustave Flaubert, Alexandre Dumas, Théophile Gautier, Auguste Delacroix, Gustave Doré, Louis Pasteur... ), in the manner of the literary salons of the previous century; it thus served to anchor a filiation between the Second Empire and the French monarchy, this filiation being reaffirmed in the revival of the aesthetic of Marie-Antoinette of Austria and enriched by an assumed celebration of colonial riches.

Other French-style tearooms, open to the public, appeared in Paris. These included Ladurée, where tea, other non-alcoholic beverages, and pastries were served to a predominantly female clientele. These tea rooms enabled well-to-do women to get out of the house without having to frequent the socially disreputable cafés and bistros of the time. This service was later extended to the grand palaces of Paris but remained confined to provincial notables and the capital's bourgeois arrondissements: 7th, 8th, and 16th. Tea was also consumed by the wealthy in Biarritz and on the Mediterranean Riviera, and was reserved for medical use in other social classes. The spread of tea to the less affluent classes was very slow, driven in part by the need to boil water before consumption to protect against the cholera epidemic that raged throughout the 19th century but slowed by competition from coffee, which was abundantly produced in the French colonies.

France wanted to develop tea production in its colonies, particularly in Indochina, to meet the needs of three categories of consumers: those in Indochina, who imported their tea from China; those in North Africa, who imported English green tea; and finally, those in mainland France, who imported British black tea. For the French, local production was of very poor quality, and it seemed necessary to establish new plantations run by colonists.

An attempt to grow tea in French Guiana, an underdeveloped colony where colonists saw their enrichment diminish with the banning of the slave trade in 1815, failed miserably: around 30 Chinese and Malays, drawn from the Manila community, were hired and settled in 1820 in a dwelling on the Kaw marshes. However, the project had not been properly planned, as the question of whether the site was suitable for growing tea had not been asked, while the workers were installed in poor conditions and subjected to ill treatment. The majority died of disease in this unhealthy environment, with four survivors being brought back to Asia in 1835.

In the 19th century, tea imports to France fluctuated sharply: 150 tons in 1829, 46 tons in 1830, 87 tons in 1831, and 231 tons in 1842. The method of preparing tea evolved: first, the crockery, teapot, and cup were heated with boiling water, then 4 grams of tea per guest were poured into the teapot, which was covered entirely with boiling water and left to infuse for 6 to 8 minutes; water was then added to make enough for all guests, and sugar, tea and two spoonfuls of cream were poured into each cup. Metal teapots, especially silver ones, were considered better than porcelain ones due to their thermal conductivity, and it was recommended to store tea in tin or lead tins. Attempts were made to produce tea in France during the 19th century, but specimens remained confined to botanical gardens, in part those of the Muséum National d'Histoire Naturelle and the Orangerie du Luxembourg.m 5.

The end of the 19th century was marked by the Japanese movement and the fascination of Parisian cultural elites with the Far East, as exemplified by their frequentation of the Porte chinoise, a tea and furniture store frequented by Zola, Baudelaire, Champfleury, Cernushi, Manet, Degas, Monet and Fantin-Latour.

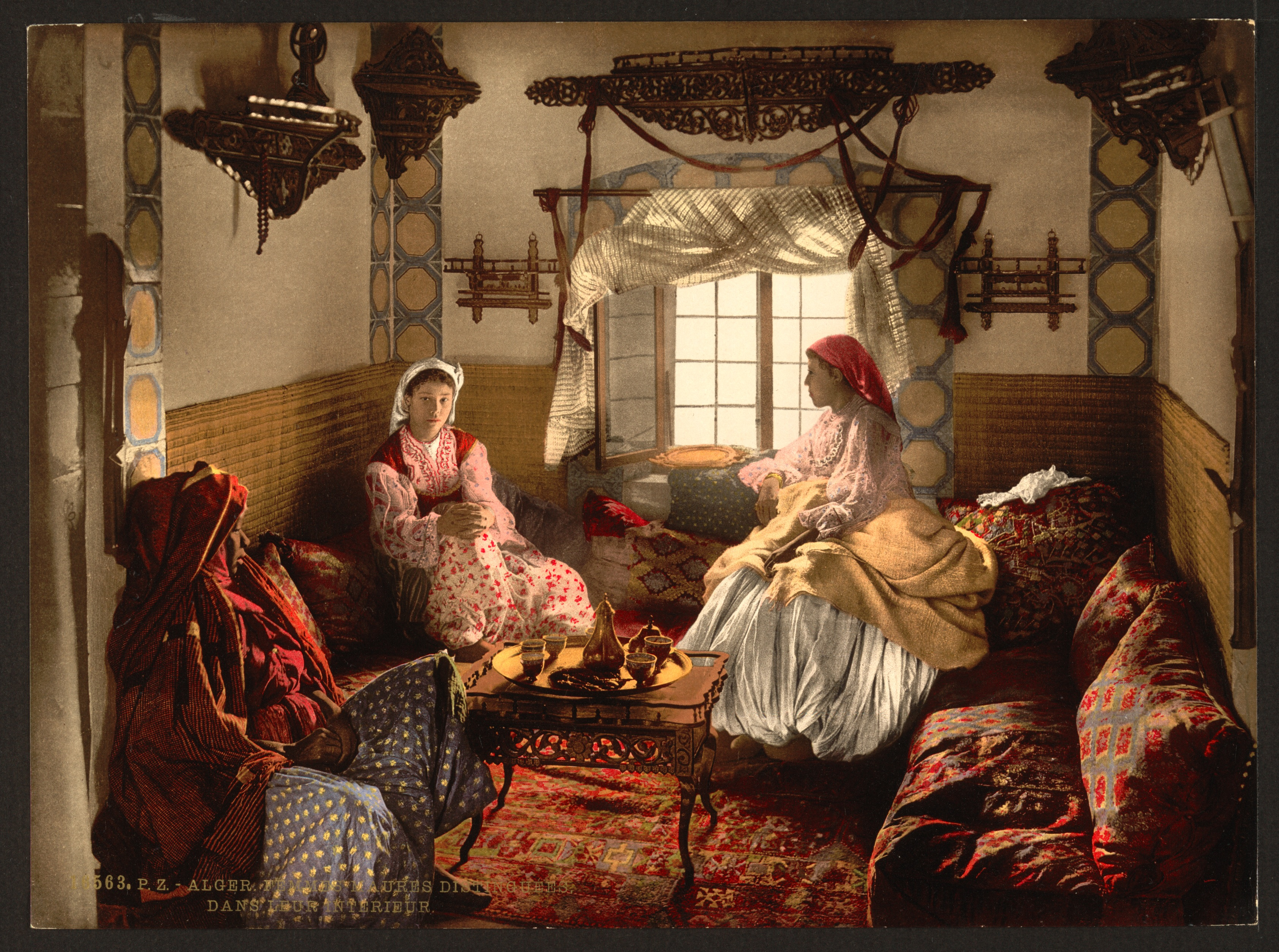
Algéroises distinguées dans leur intérieur, engraving from 1899, Library of Congress.

The 1900 Universal Exhibition was an opportunity for France to discover Ceylon tea, which took on an image of exoticism and quality. At the beginning of the 20th century, tea was above all a pretext for social and social gatherings, and tea-dancing parties became increasingly popular.

In 1925, four-fifths of tea consumption in the French colonial empire was in North Africa, in the form of green tea; these 5,000 tonnes came mainly from imports, with French Indochina producing barely 500 tonnes of tea. At the end of the 1930s, numbers were relatively similar, with Indochina producing around 550 tonnes, France 1,350 tonnes, Tunisia 2,093 tonnes and Algeria 1,569 tonnes. Tea not produced in Indochina was imported from China and India. Consumption changed little until the mid-1950s (1,614 tons in France, 2,482 in Tunisia), except in Algeria, where it more than doubled to 3,846 tons in 1956.

When France was occupied by Germany during the Second World War, the population was hit by numerous shortages, particularly of tea. The Vichy regime claimed that these shortages were due to the blockade, but the fact that metropolitan agricultural products, such as pigs, were also in short supply led the French population to believe that it was the German occupiers who were appropriating resources. The tea shortage eases with the Churchill-Weygand agreements, under which it is decided that England will resupply North Africa with tea. An attempt to produce tea on Reunion Island was abandoned in 1972, only to be resumed at the beginning of the 21st century.

=== Third wind: "French tea", gastronomic approach, diversification ===
Black tea dominated French consumption until the 1970s, then flavored teas became the most popular until the beginning of the 21st century when the trend was to return to green tea, seen as natural and healthy.

The 1980s marked a turning point for French tea, with Mariage Frères implementing a marketing strategy based on the image of French luxury, and the founding of Palais des thés, a company more focused on travel and cultural discovery. These initiatives were reinforced by a major investment in advertising by the major tea brands in the 1990s.

Tea consumption rose sharply at the turn of the 21st century, doubling from 1995 to 2005 and tripling from 1995 to 2015. Consumption is shifting more and more towards the major tea houses, as opposed to private labels, which are growing by 10% a year and remain in the majority. This growth is accompanied by a democratization of tea-shop attendance.

== Consumption ==
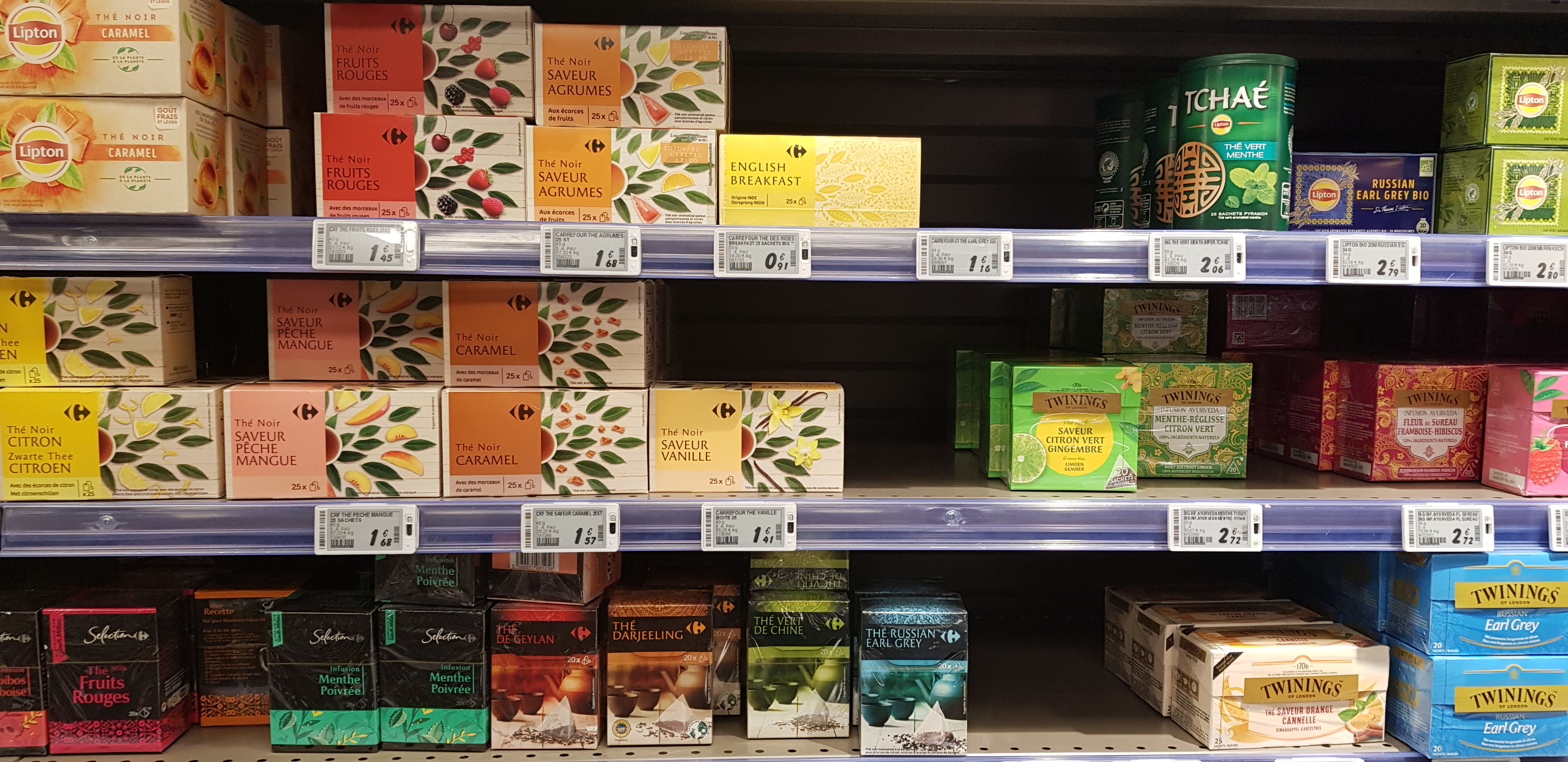
Part of the tea section of a Carrefour hypermarket in Paris, 2019.

In 2022, average tea consumption in France was 250g per person per year, compared with three kilos in Turkey, Ireland or United Kingdom. In 2015, France ranked 30th in the world in terms of consumption, with an average of 230 grams per person per year. In 2005, the market was worth 500 million euros with a wealthy clientele willing to pay more for a quality product. Compared with other European countries, such as Germany, the market's weakness can be explained by the fact that, in 2005, barely two out of three French people consumed tea (compared with one out of two at the end of the 1990s). The market, though highly fragmented, is strongly dominated by brands sold in supermarkets: Lipton accounts for half of sales by volume, followed by Twinings. Tea houses, taken together, account for just 20% of the market. Organic tea is on the rise, accounting for 7% of green tea sales in 2017.

Despite the country's general interest in fair trade, there is little evidence of this in the tea market. When Unilever wanted to communicate the Rainforest Alliance certification of its tea, it realized that tea tins bearing this visible certification sold less than conventional tins. However, in the iced tea market, the May Tea brand has chosen to emphasize this certification. François-Xavier Delmas, founder of Palais des thés, confirms this lack of interest by not selling fair trade certified tea, and is also critical, explaining that certification can be a way for tea producers to increase their prices without the taste quality of their products following suit.

=== Modes of consumption ===
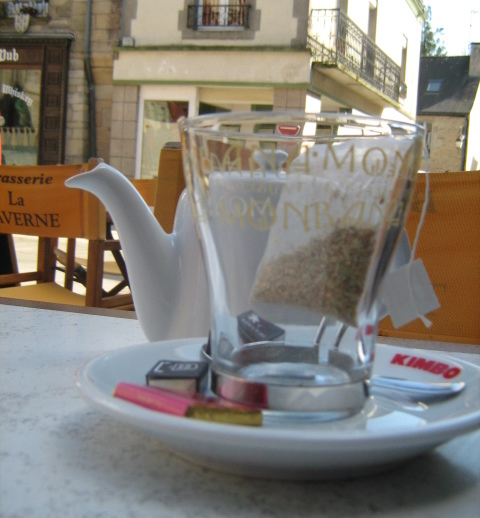
Tea served on the terrace, Brittany.

The French generally drink hot tea at breakfast or in the afternoon. During the Restoration period, upper-class Frenchmen had lunch around 11 a.m. and dinner at 6 p.m., and tea was then taken around 11 p.m. with light pastries, usually after the theater. With the shift of dinner later in the evening, tea was consumed around 5 p.m., in the English fashion, with more substantial snacks.

Most people add sugar to their tea (65%), lemon (30%), milk (25%), or nothing (32%). Half the tea consumed in France in 2011 was black tea. A classic evolutionary profile for French tea consumers is to start with flavored teas and then move on to plain teas.

In French gastronomy, tea is increasingly a means of offering a refined, alcohol-free alternative to wine at lunchtime. In bars and restaurants, Lipton is the brand almost systematically served, due to its very affordable price and low customer demand; only bars and cafés specifically seeking to serve good tea offer alternatives: Palais des thés, Kusmi Tea or Mariage Frères. p 7. In addition to the price and quality of the tea, restaurateurs prefer suppliers who offer teas in bags, to avoid theft of infusers, and those who can provide crockery, such as teapots.

Unlike Russian or Chinese consumers, French consumers generally don't infuse the same tea leaf several times, no doubt because of a cultural attachment to constant taste, and also so that the harmony with foodstuffs doesn't change.

Since the 1980s, the French have consumed Christmas tea, which is generally flavored with spices, dried fruit, and candied fruit, and available in many variations depending on the brand. These teas are notably sold hot and prepared at Christmas markets, as an alternative to mulled wine. Consumption of iced tea rose sharply in France in the late 2010s, as customers turned away from soft drinks, which were perceived as too sweet. These iced teas are either prepared from loose tea and designed to be drunk hot, or from loose blends designed specifically to be drunk iced, or bought ready-made in bottles; the latter generally have low sugar content to escape the tax on sugary drinks. For ready-to-drink beverages, Lipton largely dominated the market in 2019, with nearly half of sales for ice tea, followed by private labels (23%), May Tea (Suntory group, 12%) and Fuze Tea (Coca-Cola group, 7%). In 2016, the market penetration rate for iced tea bottles reached 42% in France, up 4.6 points on the previous year. Since the late 2010s, more recently than other Western (1990-2000s) and Asian (1970-1980s) countries, France has consumed bubble tea. This late arrival stems from the fact that bubble tea is commonly sold as a street food, to be consumed quickly while walking, while French consumers remain on average more attached to long, sit-down meals than the rest of the Western world.

=== Tea and cooking ===
The first documented use of tea in cooking is a recipe for tea cream by La Chapelle, published in Le Cuisinier moderne in 1742; this recipe remained the only use of tea in French cuisine until the 19th century, before the development, as in other countries, of sweet recipes based on tea: financier, cakes, crème brûlée or madeleines. In France, savory haute cuisine incorporating tea was also developing, as was a whole culture of the best pairings between tea and food, particularly tea and cheese. Mariage Frères offers a wide range of tea-based dishes in its salons, both savory and sweet: marinades, vinaigrettes and sauces accompany fish and meat dishes.

== Commerce ==
=== Brands ===
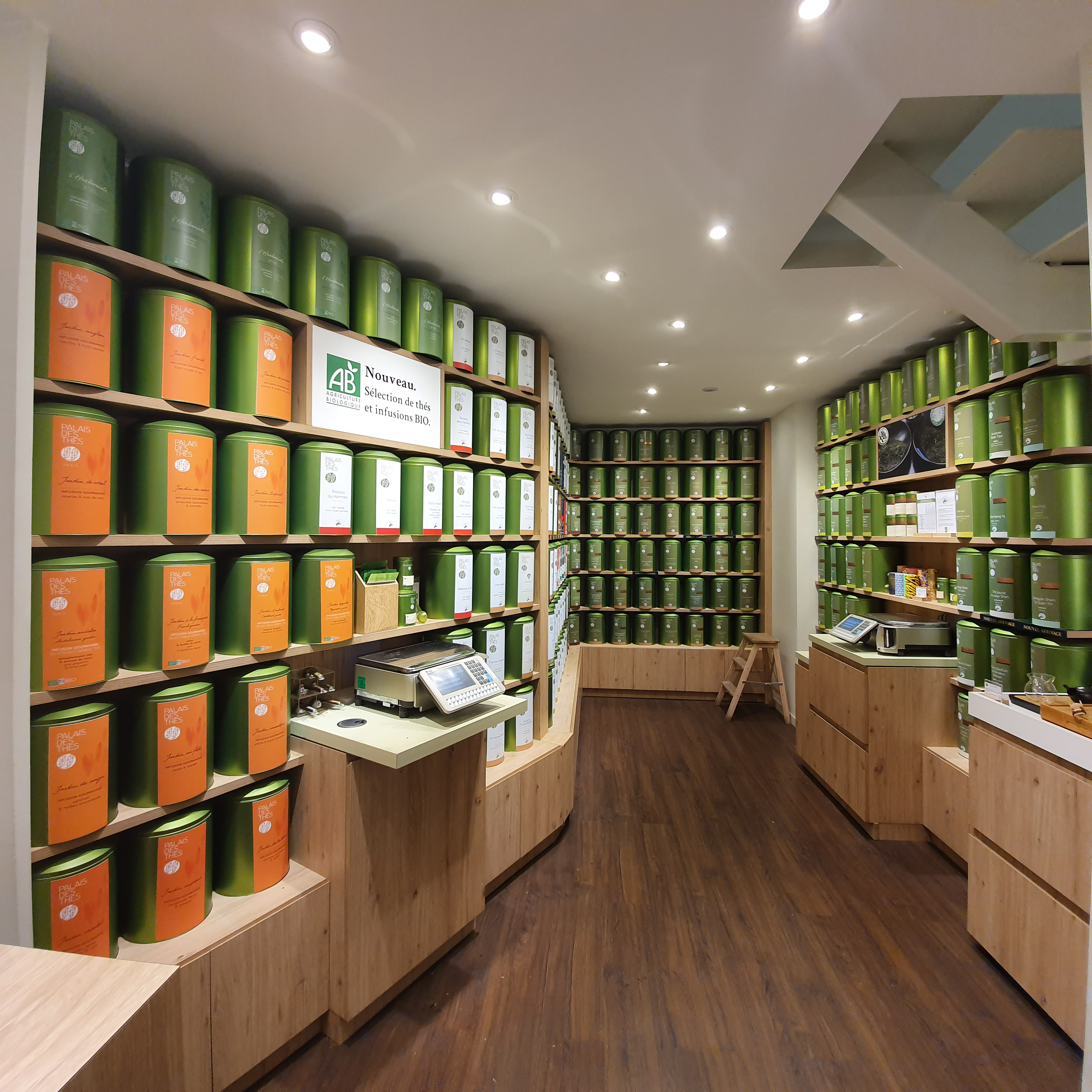
Palais des thés store.

The main French tea brands fall into three categories. Historically French importers of colonial products, founded in the 19th century and generally importing products other than tea, such as Compagnie Coloniale, Mariage Frères, Olivier-Langlois, and Thé Éléphant. The importers were founded by foreigners (British with George Cannon, Dutch-British with Betjeman & Barton, Dutch with Dammann Frères, Russian with Kusmi Tea) then set up in France, and dating from the same period. Last but not least, there are the new players who appeared at the end of the 20th century, bringing their vision to the table, such as Palais des thés, with its "globe-trotting approach", the SCOP-TI cooperative created from the takeover of the Elephant tea factory, or Les Jardins de Gaïa, specializing in bio tea. Many other companies exist, but most are mainly available in Paris.

=== Imports ===
While several tea houses, such as Palais des thés and Jardins de Gaïa, import tea directly from producing countries, the majority of tea imported into France comes from Germany, with the leaves transiting via Hamburg, where companies flavor them for resale. In 2010, France imported over 19,000 tonnes of tea. These imports are facilitated by European Union trade rules, which impose no customs duties on tea. In 2016, France was the world's 10th largest importer of tea, accounting for 2.6% of tonnages traded, worth US$161 million.

=== Export ===
Several major brands, such as Kusmi Tea, Mariage Frères, or Dammann Frères, process tea in France, before shipping it to Europe or Japan; these exports account for between 30% and 40% of their sales.

== Production ==
=== Plantations ===
In the seventeenth century, Jesuit Jean-Baptiste Labat tried to introduce tea to Martinique using seeds from China; when the trees grew, he realized that they were in fact Camellia sasanqua, not Camellia sinensis.

Several other attempts to produce tea took place on Reunion Island, more precisely at Grand Coude, on a volcanic plateau at an altitude of 1,100 m; production covered almost 350 hectares in the 1960s, only to be abandoned in 1972. The plantation was revived at the beginning of the 21st century: the old tea bushes, now several meters high and therefore unsuitable for picking, were transformed into a tourist attraction. Other gardens were opened in mixed plantations, with tobacco to protect the tea bushes from sunlight and insects, and pumpkins to cover the soil. Their production, of green tea, white tea, flavored tea (cinnamon, lemongrass, and home-grown geranium), and tea-derived products, reached 53 tons for 587 hectares cultivated in 2017.

In Nantes, a small-scale tea production has existed since 2002, with a club of amateurs cultivating around a hundred tea bushes received as a gift from Suncheon, a city twinned with Nantes. It produced 900g of fresh leaves in 2011, which were then converted into 300g of green tea. The tea harvest is the occasion for a festival open to the public. Several attempts at tea production are also taking place in Brittany, a region that is sufficiently humid, sunny, and protected from frost to consider growing tea plants. First sales are scheduled for 2020. In Alès, Gard, the Parc Floral de la Prairie produced 2,000 tea bushes in 2006. Other gardens also exist in the Pyrenees.

=== Tea transformation ===
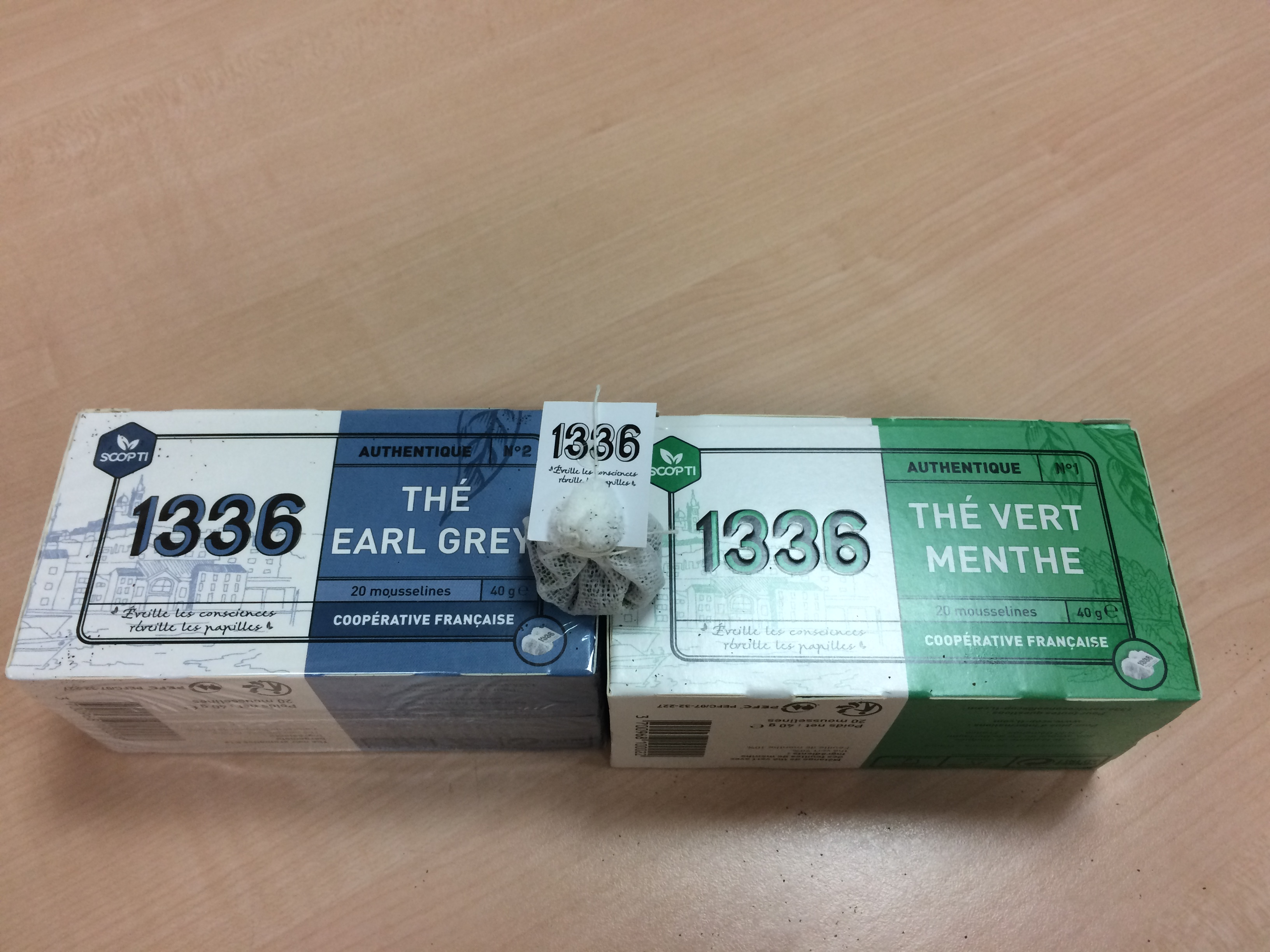
Tea boxes 1336.

The operations carried out in France include the manufacture of loose tea packaging (metal tins or bags), the blending of teas from different origins, and the flavoring of the leaves. While the latter is generally done by spraying with essential oil, Compagnie Coloniale's flavoring is done by steam. French tea houses were particularly inventive when it came to flavors and fragrances, and their creations were often subsequently adopted by British brands.

In 2010, Unilever decided to relocate its Éléphant brand tea bag factory from Gémenos to Poland. Production was indeed transferred, but the emblematic social conflict dragged on, and the employees succeeded in taking over the factory, founding the cooperative Scop-TI and the brand 1336, named after the 1,336 days of social conflict, as a means of distributing their production. All in all, tea employs few people in France: Pagès, the leading private-label tea brand, employs around 100 people, while Kusmi Tea employs around 500, divided between boutiques and the production plant in Le Havre. Unlike Unilever, Kusmi Tea has chosen to relocate its production (tea and tins) to France, after having previously done so in Morocco: the chairman explains this change of heart by the rising cost of labor worldwide, which is catching up with that of France, the rising cost of oil, greater logistical flexibility induced by the presence of production plants directly in the sales territory, and lastly investments in automation made possible by the CICE.

=== Utensils ===
In the 18th century, the growing consumption of tea by the aristocracy led the Vincennes and then Sèvres porcelain factories to produce high-quality porcelain for this purpose, after an initial period during which Chinese products were used. This tableware was not specific to tea, as it was also used for the other exotic beverages gaining in popularity during this period, coffee and chocolate, including teapots that could be used to prepare and serve coffee. This production continued into the 18th and 20th centuries. However, the invention of fine earthenware in England in the mid-seventeenth century and Anglomania meant that the French market was dominated by British imports. In the 19th century, the continental blockade and technological innovations making it possible to produce rococo-style earthenware from Terre de Lorraine boosted French production, leading to the establishment of new factories in Apt, Bordeaux, Calais, Chantilly, Choisy-le-Roi, Creil, Douai, Forges-les-Eaux, Gien, Le Havre, Longwy, Orléans, Sarreguemines and Val-sous-Meudon.

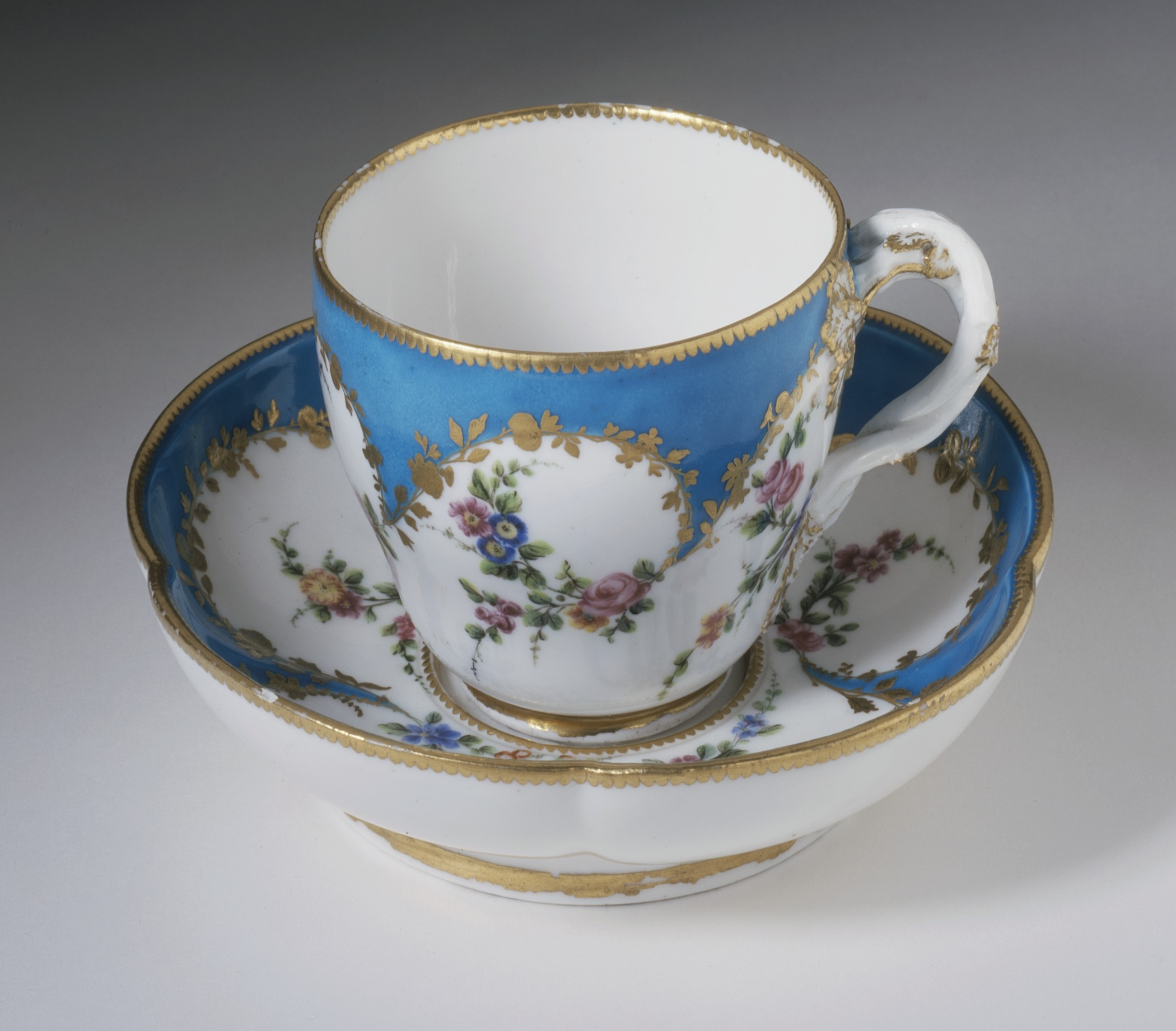
Cup and saucer in soft porcelain. With the mark of François Binet, painter of flowers, Manufacture de Vincennes, circa 1753.

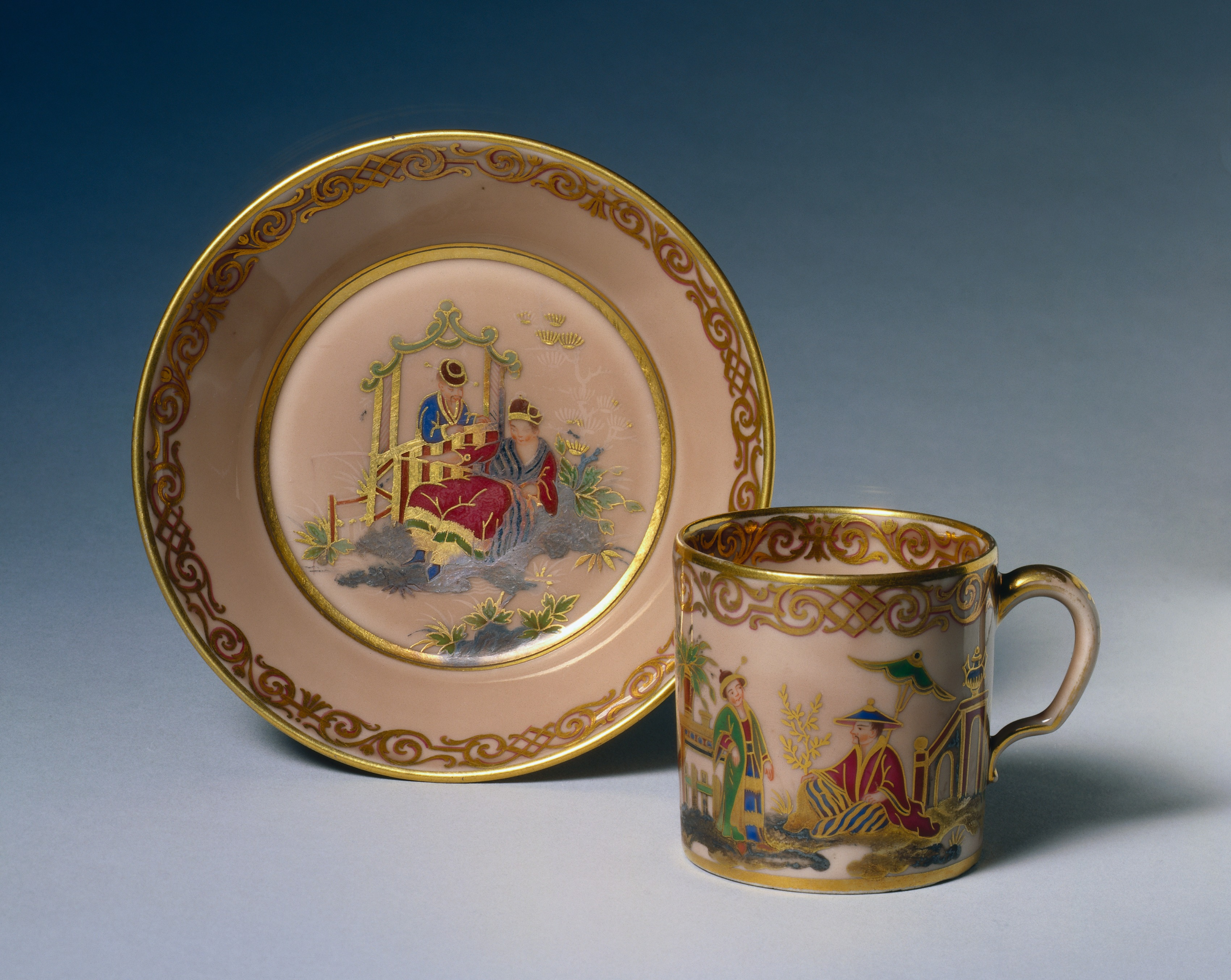
Hard porcelain litron goblet and saucer, Japanese decoration, Manufacture de Sèvres, 1778.

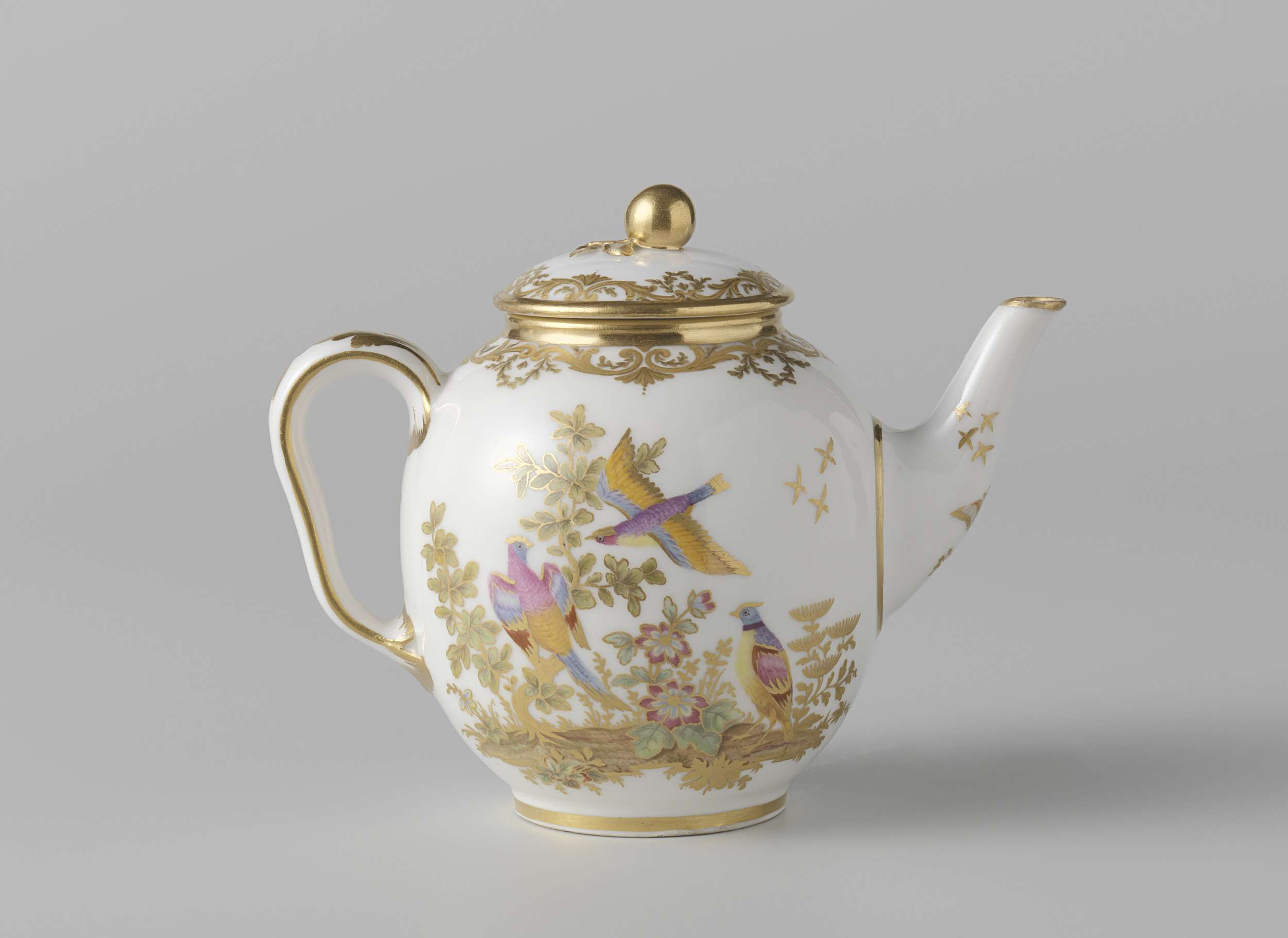
Teapot, painted and gilded by Jean-Armand Fallot and Henri Marin Prévost l'aîné, Manufacture de Sèvres, 1779.

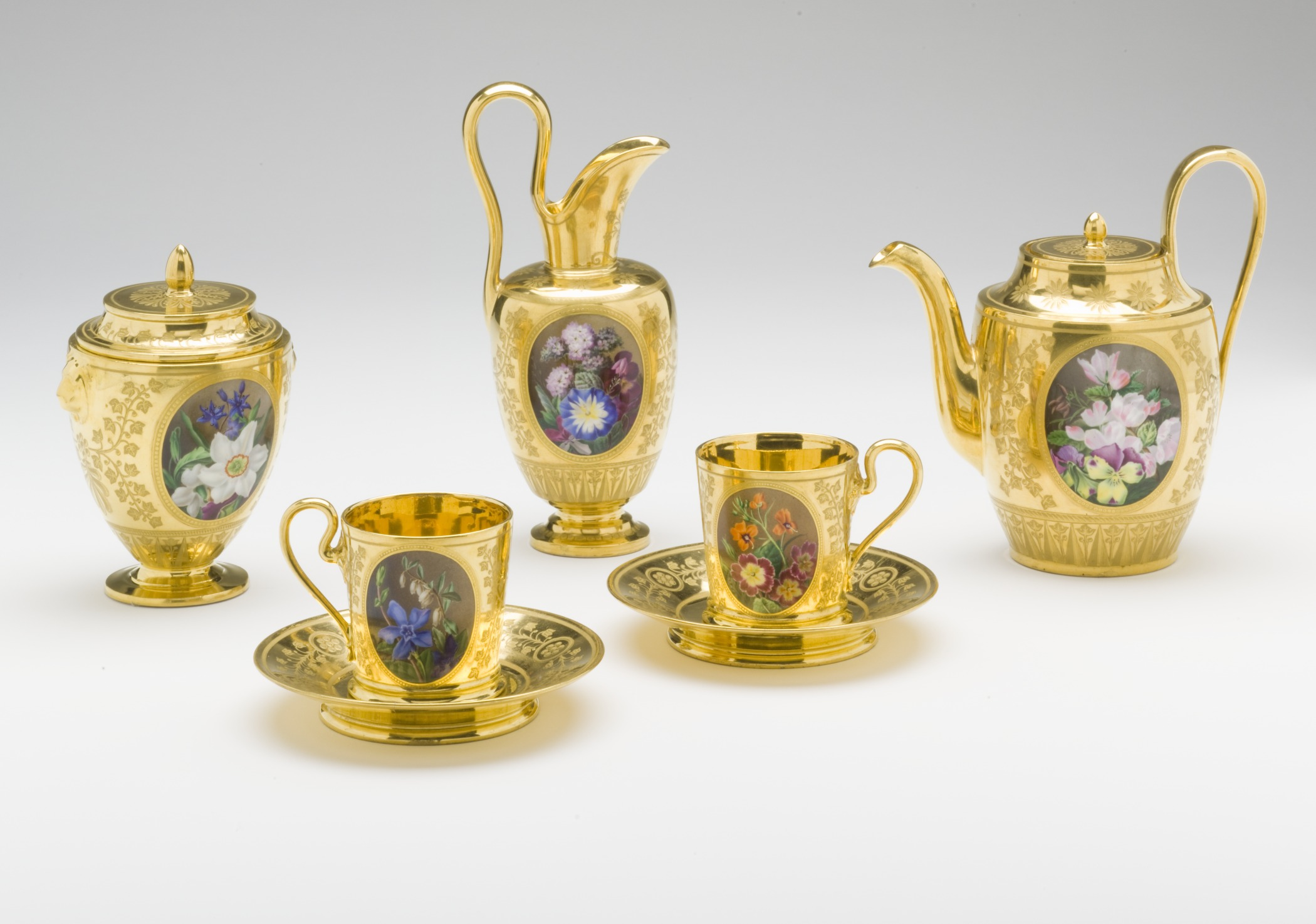
Tea service, decorated by Georgius J. Van Os, Sèvres, 1812.

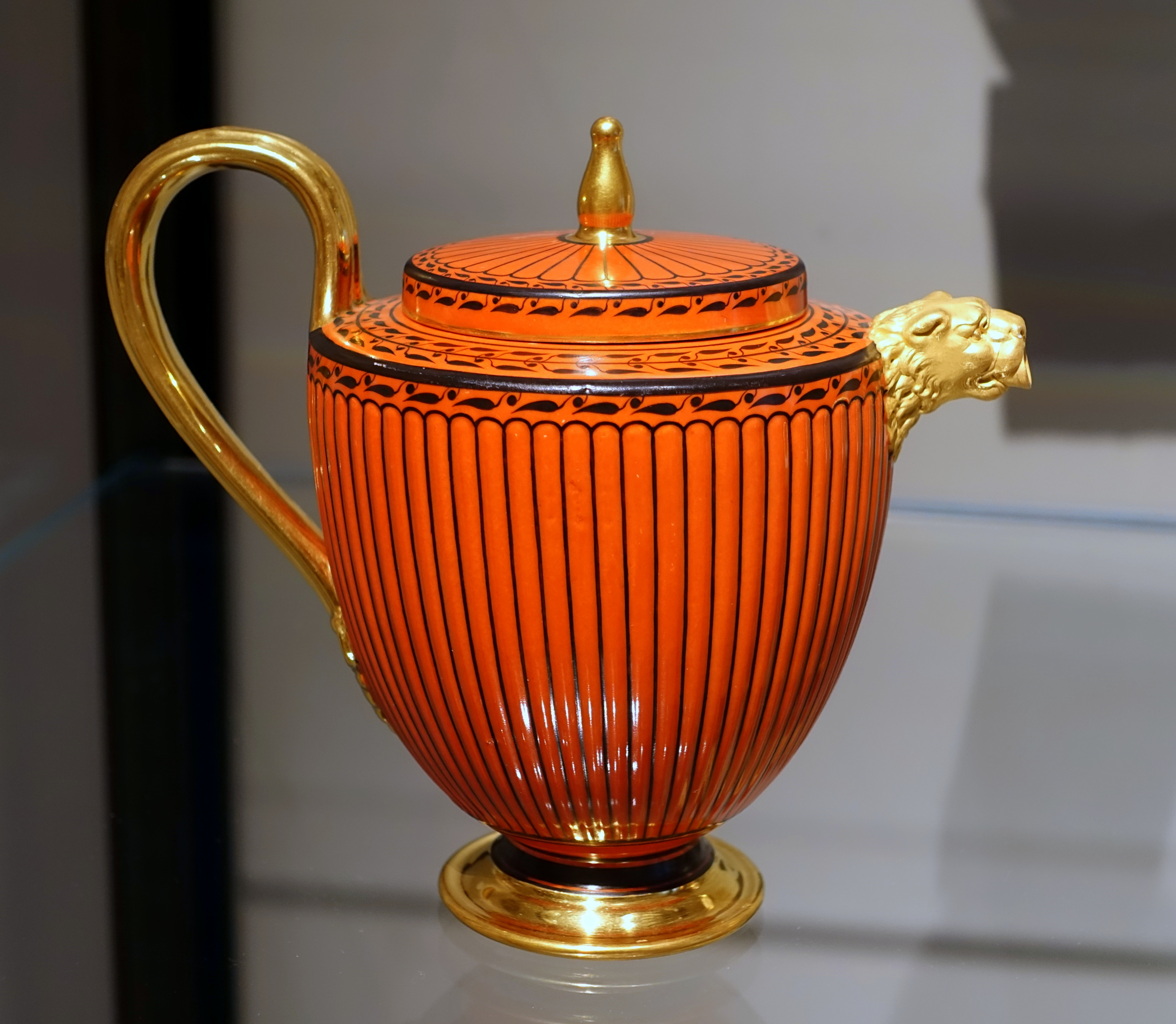
Covered gadrooned teapot with lion's head spout, Empire style, Sèvres, 1817.

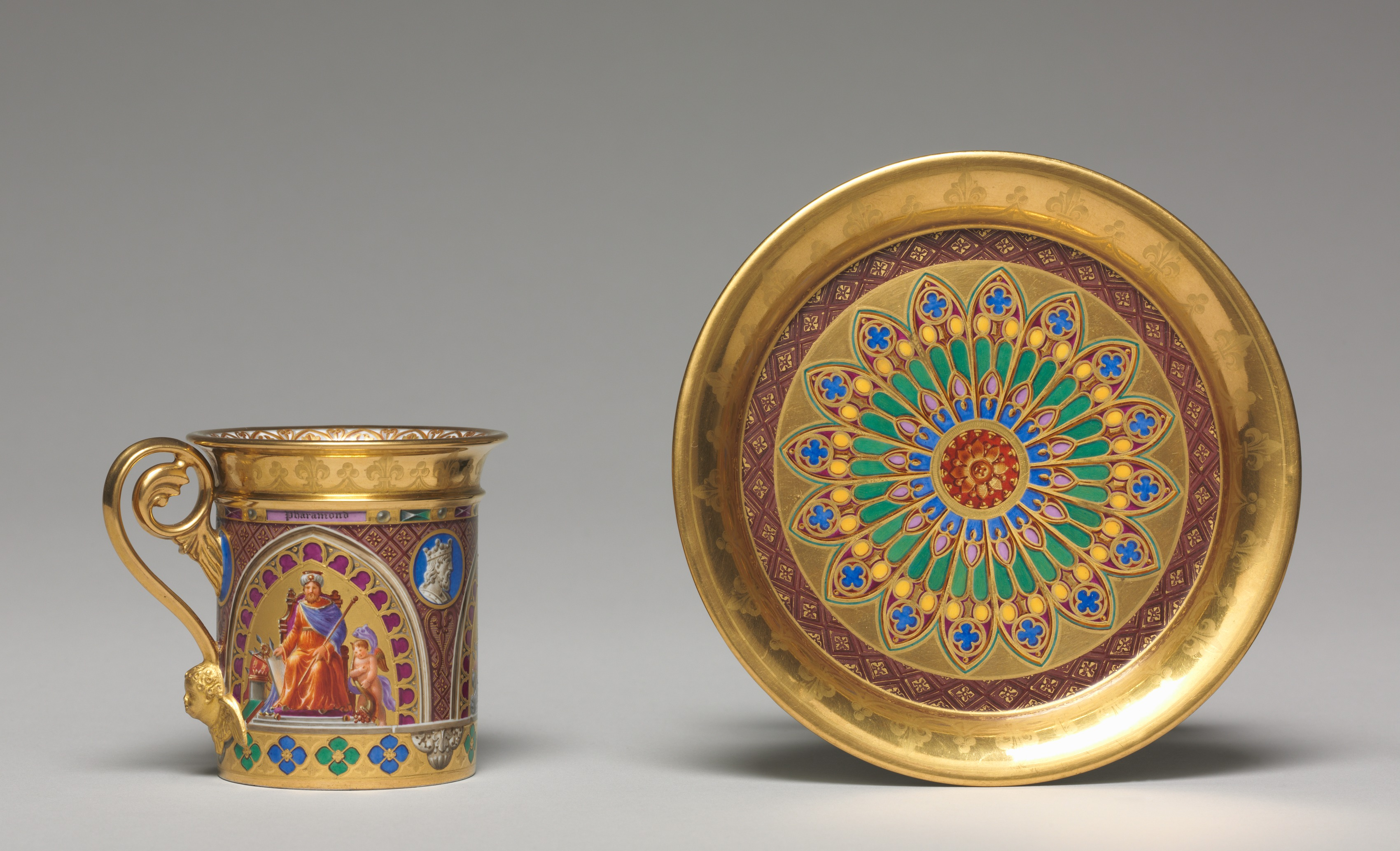
Goblet and saucer, decorated with French kings and gilding, Sèvres, 1827.

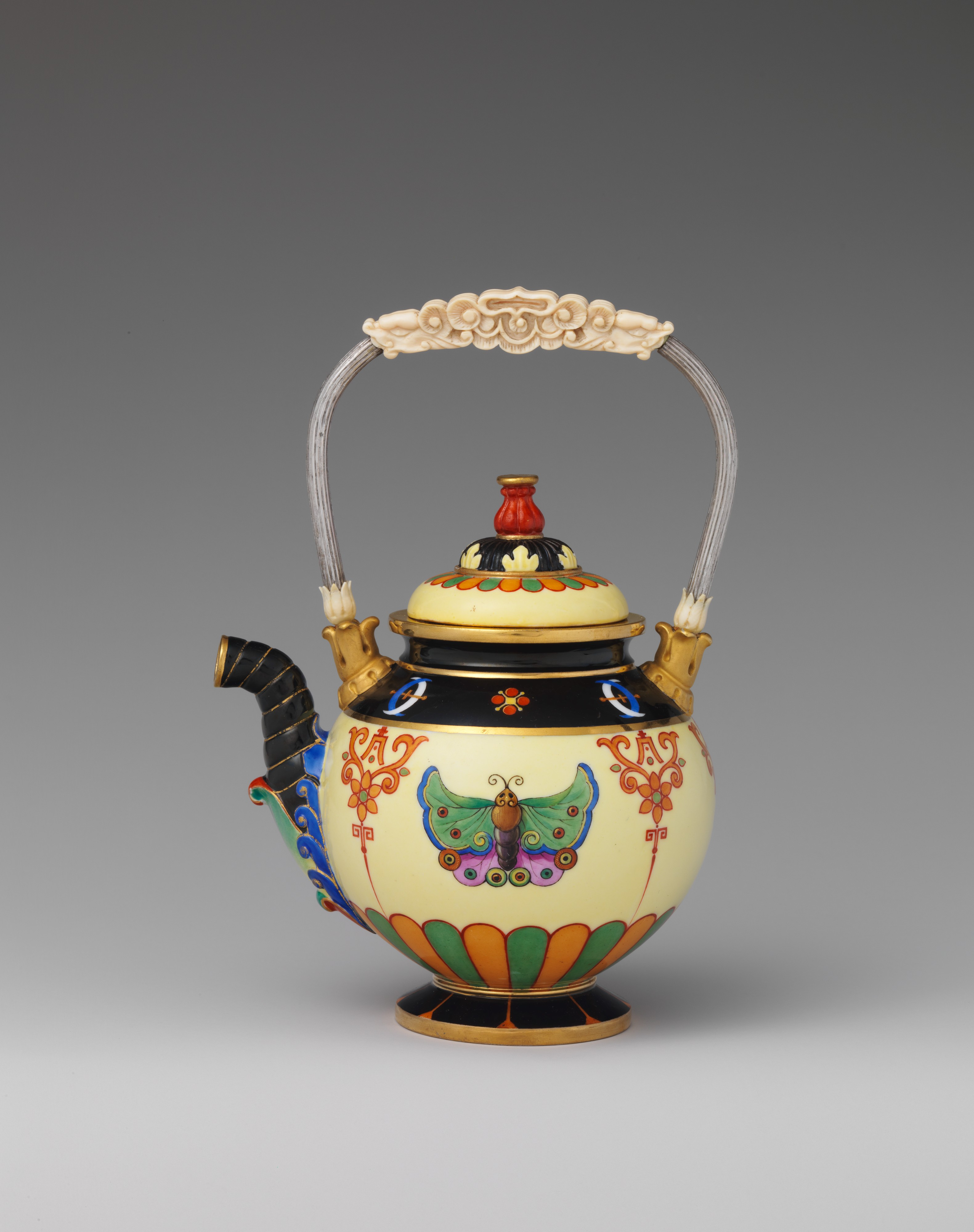
Teapot, Sèvres, 1832.

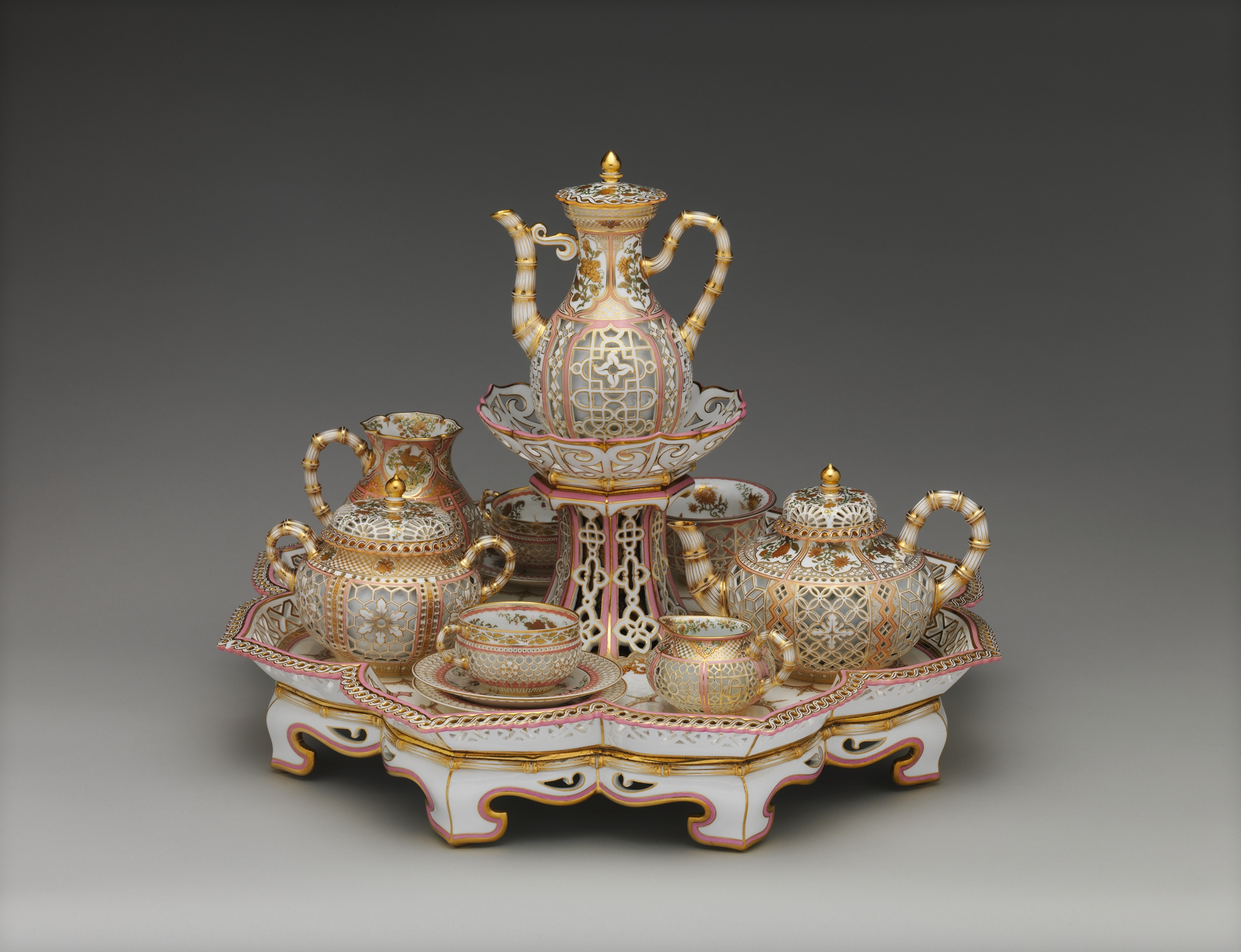
Tea and coffee service known as the "Déjeuner chinois réticulé". Masterpiece of the Sèvres factory, one of the last ten known examples, circa 1840.

The twentieth century saw the creation of a style known as "métissage anglais", based on English silver-plated teapots but produced in tinted bisque porcelain. Also in the 20th century, Mariage Frères collaborated with prominent artists: Wilhelm Wagenfeld designed a tea service in the 1930s, heralding the era of industrial design in teaware; later, Le Corbusier designed a teapot in the functionalist style.

== Tea in French culture ==
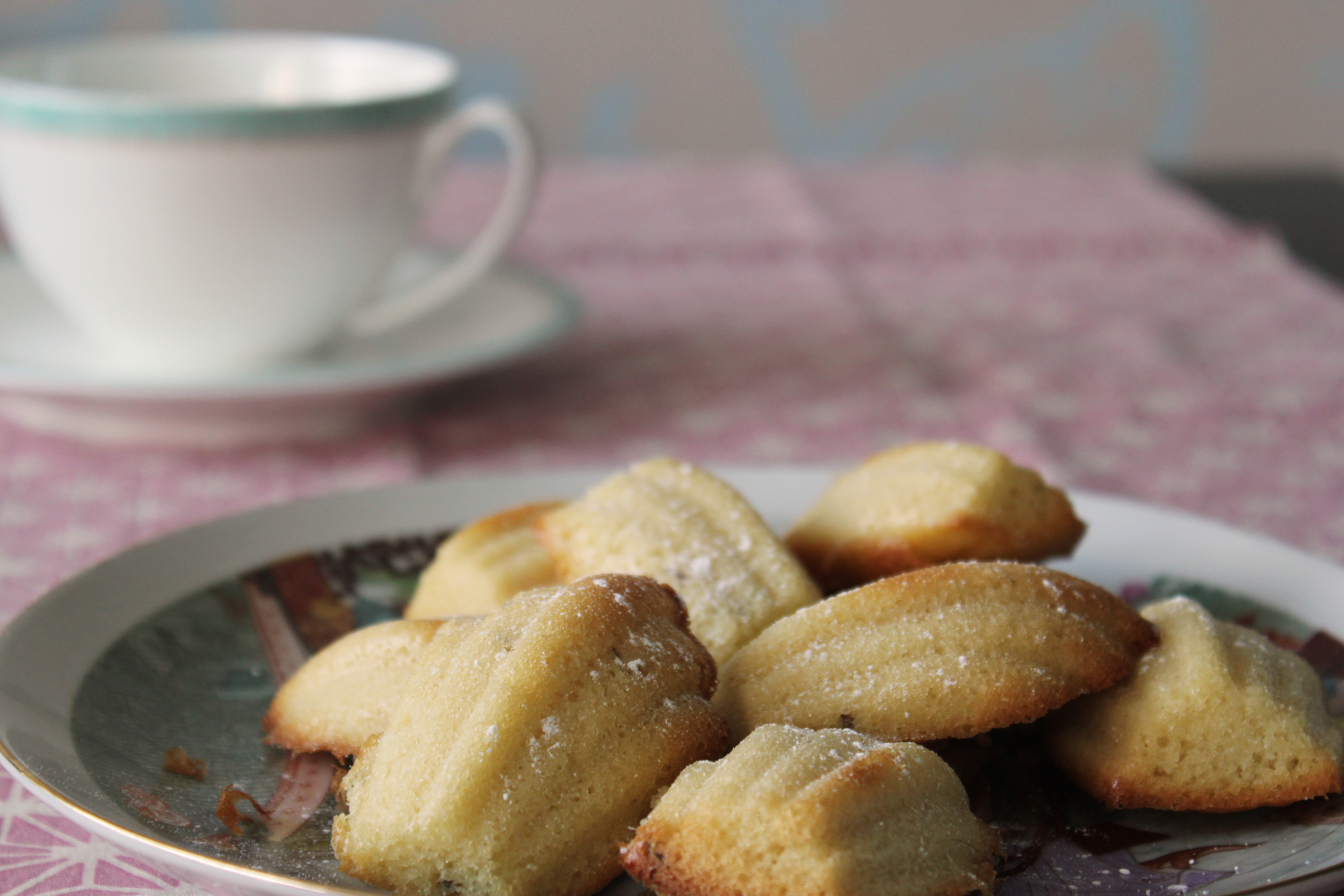
Proust's madeleine episode, in which the narrator of Du côté de chez Swann plunges back into childhood by tasting a madeleine dipped in tea, is one of the most famous in French literature.

In Marcel Proust's novel Du côté de chez Swann, the narrator relives his childhood over a madeleine dipped in tea:

"...all the flowers in our garden and those in Mr. Swann's park, and the water lilies in the Vivonne, and the good people of the village and their little dwellings and the church and all Combray and its surroundings, all that which takes shape and solidity, has come out, town and gardens, from my cup of tea."

So famous is this passage that it coined Proust's expression madeleine to refer to the phenomenon of reminiscence induced by a scent. It also contributed to the lasting association in the French mind of tea and the bourgeois and aristocratic strata of society.

Another interpretation of tea in À la recherche du temps perdu is offered by the academic Jarrod Hayes: pointing out that the vocabulary of tea was widely used in Proust's time as a euphemism for homosexual relations between men ("tasse" and "tasse à thé" could refer to pissotières, "théière" and "tearoom" specifically to those where homosexuals meet to have sex, which are referred to as "prendre le thé"), he proposes a symbolic reading of many passages in the novel as evocative of Baron de Charlus's homosexuality.

In French pictorial culture, tea fulfills three functions. Firstly, it can serve as an accessory to orientalism, first in the 17th century as turquerie, and then from the 19th century onwards, inspired by North Africa; in this case, French fantasies are represented rather than a real vision of these regions.

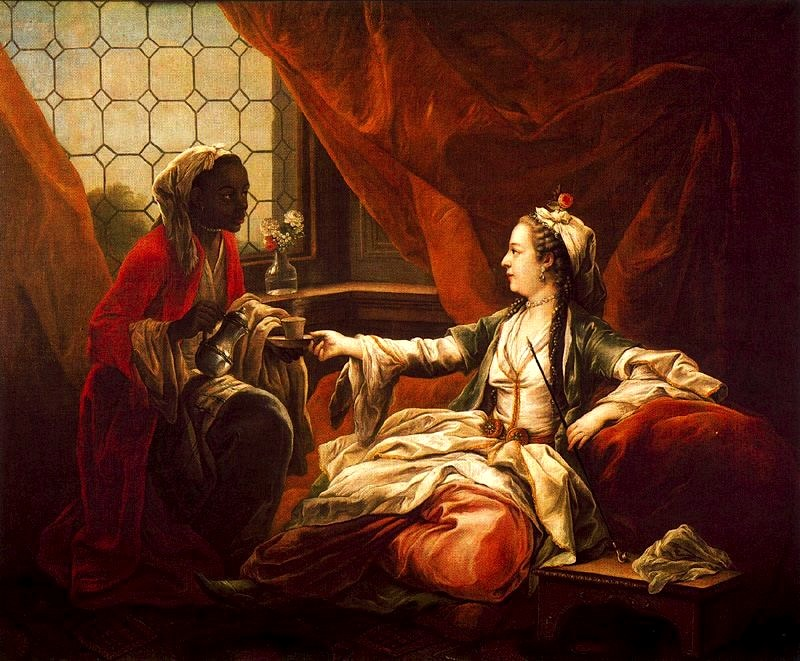
Sultane, representation of Madame de Pompadour by Charles André van Loo, 1747, Musée des Arts décoratifs.

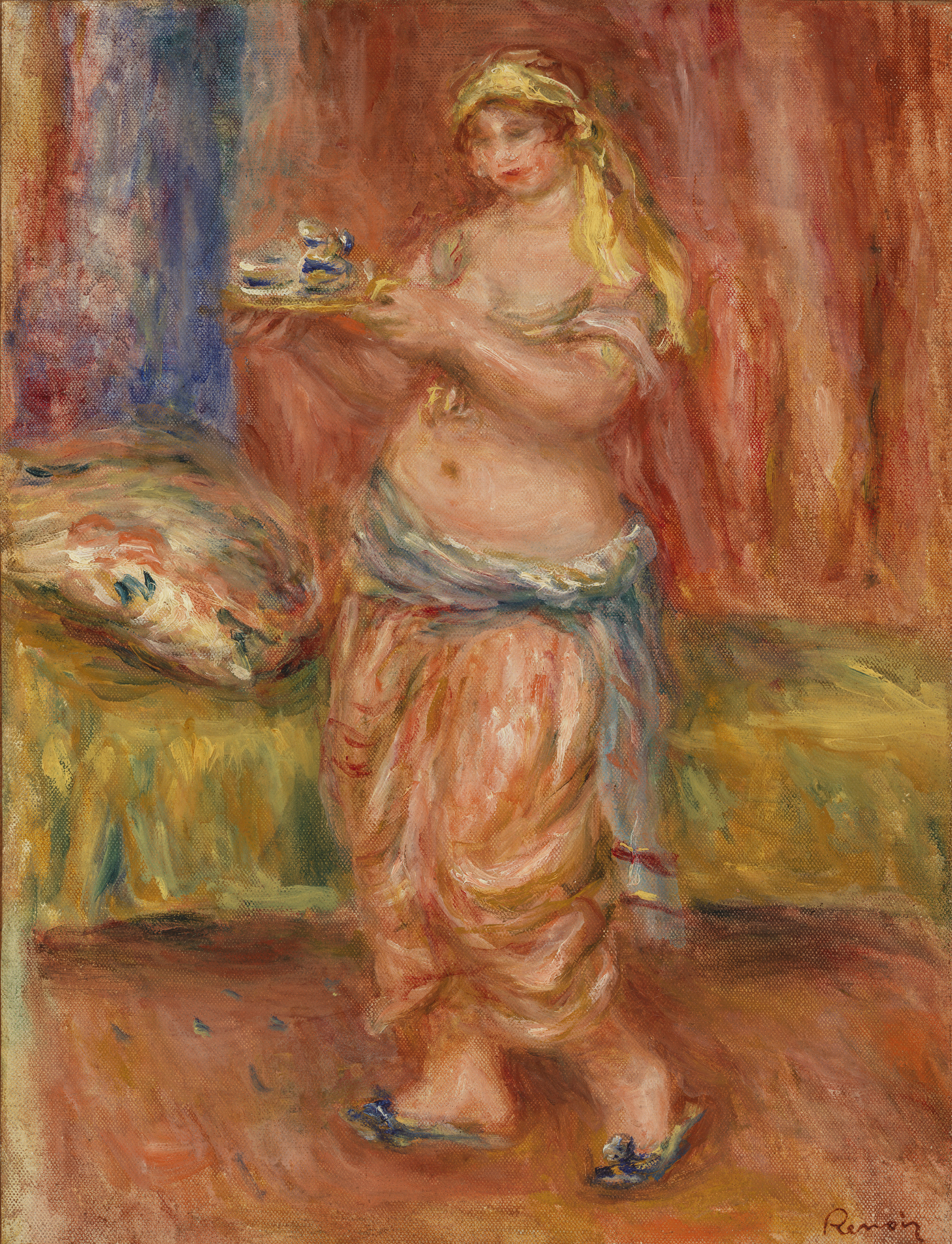
Odalisque à la théière, 1919, Auguste Renoir, Barnes Foundation.

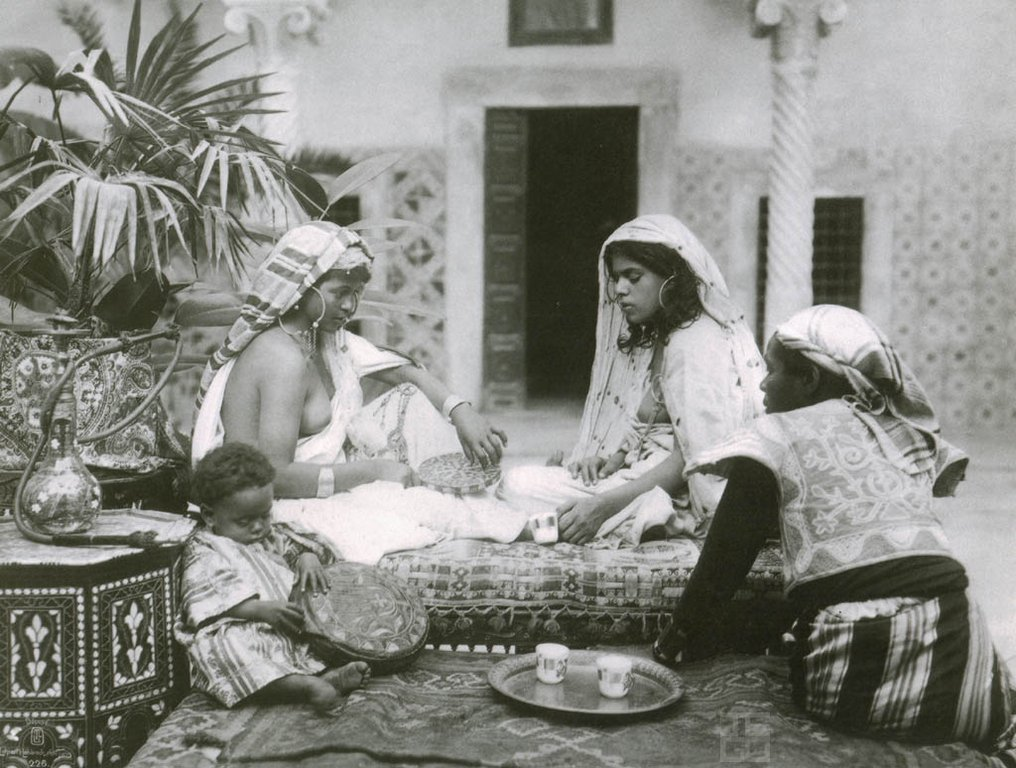
Tea on the patio, photograph by Rudolf Lehnert, 1910.

It can also be used to depict the gentleness of life, in the shade of gardens or indoors. Finally, tea and its accessories can enrich and renew the subjects depicted in still lifes.

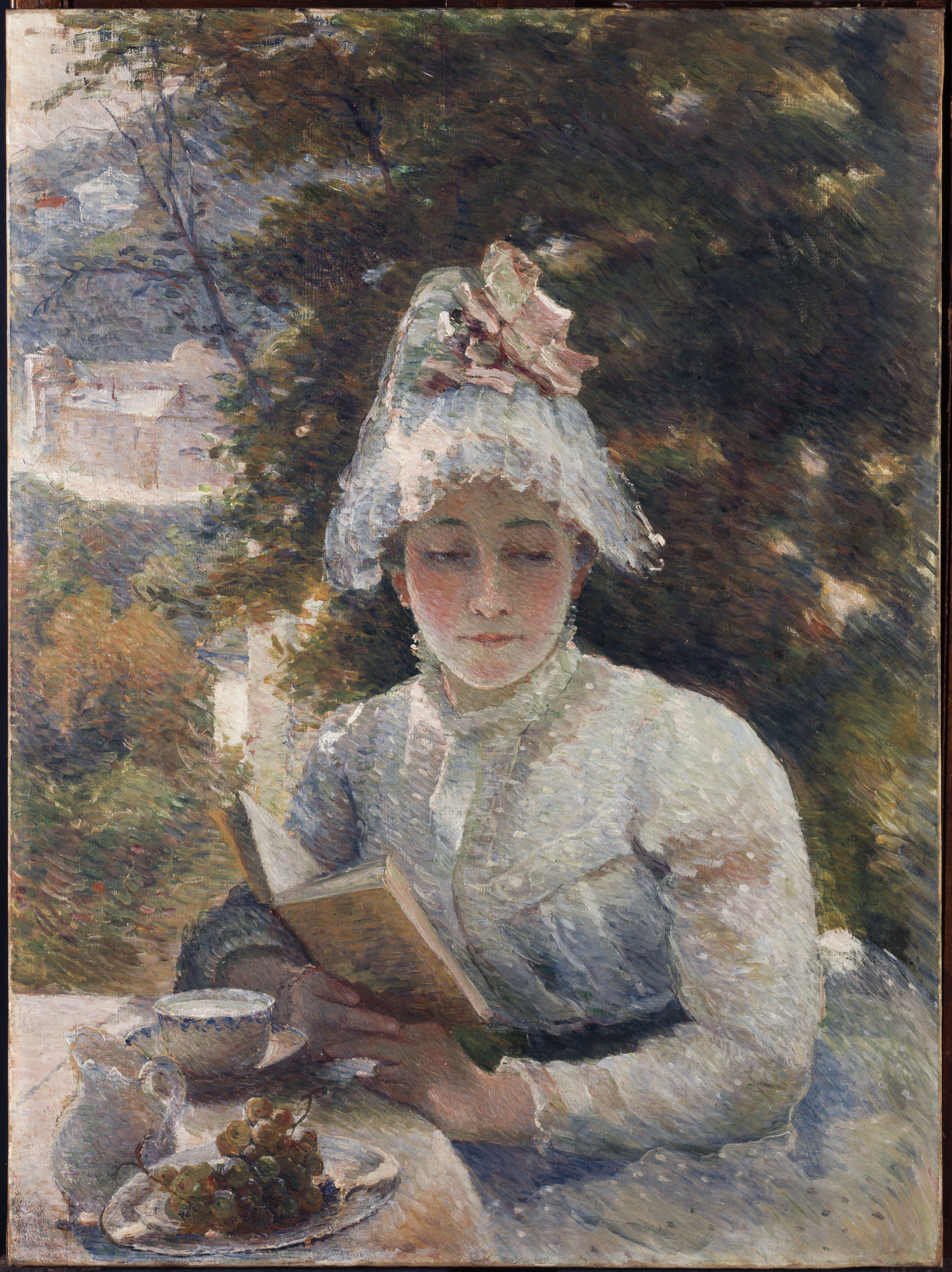
Le goûter, Marie Bracquemond, 1910, Musée des Beaux-Arts de la Ville de Paris.

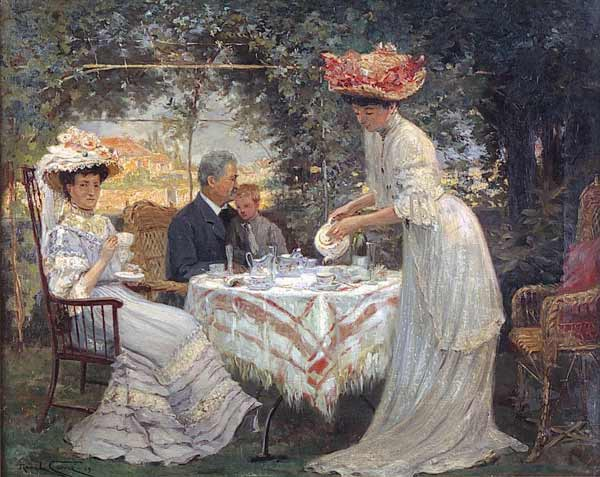
Le thé en famille, 1909, Raoul Carré, musée Sainte-Croix.

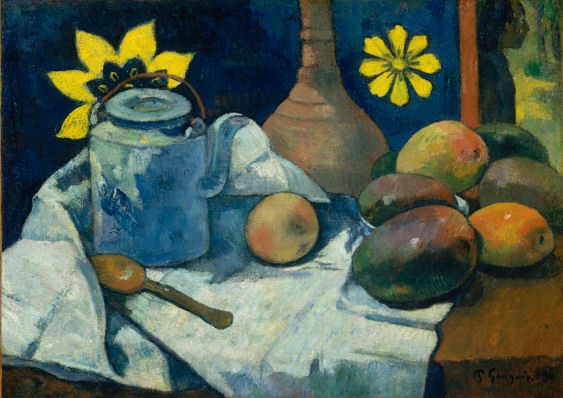
La théière et les fruits, Gauguin, 1896, MET.

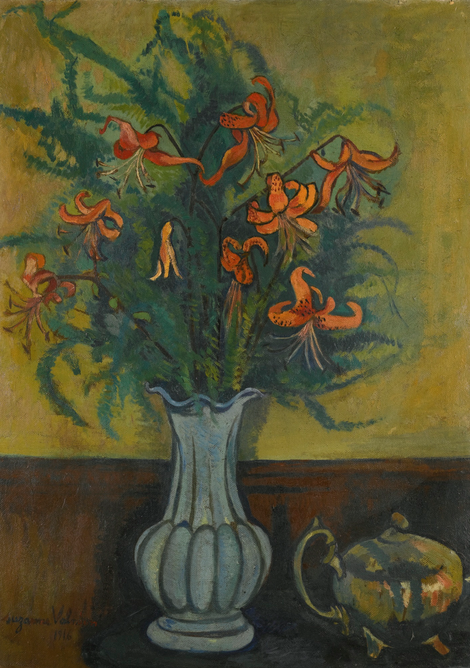
Vase de fleurs et théière, Suzanne Valadon, 1916

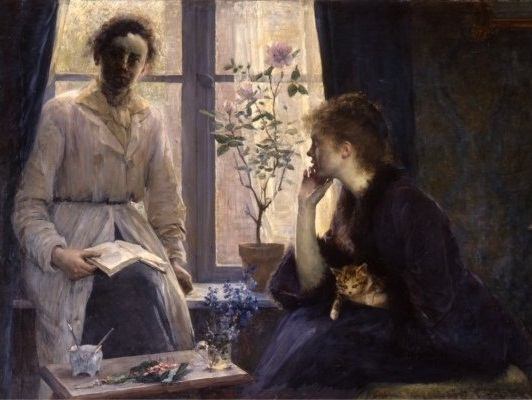
Contre-jour (or Le Thé de Cinq Heures), Louise Breslau, 1883. Museum of Fine Arts, Bern. The painting shows the artist at tea time with her companion Madeleine Zillhardt.

In the 20th and 21st centuries, mint tea was used by artists to talk about the descendants of immigrants in France. This is the case, for example, in French cinema, with Abdelkrim Bahloul's Le Thé à la menthe (1984) and Mehdi Charef's Le Thé au harem d'Archimède (1985), both about the second generation of immigrants who want to stay in France. This is also the case, almost thirty years later, with hip-hop artists, as in Josman's Un zder un thé or La Caution's Thé à la menthe: "Première époque bidonville, ambiance clandestine. In a bar in Barbès, mint tea, couscous and tajine on the menu. With a bad accent, no salamalecs," says Hassan the athlete from Algeria, from Hollywood to Tamanrasset. No more mint tea, just bitter palaver".

=== French relationship with tea ===
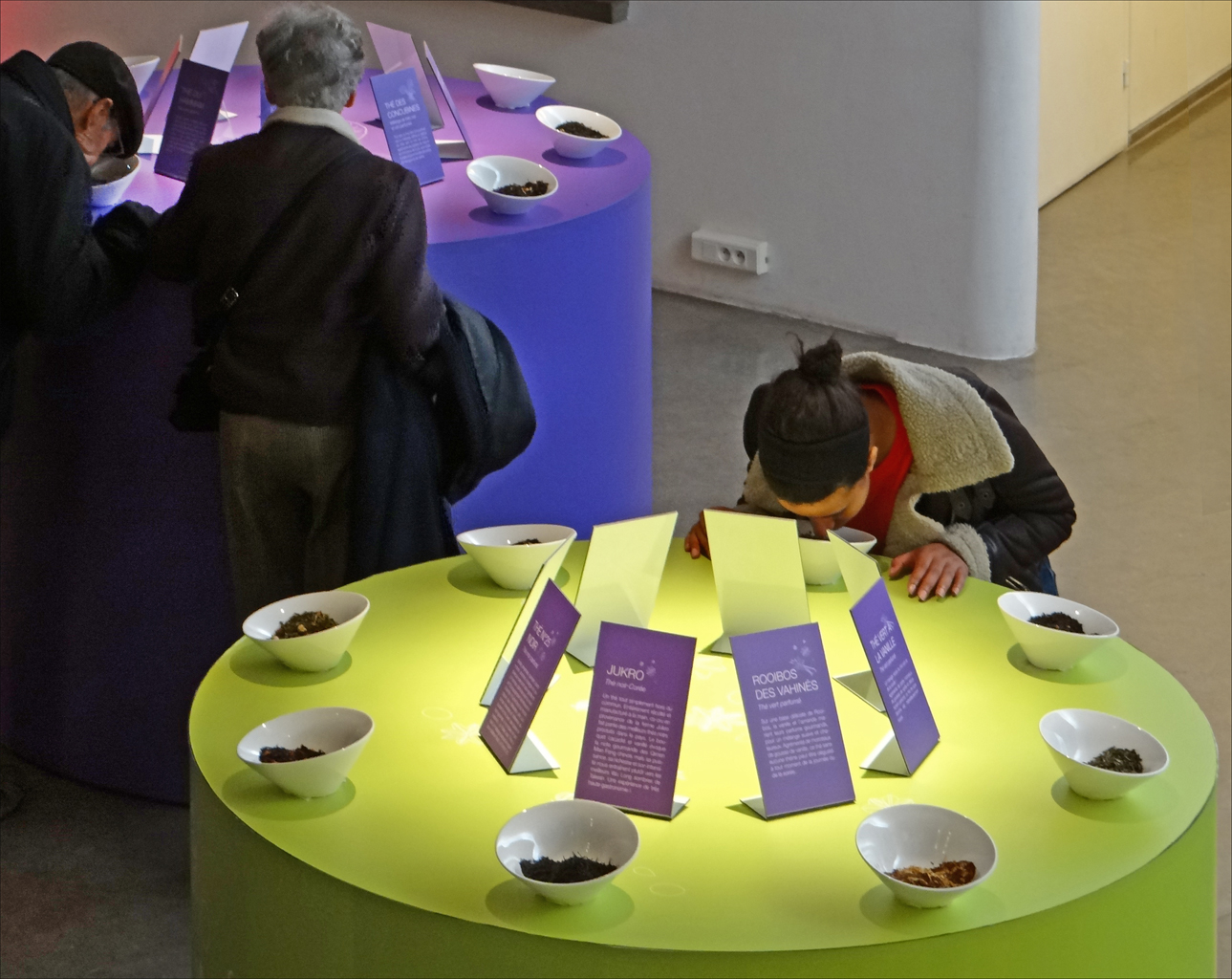
Le Thé - Histoires d'une boisson millénaire exhibition, Musée Guimet, 2013.

One explanation put forward for the low popularity of tea in France in the 1990s is a problem of representation: the French mistakenly believed that tea is limited to the low-quality teabags served in cafés and hotels at a modest cost and that it is necessarily full-bodied, whereas these are only the teas consumed in England, and therefore do not correspond to the French market. The growing interest in Chinese and Japanese civilizations in France at the turn of the 21st century, which accompanied the increase in tea sales, proved him right. This interest also stemmed from the falling cost of long-haul flights at the beginning of the 21st century, which enabled more French people to travel and discover cultures where tea is central. This French interest can be seen in the exhibitions Le Thé - Histoires d'une boisson millénaire at the Musée national des Arts asiatiques - Guimet in 2013 and Thé, café ou chocolat? L'essor des boissons exotiques au xviiie siècle in 2015 at the Musée Cognacq-Jay or by the foundation of tea schools, one oriented towards popularization and founded in 1999 by the Palais des thés, the other towards gastronomy and created 10 years later by the Institut Paul Bocuse.

Despite this renewed interest, the French still lag behind other cultures where tea is ubiquitous in their ability to distinguish between different teas, with a 2013 study showing that they are on average less able than Koreans to distinguish between two green teas.

The French vocabulary of tea tasting borrows heavily from enology: terroir, techniques, geography, chemistry, but also the subjectivity of tasting, the description of the tea liquor, whose color is described in the same way as a wine's dress, fragrances, astringency and harvesting method; the impatience surrounding the first spring harvests in Darjeeling is reminiscent of the celebration of the grape harvest and Beaujolais nouveau. But it's also a terrain for escapism and poetic evocation, in keeping with French table culture, where we eat, talk, and talk about what we eat.

For Kitti Cha Sangmanee of Mariage Frères, what characterizes French tea is a quest for flavor diversity, a blend of respect for taste standards, and a taste for novelty. He also likens the French relationship with tea to that of Paris about cuisine: products may not be grown locally, but it is a nerve center to which foodstuffs converge to be magnified and appreciated. Tastes for aromas evolve: red fruits and vanilla give way to citrus, spices, and turmeric, while rose and jasmine remain classics.

=== Image of French tea in foreign cultures ===
The overall image of France is that of a country of gastronomy, coffee and wine, but this vision is rapidly changing with the export of French teas and tourist visits to France.

French tea houses work hard to create the image of "French tea", associated with luxury and sophistication, in the image of French perfumery or haute couture.

== See also ==
- Herbal tea
- Tea in Turkey
- Tea in the United Kingdom

== Bibliography ==
- Pettigrew, Jane (2018). World of tea. Hoffman Media. ISBN 978-1-940772-51-6. OCLC 1043926696.
- Rival, Pierre (2017). Le thé pour les nuls. Paris: First éditions. ISBN 978-2-7540-8455-0. OCLC 1016908996.
- Sangmanee, Kitti Cha (1996). L'ABCdaire du thé. Mariage Frères. ISBN 2-08-012480-3. OCLC 319936246.
- Yi, Sabine; Walsh, Michel (1990), Le livre de l'amateur de thé, R. Laffont, OCLC 41574958
- Houssaye, J.-G. (1843). Monographie du thé: description botanique, torréfaction, composition chimique, propriétés hygiéniques de cette feuille. L'auteur.
