= Ventseslav Kuzmichev =

Russian sailor

Vyatcheslav Kuzmichev
Personal information
- Full name: Vyatcheslav Kuzmichev
- Born: Вячеслав Павлович Кузмичев; 1878
- Died: 1946 (aged 67–68)

Sailing career
- Sport: Sailing
- Class: 8 Metre

Ventseslav Kuzmichev (Russian: Вячеслав Павлович Кузмичев, romanized: Vyatcheslav Pavlovich Kuzmichev), also Kousmichoff, was an entrepreneur and sailor from Russia, who represented his country at the 1912 Summer Olympics in Nynäshamn, Sweden in the 8 Metre. Creator of the brand Kusmi Tea.

In 1907, Vyatcheslav opened a shop at 11 Queen Victoria Street, London. In 1908, on his father's death, Vyatcheslav took over the reins of the family business.

The business continued to prosper under Vyatcheslav, and by 1917, at the onset of the Russian Revolution, the business had grown to encompass a chain of 51 tea houses across most major cities in Russia. With the outbreak of the revolution, the Kousmichoff family fled to France, opening an outlet at 75 Avenue Niel, Paris, that exists to this day. At this point, the Kousmichoffs re-branded the tea to the shorter "Kusmi Tea".
