= Kusmi Tea =

Brand of tea

- Company type: Private
- Industry: Food
- Founded: 1867; 159 years ago in Saint Petersburg, Russia
- Founder: Pavel Kousmichoff
- Headquarters: Paris, France
- Number of locations: 80
- Website: kusmitea.com

Kusmi Tea is a brand of tea, headquartered in Paris, France. Originally founded by Pavel Kousmichoff in St. Petersburg, Russia in 1867, the brand moved to Paris, at the onset of the Russian Revolution, in 1917. The brand is currently owned by Groupe Orientis.

== History ==
The founder of Kusmi Tea, Pavel Kousmichoff (from whom the brand gains its name) left home at the age of 14 to work for a tea merchant in St. Petersburg, Russia. Kousmichoff worked with the tea merchant until his marriage in 1867, when Kousmichoff was given a small tea house by the tea merchant.

Under Kousmichoff, the business prospered and grew in popularity, by 1880 becoming a favourite of the Russian nobility. By 1901, the firm had expanded the business to a chain of about 10 tea houses. In 1907, Kousmichoff's son Vyatcheslav opened a shop at 11 Queen Victoria Street, London. In 1908, on the death of his father, Vyatcheslav took over the reins of the family business.

The business continued to prosper under Vyatcheslav, and by 1917, at the onset of the Russian Revolution the business had grown to encompass a chain of 51 tea houses across most major cities in Russia. With the outbreak of the revolution, the Kousmichoff family fled to France, opening an outlet at 75 Avenue Niel, Paris; this location operated as a tea house through the early 21st century, until it was closed to the public and converted to a training studio for company staff and partners. In the move to Paris, the Kousmichoffs re-branded to the shorter "Kusmi Tea."

In 2003, the business was bought by Groupe Orientis.

The firm currently operates 80 stores, including 60 in France itself, while the tea is distributed in 35 countries.
