= Palais des Thés =

Tea company founded in Paris, 1986

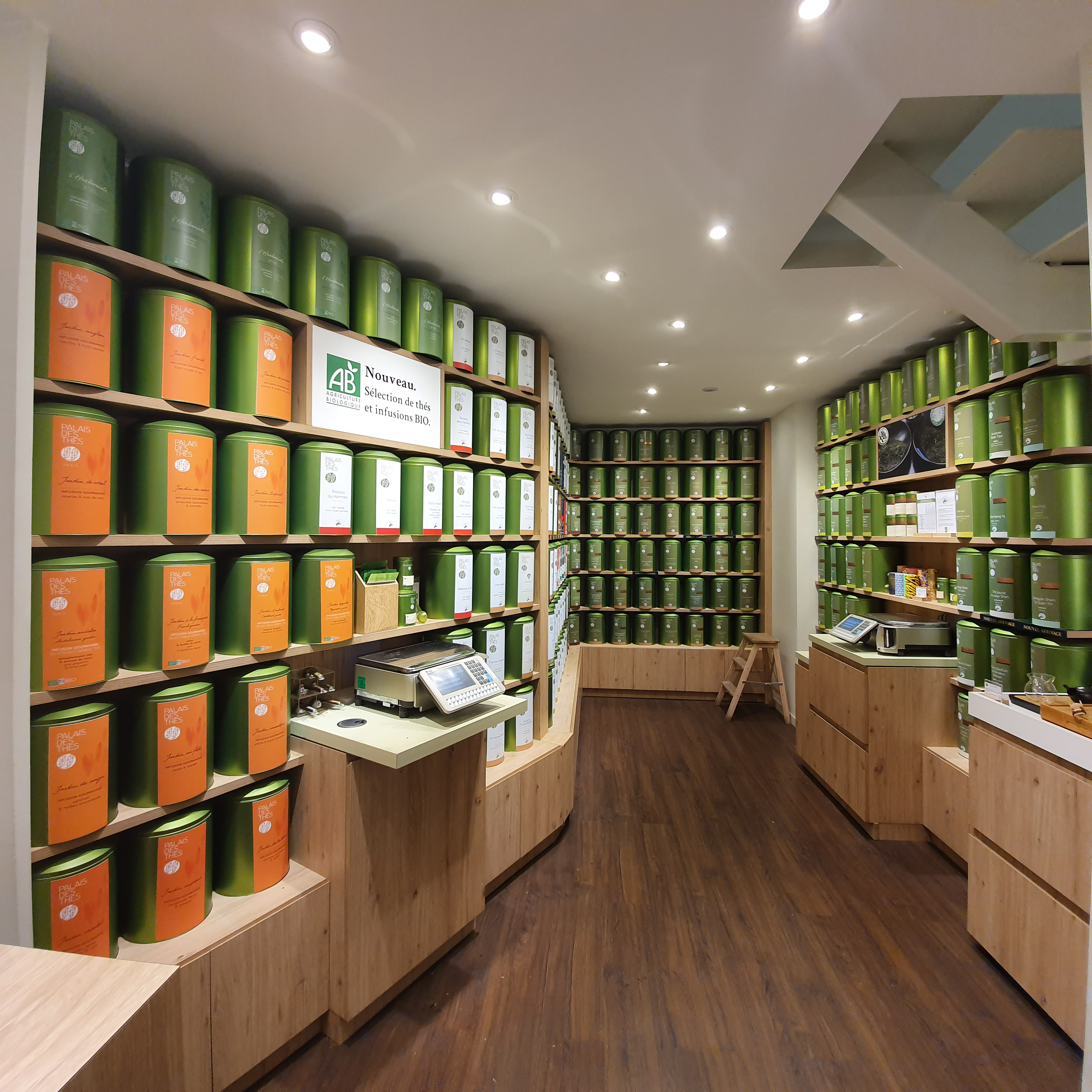
Interior of a shop

Palais des Thés is a tea company founded in Paris in 1986. It has 100 specialty tea shops in France, Israel, Norway, Belgium, Luxembourg, Denmark and Russia. The company specializes in direct tea sourcing and commercialization of more than 200 teas as well as tea gifts and accessories.

== History ==
=== Origins ===
Julien Spiess founded Palais des Thés in 1986. His goal was to democratize tea and help the Occident to learn more about its cultural and gastronomical aspects. The first shop opens rue de l’Abbé Grégoire in the 6th arrondissement of Paris.

== Palais des Thés shops ==
Most of Palais des Thés shops include three spaces: the tea wall where 100+ teas are available in bulk, a gift section and a third section dedicated to the tea accessories (including teapots, cups, strainers, etc.).

In 1991, Palais des Thés opened its first store outside of France, in Tokyo. Palais des Thés then opened new shops in Brussels (2001 and 2007), Oslo (2006 and 2007), Dublin (2008), Tel-Aviv (2010) and Copenhagen (2023), Moscow (2023). The Dublin and Tokyo stores have been closed for several years now.

In 2011, Aurelie Pasquet and Cyrille Bessiere launched Palais des Thés in the USA. As of 2026, there are no retail stores in the USA.

== Additional Resources ==
- (in French) Le Guide Théophile Le Palais des Thés - 2008 - Dépot légal : janvier 2002 - ISBN 2-9517419-0-1
- (in English) The Theophile Guide - Legal registration: March 2003 - ISBN 2-9517419-1-X
- (in French) Le guide de dégustation de l’amateur de thé François-Xavier Delmas, Mathias Minet et Christine Barbaste - Les Editions du Chêne - 2007 - Dépot légal : 84527, mai 2007 - ISBN 2-9517419-2-8
- (in English) The Tea lover’s guide - Legal registration: 84528, March 2007 - ISBN 2-9517419-3-6
