= Tea culture in Japan =

Ancient Japanese cultural tradition

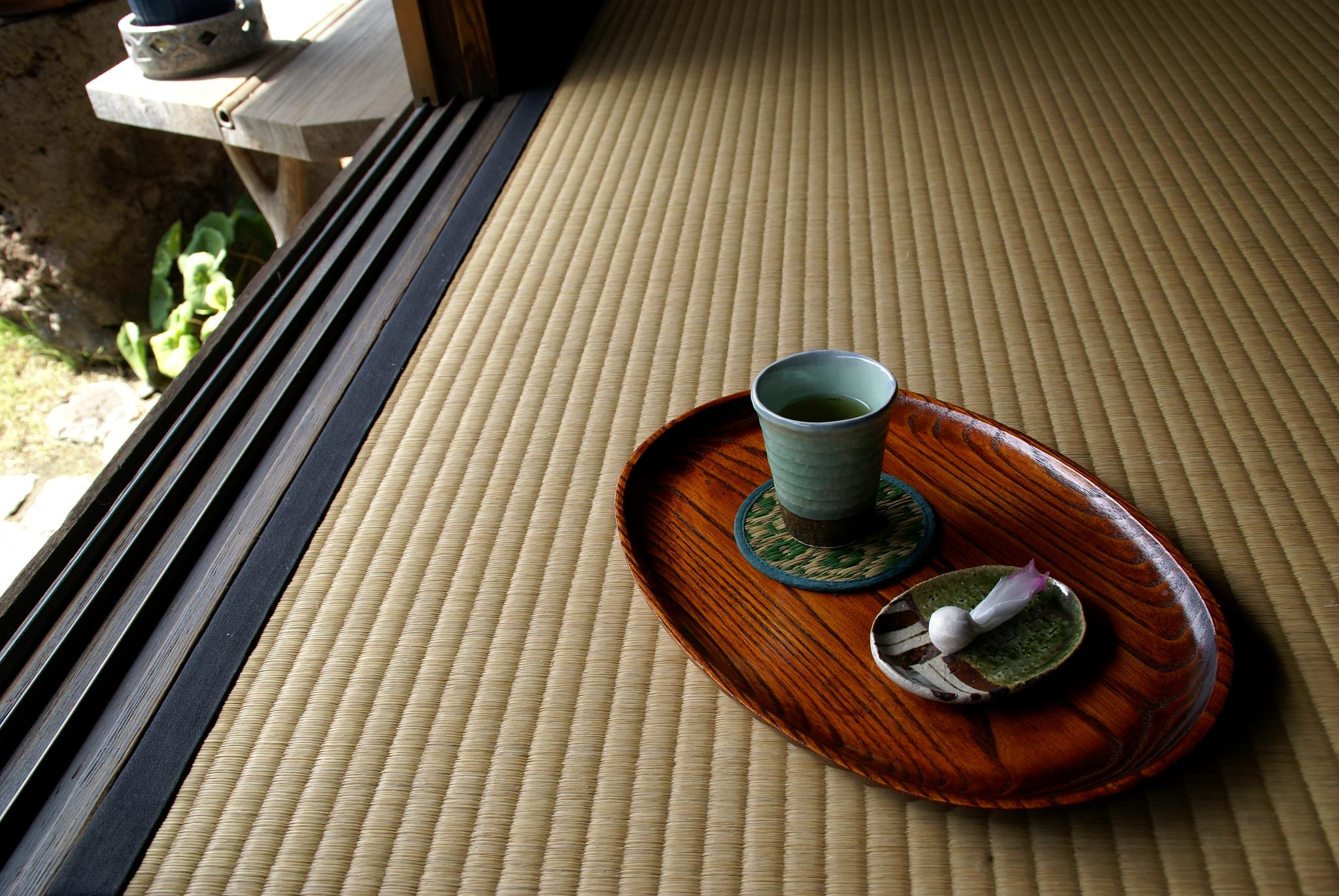
Tea with its utensils for daily consumption

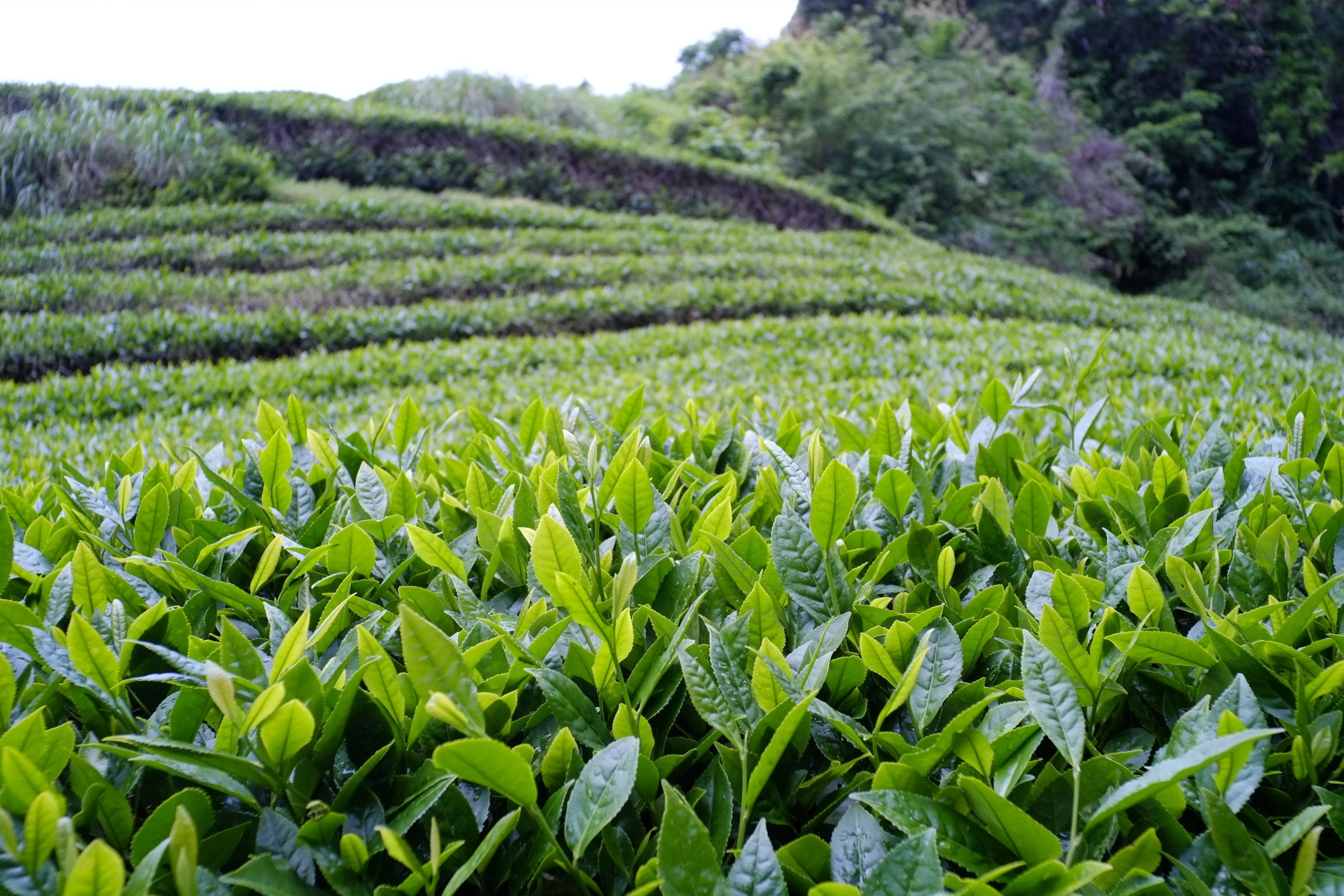
Tea plantation in Shizuoka Prefecture

Tea (茶, cha) is an important part of Japanese culture. It first appeared in the Nara period (710–794), introduced to the archipelago by ambassadors returning from China, but its real development came later, from the end of the 12th century, when its consumption spread to Zen temples, also following China's example; it was then powdered tea that was drunk after being beaten (called matcha today). In the Middle Ages, tea became a common drink for the elite, and in the 16th century, the art of the "tea ceremony" was formalized. It is now one of the most emblematic elements of Japanese culture, whose influence extends beyond the simple context of tea drinking. Tea-growing developed in the pre-modern era, particularly during the Edo period (1603–1868), when tea became a popular beverage consumed by all strata of society. New ways of processing and consuming tea leaves were developed, starting with sencha, a steamed oxidation-stopped brew that became the most common.

Today a handful of prefectures share the cultivation of tea plantations (Shizuoka, Kagoshima, Mie), whose mostly mechanically picked leaves are used to produce green teas, primarily sencha, but also lesser-known varieties such as bancha, or more elaborate varieties like gyokuro. Certain terroirs have a long-standing reputation for producing quality teas, first and foremost Uji in the Kyoto Prefecture. With an annual production of around 80,000 tonnes, Japan is still not a major tea producer on a global scale, nor is it a major exporter or even importer, since it consumes most of its own production. Tea leaves are now mainly used to make tea drinks sold in plastic bottles, a fast-moving consumer product that has become popular in society in the 2010s and is available in many variants. From the mid-2000s onwards, tea consumption supplanted that of loose leaves, while at the same time, other beverages such as coffee and soft drinks have overtaken tea in Japanese household spending. Tea consumption is also being renewed by the development of new products and increased use of matcha tea powder in gastronomy.

Tea has long enjoyed great importance in Japanese culture, which has adopted many elements of Chinese tea culture, but has also added its own, starting with the tea ceremony, which conquered the milieu of the medieval elites, then was promoted in modern times as one of the characteristic elements of traditional Japanese culture, and is presented as such on tourist sites and at diplomatic events. It has given rise to a specific aesthetic, concerning both the places where the ceremony is held and the objects used, which are the object of great attention both in their design and in their use, thus contributing to the "cult of the object" typical of Japanese aesthetics.

== History of tea in Japan up to modern times ==
=== First steps ===
Japan's first contact with tea is thought to have taken place during the Nara period (710–794), when Japan sent several diplomatic missions to Xi'an, the capital of the Tang dynasty. These early delegations brought back Chinese cultures and practices, as well as paintings, literature and other artifacts. The Chakyō shōsetsu records emperor Shōmu serving powdered tea to monks in 729, but the text is somewhat unreliable and may therefore contain errors.

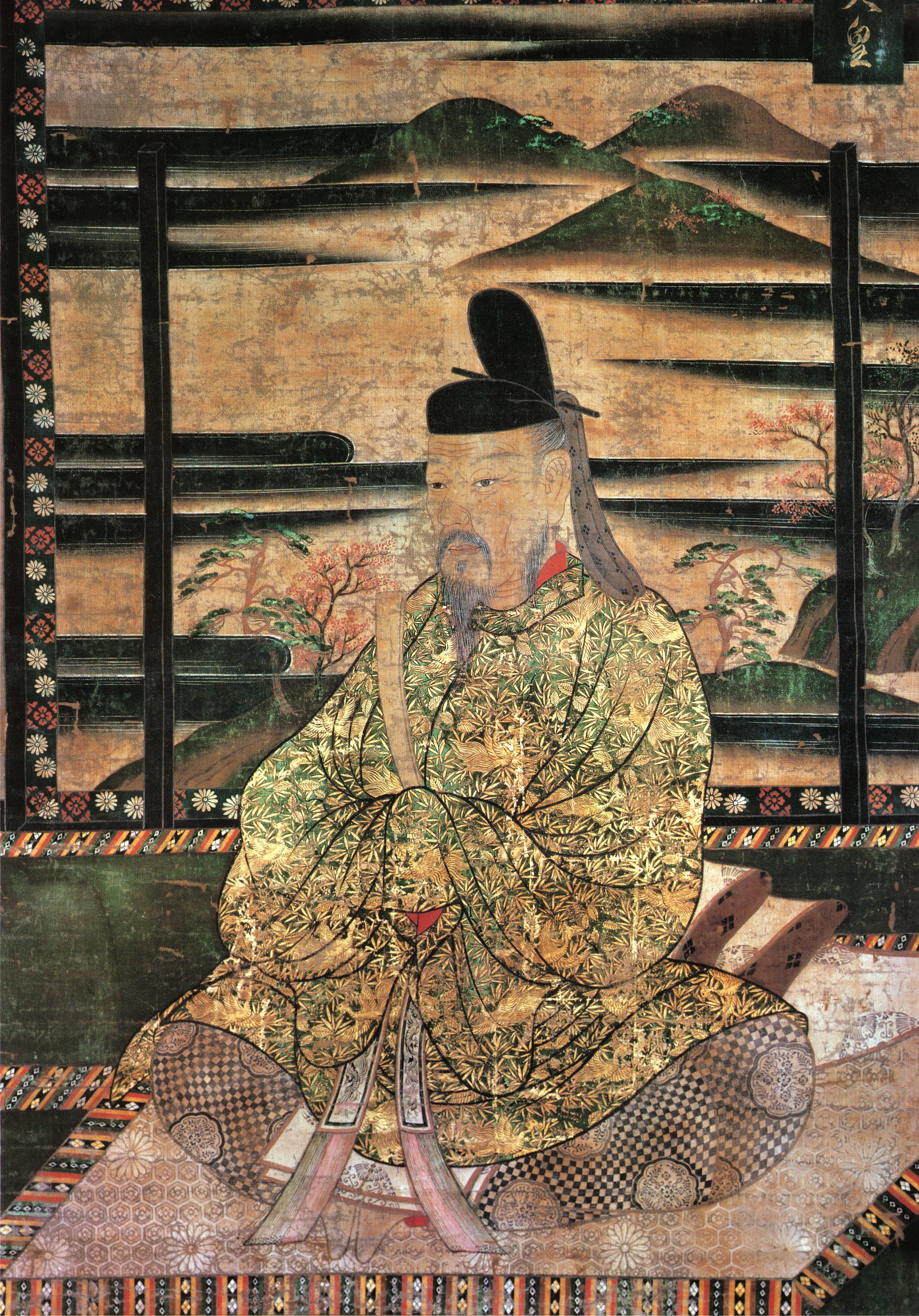
Emperor Saga

In 804, Buddhist monks Kūkai and Saichō set off to study religion in China on a mission funded by the Heian-era government. The Shōryōshū mentions Kūkai drinking tea during his trip, before his return to Japan in 806. He is also the first to mention chanoyu (茶の湯), which would later refer to the Japanese tea ceremony. Back in Japan, at least one of the two monks brought tea tree seeds back home; popular belief has it that this was Saichō, although there is no evidence to confirm or deny this.

The Kuikū Kokushi states that in 815, a Buddhist abbot served tea to Emperor Saga. This is the first attested mention of the use of tea in Japan. After tasting it, the emperor ordered the creation of five tea plantations near the capital. Emperor Saga was known for his sinophilia, which manifested itself in his passion for tea. A lover of Chinese poetry, he in turn wrote poems, many of which mentioned tea drinking.

More recent texts from the Heian period indicate that tea was grown and consumed, in small quantities, by Buddhist monks for religious purposes. Nobility and the imperial family also drank tea. The practice, however, did not spread beyond these circles. In the three centuries following Emperor Saga's death, interest in Chinese culture declined in Japan, and tea consumption suffered. The books of the time, however, continued to mention tea for its medicinal and stimulating virtues, and there was occasional mention of a mixture of tea and milk, a practice that soon disappeared.

The tea consumed at the time in Japan was certainly the tea brick (団茶, dancha), which was its most common form in China during the Tang dynasty. The first monograph on the subject of tea, Lu Yu's The Classic of Tea, was written a few decades before the arrival of Kūkai and Saichō. In it, Lu Yu describes the cooking and compression of tea into bricks, followed by the drinking process of grinding the brick into powder and mixing it with hot water until it froths. This may have inspired the powdered matcha that later emerged in Japan.

=== Eisai and the rise in popularity of tea ===
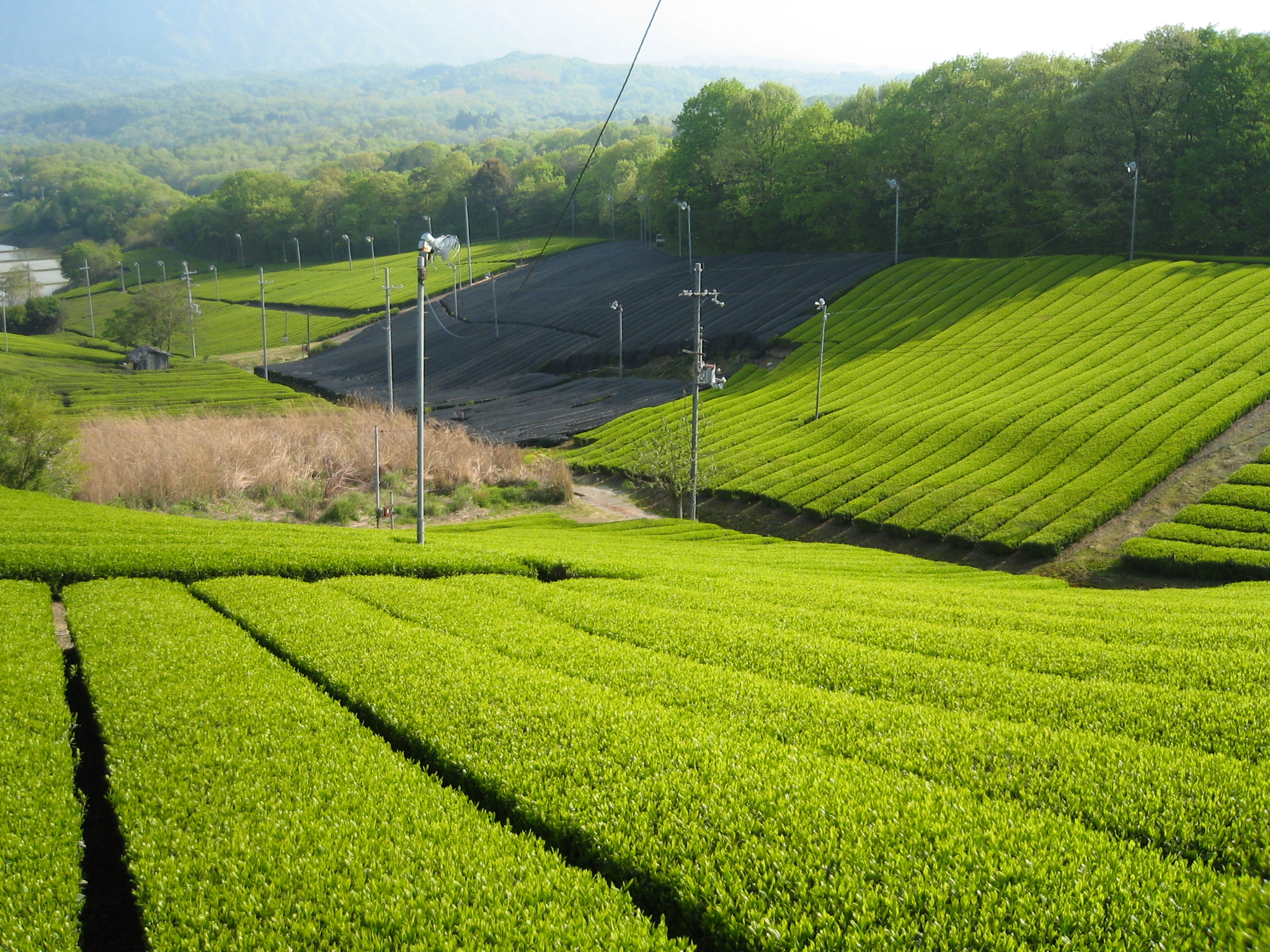
Tea plantation at Minamiyamashiro, Kyoto

The Zen monk Eisai (1141–1215), founder of the Rinzai current of Buddhism, is generally considered to be responsible for the rise in popularity of tea in Japan. In 1191, he returned from a trip to China with tea-tree seeds, which he planted on the island of Hirado and in the mountains of Kyūshū. He gives other seeds to the monk Myōe, abbot of the Kōzan-ji temple in Kyoto. The latter planted the seeds in Toganoo (栂尾) and Uji, which became the first major tea plantations in Japan. Toganoo tea was considered the best tea in Japan and was called "real tea" (本茶, honcha) as opposed to "non-tea" (非茶, hicha) produced elsewhere in Japan. In the 15th century, Uji tea surpassed Toganoo tea in quality, and "real tea" became Uji tea.

In 1211, Eisai writes the first edition of Drinking Tea and Prolonging Life (喫茶養生記, Kissa yōjōki), Japan's first treatise on tea. The Kissa yōjōki promotes tea for its medicinal virtues. Its opening sentence reads, "Tea is the finest medicine for nourishing one's health; it is the secret of a long life." The preface describes how drinking tea can have a positive effect on the five vital organs of traditional Chinese medicine. Eisai believes that each of the five organs likes a different taste, and concludes that since tea's bitterness coincides with the heart's taste for bitterness, tea fortifies the heart. Eisai then lists tea's many supposed health benefits: dispelling fatigue, curing lupus, indigestion, beriberi, cardiovascular disease, and many others, in addition to its hydrating effect. The treatise does not dwell on drinking tea for entertainment, but only on its medical benefits.

Eisai introduced tea drinking to the samurai group. He presented his Kissa yōjōki to Shogun Minamoto no Sanetomo in 1214, when the latter was suffering from a hangover after drinking too much sake, and served him tea. Zen Buddhism also gained popularity during this period, particularly among the warrior class. In addition, Zen monk Dōgen wrote a set of texts regulating monastic life for his Eihei-ji community, later collected under the title Eihei Shingi ("Pure Rules [for the Zen Community]", and applied in many Sôtô School temples. For this, Dōgen relies on a Chinese text from 1103, written by Changlu Zongze and intended for Chán monasteries. This text includes remarks on the etiquette for serving tea during Buddhist rituals. Tea is thus at the heart of Zen practice. For his part, Rinzai master Musō Soseki asserts that "tea and Zen are the same".

=== Tea culture in medieval times ===
From the end of the Kamakura period (1185–1333) to the beginning of the Muromachi period (1336–1573), tea competitions (鬥茶, tōcha) became a popular form of entertainment. Unlike tea competitions in China, they aim to distinguish teas that have grown in different regions, in particular, to compare "real tea" and "non-tea". These events are known for their high stakes. Sasaki Takauji is particularly renowned for organizing these competitions, with lavish decorations, large quantities of food and sake, and dancing shows. This taste for extravagance and ostentation is referred to as 婆娑羅 (basara) and is the subject of numerous writings by scholars who strongly oppose it.

This type of gathering is described in the Treatise on Tea Tasting (Kissa ōrai) attributed to the monk Gen'e (1279–1350), which begins as soon as guests arrive at the host's residence, facing a strolling garden, where a first snack is offered. The guests are then invited to a room or pavilion, which is to be decorated with luxury, above all, with objects of Chinese origin in keeping with the customs of the time. Aesthetics took second place to sumptuousness in the gatherings of fine men of the period. This is where the tea tasting took place, served to guests in the proper order and accompanied by sweets. The ceremony is followed by a tea competition. The meeting concludes with an evening soaked in sake, during which the guests dance and sing merrily.

Shogun Ashikaga Yoshimasa (1435–1490) built the first tea house following the rules of the tea ceremony. This small room in his Higashiyama palace (in the building known as Tōgu-dō) enabled him to display his Chinese objects (唐もの, karamono) during tea ceremonies. The style of the room follows that of the shoin, the study rooms of Zen monks. The floor is covered with tatami mats, and there's a study desk built into the wall. These rooms are the ancestors of modern Japanese living rooms. The austerity of the tea rooms (茶室, chashitsu) is a step towards the Japanese tea ceremony that would emerge later.

Yoshimasa's tea master seems to have been Murata Jukō. He is known as the person who created the discreet, cool designs of the Japanese tea ceremony. He insisted on combining Chinese utensils and Japanese ceramics to harmonize the tastes of both countries. This deliberate use of very simple, even defective utensils, in the wabi-sabi spirit, is called wabi-cha. However, Jukō did not attach any particular importance to wabi: it was the disciple of one of his disciples, Takeno Jōō, who would impose it on both the utensils and the decoration of the tea room itself. Jōō's contribution marks the transition between the beginnings of Murata Jukō and the highly complex Japanese tea ceremony of Sen no Rikyū.

The sixteenth century saw the appearance of tea journals, kept by tea lovers from a group of wealthy merchants, who recorded brief accounts of tea meetings they attended. At the time, this was an exclusively male audience, drawn from the wealthy circles of Kyoto and the major trading cities (Sakai, Hakata) that had been won over by the art of tea. Significantly, for these people, it wasn't the tea they tasted that counted, since they didn't talk about it, but the guests, the beautiful objects displayed in their hosts' study rooms, and those used in the tea ceremony.

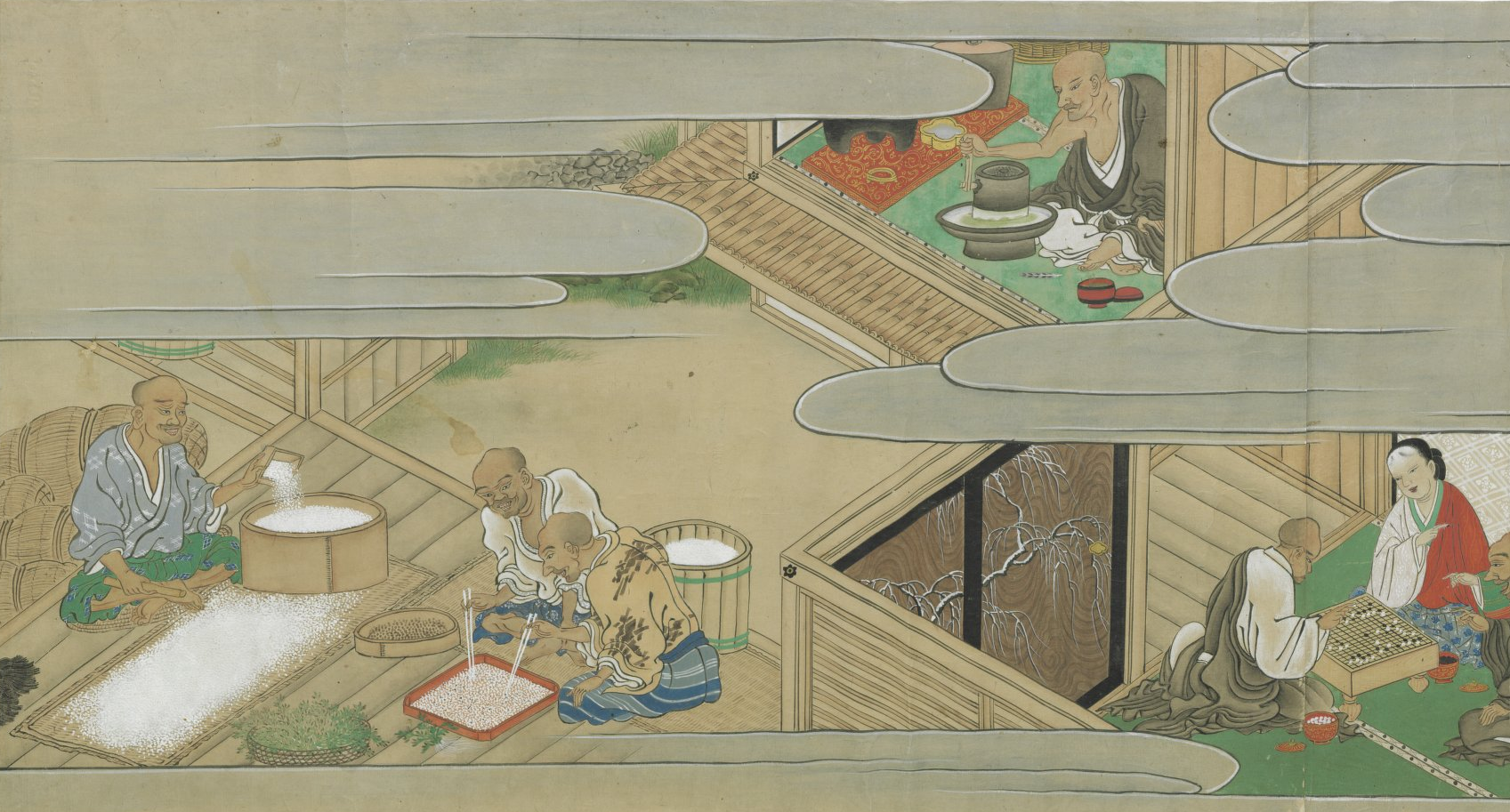
Excerpt from the Scroll on the Comparative Merits of Sake and Rice (Shuanron emaki): a figure prepares tea at the top right (scene 1). Bibliothèque nationale de France version, 17th or 18th-century copy from a 16th-century original.

In the Scroll on the Comparative Merits of Sake and Rice (Shuanron emaki), originally dated to the first half of the 16th century, tea is associated with rice and the monks' "lean meal" diet, shōjin-ryōri. It is often served with sweets. Tea snacks were also part of the "formal meal" (honzen-ryōri) that was being introduced at the same time among the warrior elites, interspersed with tastings that tended to be accompanied by sake, although the two were never served at the same time.

By the end of the 15th century, tea had become a widespread beverage among the lower strata of society. Tea plantations developed throughout the archipelago, supporting domestic demand. The most famous were those of Uji, south of Kyoto, described by the Jesuit missionary João Rodrigues in the late 16th century: they produced five different qualities of tea, the best being reserved for the elite. Shops selling tea had appeared in the capital Kyoto: a text from Tō-ji dated 1403 mentions a vendor set up next to the temple gate, selling tea for one copper coin a cup. Subsequent references to tea stores and itinerant tea merchants seem to have become commonplace.

=== Sen no Rikyū and the tea ceremony ===
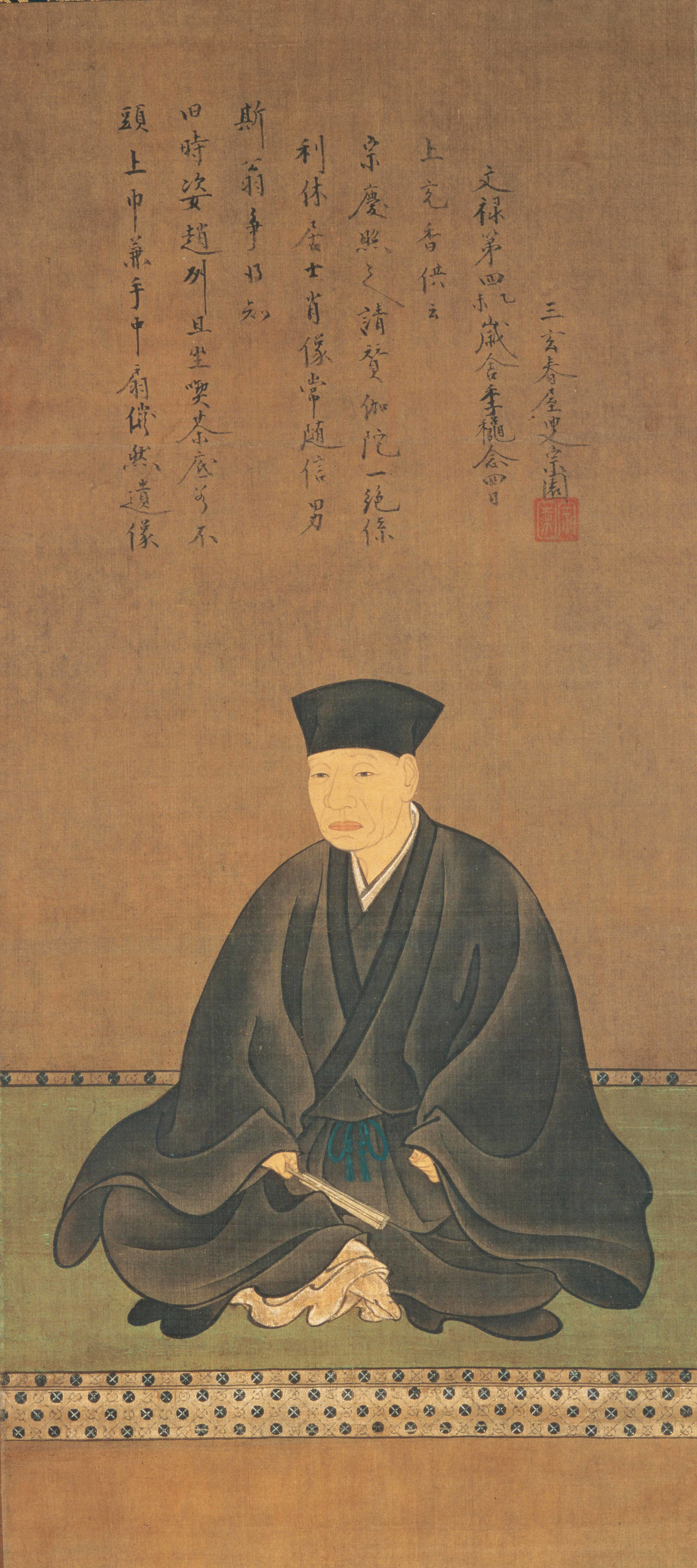
Portrait of tea master Sen no Rikyū (1522–1591), by Hasegawa Tōhaku

Sen no Rikyū (1522–1591) was the leading figure in the development of the Japanese tea ceremony. He was tea master to Oda Nobunaga and Toyotomi Hideyoshi. During the Sengoku period, political and social structures evolved very rapidly: although the son of a Sakai fishmonger, Rikyū was able to study tea with Takeno Jōō and, like his mentor, was inspired by the wabi style.

At the time, the tea ceremony played an important role in political life and diplomacy. Nobunaga even forbade the practice to become widespread, with the exception of his closest friends. Rikyū's austere wabicha style was replaced, for these political purposes, by a more lavish style. After Nobunaga's death, Sen no Rikyū entered the service of Toyotomi Hideyoshi and built him a wabi hut called Taian, which became one of Hideyoshi's favorite tea rooms. This room became the model for the wabi tea rooms that quickly came to dominate Japanese culture.

In addition to the architecture of the teahouse, Sen no Rikyū created the modern tea ceremony by imposing a precise procedure and utensils to be used. He also developed the idea of nijiriguchi (躙口, rump-entry), a small door that requires guests to crawl to enter the tea room.

In 1591, Hideyoshi forced Sen no Rikyū to commit suicide, but allowed his descendants and disciples to perpetuate his role as tea master.

=== The Edo period ===
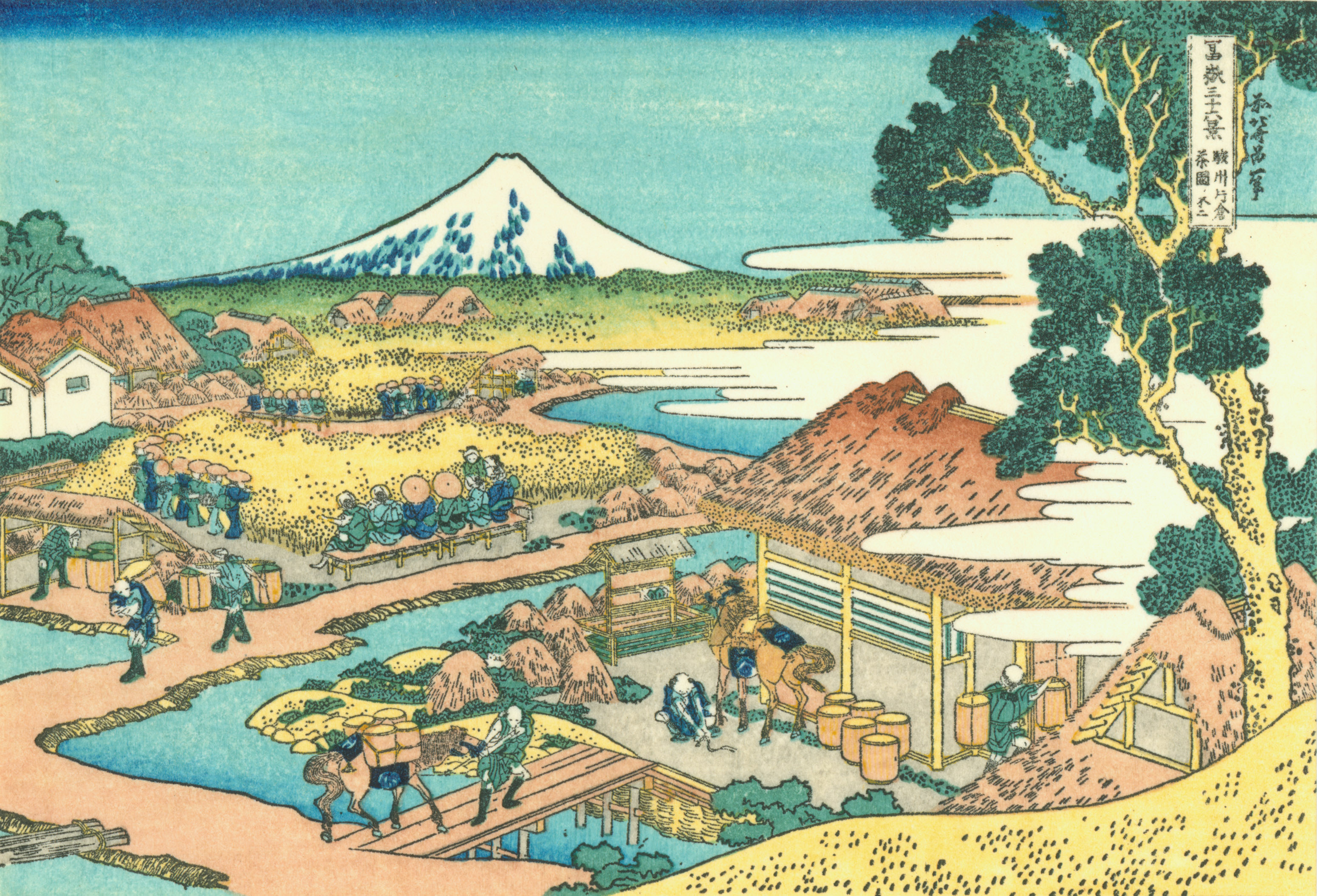
Mount Fuji as seen from the Katakura tea plantation in Suruga Province, series of Hokusai's Thirty-six Views of Mount Fuji, 1831–33

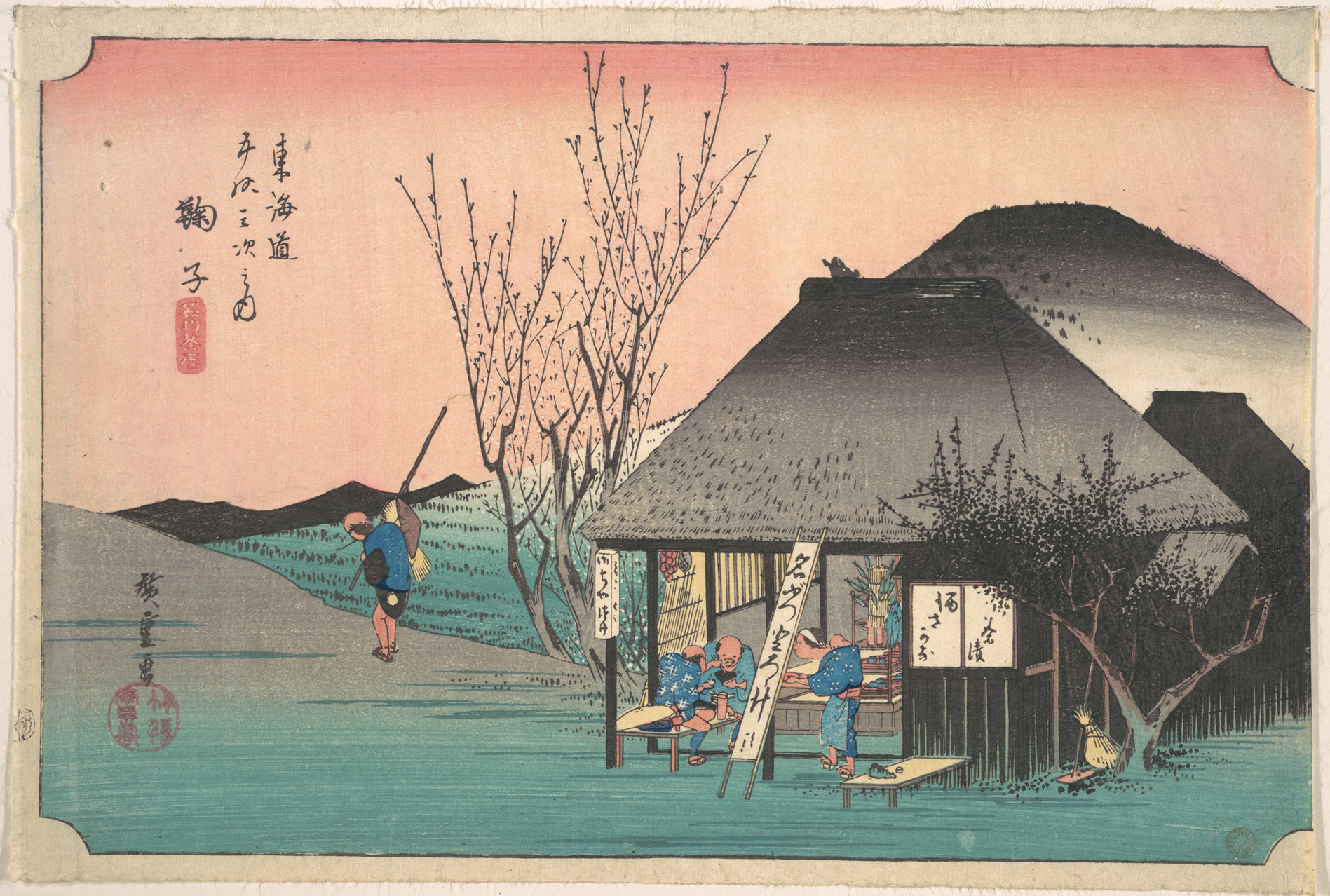
Mariko, the 20th station of the Tōkaidō, subtitled in a rectangular cartouche: "The Tea House of Famous Specialties" (Meibutsu chamise). Hiroshige's Fifty-Three Stations of the Tōkaidō series, 1833–34.

In the Edo period, the success of the tea ceremony was confirmed. Disciples of Sen no Rikyū, starting with Furuta Oribe who succeeded him, placed themselves at the service of the Tokugawa shoguns and their provincial governors from the warrior group, the daimyos, who made them their tea masters and granted them fiefs in exchange for their services. They developed their own style, known as daimyō-cha, which reached its apogee at the end of the seventeenth century. Sen no Rikyū's descendants, in turn, preserved a simpler style, following in their forefather's footsteps. His grandson Sen no Sōtan attracted many disciples, but after his retirement in 1648, three of his sons each founded their own school: Omotesenke, Urasenke and Mushakōjisenke. They became increasingly formalist, emphasizing above all the gestural preparation of tea (点前, temae), and split into other branches in the 19th century, each developing increasingly codified esoteric traditions. The financial setbacks of many daimyos during this period deprived them of the financial support they had previously enjoyed, and the tea ceremony was taken up by non-warrior categories who had become very wealthy and were attracted by the formal aspect of this art, its refinement, which enabled them to acquire the culture of the traditional elites and thus contributed to their social affirmation, by raising their cultural capital. Books explaining the art of tea were printed to accompany this popularization. The way to tea was also opened up to women, who until then had been practically excluded from this practice, which had been the prerogative of the men of Japanese high society. Elite women also found it a way of asserting their social status by raising their level of refinement, in a society marked by patriarchal principles (which explains why these women were generally present at ceremonies as companions to a male member of their family), and more broadly, the practice of this art and its codified gestures by women was seen as a means of perfecting their morals and making them more graceful.

While the elites who took part in the tea ceremony tasted high-quality powdered tea, the equivalent of today's matcha, the rest of society consumed lower-quality tea bricks, which had to be ground and boiled, as well as loose tea leaves and green tea, often imported from China. According to the description left by the German Engelbert Kaempfer, who lived in Japan at the end of the 17th century, green tea is made locally using the Chinese method of dry cooking in a wok. The basic form is then called bancha (which, to bring it closer to contemporary teas, is the equivalent of kamairicha), but better quality teas are also available.

A new method of tea making, the sencha, was developed. Coined by a tea grower from Uji, Nagatani Sōen (1681–1778), it has the particularity of interrupting oxidation by steam before rolling the leaves. These are simply consumed by tossing them into boiling water. This tea and this method of consumption were promoted by the Zen monk Baisaō (1675–1763), who cultivated an ideal of frugality since he left his customers free to choose how much they paid for it, and was highly reputed thanks to the tasty quality of his teas, since he emphasized primarily this aspect of tea consumption, as opposed to the way of the tea ceremony, which insisted on gestures and setting. He destroyed his utensils at the end of his life so that they would not be the object of veneration, but his successor Kimura Kenkadō left a description of them and laid the foundations for the codification of sencha art.

Sencha went on to become by far the most widely consumed daily tea in Japan, while matcha was gradually confined to the tea ceremony. As far as tea varieties are concerned, Uji is still favored by tea masters and the powerful. The first annual harvest, considered the best, is offered to emperors and shoguns, and solemnly transported in a sumptuous procession, further enhancing its prestige. It was exported to the Ryūkyū Islands, and to Europe on the ships of the Dutch East India Company, the only European merchants authorized to trade with the archipelago. By the early 19th century, tea-growing and processing methods had become highly sophisticated; around 1835, gyokuro emerged as one of the most famous teas. The national tea trade was controlled by guilds of merchants and wholesalers who held a monopoly on the product.

Tea was consumed in the many tea houses (茶店 / 茶屋, chamise / chaya) that were built in towns and villages and along the roads. Some became establishments providing various types of entertainment: sumojaya specialized in sumo fights, shibaijaya in theatrical performances; in pleasure districts, mijuzaya where male customers were served tea and sake by young women, and hikitejaya which acted as brothels.

=== Meiji Era ===
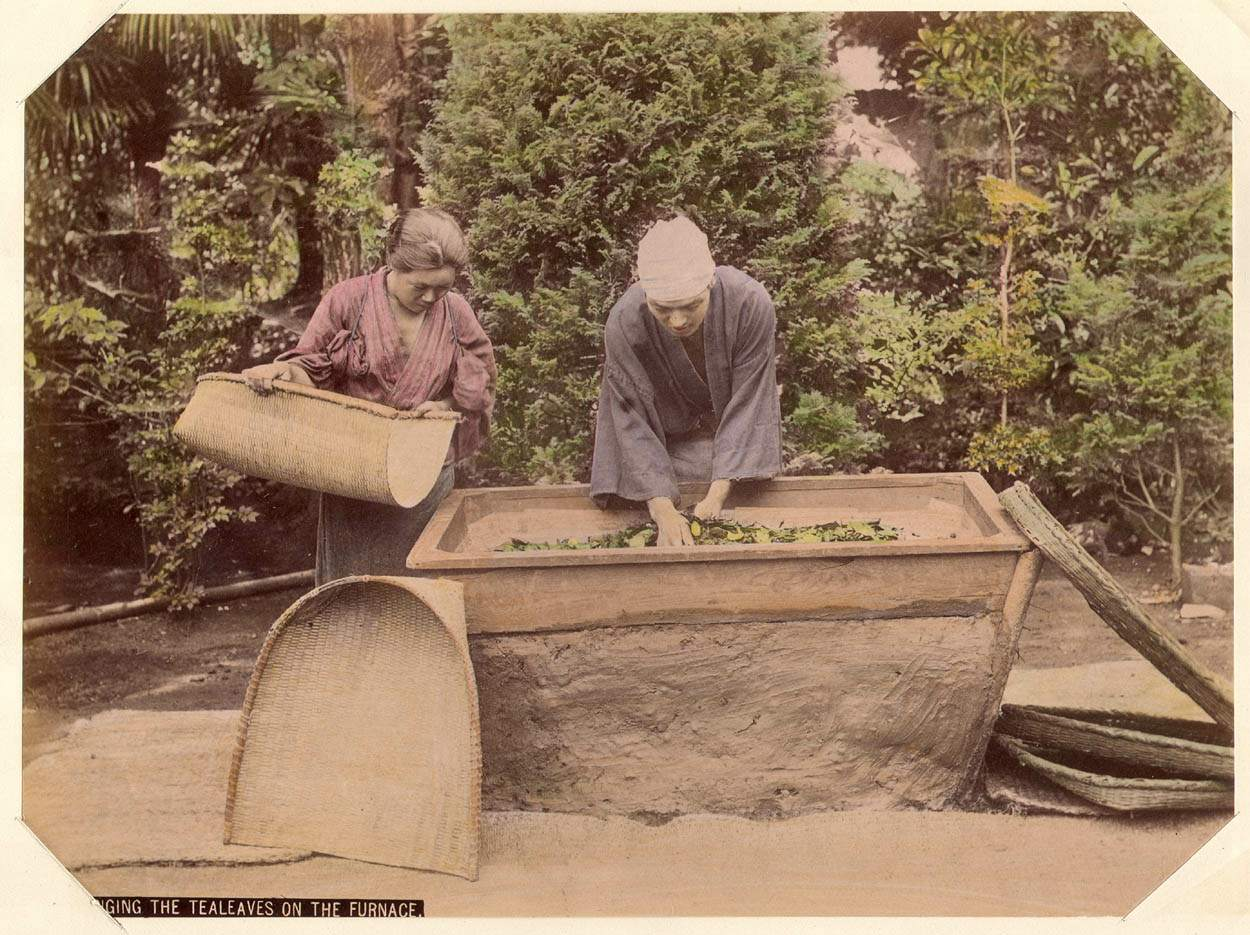
Withering tea leaves on the stove, photograph by Kusakabe Kimbei (1841–1934)

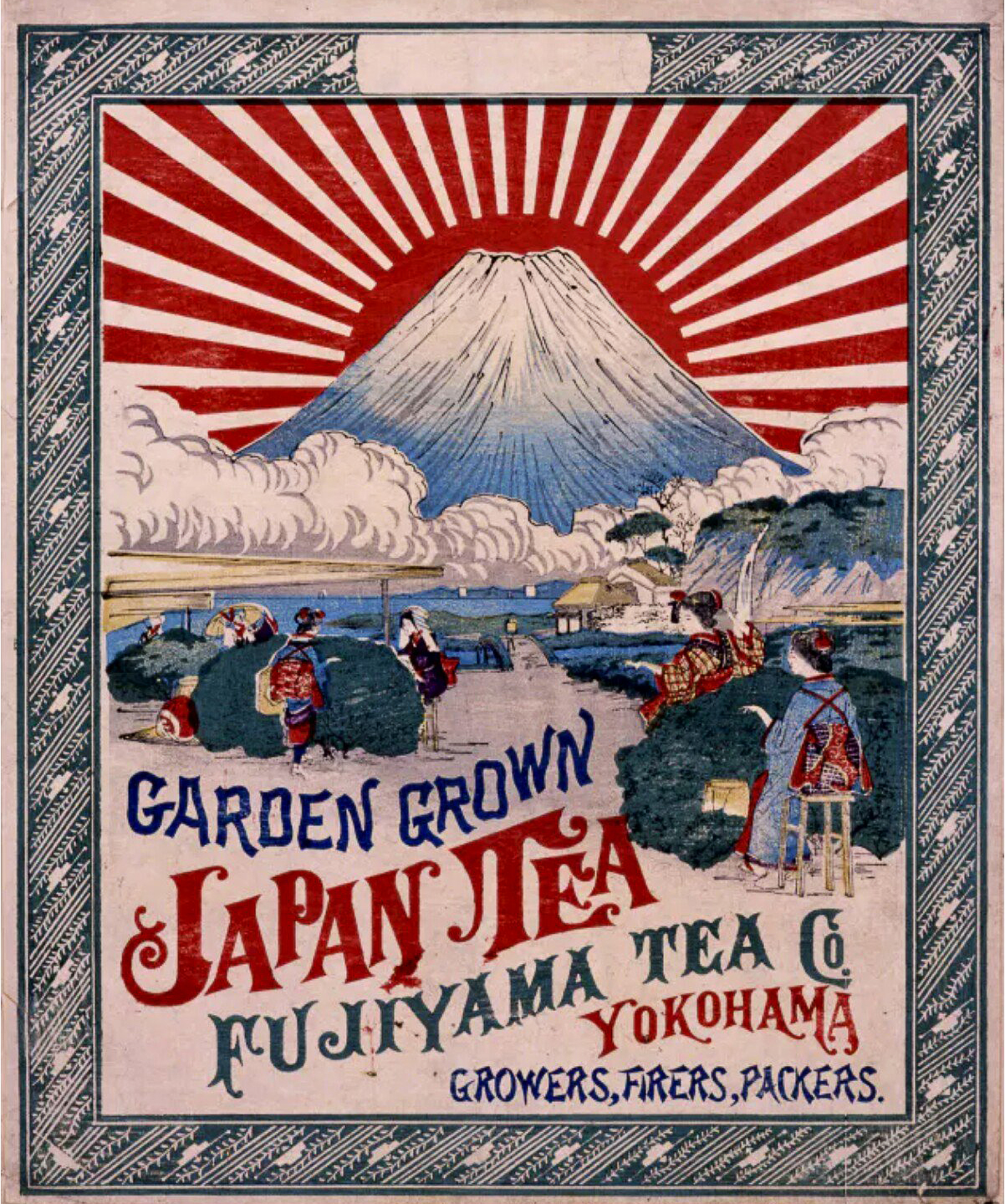
Japanese tea label for export

Japan was forced to open up to the West after 1853, and began modernizing in the final years of the Edo period, which saw the fall of the shogunate, followed by the Meiji era (1868–1912). By the late 1850s, the archipelago had become a major tea exporter, a trend that continued thereafter. It sold mainly to the United States, where Japanese sencha enjoyed great success, although it seems that teas destined for foreign markets were often of poor quality. The government encouraged tea production, and many former samurai invested in the industry. After the conquest of the island of Formosa (Taiwan) in 1895, the Japanese developed tea plantations there, in particular to produce British-style black tea for overseas markets.

The art of the tea ceremony underwent major changes during the Meiji era. Initially rather neglected, as it was perceived to be archaic and obsolete, it attracted the new economic elites (the future leaders of the conglomerates called zaibatsu in the following era) who became important patrons of the tea masters, and used tea ceremonies to maintain and expand their networks. These meetings were also open to foreign emissaries. The art of tea thus gradually regained its letters of nobility, and with the assertion of national sentiment after the military successes at the turn of the 20th century, it was seen as one of the traditional arts proper to Japan and was increasingly valued from a nationalist perspective. At the same time, the way of tea became much more open to women than in the past, as it was seen as a necessary part of the personal culture of a good Japanese housewife and mother. The way of tea was also popularized abroad, thanks to the publication of works taking advantage of the craze for Japonisme, such as O culto da chá ("The Cult of Tea", 1905) by the Portuguese Wenceslau de Moraes and, above all, "The Book of Tea", 1906) published in English by the Japanese Okakura Kakuzō, aimed at a Western audience.

== Tea production in Japan ==
=== General performance ===
Tea production in Japan (in thousands of tons) and cultivated area (in thousands of hectares), 2002–2016.

| Year | 2002 | 2003 | 2004 | 2005 | 2006 | 2007 | 2008 | 2009 | 2010 | 2011 | 2012 | 2013 | 2014 | 2015 | 2016 |
|---|---|---|---|---|---|---|---|---|---|---|---|---|---|---|---|
| Production | 84 | 92 | 101 | 100 | 92 | 94 | 96 | 86 | 85 | 84 | 88 | 85 | 84 | 80 | 80 |
| Cultivated area | 50 | 50 | 49 | 49 | 49 | 48 | 48 | 47 | 47 | 46 | 46 | 45 | 45 | 44 | 43 |

Tea production in Japan was around 90,000 tonnes a year in the early 1990s, before peaking in 2004 and 2005 at 100,000 tonnes. Since then, production has been declining slowly, to around 80,000 tonnes a year, due to falling domestic demand for green tea, the main outlet for Japanese production. This trend has also been accompanied by a reduction in the area under cultivation (from around 58,000 hectares in the early 1990s to around 43,000 in 2016) and, at a faster pace, in the number of tea farms (from 53,687 in 2000 to 19,603 in 2015), resulting in an increase in their average size. According to these statistics, Japan is not a major tea producer on a global scale, nor is tea a major product of Japanese agriculture. However, these figures do not reflect its cultural or social importance in Japan.

=== Tea bush cultivation ===
Tea cultivation in Japan has long embraced modernization and productivism, with mechanization along with earlier use of genetics compared to other producing countries, as the country's level of income and technology is higher than in other countries. The bulk of plantations is concentrated in a few prefectures in Honshū and Kyūshū, which is overwhelmingly populated by a hybrid developed in the country, Yabukita, and harvested mechanically. Hand-picking is still used, to ensure better-quality tea, as well as the use of shading on plantations, which is a Japanese specialty.

==== Geography ====
Prefectures with the largest areas planted with tea bushes

Tea is grown in Japan between Akita in the north (latitude 40°N) and Okinawa in the south (26°N). Despite the harsher climate, tea plants have been grown further north in the past, including on the island of Hokkaidō. The main tea leaf-growing region is Shizuoka Prefecture, which accounts for around 40% of the national area cultivated with tea bushes, mainly sencha. The second largest producer is Kagoshima, on Kyūshū, with around 20%, and the other prefectures on this island are also major producers. Then comes Mie with around 7%. Kyōto prefecture accounts for only around 3.5% of the national tea-growing area, but Uji tea remains the most prestigious denomination, whether for sencha, matcha, or gyokuro. The main tea-growing regions are located in monsoon climates, with hot, humid summers and cold, dry winters. Shizuoka has an average annual temperature of 16.3 °C, which is typical for tea-growing regions, but it is one of the most northerly in the world and regularly experiences frost in winter. Heading southwest, the climate warms up: in Kagoshima, the average annual temperature is 18.4 °C, and the growing season is longer. The inland terroir of Uji benefits from protection from oceanic weather, colder winters, and hotter summers, and the hills where the tea bushes grow also benefit from high humidity (dew and mist) due to the proximity of Lake Biwa and streams, factors considered to be responsible for the better quality of its teas.

==== Cultivars ====
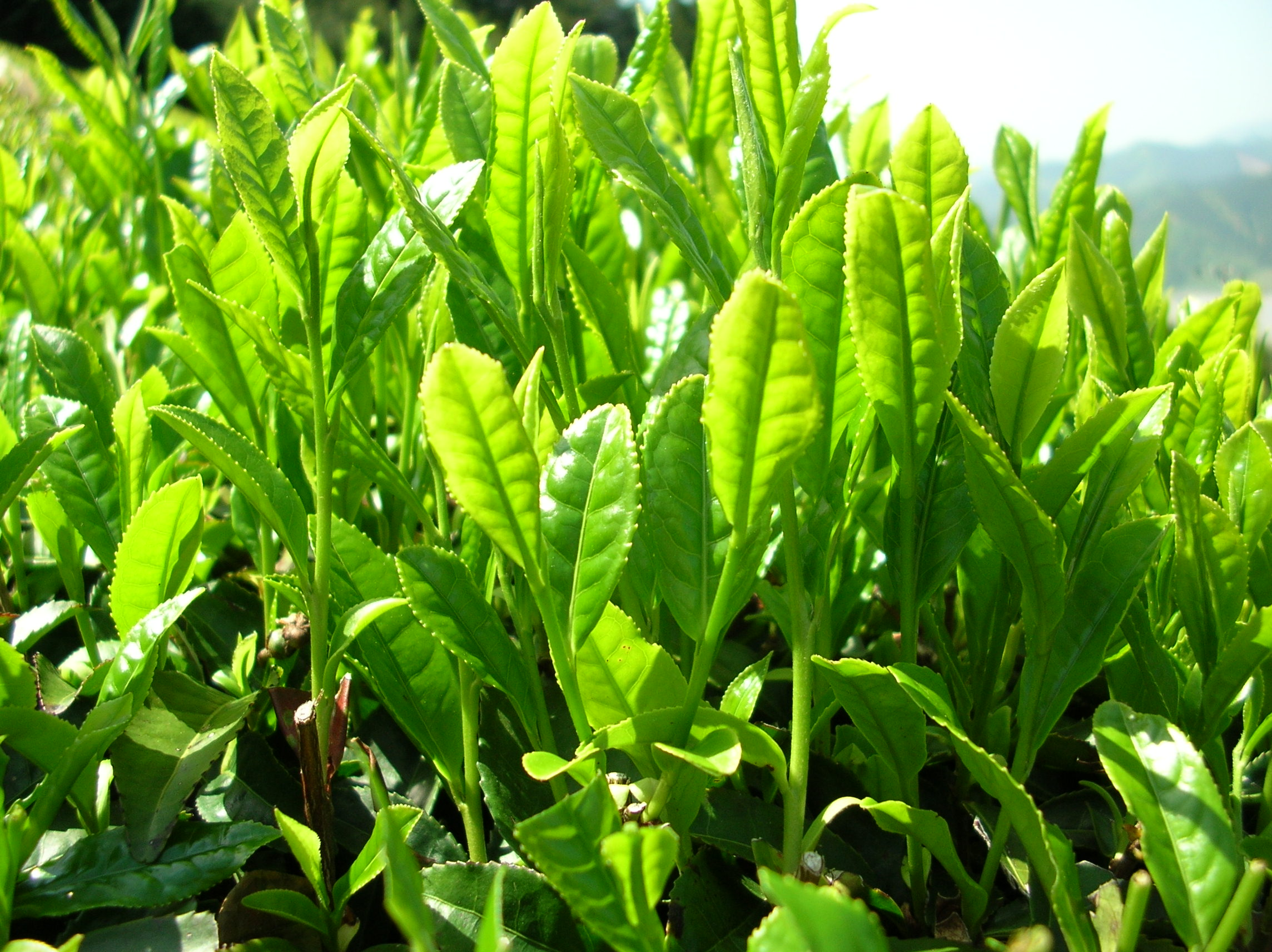
Leaves of a Yabukita tea bush

Tea plants grown in Japan are derived from the "Chinese" variety (Camellia sinensis var. sinensis). The main tea cultivar planted in Japan is Yabukita, a hybrid developed by Hikosaburo Sugiyama (1857–1941) in Shizuoka and patented in the early 1950s, which is characterized by high resistance, good leaf quality, and high yields. Since the 1970s, it has spread to all tea-growing areas, accounting for 80 to 85% of national production in the 1990s. Today, this percentage has fallen to around 75% (especially for sencha), with cuttings accounting for 90%, leaving only a small proportion of tea planted from seed. This is a potentially dangerous situation, since Yabukita is particularly vulnerable to pests and diseases, and an epidemic could cause widespread devastation. The main cultivars used to produce matcha are Asahi and Samidori. Research into the production of new varieties is still very active, focusing in particular on cultivars that are even more resistant to disease and pests, used in particular to compensate for the reduced use of pesticides in organic farming.

==== Tea bush protection and soil fertilization ====
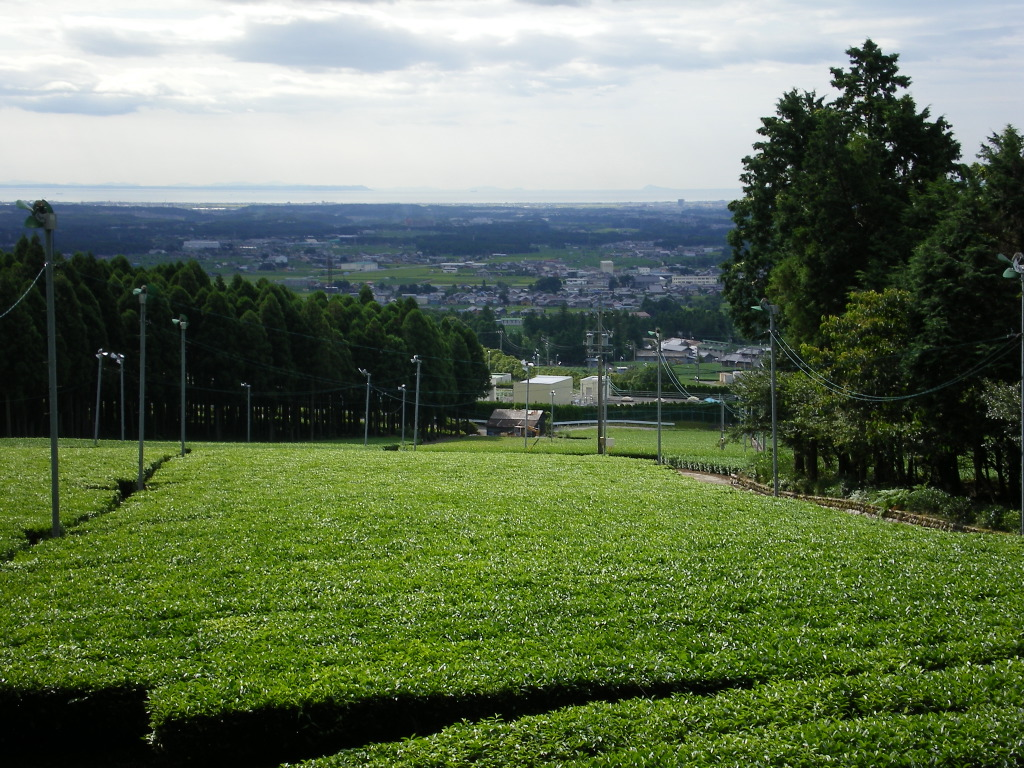
Frost protection fans above a plantation in Yokkaichi, Mie Prefecture

Tea bushes can be protected from the weather, primarily frost and hail, by placing tarpaulins and small fans above the plantations, which move the air towards the tea bushes on the ground to prevent the cold air from accumulating and the trees from freezing, particularly in spring when the buds begin to open. This is one of the defining features of the Japanese tea-growing landscape.

Tea plant cultivation is also confronted with insect pests, such as mulberry mealybug (Pseudaulacaspis pentagona) or tea aphid (Toxoptera aurantii), and diseases such as anthracnose, against which pesticides and other chemical treatments are used, up to ten times a year in some plantations. This massive use raises environmental and health issues, and is subject to controls and regulations. Japanese teas, for example, have been found to contain high levels of pesticide residues, often exceeding the maximum residue limits set by other countries, which is a barrier to their export (notably to the European Union).

Chemical fertilizers (made up of nitrogen, potassium or phosphorus) are used to accelerate plant growth; they are applied several times a year between the two or three tea leaf harvest periods. Overuse of nitrogen fertilizers causes environmental problems in tea-growing areas such as Shizuoka Prefecture, leading to soil acidification and contamination of water resources.

==== Shading ====
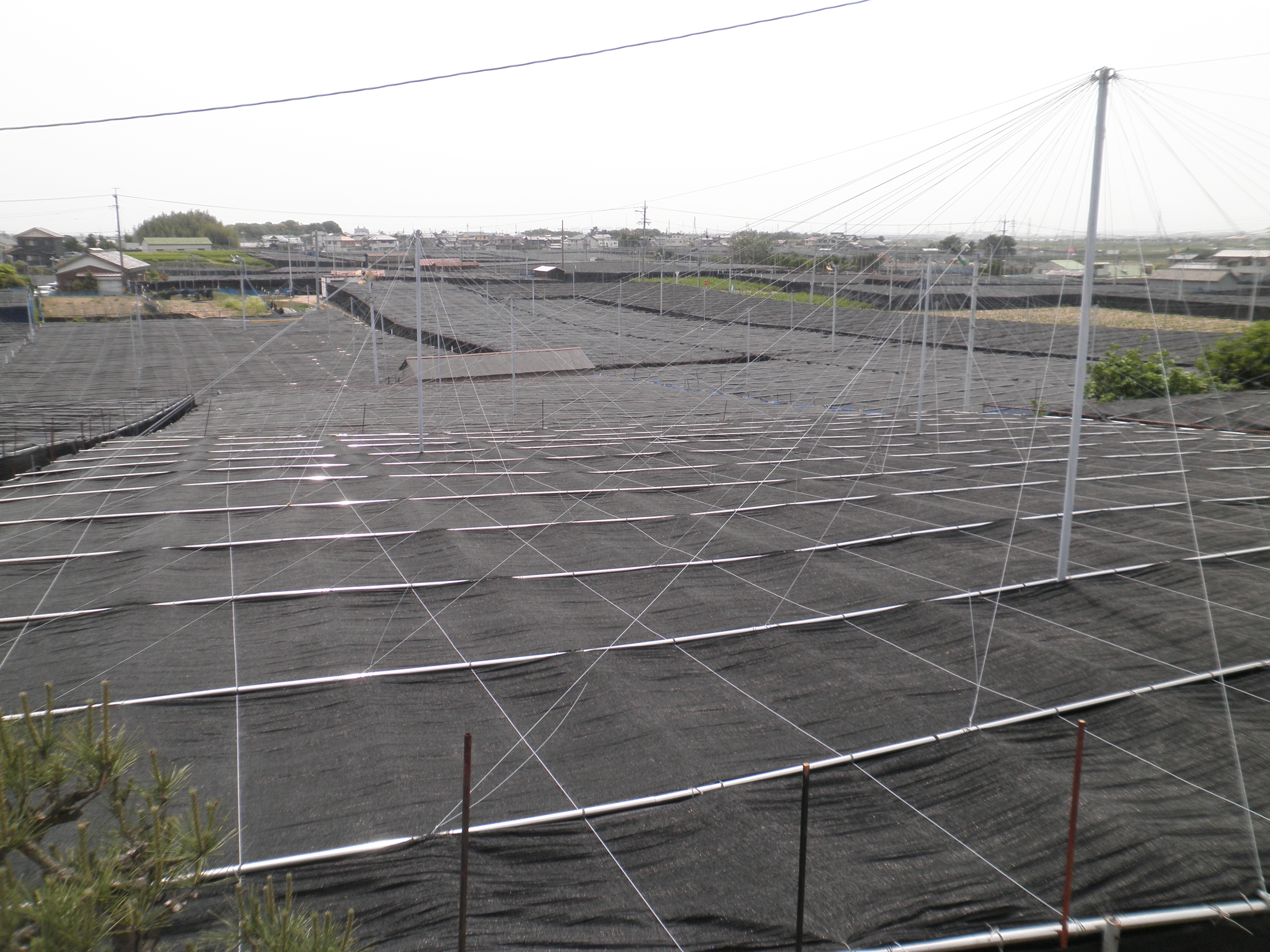
Plantation shades in Nishio, Aichi Prefecture (for matcha production)

Since the 16th century, there is documented evidence of the practice of laying rice straw mats over tea plantations in Uji to protect them from the volcanic ash spewed by Mount Fuji. João Rodrigues points out that this also protects the bushes from cold and hail. It was later found that this shading altered the taste of the teas, resulting in a beverage deemed to be of better quality, and the practice spread to other terroirs, being used to make renowned varieties of matcha, gyokuro and kabusecha. The traditional form of these shades consisted of trellises of reeds or rice straw resting on bamboo structures erected over the plantations, and nowadays coverings are made of artificial cloth. It was also found that there were different effects depending on shade density, and if this was varied during the ripening period of the plants. In particular, modern analyses have revealed that this evolution in taste is due to the fact that, with less exposure to the sun, the theanine and caffeine content of the leaves is higher, while the catechin content is lower, which limits the diffusion of bitter and astringent flavours and makes it possible to obtain more umami.

==== Harvest calendar ====
Plucking or harvesting is the most labor-intensive part of tea-growing. The timing of the harvest greatly determines the quality of the tea, since buds and leaves harvested in early spring are considered to be of better quality (in terms of taste and health) than those of subsequent harvests, since leaves grown during the warmer seasons are less tender. The harvesting process begins in late April and ends in early October. The very first harvest of the year is called shincha (新茶, "new tea"), an appellation for sought-after teas. It is also part of the first harvest cycle, which produces ichibancha (一番茶, "first tea"), which runs roughly from the end of April to May, starting in mid-April in Kagoshima in the south, and in the first fortnight of May in Shizuoka in the north, with a time lag of a fortnight between the two. This is the season for the best and most expensive harvests (gyokuro, tencha, kabusecha and the best-quality sencha). Then come three harvest phases: from June to July, the second harvest (二番茶, nibancha), then a third harvest (三番茶, sanbancha) in August and eventually the last harvest (四番茶, yonbancha) in September and October. The summer and autumn harvests are used to produce the cheaper, secondary-quality teas.

==== Harvesting methods ====
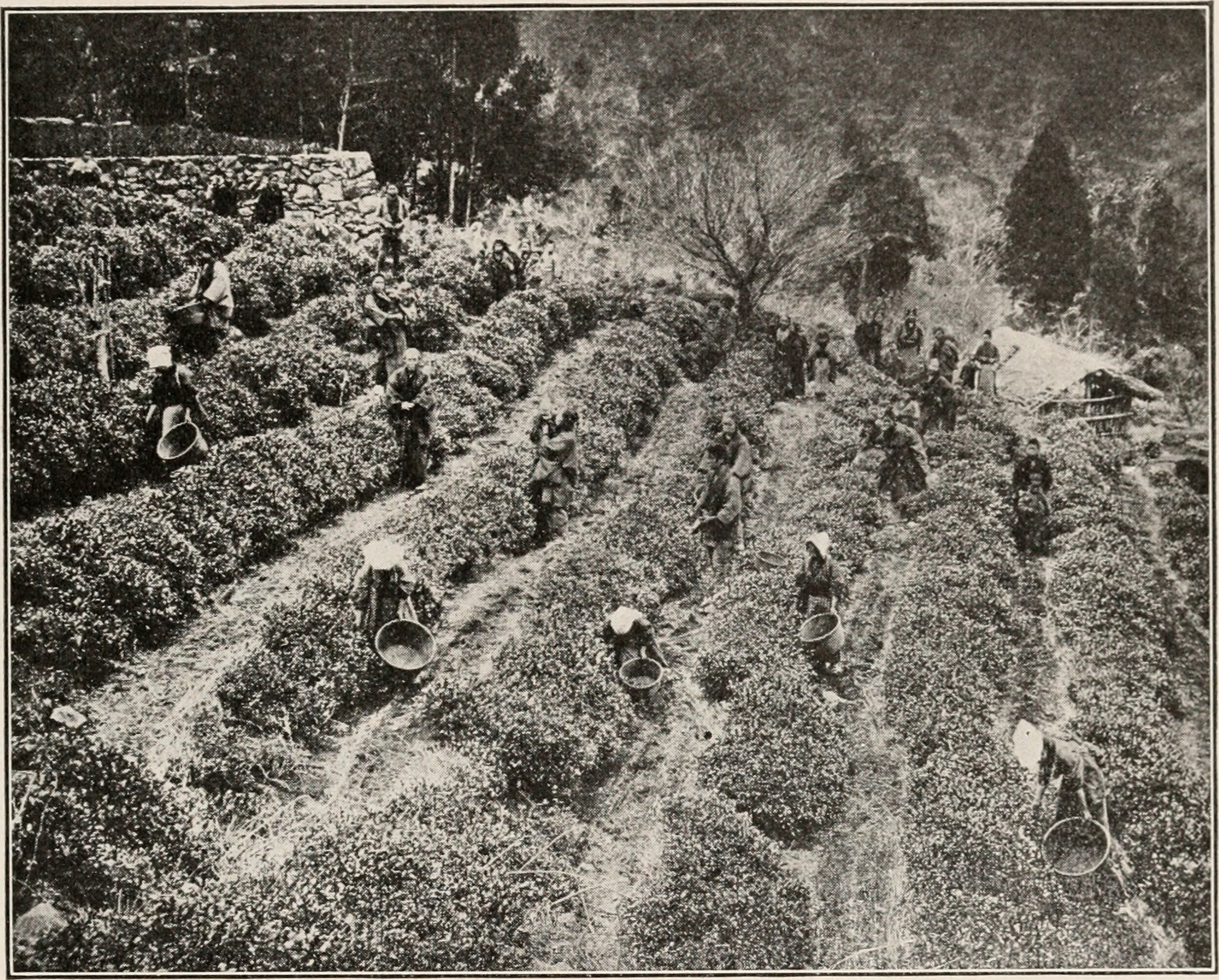
Tea harvesting in Japan, early 20th-century photograph

Japan is by far the most technologically advanced tea-growing country in the world. This phenomenon began in the early 20th century, with the development of patented large shears. It accompanied the development of lowland plantations, traditionally located on slopes, and the beginning of the era of productivism. The 1960s saw the development of the first one- or two-person plucking machines, followed shortly after by portable machines, a kind of tea leaf harvester. Subsequently, Japanese industrial companies (in particular Kawasaki and Ochiai) led the way in the development of tea leaf plucking machines, creating more diverse and powerful machines. The vast majority of Japanese tea harvesting is mechanized (around 90%), with only the best quality teas remaining hand-picked. The Japanese example is often cited in other tea-producing countries to justify the mechanization of tea production. This mechanization explains the appearance of Japanese tea fields, in which the bushes are pruned into a rounded shape and spaced at very regular intervals to facilitate the passage of machinery. The machines used to pick the tea leaves are, however, criticized for pruning without taking leaf quality into account, although selective laser-aimed machines are now available. In fact, Japan has not only the highest number of machines per hectare, but also the most advanced.

Tea plantations in Japan
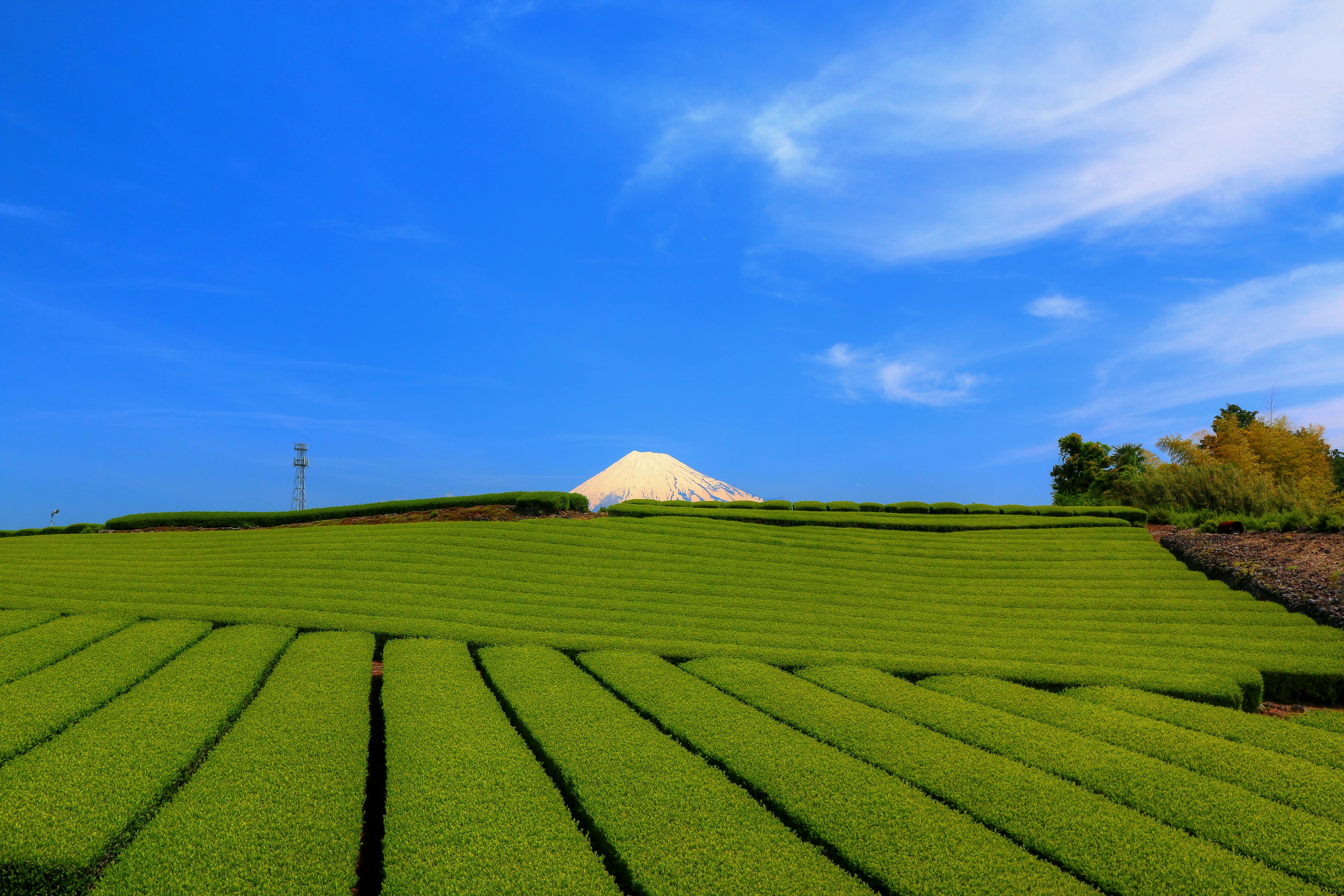
Tea plantation in Fuji, Shizuoka Prefecture

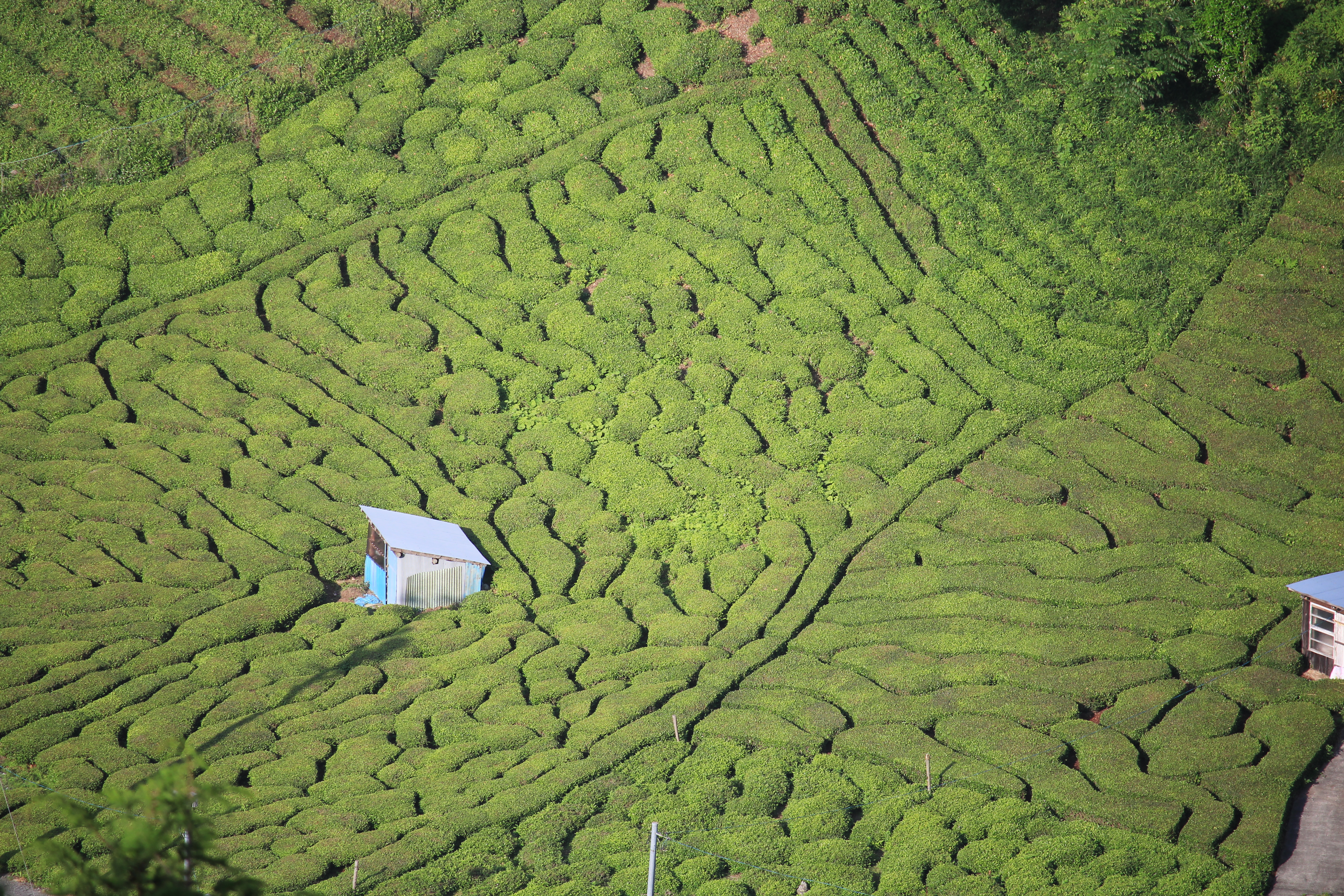
Kamigare plantation in Ibigawa, Gifu Prefecture

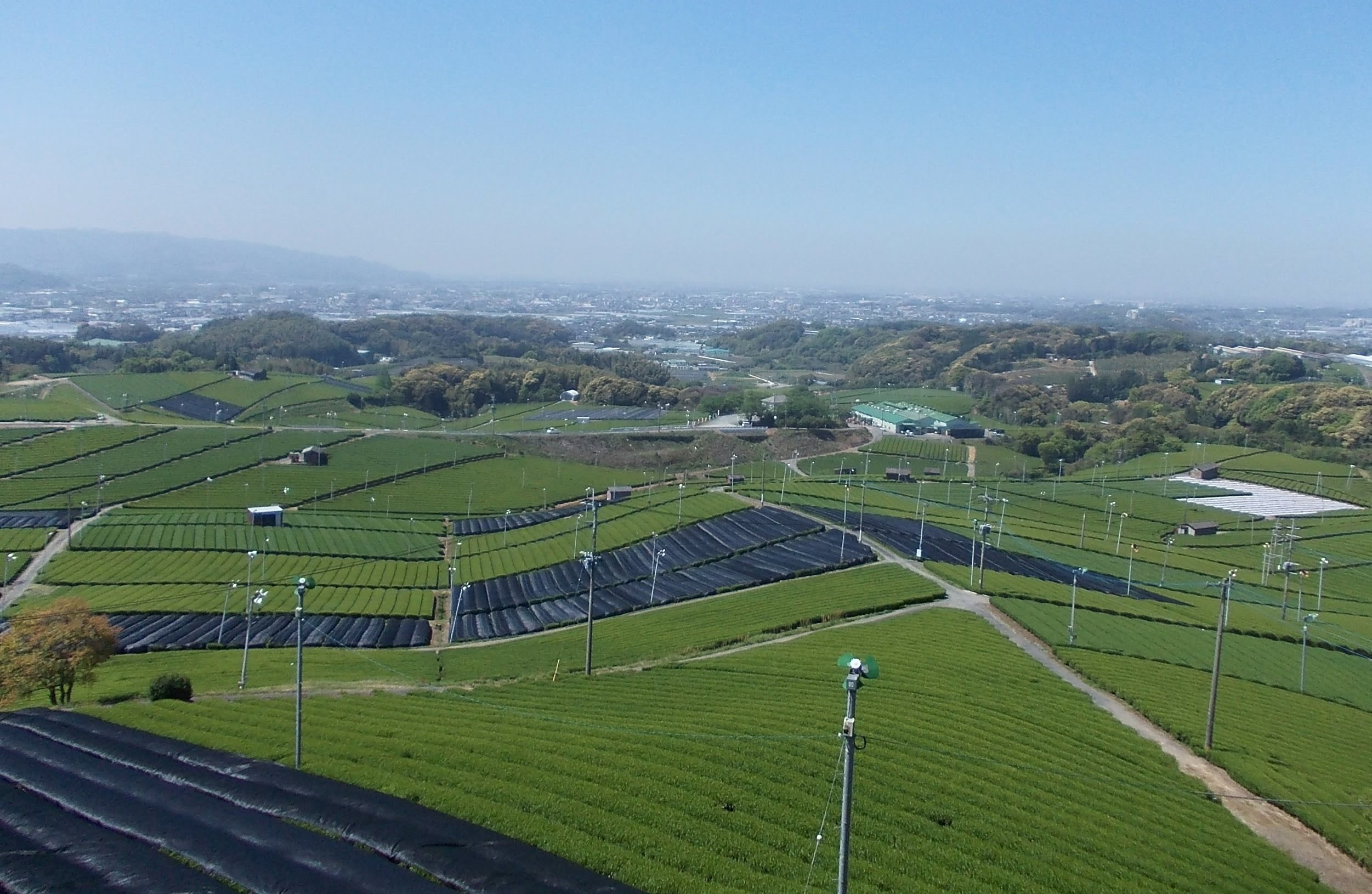
Plantations in Yame, Fukuoka Prefecture

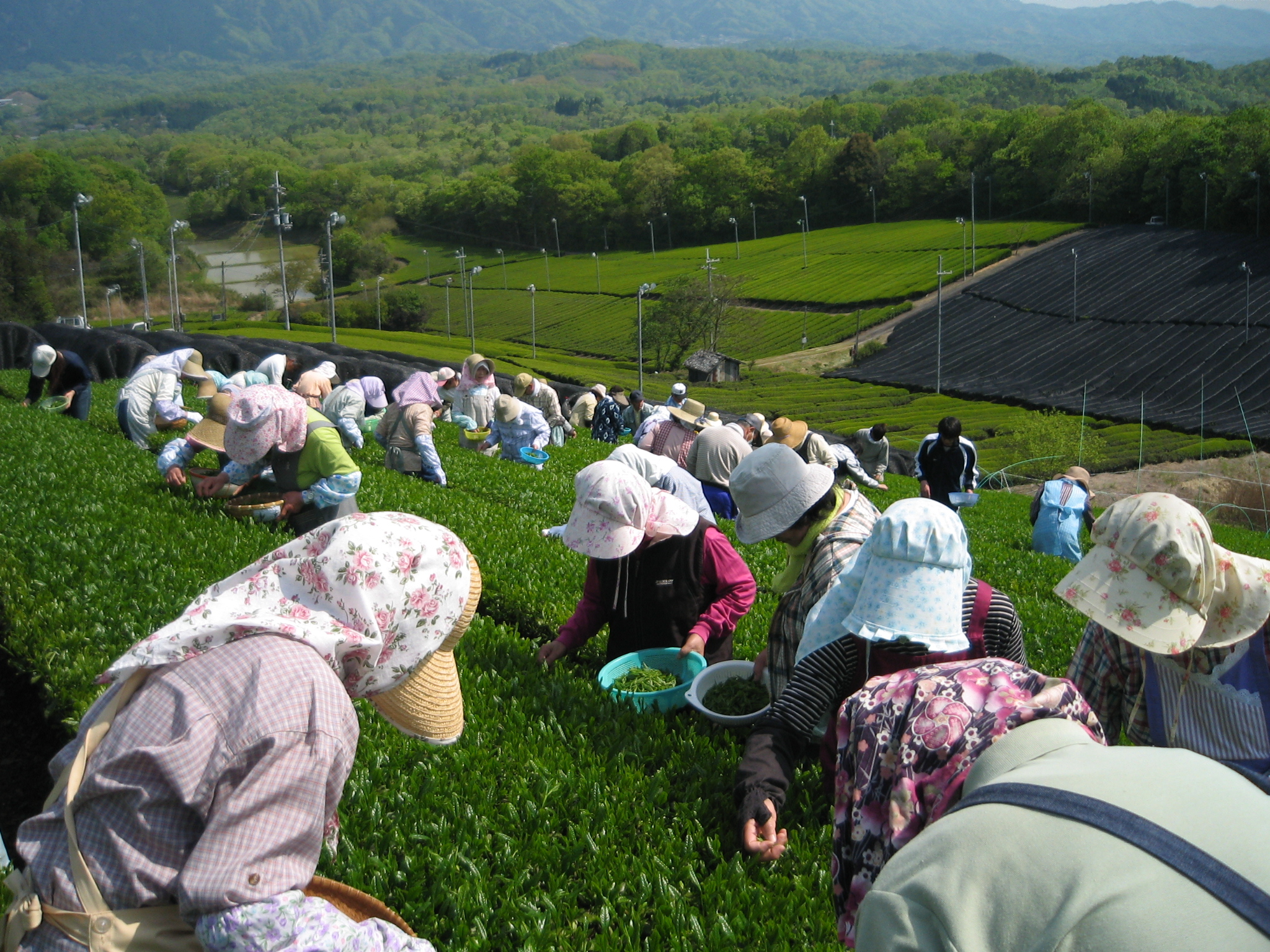
Hand-picked tea in the village of Minamiyamashiro, Kyoto Prefecture

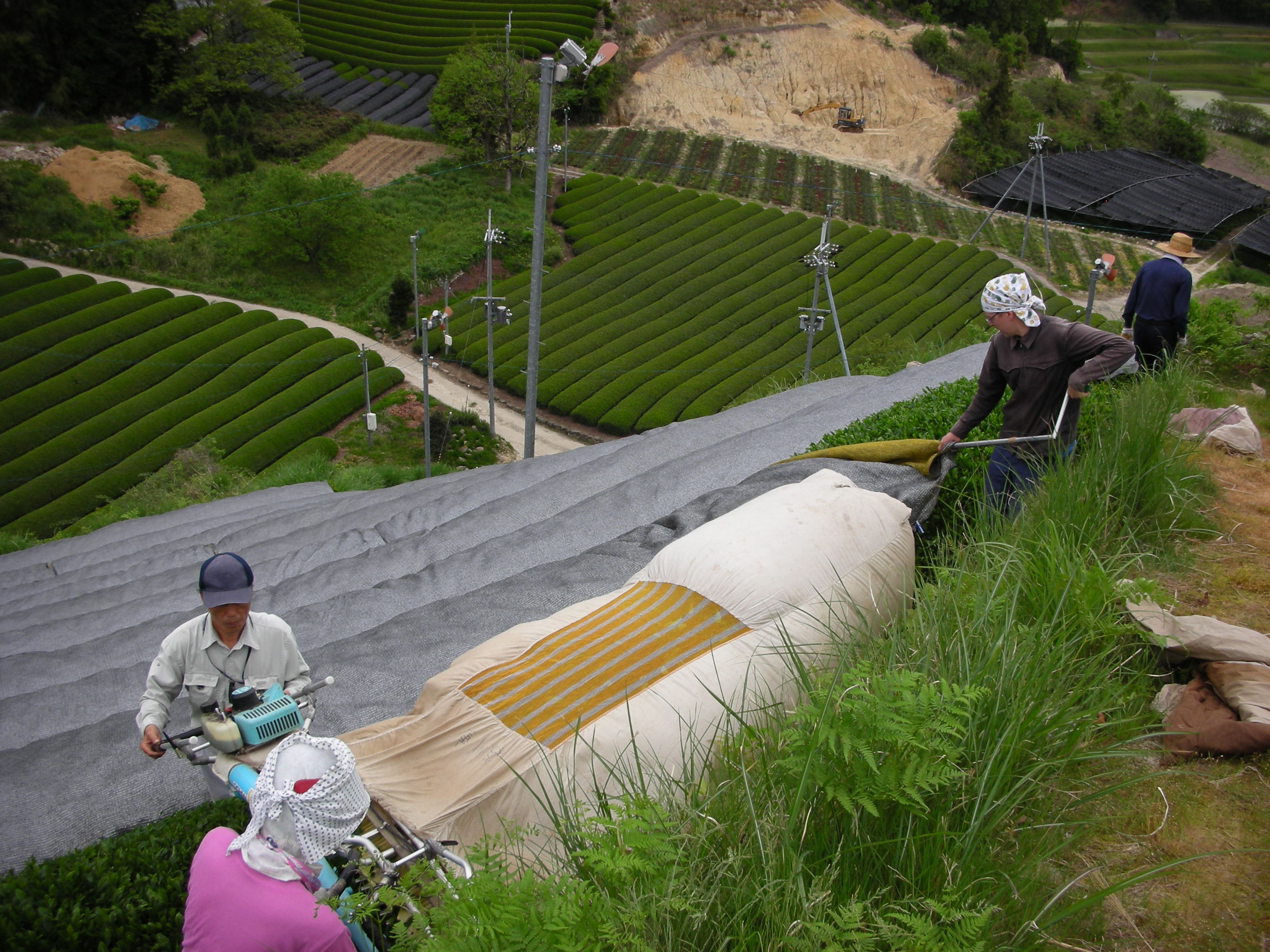
Harvesting with a portable machine (foreground) and removal of shade tarpaulins (background) on a kabusecha plantation

=== Tea types and processing ===
Production from Japanese plantations is processed locally, in mostly mechanized factories, although some quality teas are still partly processed by hand. The raw tea leaves are first processed, then refined, sometimes further processed (notably by roasting), and assembled into the product sold on the market, whether as leaves or powder in tins or bags, as well as beverages sold in cans and plastic bottles. Green tea accounts for the vast majority of Japanese production.

==== Sencha ====
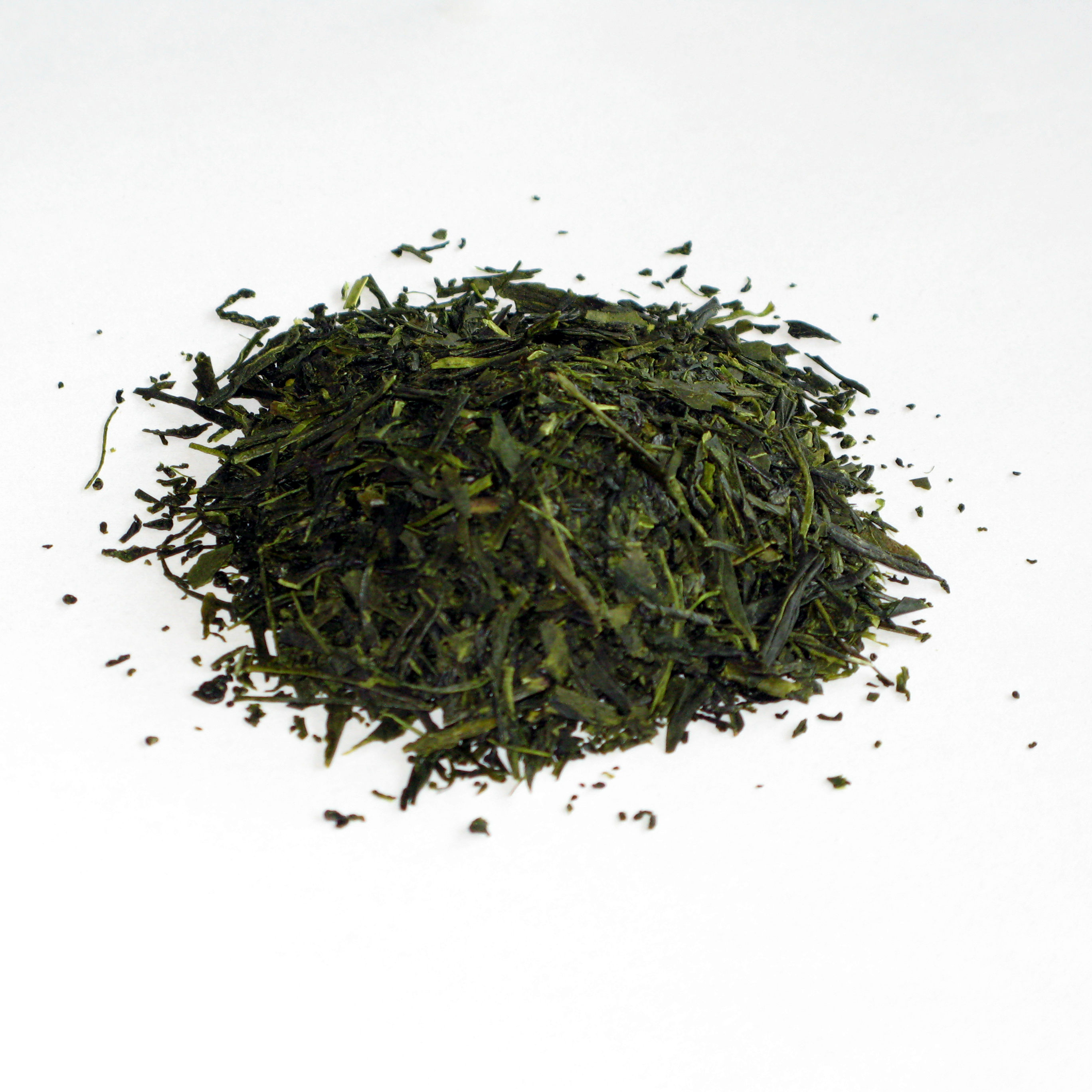
Sencha leaves

Sencha is by far the most widely produced green tea in Japan, accounting for 58% of raw tea in 2015, and is grown in all the country's tea-growing regions. The specific processing method developed in the eighteenth century involves stopping oxidation of the leaves by steaming, for varying lengths of time depending on the quality required (from 30 sec. to around 2 min. 30 sec.). The leaves are then cooled, wrung out and rolled, three times. Next, this "raw" tea (called aracha) undergoes secondary processing to obtain the finished product: the leaves are shaped, dried by heating according to traditional green tea production methods, sorted, selected and finally blended according to consumer tastes.

There are many different types of sencha, depending on their quality. This can be determined by when the leaves are harvested, with the earliest, the "new tea" (Shincha), being the most highly prized. Terroir also determines quality, with Uji being the most renowned. Finally, the processing method is also taken into account.

==== Bancha ====
Bancha is a common tea, produced from the leaves picked during the last harvests of the year, in late summer and autumn. These are mature leaves, thicker and harder, which have been exposed to the summer sun, and the later ones are plucked from the lower parts of the tea plant that have been spared by the first harvests, so are roughly trimmed and rarely whole. For all these reasons, they are considered to be of lower quality, and need to be steamed for much longer.

==== Matcha ====
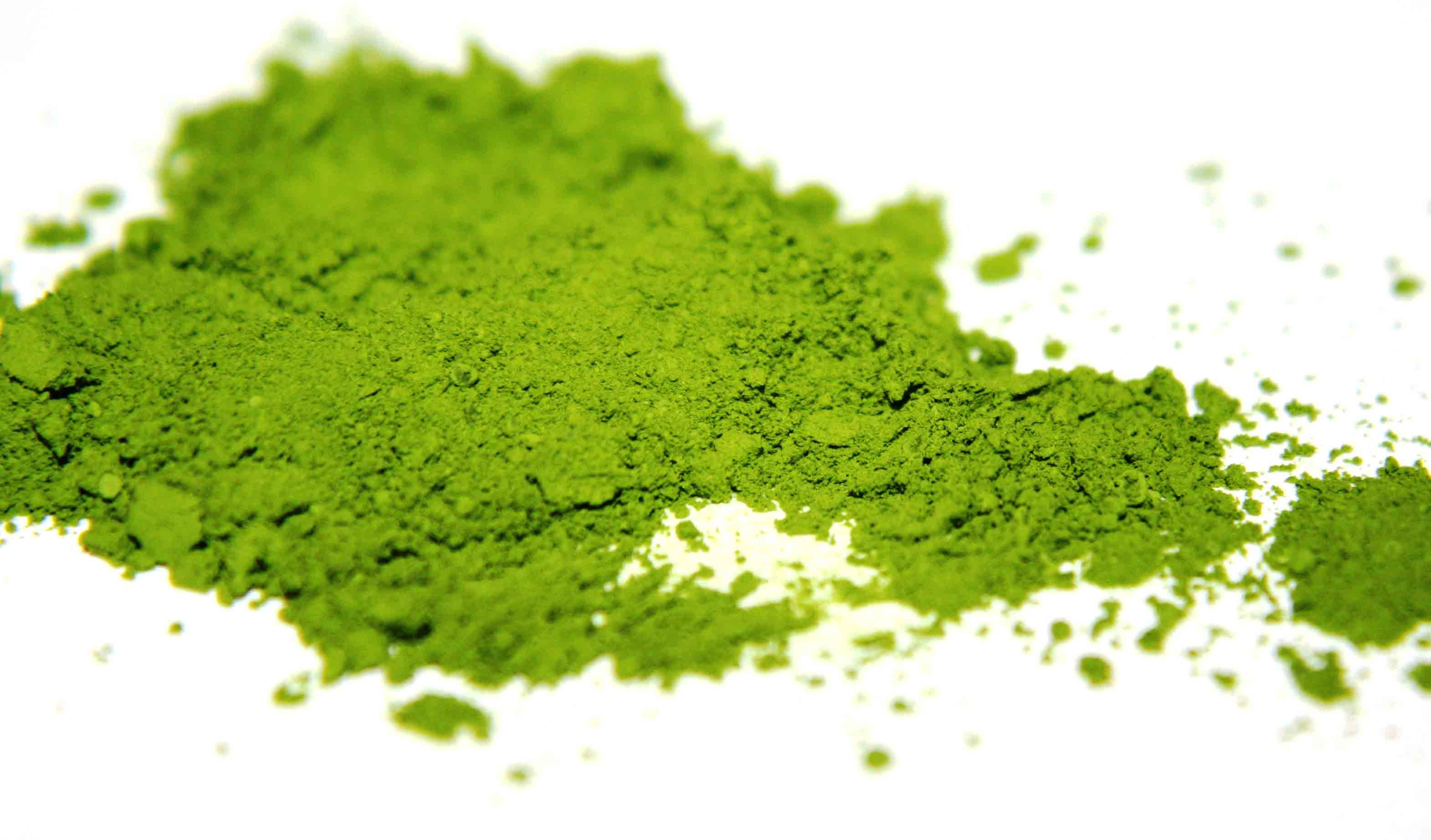
Matcha powder

Matcha is a powdered tea, processed using the oldest method employed when tea was introduced into Japan from China in the 11th century: steamed and dried tea leaves are ground to produce a fine powder. The tea leaves used to produce today's quality matcha have been grown under shade for three to four weeks, to produce the leaves known as tencha; however, other matcha of lesser quality are produced from the common raw leaves, aracha. Matcha production accounted for around 2.8% of raw tea produced in Japan in 2015, with Kyoto and Aichi being the main producing regions.

==== Gyokuro ====
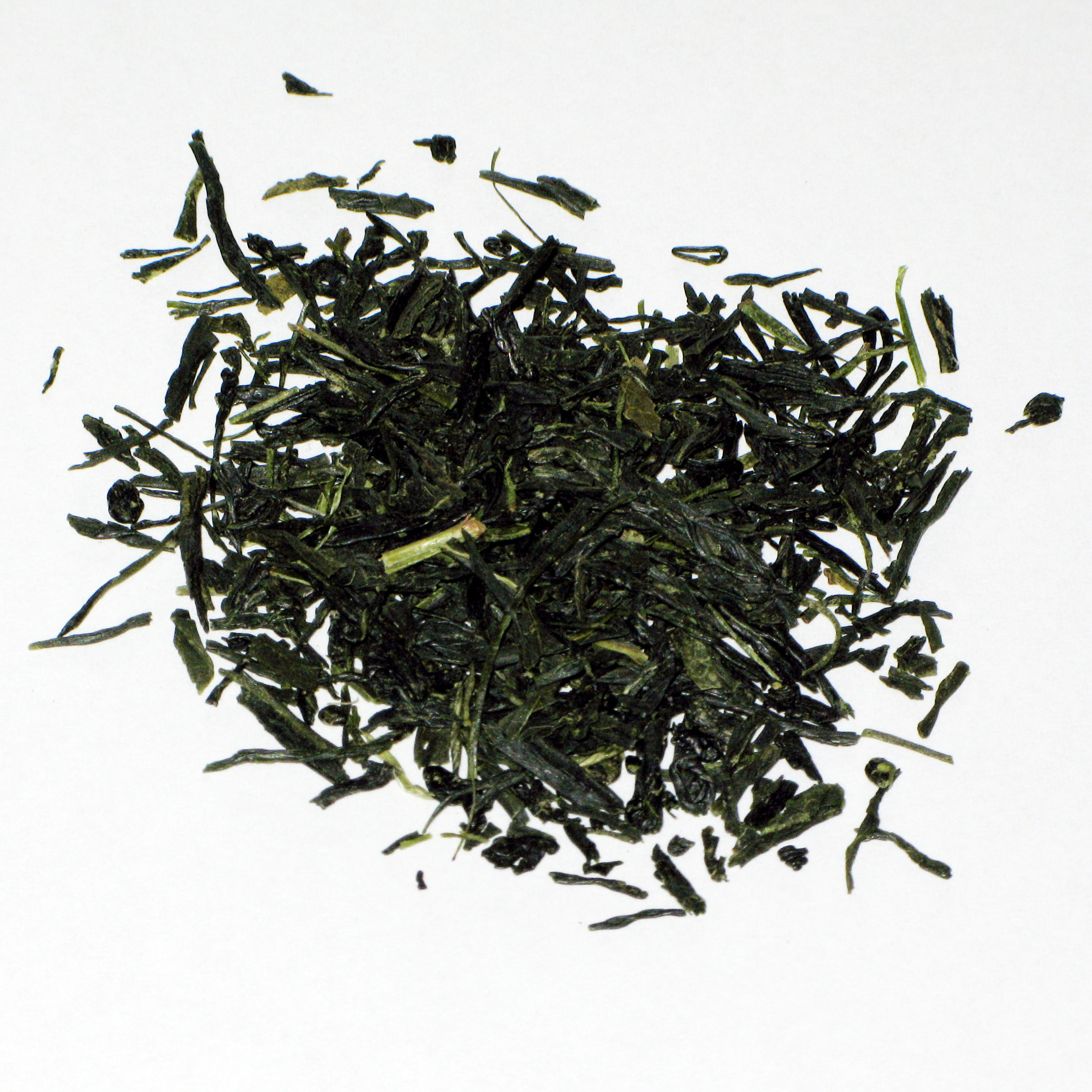
Gyokuro leaves

Gyokuro ("pearl dew") is a high-quality tea which, like the best matcha teas, is produced from tencha leaves that have been shaded during their growth (some twenty days with 55/60% sunlight occultation during the first ten days, then 95/98% during the second), and harvested in spring. After harvesting, however, they are processed in the same way as sencha, by steaming, then rolled into fine needles, by hand for the best qualities, and by machine for the majority of production. Production of gyokuro is very limited, representing 0.3% of Japanese raw tea in 2015, and it is very difficult to obtain, as it is often pre-sold. Gyokuro is produced in Kyoto (notably Uji) and Fukuoka.

==== Kabusecha ====
Kabusecha is another tea made from tencha leaves, with shading periods of one to three weeks, and blocking 45% to 80% of sunlight, a less intense process than for gyokuro. It is produced mainly in Mie and Fukuoka prefectures, and accounted for around 5.4% of Japanese raw tea in 2015.

==== Kamairicha and Tamaryokucha ====
Kamairicha is a tea produced in the prefectures of Kyūshū, following a similar method to that used in the production of Chinese green teas, consisting of roasting the tea leaves to stop their oxidation instead of steaming them. The traditional method was done in a wok or heated bowl, but higher-capacity automated cooking and rolling machines have been developed to increase the production capacity of this tea, previously produced in small quantities. In the same prefectures, tamaryokucha is produced, the special feature of which is that instead of being rolled lengthwise, the heated leaves are kneaded in several directions, resulting in a comma shape.

==== Green tea derivatives: kukicha, mecha, konacha ====
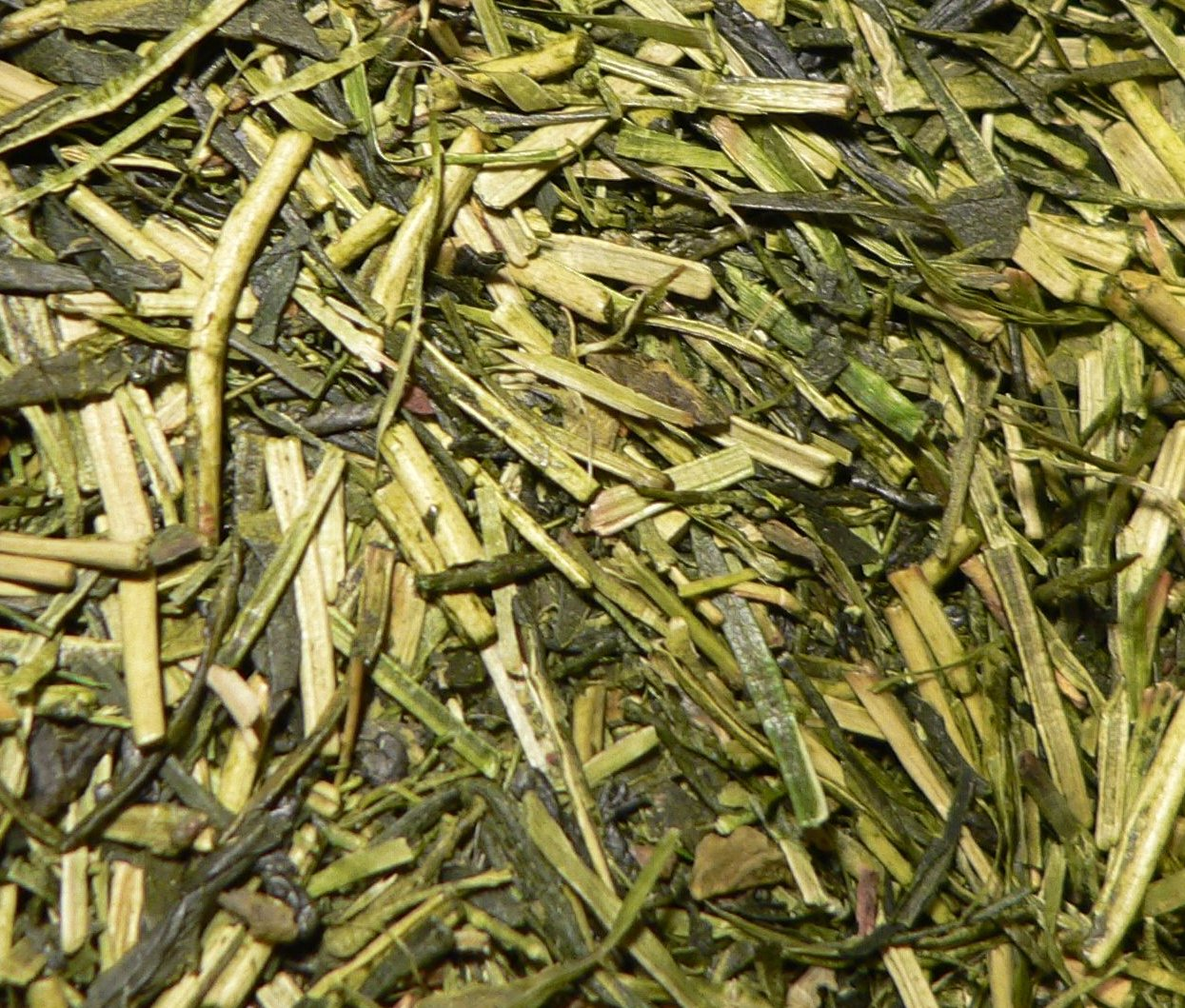
Kukicha, tea in stems

Some types of tea are derived from the by-products of green teas. Kukicha is made from stems that are separated from the leaves during the processing of quality teas. Mecha is made from tender buds and shoots left over from the sieving process; some can be of very high quality. Konacha, on the other hand, is a pulverized tea made from the powder and residues left over from sencha and gyokuro processing.

==== Roasted teas: genmaicha, hōjicha, kyōbancha ====
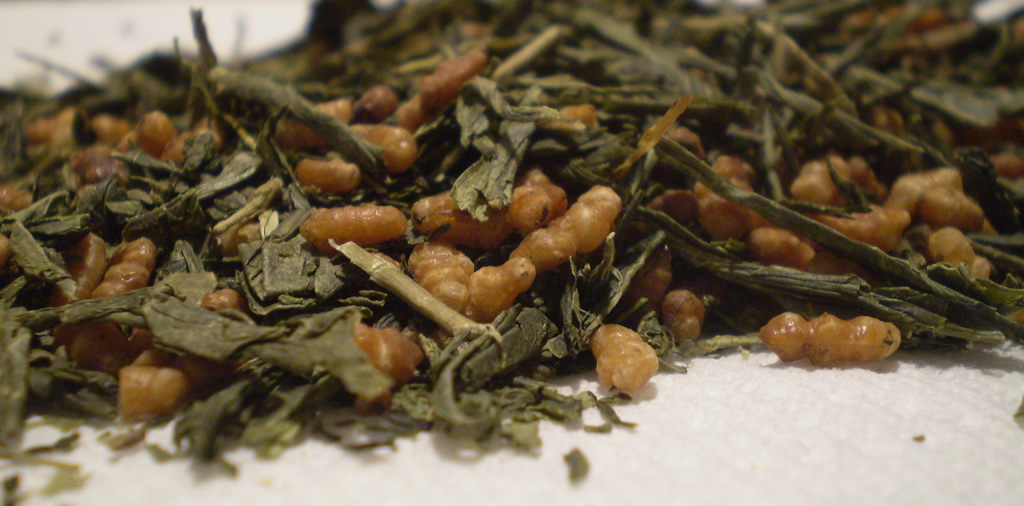
Genmaicha, tea leaves with grilled rice

Some teas are produced from green tea leaves, mainly bancha, or sencha for the best quality, undergoing a secondary transformation process by roasting. Genmaicha, "brown rice tea", was originally a drink for the poorer sections of the population, blending fried rice with green tea; nowadays it's a popular tea, the choice of good quality rice enhancing the taste of the green tea blend. Hōjicha is green tea roasted at high temperature (200 °C), in a ceramic pan called a hōroku which gives it its name. Kyōbancha is another roasted tea, originating in the Kyoto region, made from the last leaves harvested, steamed for a long time, and then dried before being roasted.

==== Black tea ====
Japanese Black tea, produced from leaves whose oxidation has been prolonged to completion, is a marginal product in Japan in the 2010s, even though it has a long history since it was first developed in the second half of the 19th century for export purposes. After peaking in the 1950s, production declined and was offset by importations, which in turn fell due to competition from coffee and black tea. Nevertheless, since the beginning of the 21st century, Japanese black tea (known as wakoucha) production has picked up again to meet renewed domestic demand (under Western influence), reaching around 200 tonnes in 2016. This is essentially quality tea, made from tea leaves similar to those used to produce green teas, and therefore of Chinese rather than Indian origin.

==== Mugicha and sobacha ====
Mugicha, "barley tea", is a beverage made from roasted barley grains, and similarly sobacha, "buckwheat tea", is made from roasted buckwheat seeds. These are infusions, not teas as such.

==== Tea beverages ====
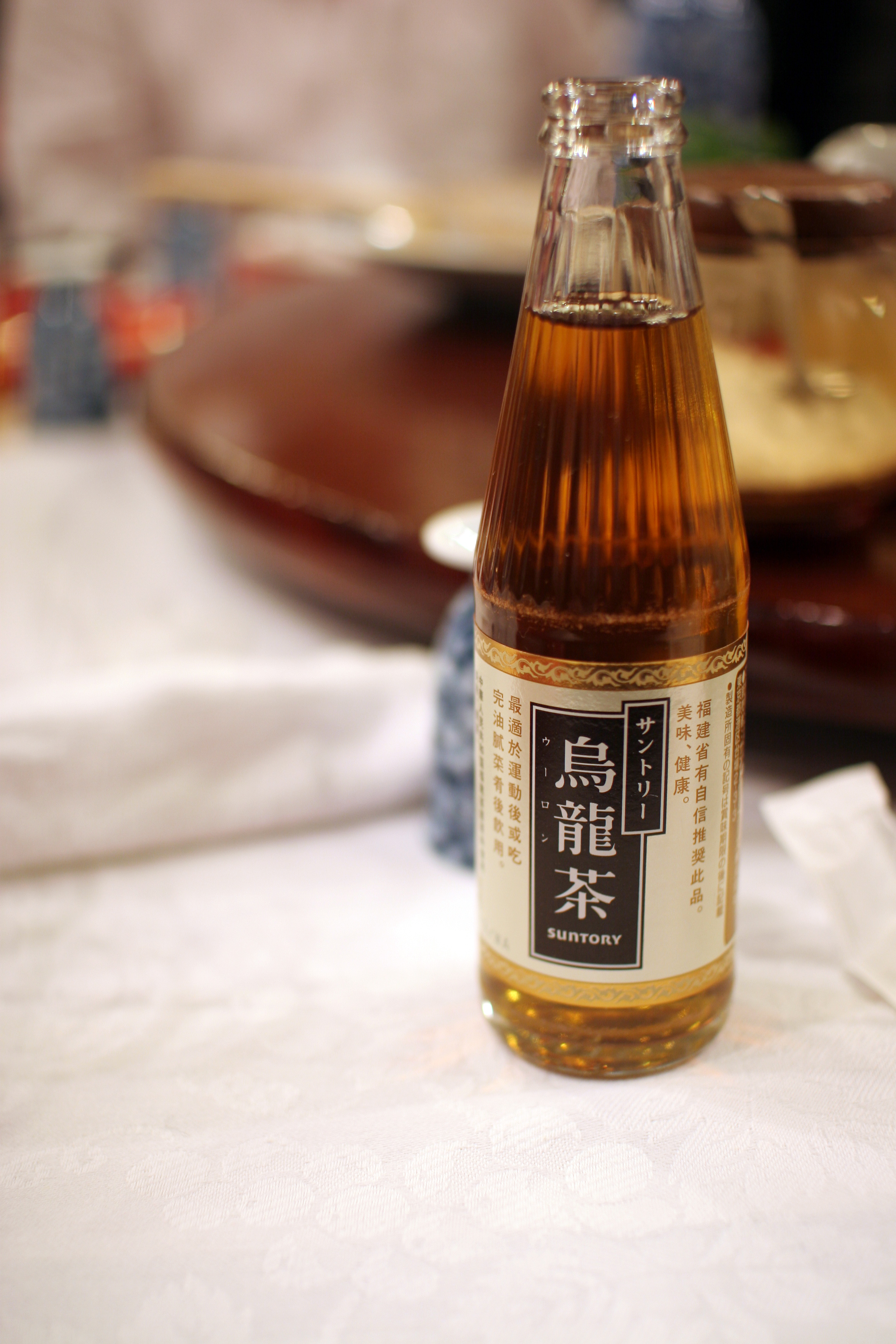
Oolong tea in a bottle, Suntory brand

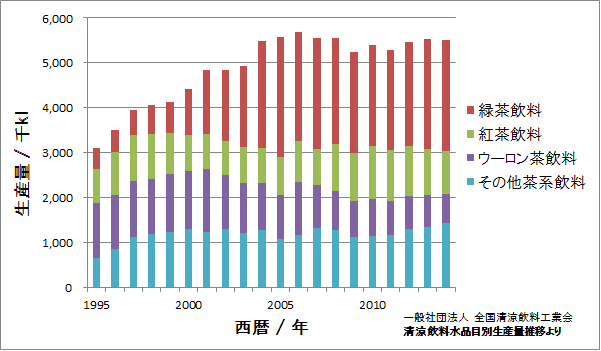
Graph showing trends in annual production of tea drinks: green tea (red), black tea (green), wulong/oolong (purple) and others (blue).

From the early 1980s onwards, tea drinks began to appear, generally consumed cold. They were first produced in cans, starting with oolong and then green tea. In the 1990s, these drinks were increasingly sold in plastic bottles. The Itō-en company was responsible for the main innovations leading to this phenomenon. Following the organization it has put in place, it buys leaves from growers, processes and assembles them, then subcontracts brewing and bottling to other companies to better adjust its production to changing demand. A growing proportion of domestic production and imports of tea leaves is now destined for tea drinks, sold in bottles or cans, whose consumption exceeds that of loose leaves. While 1 billion liters were produced annually in 1990, more than 4 billion were produced in the early 2000s, and, in 2017, more than 6 billion. Green tea beverages dominate production (2.8 billion liters in 2017, i.e. over 40% of total production), followed by black tea (1 billion liters) and wulong (0.8 billion liters); barley "tea" beverages are also sold in significant quantities (0.8 billion liters). These tea beverages are made from low-grade tea leaves, and their growth has encouraged growers to switch to lower-quality production).

== Japanese tea trade ==
=== Traders and brands ===
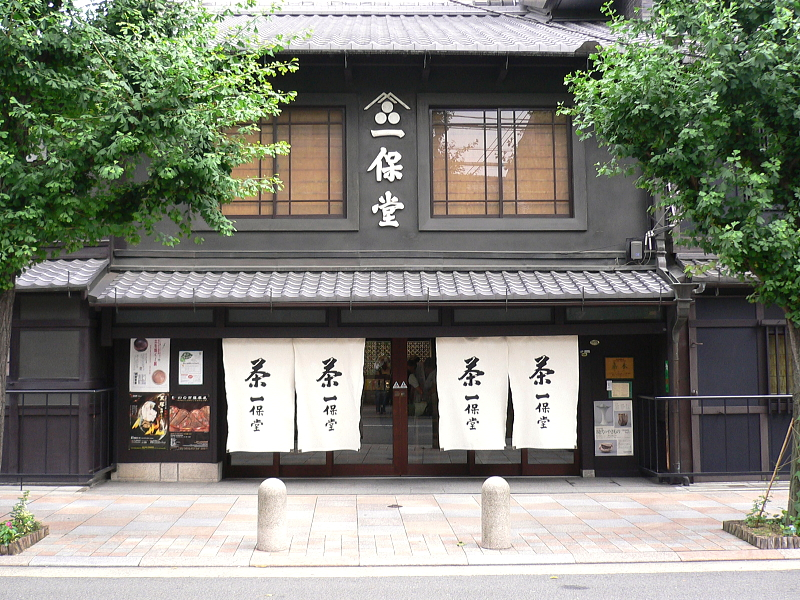
Storefront of the Ippodo tea merchant-assemblers in Kyoto

Final production, assembly, and sale of tea have traditionally been in the hands of merchants, such as the Uji merchants who sold tea from their region in the Muromachi and Edo eras, tea merchants' guilds and tea-specialized wholesale houses (cha-doiya). Several of these houses still exist and are major players in the sector, belonging to the category of Japanese companies known as shinise, whose operations have been passed down within the same family, sometimes for many generations, many of them having been founded in the 19th century: in Uji, for example, Tsuen and Kanbayashi; in Kyoto, Fukujuen and Ippodo. Since the seventeenth century, these merchants (starting with those in Uji) have been in the habit of naming the teas they blend and market to distinguish them from the blends offered by competitors, which often have a very similar taste.

The tea beverage market (which now exceeds that of tea leaves) involves economically more important players, although they are regularly associated with the most prestigious tea merchant houses. The company that played the driving role in the innovations leading to the emergence of tea in plastic cans and bottles is Ito En, which as of 2017 is the market leader, notably with its Oi Ocha green tea brand. In 2017, it accounted for an estimated 40% of sales of green tea beverages, and absorbed around a quarter of the raw tea leaves produced in Japan (this company also sells tea in leaf or bag form). The remainder of this sector is occupied by companies already specializing in beverage sales, such as Suntory, which specializes in alcoholic beverages and has teamed up with the Fukujuen trading house to produce the Iyemon Tokucha green tea brand, and Coca-Cola, which has teamed up with the Kanbayashi trading house to produce bottles of the Ayataka green tea brand.

=== International trade ===
Japan has been a major exporter of green tea since it opened up to the world in the 1850s, mainly to the United States. Production for overseas markets subsequently became minimal, amounting to around 300 tonnes of green tea in the early 1990s, while at the same time, 42,000 tonnes were imported, mainly good-quality black tea. The boom in tea beverages subsequently forced the archipelago's manufacturers to import raw leaves at a high level, as domestic production could not meet their demand, but it gradually adjusted. Furthermore, the Japanese invested in nearby countries such as China, Indonesia, and Vietnam to produce Japanese-style sencha teas, as domestic production was insufficient to cover demand. Although there has been a rapid decline in the quantities of teas imported into Japan, this trade remains important in volume terms, and the balance of international tea trade remains in deficit for Japan; the most important imports come from China (85%), primarily oolong, but also jasmine tea and Pu-erh.

In terms of green tea alone, the balance remained in deficit in the early 2000s: for around 600 tonnes exported in 2001, over 17,000 tonnes were imported. However, the trend towards greater domestic production continued and, by 2016, green tea imports had fallen to around 3,600 tonnes. Conversely, green tea exports are on an upward trend, outstripping imports by around 4,100 tonnes in the same year, benefiting from the positive image of Japanese green teas (particularly matcha) in markets such as the US and Taiwan.

== Tea consumption in Japan ==
=== Ordinary consumption ===
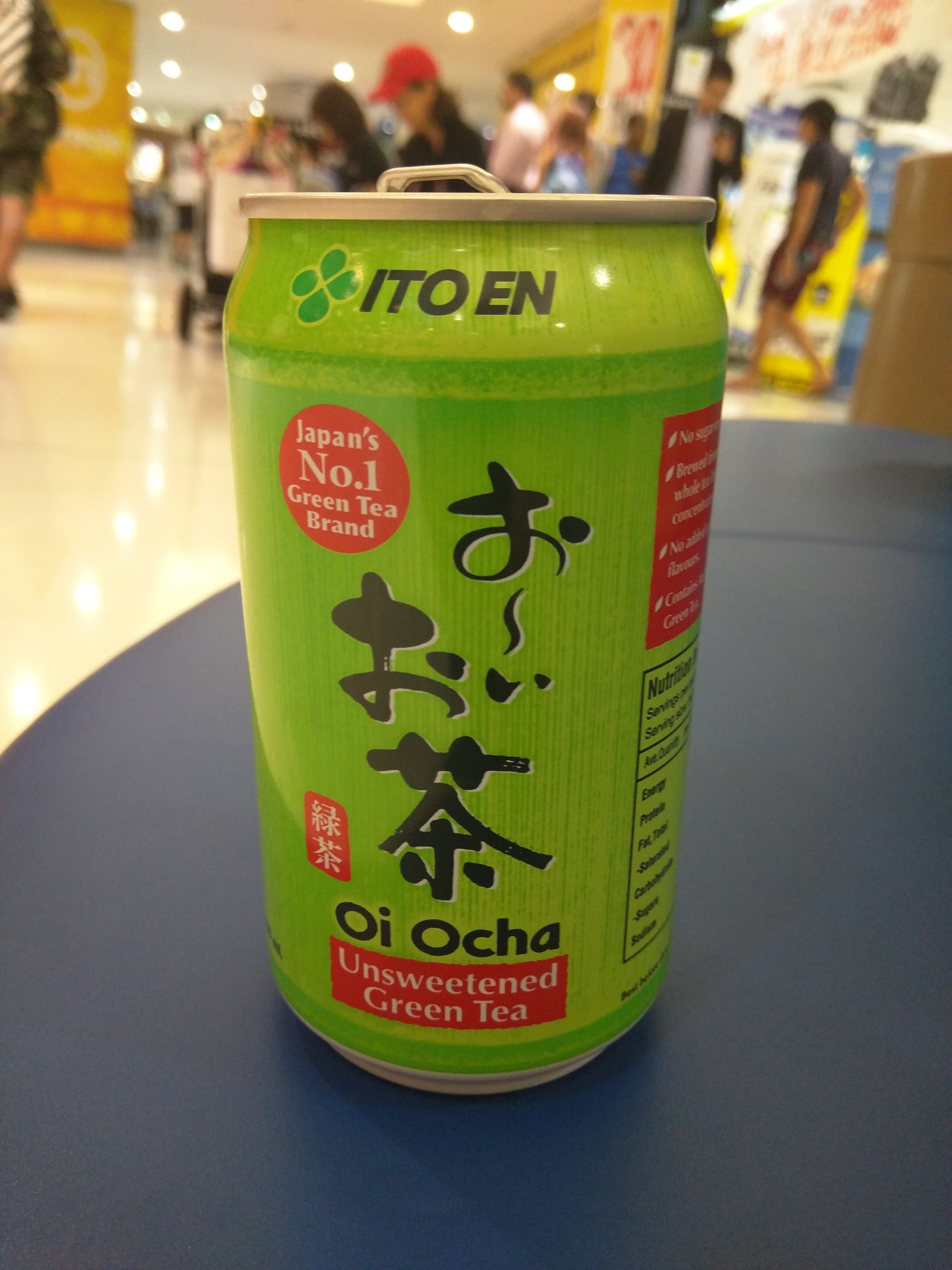
Can of the Oi Ocha brand from Ito En, Japan's market leader for tea beverages

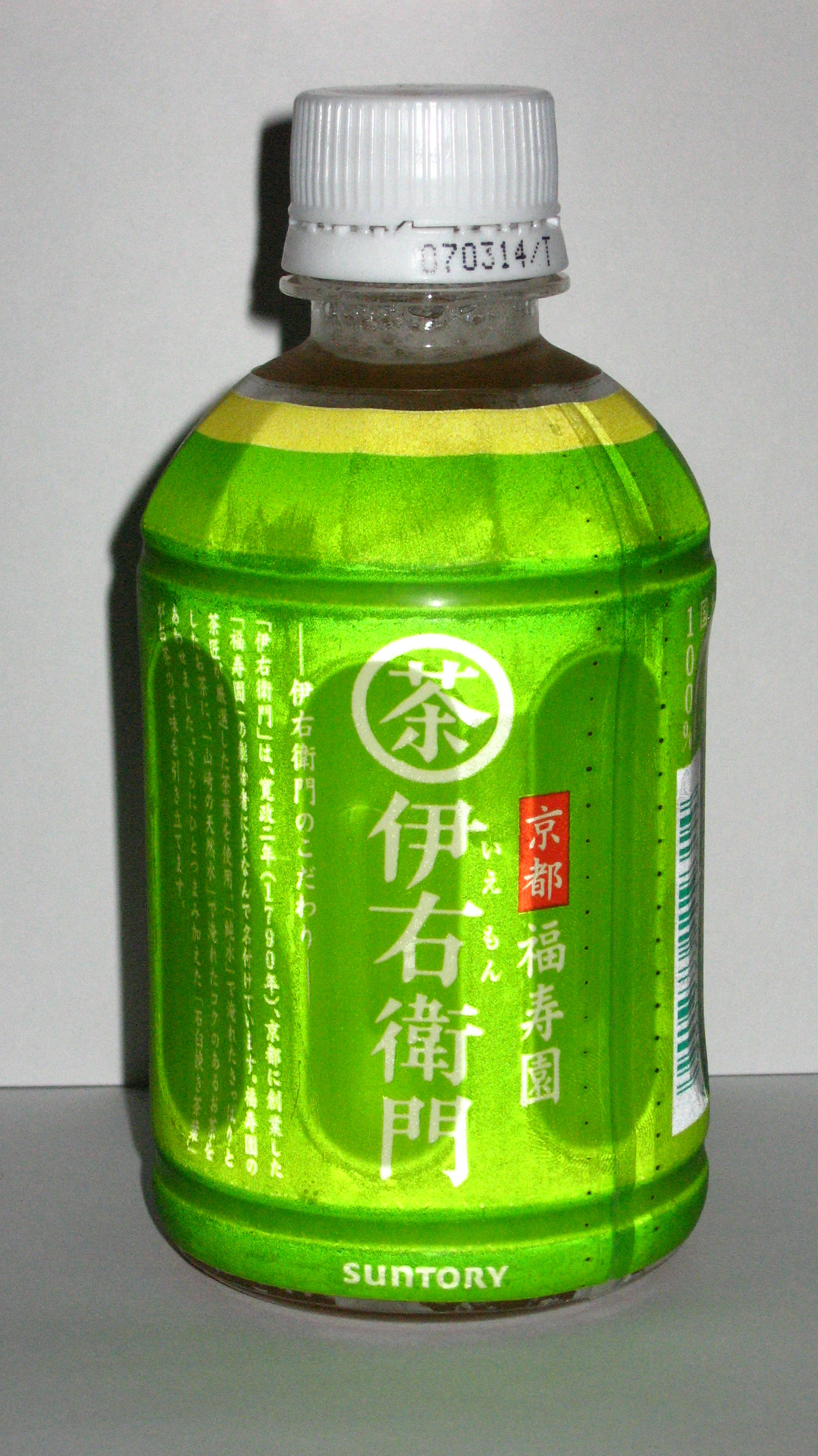
Bottled green tea from Suntory's Iyemon brand, the most common form of tea consumption in Japan in the 2010s

Since the Edo period, green tea from infused leaves has been the most common form of tea consumption. This includes sencha, but also the secondary qualities of bancha and hōjicha (roasted), which are traditionally the most common and are often served in communal places from large kettles. The consumption of powdered tea, matcha, has been relegated essentially to the tea ceremony or to abbreviated preparations, served in particular at tourist sites, and increasingly to culinary uses.

Tea, in whatever form, is the most widely consumed beverage in Japan. Since the early 2000s, consumption of green tea in Japanese households has remained fairly stable: 10,831 yen spent per household in 2016, compared with 10,559 in 2002. In detail, the main trend is the slow decline in consumption in the form of brewed leaf green tea (from 1,140 g per person to 856 g between 2002 and 2016), now supplanted in household expenditure by consumption in the form of green tea drinks in cans and plastic bottles. These have reached very high consumption levels, exceeding 20 liters per person in 2016, placing them just behind soft drinks, coffee drinks, and mineral water. Black tea and oolong drinks are also highly consumed. Of the total tea consumed in Japan, beverages in cans and bottles make up around 60% of the market, with loose-leaf tea accounting for the remainder. This change began in the early 1980s, when the process for serving tea in cans was developed, first for wulong, then for green tea. Then, in the 1990s, tea drinks in plastic bottles flooded the Japanese market. Cans and bottles are readily available in supermarkets, grocery stores (konbini), and vending machines, come in many variants, and are quicker to consume than brewed leaf tea, corresponding better to the expectations of today's consumers.

Tea consumption in Japan
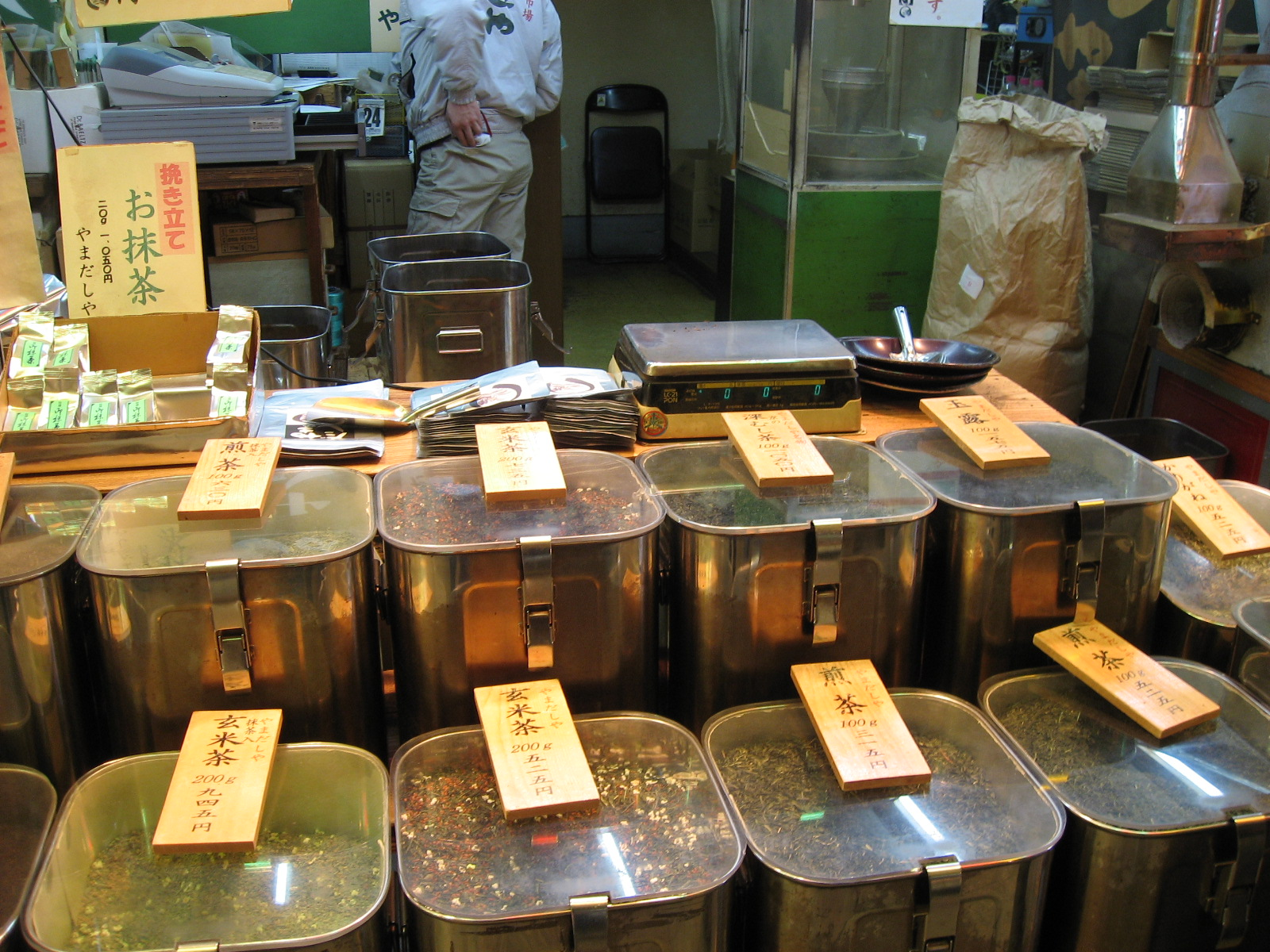
Bulk tea at a traditional tea stall in Kyoto

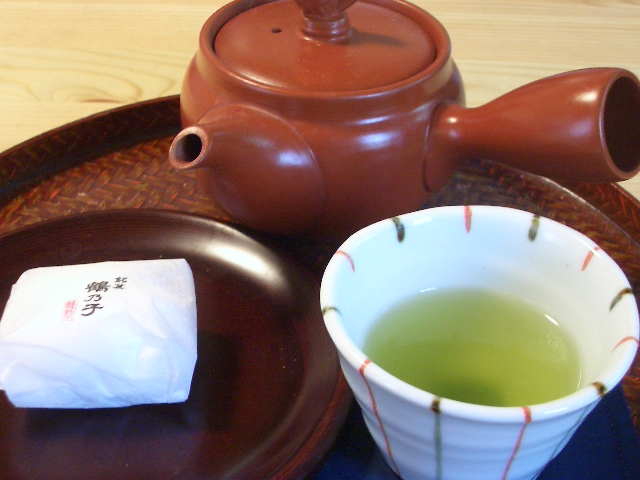
Tea bowl with kyūsu teapot

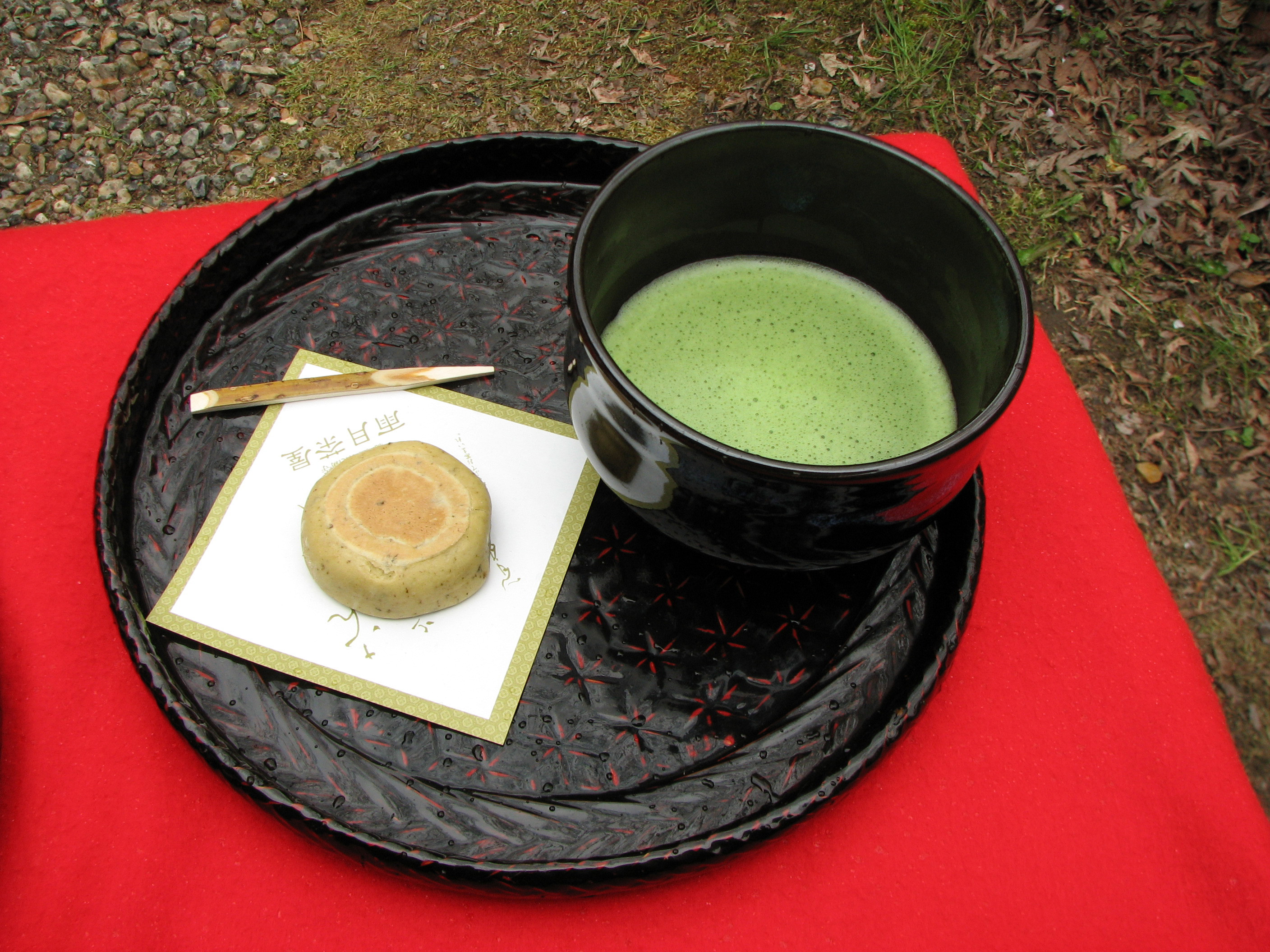
Matcha bowl with a pastry (wagashi), served at Kyoto's Daigo-ji

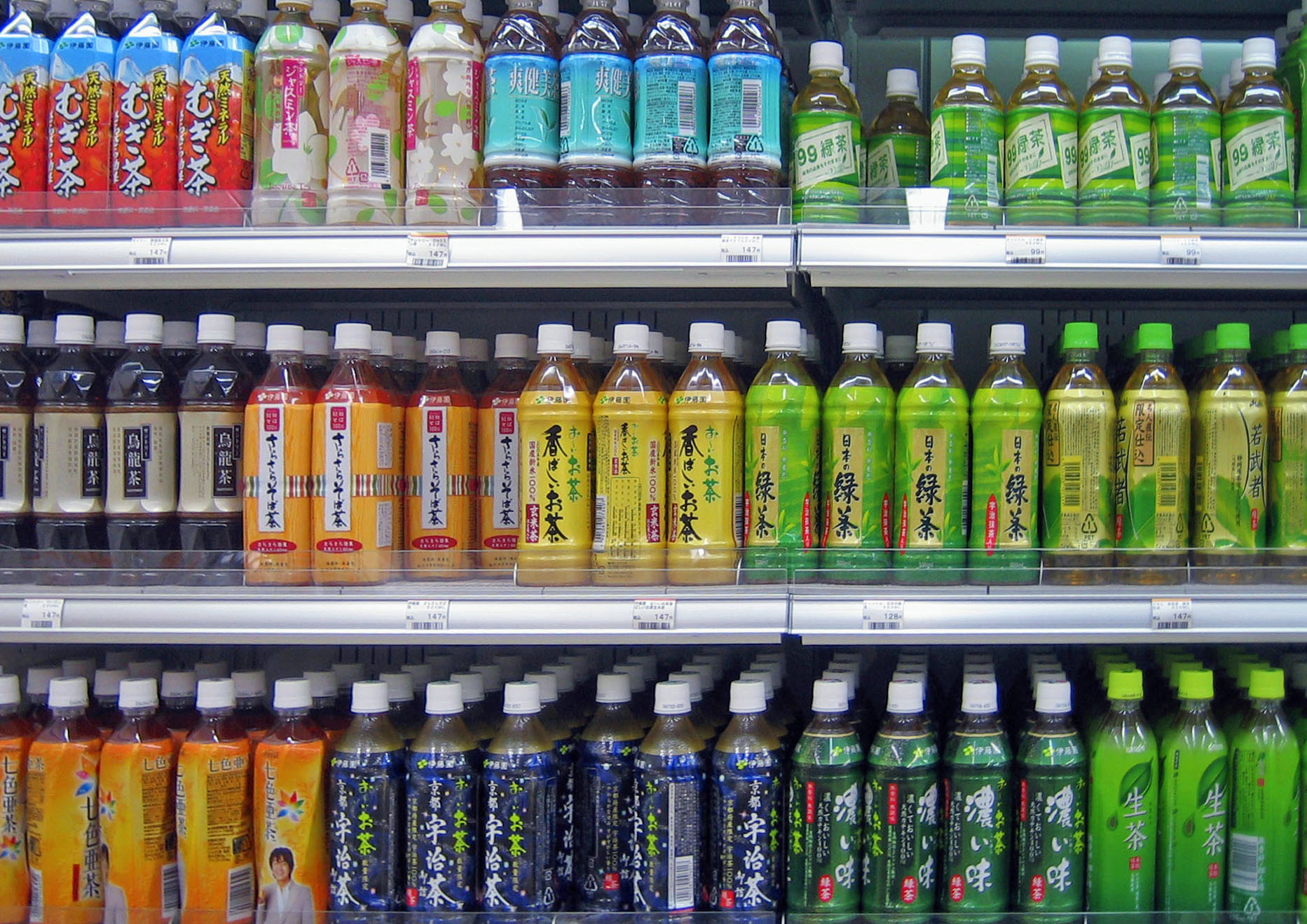
Cold tea drinks in plastic bottles at a convenience store in Japan

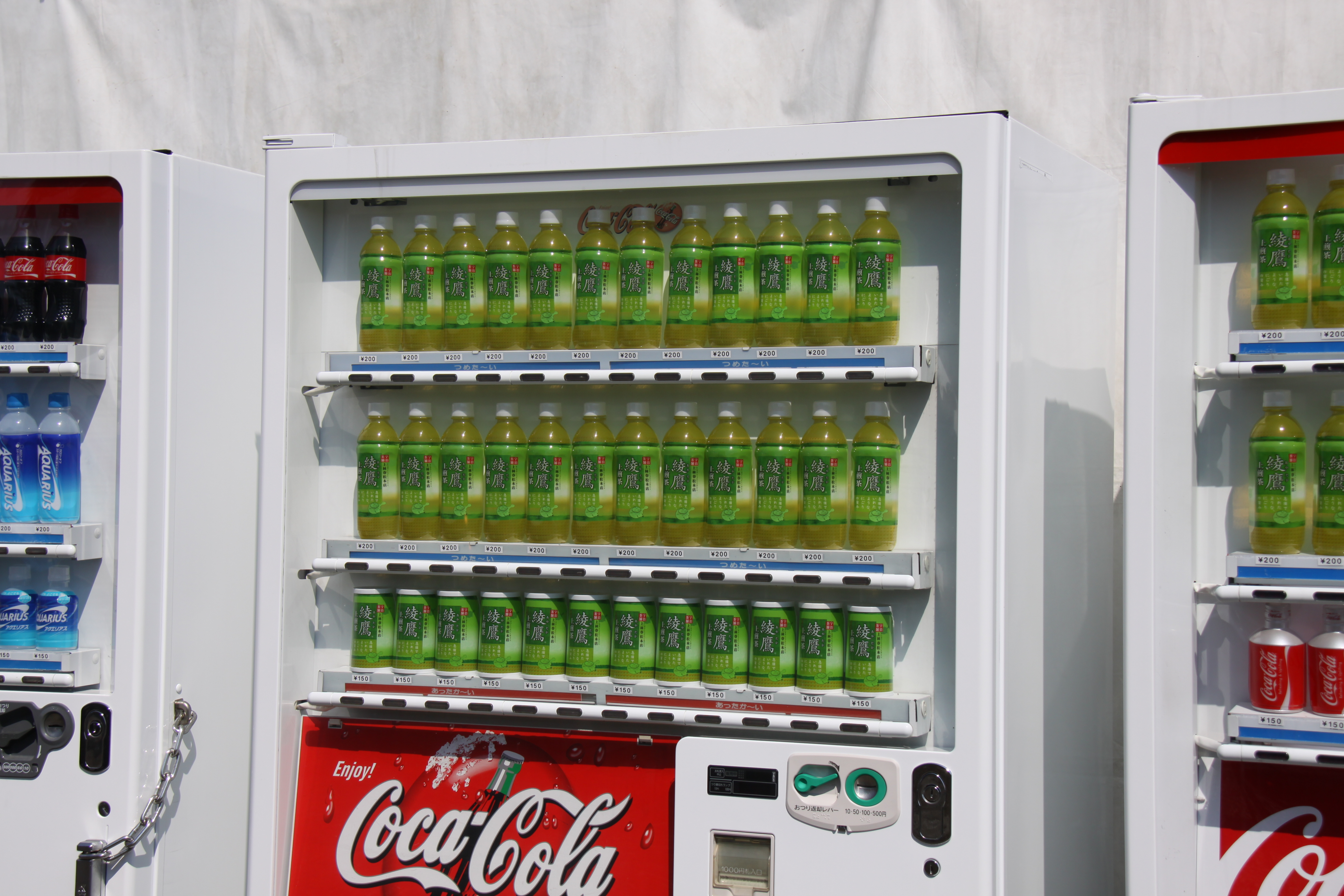
Bottle dispenser for Ayataka tea drinks (Coca-Cola brand)

=== Tea houses ===
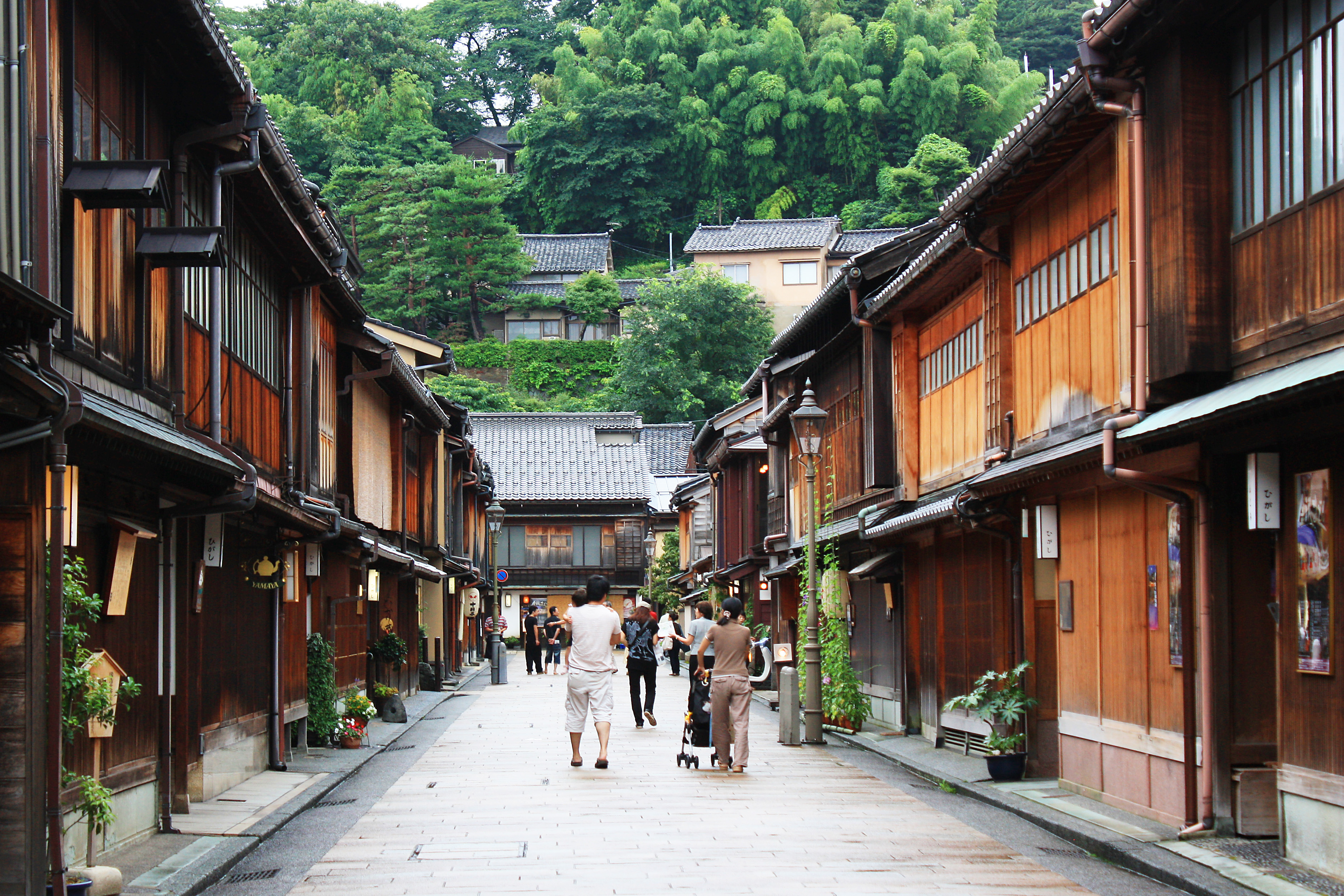
Higashi-Chaya, Kanazawa, a district of teahouses and shops renovated in traditional style

Tea houses, chaya or chamise (not to be confused with tea ceremony pavilions, chashitsu), developed from the late medieval period onwards, particularly along main roads, where they generally consisted of modest establishments offering communal tea. Subsequently, they became an essential element of village and neighborhood sociability. More elaborate variants appeared, offering various types of entertainment (sumo wrestling, theatrical performances, brothels), but these have since almost disappeared.

At the end of the 19th century, cafés began to appear and quickly became stiff competition for the teahouses, which were gradually ousted from the public arena. In fact, in Japan, tea and coffee are served separately, and the foods accompanying them are not mixed. Tea is perceived as a traditional beverage, served in places often seen as conservative and outdated, with an aging clientele, being served with traditional Japanese dishes, while coffee (and also black tea), the embodiment of modernity and Westernization, is served in trendier establishments with Western-inspired dishes (notably chocolate), to a younger, more dynamic public. Japanese-style teahouses are therefore outmoded in the modern age, and today's trend-setting teahouses are either following the café model, importing American-style teahouse formats, serving beverages such as green tea or chai and milk, or following the style of Chinese-style teahouses. However, traditional-style tea stalls are still common in tourist areas, especially places of worship.

=== Tea rituals ===
The originality of Japanese tea culture lies in the existence of gatherings revolving around the consumption of tea, which can be highly formalistic, involving precise gestures in the serving of tea, a well-considered aesthetic framework, as well as other snacks and meals, the tasting of tea itself being only one element of the ritual. The most common type of gathering is the "tea ceremony", cha no yu, developed since medieval times, in which the tea consumed is matcha, powdered, and whipped before drinking. The Edo period saw the emergence of a simpler ceremony for sencha, infused leaf tea.

==== Cha no yu, the "tea ceremony" ====
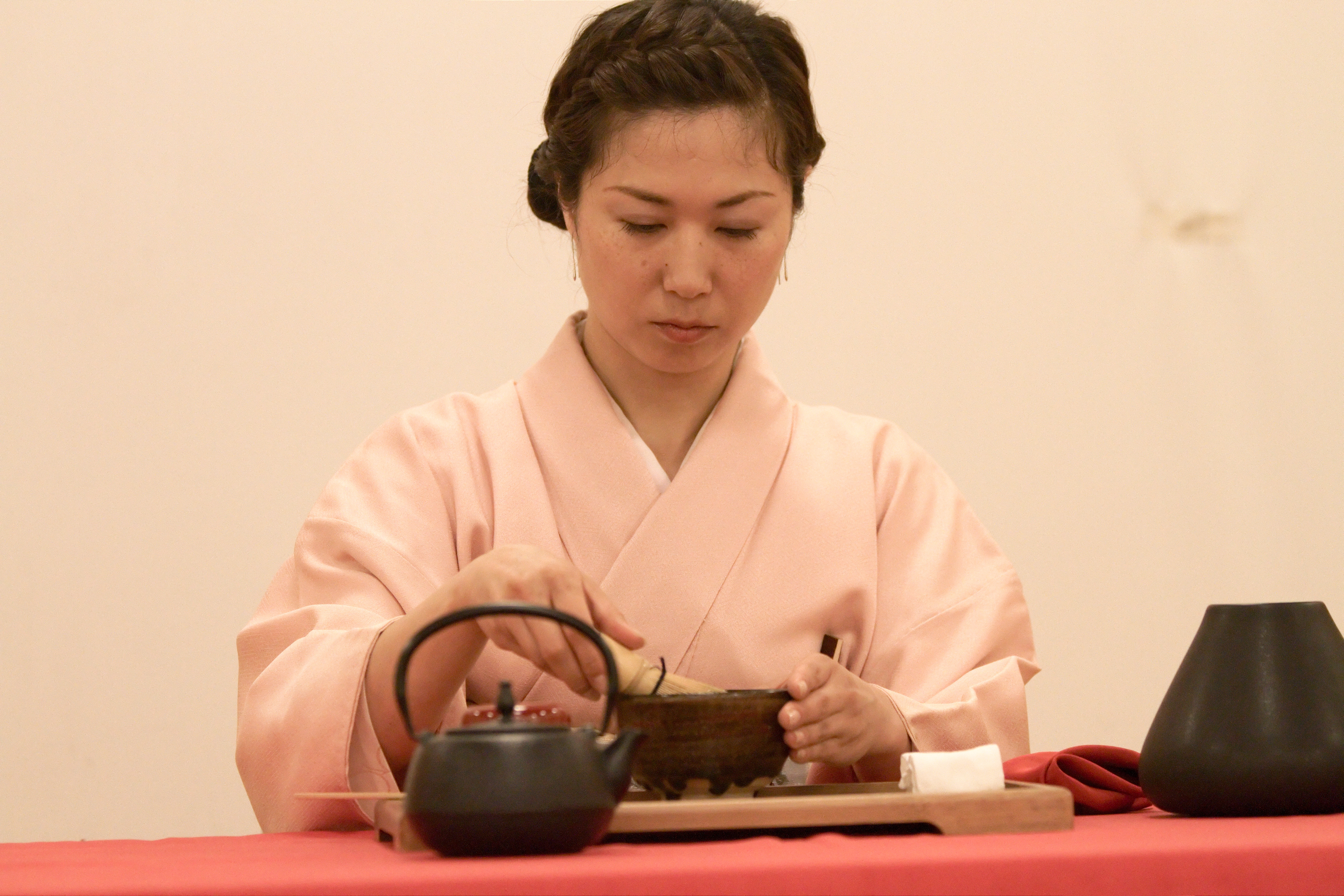
A woman preparing for a Japanese tea ceremony in 2010

"Tea ceremony" is the Western designation for the ritualized form of drinking powdered tea that the Japanese rather call cha no yu (茶の湯, lit. "hot water for tea"), or sadō (茶道, " way of tea"). It gradually appeared during the second half of the medieval period, starting with tea-drinking gatherings, the proceedings of which were formalized by a series of tea masters strongly influenced by Zen Buddhism, notably Murata Jukō (1422–1502), Takeno Jōō (1502–1555) and Sen no Rikyū (1522–1591). A ceremonial style was established, marked by the consumption of whipped tea and a meal (kaiseki), and incorporating the principles of wabi (侘び), the pursuit of elegance in simplicity and tranquility, and sabi (寂), a nostalgic contemplation of the passage of time that valued objects with an aged, rustic character. After the latter's departure, the ritual split into several variants, with schools proposing their own ritual with original gestures (temae), each with a hierarchical organization, dominated by a master, iemoto, following an organization common in traditional Japanese arts. Tea ceremony schools were subsequently created, even in the second half of the 20th century.

From the earliest times, tea masters attached great importance to the aesthetic environment in which powdered tea was consumed, and it was its integration into a larger ensemble that gave the tea ceremony much of its appeal. This applies first and foremost to the objects, which are chosen with care, whether they are ceramics imported from China, or made in Japan by craftsmen chosen expressly by the tea masters, who regularly collaborate with workshops to obtain the products they desire. Secondly, the rooms in which the tea ceremonies took place, initially modest shoin-style rooms (usually 4.5 tatami), then tea pavilions (chashitsu) which, in line with the principles promoted by Sen no Rikyū, had to have a rustic appearance, making them resemble thatched cottages. Their development was accompanied by that of the tea gardens (roji), where people strolled before the ceremony, a preliminary ritual before entering the pavilion. The decor of the place where the ceremony takes place is also supposed to be chosen with care and modesty, expressing the good taste of the master of the premises: shelves and other furniture from the shoin style repertoire, vertical scrolls (kakemono) adorned with paintings and/or calligraphy, floral arrangements (chabana).

Tea ceremony aesthetics
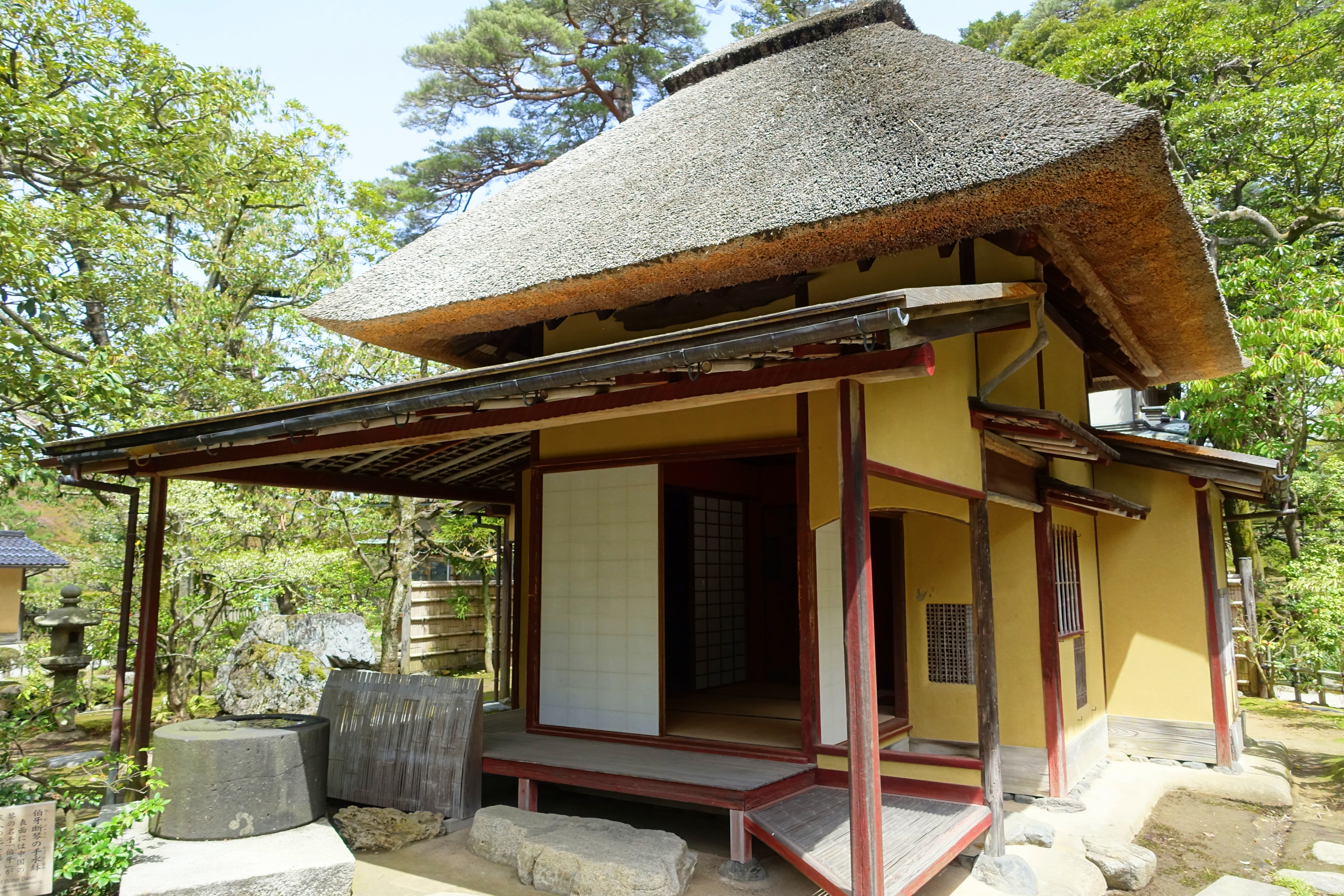
A "rustic" style tea pavilion (chashitsu), similar to a thatched cottage, Kanazawa

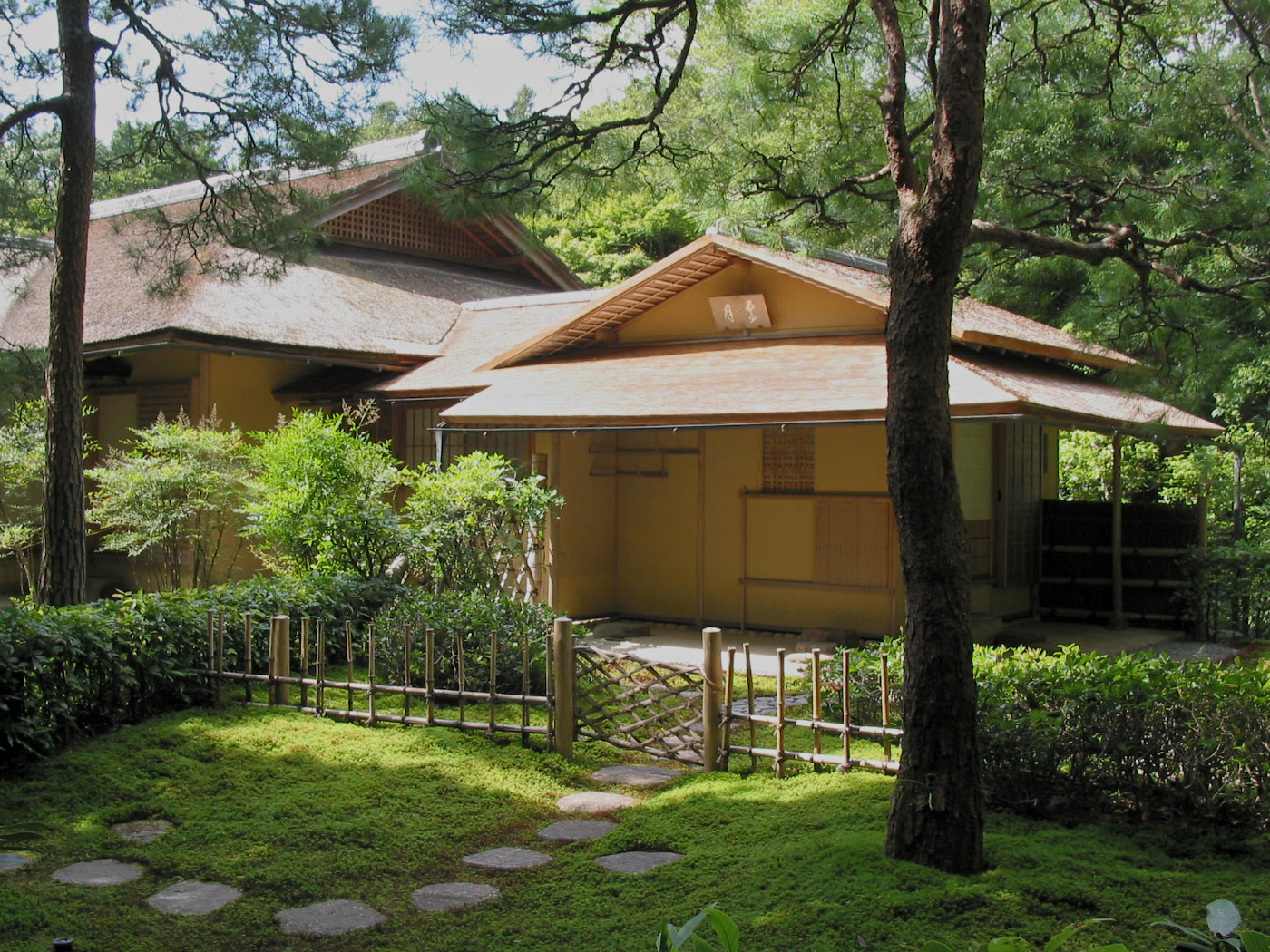
A tea pavilion (chashitsu) in a tea garden (roji), Ise Grand Shrine

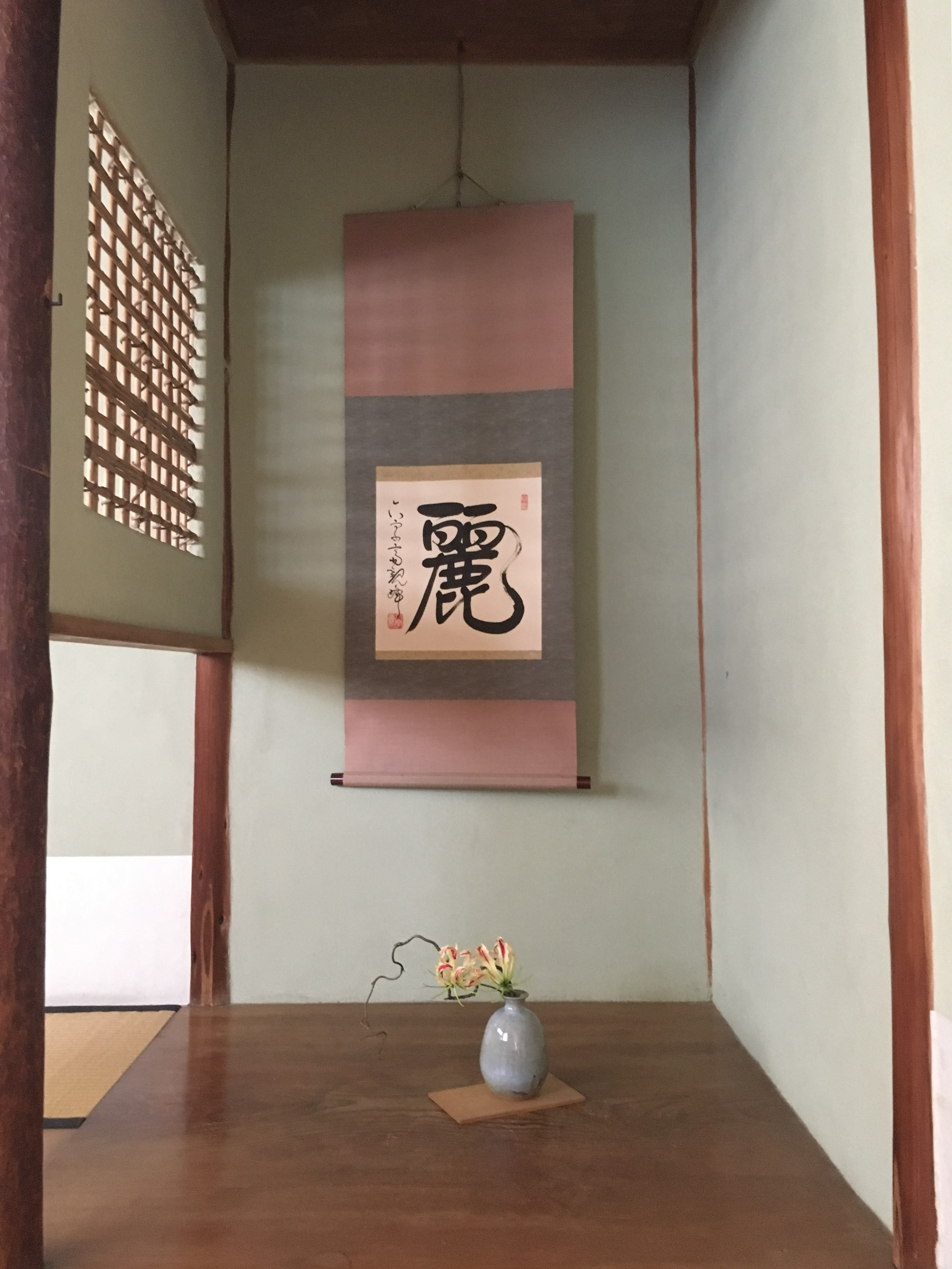
Floral arrangement (chabana) and calligraphic hanging scroll (kakemono) in the alcove of a tea room

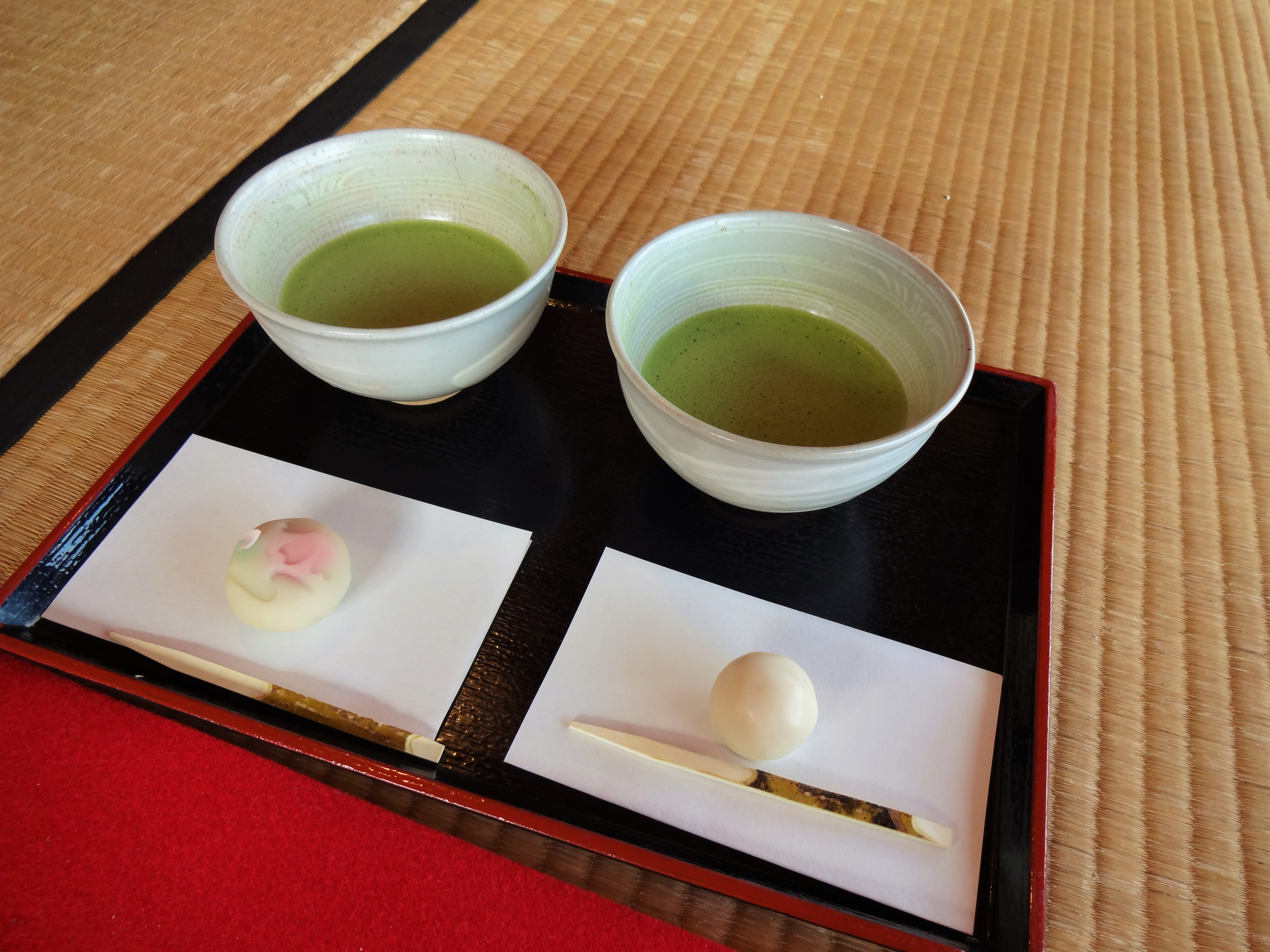
Tray with two cups of matcha accompanied by sweet desserts during a tea ceremony at the Hama-rikyū Gardens in Tokyo

Although the consumption of powdered tea (matcha) has long since been replaced by leaf tea (sencha and its derivatives), and the number of tea drinkers is small in proportion to the Japanese population, the tea ceremony retains a key historical and cultural importance, since it is through this ceremony that tea conquered the archipelago. In modern times, it has become a defining element of Japanese culture and identity, and is often portrayed as such to foreigners, as well as to Japanese, who are often unfamiliar with it, particularly in the context of tourism. The practice of the tea ceremony has opened up considerably since the Edo period, when it was essentially intended for a wealthy, male audience. In the Meiji era, its mastery became one of the qualities required of those who wished to conform to the ideal of a good housewife. An abundance of literature produced by the various schools since the Edo period has helped to spread the practice, and today tea ceremony courses for everyone, including in the extracurricular curriculum, and objects for practicing the tea ceremony (albeit of basic quality) are readily available.

In the 21st century, the classic tea ceremony is a tea gathering, chaji, in which the host is accompanied by one to five guests, received in the tea room or pavilion in an intimate ceremony. Essentially, the ceremony takes place in the afternoon, lasting around four hours. It begins with a meal (kaiseki), after which the charcoal is placed in the furnace, followed by an interlude consisting of a fresh sweet (omogashi), before the first service of strong tea (koicha) and, after the charcoal has been placed in the furnace for a second time, the second service, this time of light tea (usucha) accompanied by a sweet. In detail, the rules specific to each school prescribe the gestures to be performed, the objects and utensils to be brought together, the succession of kaiseki dishes, etc. Meetings involving a wider public, chakai, held in public or private places (monasteries and shrines, cultural centers, large hotels) are also part of the tea schools' activity, but here the ritual is simpler, consisting of the distribution of a light tea accompanied by sweets. Matcha is also often served in this simplified form on an informal basis, for example to tourists visiting temples and shrines.

There are three major modern schools of tea ceremony, Omotesenke, Urasenke and Mushakōjisenke. Their practices are very similar. To take the Urasenke school as an example, the ceremony begins when guests pass through a gate left ajar to welcome them. They enter alone into an antechamber with a wet floor. Here, they remove their coats and change their shoes before entering a second room where they find bowls of hot water. They then exit into the garden where the tea pavilion is located: the host comes out, greets them in silence and accompanies them inside. Before entering, everyone washes their hands and mouths with water from a basin placed near the front door, the nijirigushi, an opening that forces one to crawl in to get rid of any pride. Inside the house is the kakemono, a painting hung on the wall to be contemplated while the kettle heats in a charcoal fire and incense burns. In the adjoining room, the master of ceremonies prepares a meal that must be aesthetically pleasing and tasty, but very light. It is eaten with chopsticks of green bamboo gathered just before consumption. The master then feeds the fire and serves a cake to his guests, who return to the garden while he prepares for the rest of the ceremony. He puts away the kakemono and replaces it with a floral arrangement, then prepares his utensils, a tea caddy filled with tea powder. Next to the box, the host places a silk towel to dry the utensils after use. When the tea-making equipment is ready, the master of ceremonies strikes a gong to let his guests in again. He uses a bamboo spoon to draw the powder from the tea caddy and pour it into a tea bowl, then a bamboo whisk to stir the beverage in the bowl until it foams to a precise height and thickness. The highly concentrated tea is served to the guest of honor, then each person passes the bowl to his or her neighbor to take a sip. The master then wipes down the utensils. With new utensils, the master prepares a lighter tea and serves small pastries to his guests, in a relaxed atmosphere. He then leaves by the front door and meditates in silence while the participants chat. Once they've all left, he meditates a little longer, then cleans and tidies up the utensils and the ceremony room. The entire ritual can last up to four hours.

==== The way of sencha ====
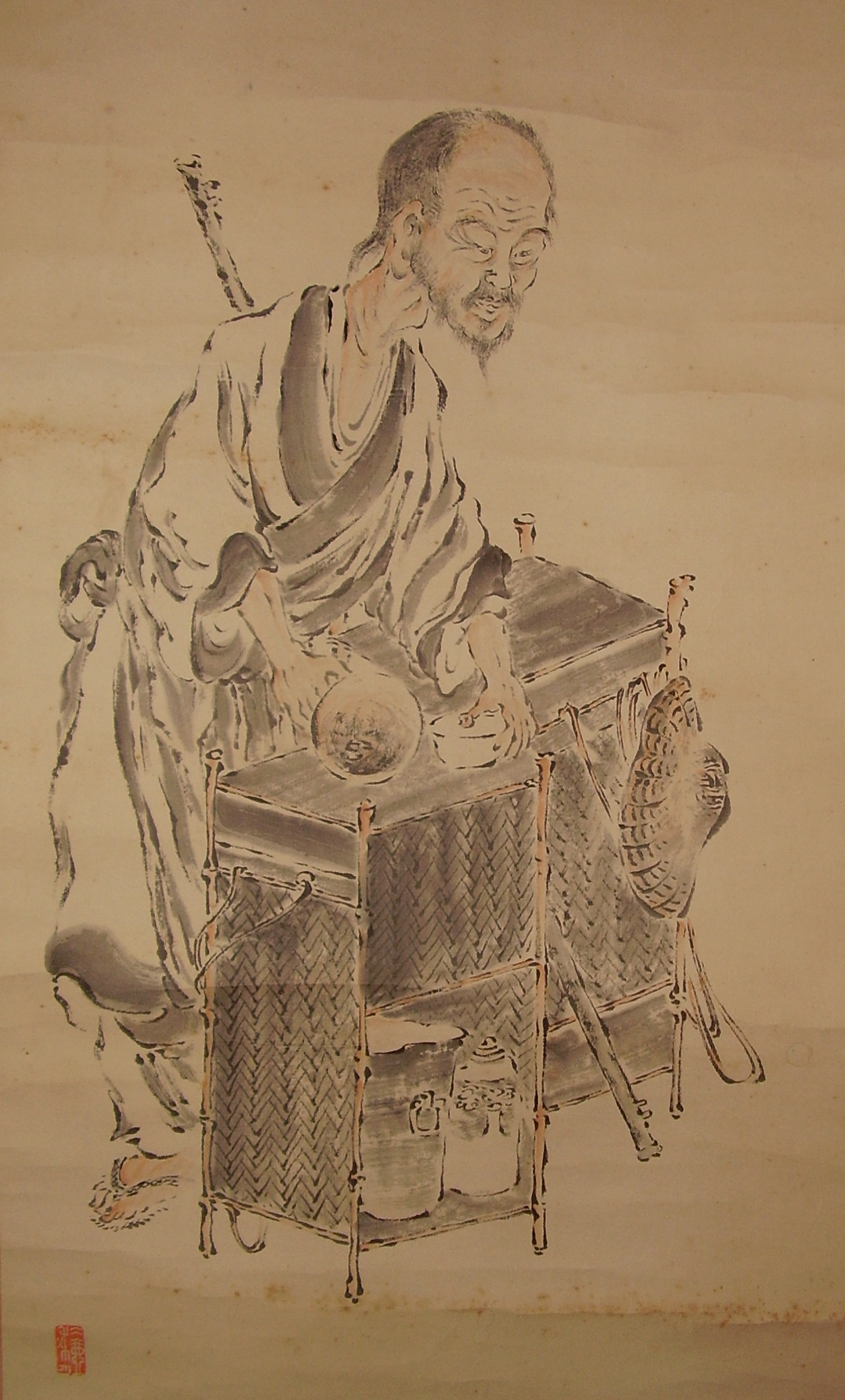
Caricature of the Buddhist monk Baisaō selling tea, which he makes on demand using the cabinet he carries

Sencha was developed in the early eighteenth century by Nagatani Sōen. The monk Baisaō popularized the beverage, promoting a free and simple approach (all one had to do was brew the sencha leaves before consuming the drink), in contrast to the extreme formalism of the tea ceremony of his time. At the end of his life, Baisaō gave up selling tea and burned his utensils. In the second half of the eighteenth century, the painter Kimura Kenkadō and the writer Ueda Akinari extended the consumption of tea, but with greater emphasis on the veneration of beautiful objects and utensils, particularly those used by their master, even though this was clearly opposed to their master's principles. They served sencha at banquets attended by Edo's most prominent people, known as shogakai. The "way of the sencha" (煎茶道, senchadō), later formalized, proposed a simpler aesthetic and freer ritual compared to that of the tea ceremony, even though its precepts brought it closer to its competitor. Schools of sencha appeared: the Osaka merchant Tanaka Kakuō (1782–1848) founded the Kagetsuan school, and the doctor-samurai Ogawa Kashin (1786–1855) founded the Ogawa school. The guiding principle of this art of brewed tea is fūryū (風流, "elegance"). Today, the sencha way is recognized as traditional Japanese art.

In principle, sencha should infuse in water reaching a maximum of 80 °C; for better quality teas, the temperature should be lower, down to around 50–60 °C for the best varieties (also for gyokuro). Boiling water, therefore, needs to be cooled, which can be done in two ways. The most common is to transfer the water successively into three (or two) cups, lowering the temperature by roughly 10 °C with each transfer. The more refined method uses the yuzamashi, a container for cold water. Whichever solution is chosen, the water, cooled to the right temperature, is then poured into the "teapot" (急須, kyūsu), at the bottom of which the tea leaves have been placed. The infusion must last a specific time, after which the tea is poured into the cups and consumed. Several infusions are made in succession in the same way, each lasting less time than the last.

=== Other traditional opportunities for consumption ===
The role of tea in traditional Japanese culture can also be seen in the fact that it is consumed or offered on a variety of occasions, not necessarily involving a formal tea ceremony.

Tea, introduced to the archipelago by Buddhist monks, is commonly found in a religious context. As early as the 14th century, when tea was still relatively unknown in Japanese society, it was offered to Buddha during religious ceremonies; today, this type of ritual still exists, such as the Ochamori at Saidai-ji in Nara. Subsequently, the offering of tea to the gods in temples and shrines became commonplace. Today's tea gatherings often take place in these places, especially during religious festivals such as matsuri. These tea-drinking gatherings go well beyond the religious sphere, as they are also held during commemorations, sporting events, or visits by representatives of foreign countries.

In some localities, traditional tea-drinking practices have been preserved. In Nakazoshi (Kashihara, Nara Prefecture), for example, a few families continue an old tradition of grinding to powder the tea leaves they produce in a family setting, with their own millstones, and consuming it whipped, with a pinch of salt and rice crackers (きりこ, kiriko) dipped in it, in a less formal way, traditionally at tea gatherings between village folk.

Tea is also often offered on various occasions, as one of a wide range of small Japanese gifts, often of an obligatory nature, given to family, friends, colleagues, or guests. Tea is thus common as a typical omiyage (お土産, lit. "product of the land"), brought back in this case after visiting a tea-producing region.

==== Tea objects ====
Normal consumption of sencha, bancha or hōjicha infused leaf tea is usually limited to a kettle to heat the water in which the leaves are immersed (and increasingly, bags of leaves or powder, following a practice imported from the West). For the more elaborate forms of leaf tea consumption, generally using better-quality leaves (sencha, gyokuro or tamaryokucha), a ceramic pot is used, consisting of at least cups and the small (usually 36 cl, sometimes less) earthenware porcelain teapot or pan known as a kyusū. Sometimes, particularly for "way of sencha" rituals, a pot called yuzamashi is added to cool the water.

Items for drinking infused tea
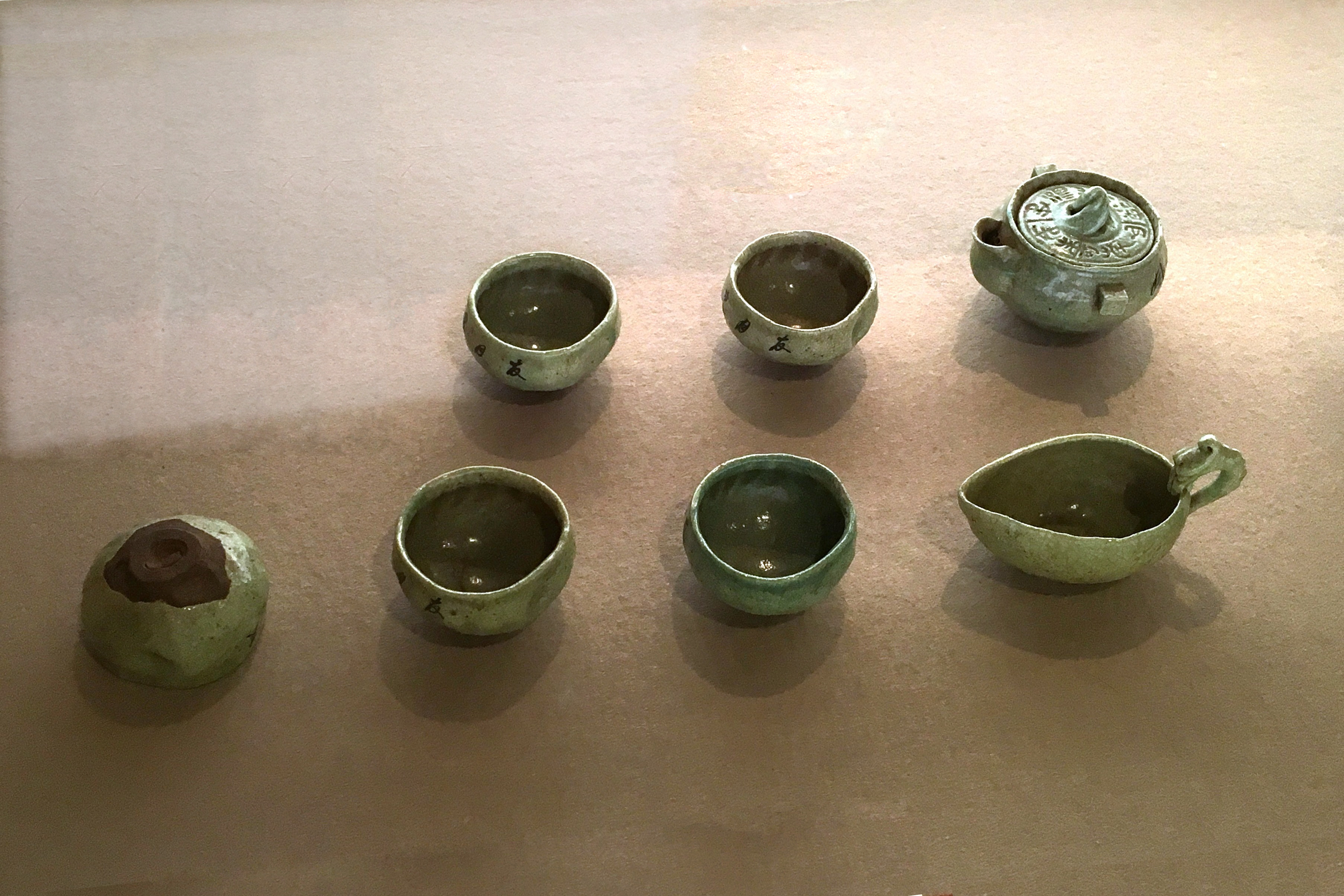
Edo period sencha serving set, 18th - 19th centuries, Sasashima kilns. Aichi Prefectural Museum.

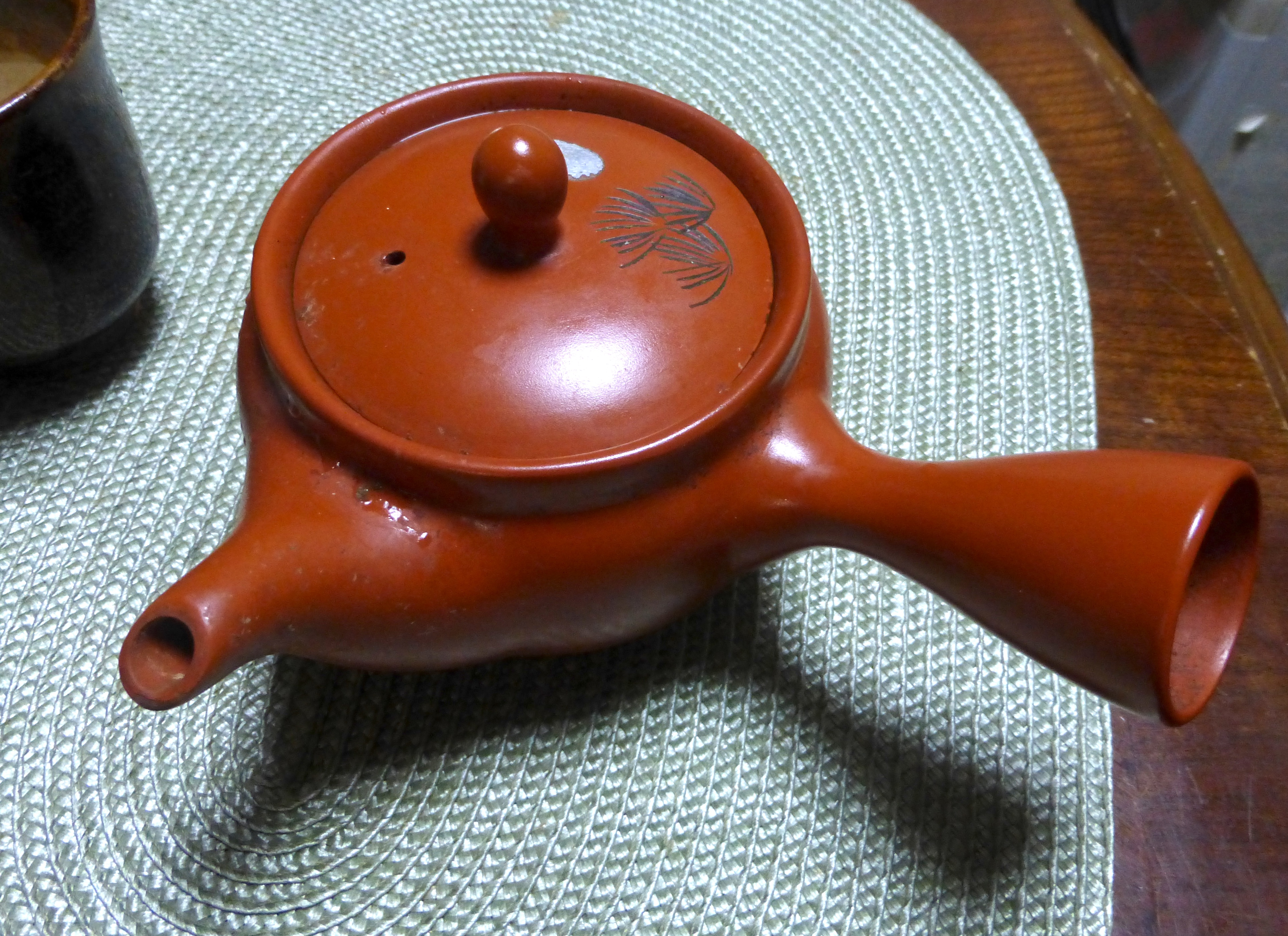
Kyūsu of the common type

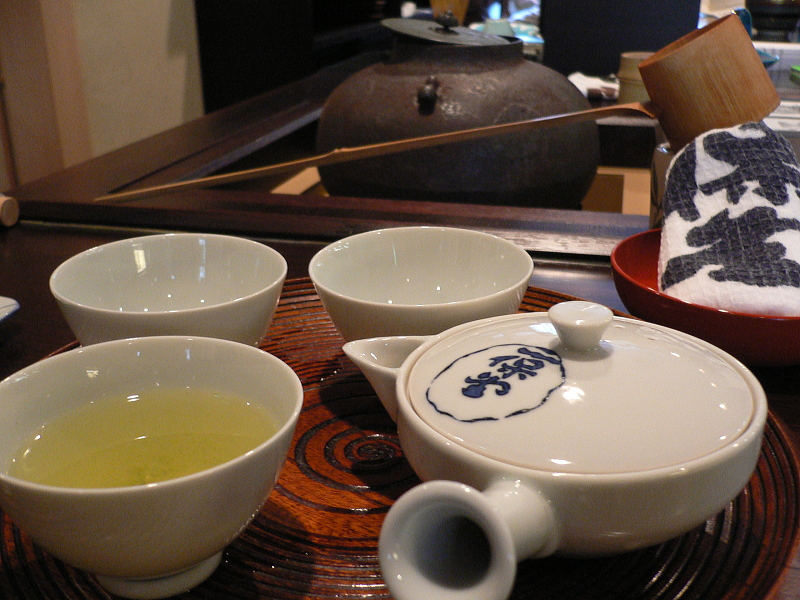
Traditional brewed tea set (gyokuro tea), Kaboku tea house in Ippodo, Kyoto

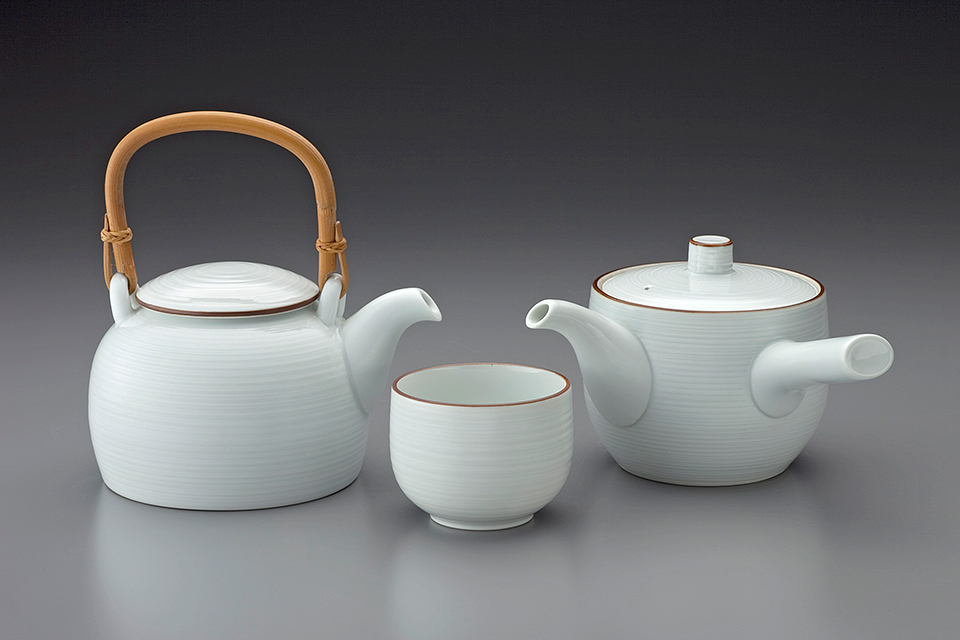
Modern sencha serving set, made by ceramist Masahiro Mori in 1971

Tea ceremonies and their demanding aesthetics gave rise to a much more elaborate art of ceramics and utensils, often bordering on the ritualistic. The early tea masters who laid the foundations of this art paid great attention to the choice of objects used, which had to correspond to the general aesthetic framework of the ritual. Chinese motifs in popularity at the time of Muromachi played an important role in the development of Japanese tea ceramics, notably the dark-colored bowls called jian (nicknamed "hare's fur"), known as tenmoku in the archipelago, or the tea powder boxes (cha-ire) produced in Fujian. Murata Jukō, who developed the concept of wabi in the art of tea, was the first to promote Japanese products, primarily from the Shigaraki and Bizen kilns. This trend took hold with Takeno Jōō and Sen no Rikyū, who favored objects with a rough appearance, and who, while appreciating Korean pottery, commissioned Japanese artisans directly to make objects with the appearance they desired. The collaboration between tea masters and craftsmen was thus highly productive, even though objects of Chinese origin remained very popular in the Edo period (such as the blue and white porcelains from the Jingdezhen kilns, which produced pieces specifically adapted to Japanese demand), as the taste of the time appreciated the association between "Chinese things" (karamono) and "Japanese things" (wamono).

In the 21st century, the collaboration between craftsmen and tea masters continues, with each school generally having its own artists and their organization operating according to the same hereditary principle. After declining during the country's early industrialization, Japanese craftsmanship underwent a revival from the 1920s onwards, notably with the distinction, from 1955 onwards, of craftsmen elevated to the status of "Living National Treasure". Many of them work on tea ceremony objects. Tea aficionados, and Japanese aesthetes in general, have long attached great importance to objects and fine manual production, with traditional craft arts seen as a national heritage. As part of the tea ceremony ritual, each object has its own role to play and must be chosen with taste, purified, and presented to guests, who must take the time to contemplate it. The most famous objects carry a name (mei) that sets them apart, their presentation is eagerly awaited by those taking part in the ceremony, and they serve as models for the creation of new objects. Tea objects are also among the souvenirs brought back by tourists.

In the broadest sense, this covers a wide range of objects. Wooden objects include furniture for tea rooms, such as shelves (daisu, tana) or screens (furosaki), as well as objects directly involved in the ritual. Great attention is paid to fireplace frames (robuchi), meal trays (shokuro), incense boxes (kōgō), cold water containers (mizusashi) and tea caddies (natsume). They are made using high-quality woods and can be left bare, decorated, painted, or lightly lacquered. The same utensils can be made in lacquer, applied to a base of wood, ceramic, metal, or paper-mâché. The decoration can be completed with gold lacquer, nacre, or metal inlays. Bamboo is used to make ornamental vases, charcoal baskets (sumitori), tea spoons (chashaku), and their cases (tomo-zutsu), as well as tea whisks (chasen). Kettles (kama) are made of cast iron. Cold and waste water containers (kensui) can also be made of metal. Ceramics have long been the major art form for the tea ceremony, produced in the same workshops since late medieval times (Bizen, Mino), although processes have generally been modernized, even if some ceramists use kilns crafted according to ancient methods. These workshops produce jars, teapots, bowls/tea cups (chawan), and dishes used for the kaiseki meal. Some craftsmen have chosen to reproduce the methods used by the first tea masters, by studying ancient models; others have introduced different approaches, sometimes drawing inspiration from the lustrous and glazed porcelains of Persia and China, or developing more original approaches.

Objects for the tea ceremony
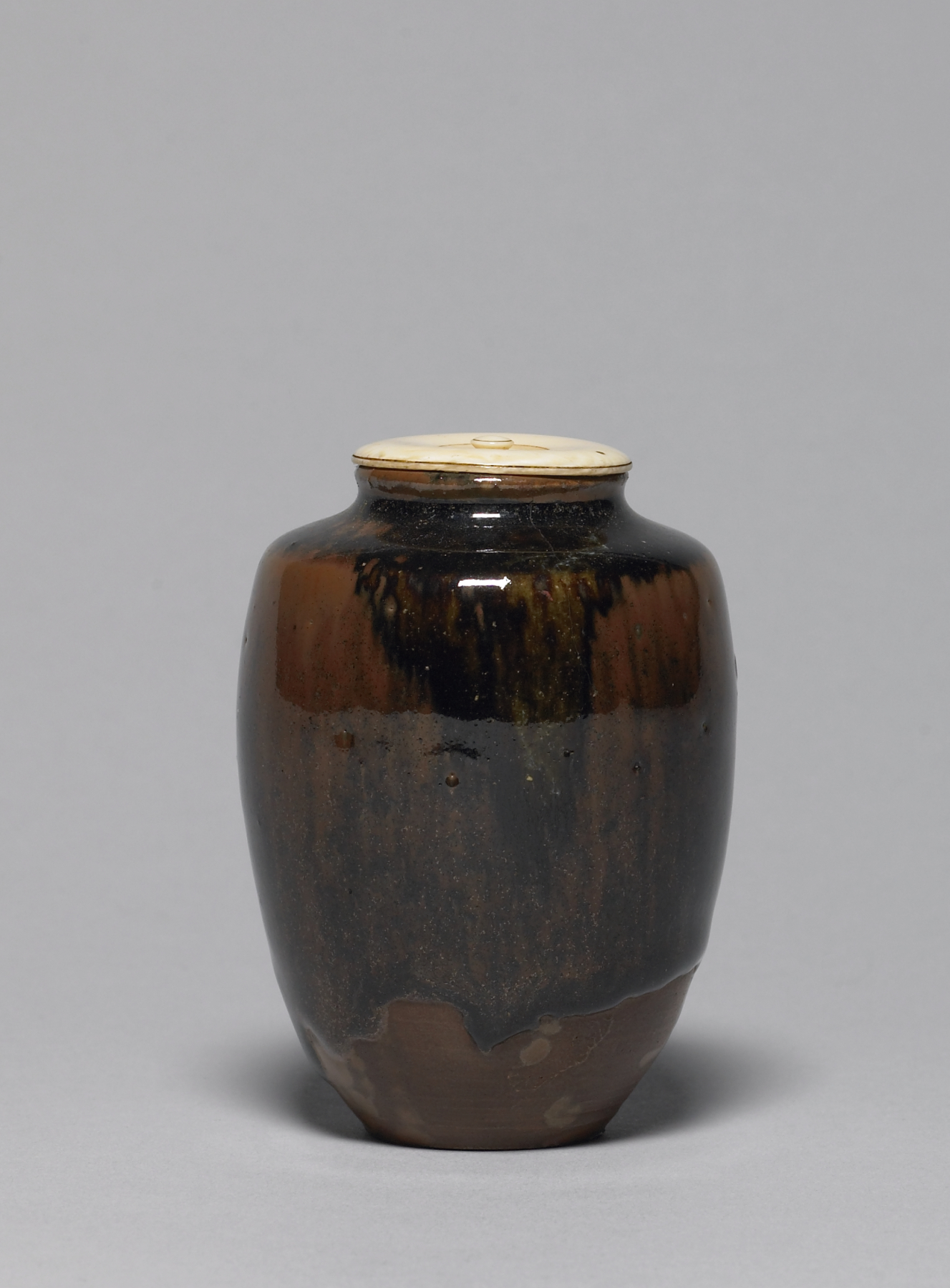
Tea pot (cha-ire), first half of the 19th century. Walters Art Museum.

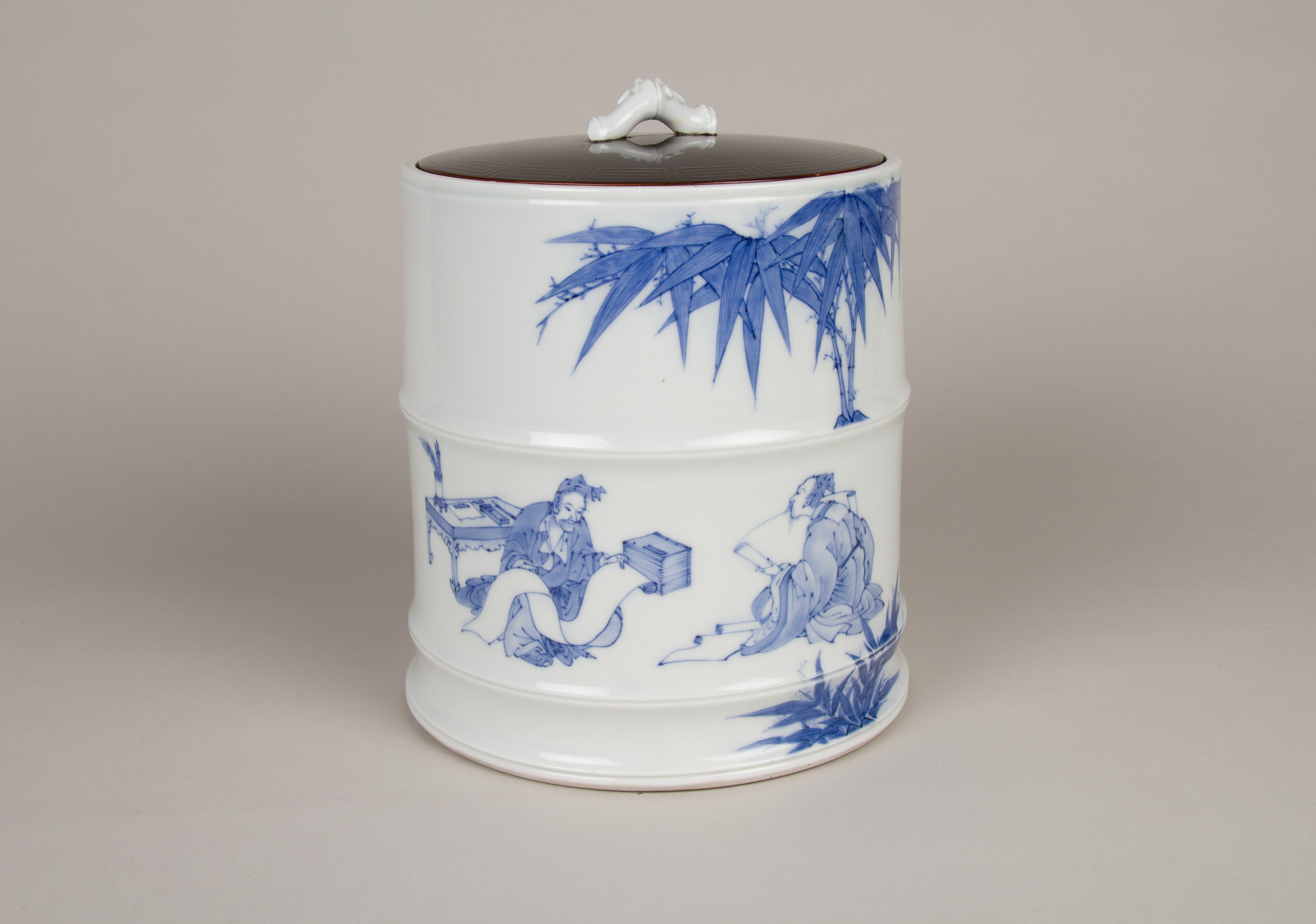
Chinese-inspired blue and white porcelain cold water jar (mizusashi), decorated with the Seven Sages of the Bamboo Grove. Hirado kilns, late 18th century. Metropolitan Museum of Art.

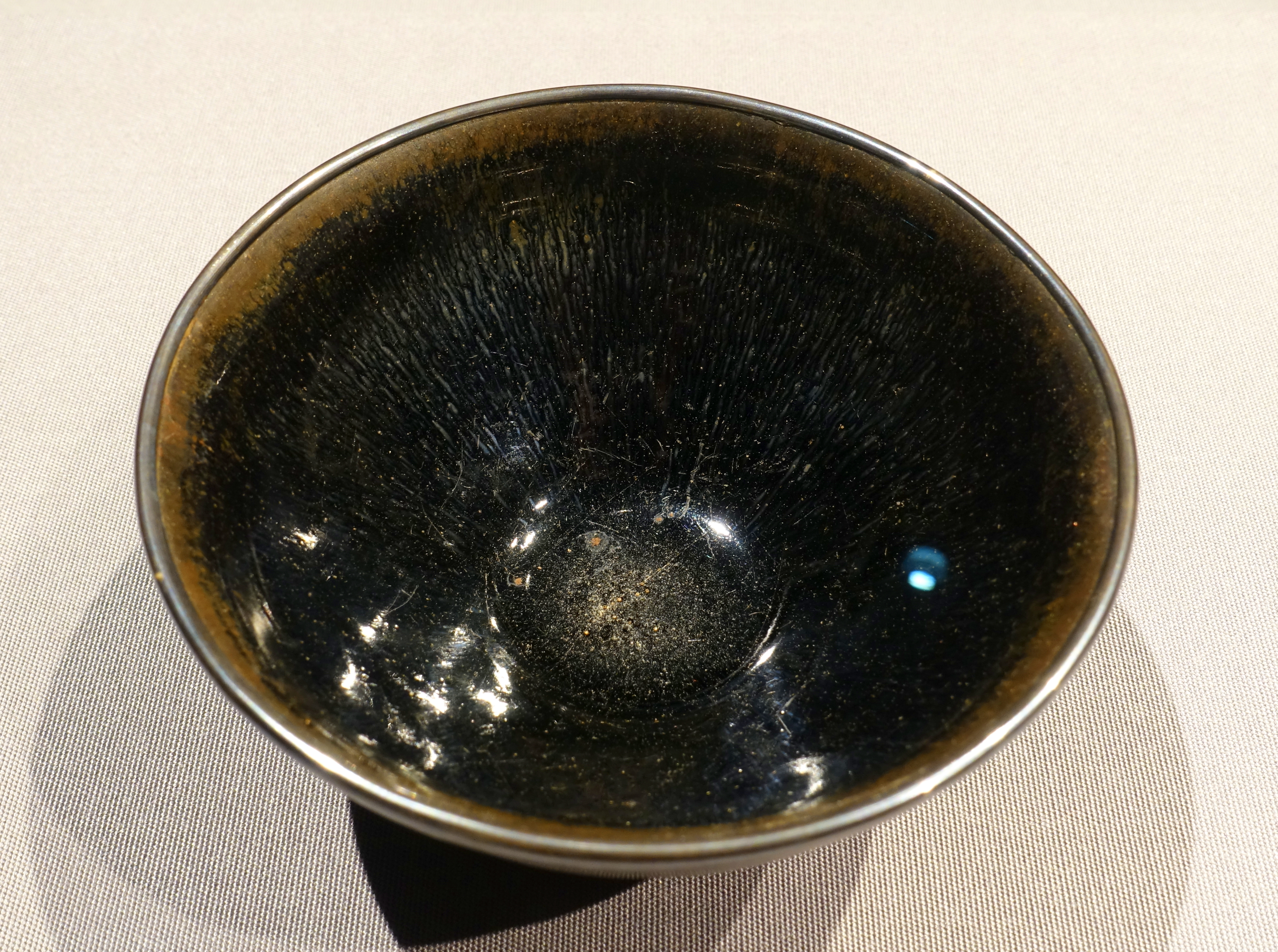
Jian bowl (tenmoku) of the "hare-fur" type from China, Song dynasty (11th century). Tokyo National Museum.

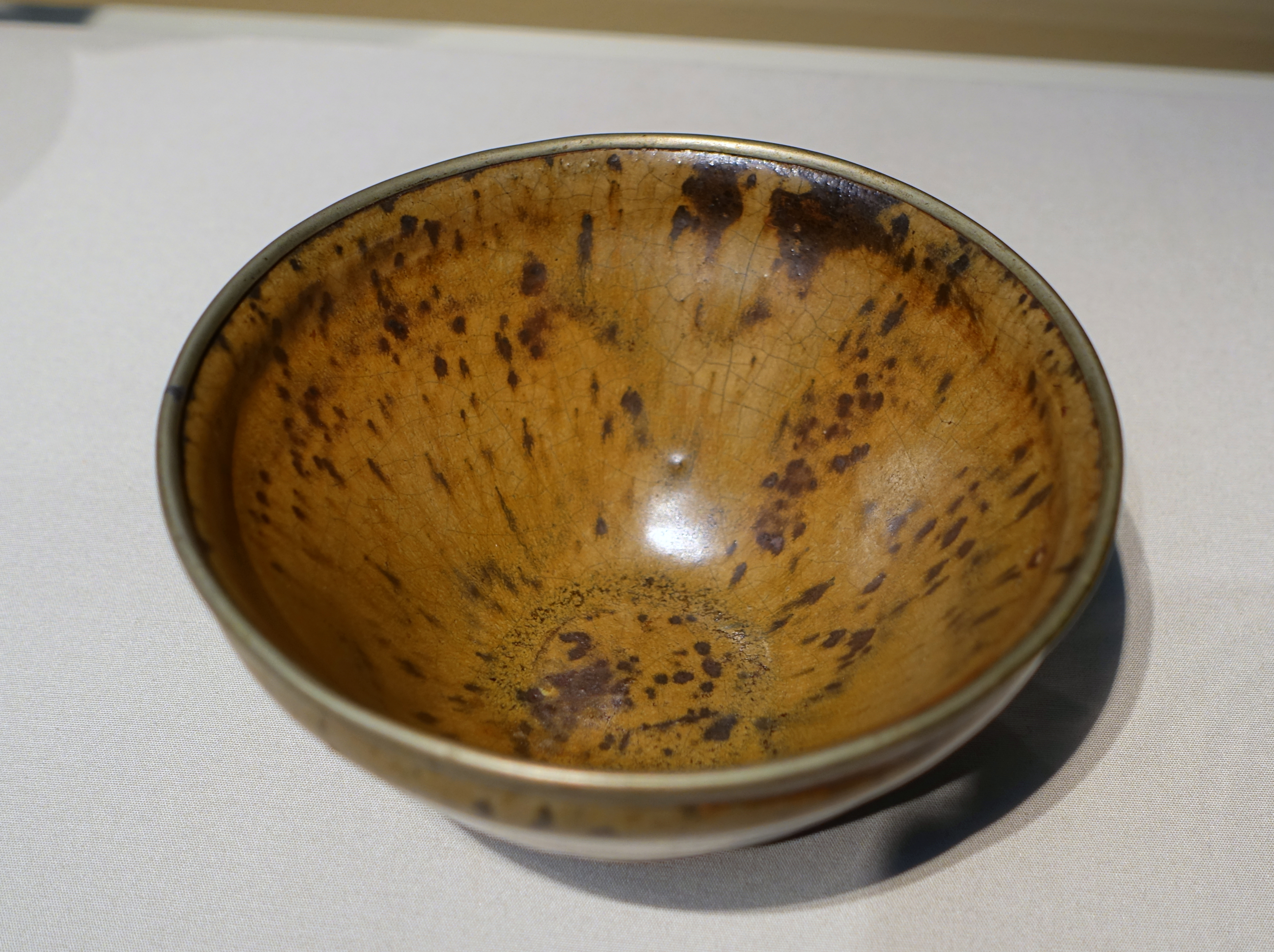
Tenmoku bowl from the Mino kilns, mid-16th century. Freer Gallery of Art.

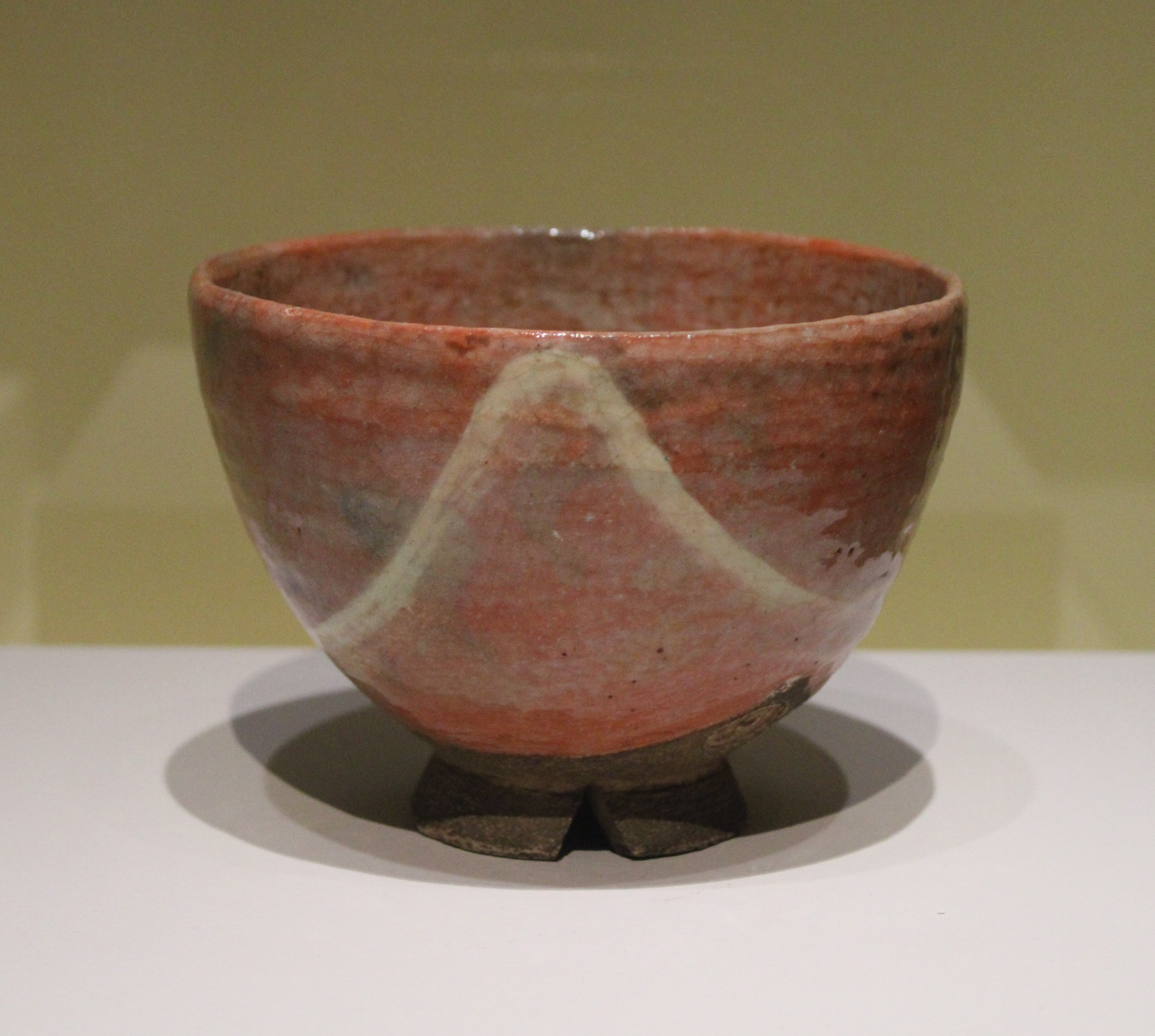
Tea cup (chawan), decorated with Mount Fuji. Edo period, c. 1811–1834). Guimet Museum.
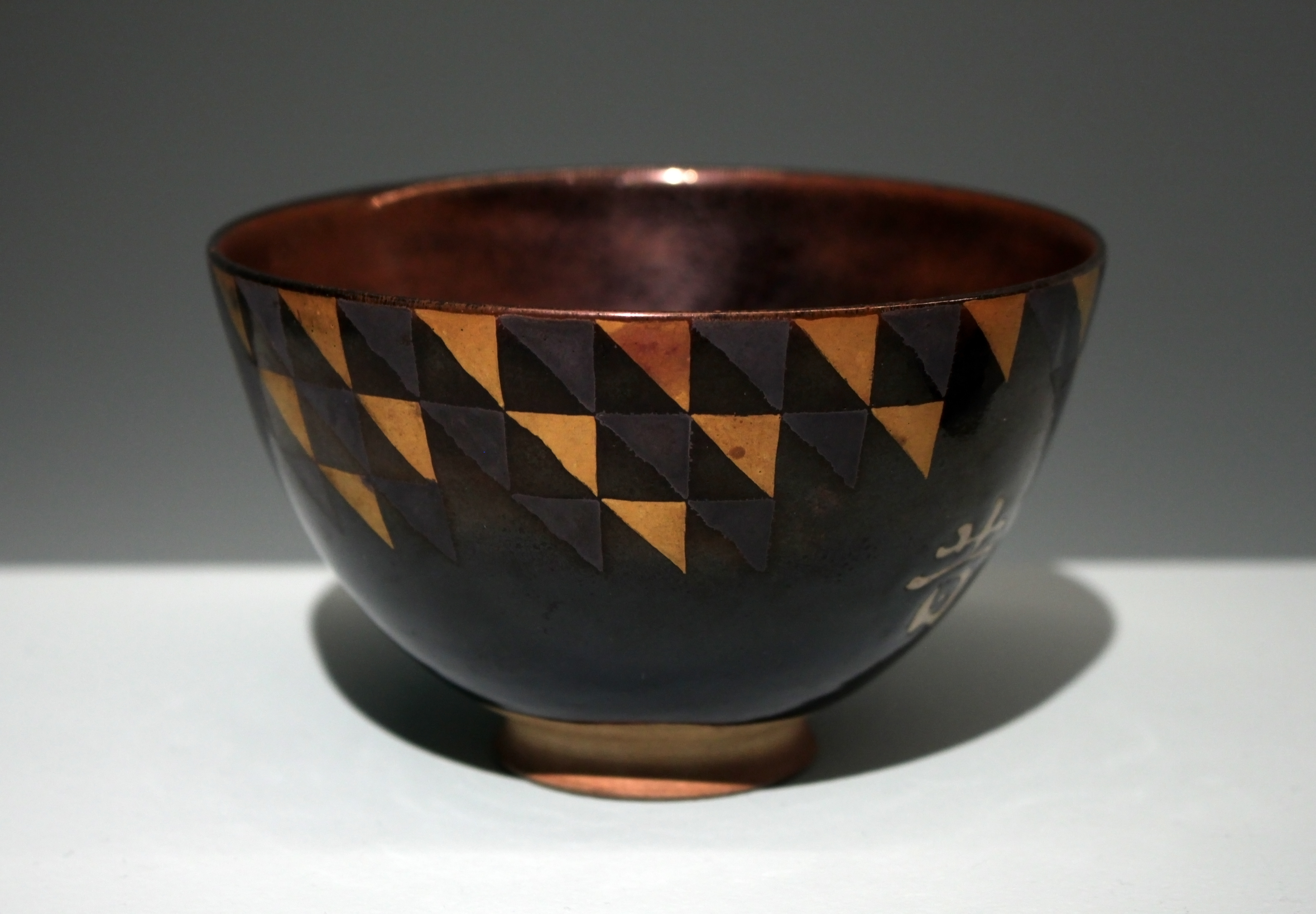
Tea cup (chawan) with stylized decoration dating from the Meiji era (1868–1912). Guimet Museum.

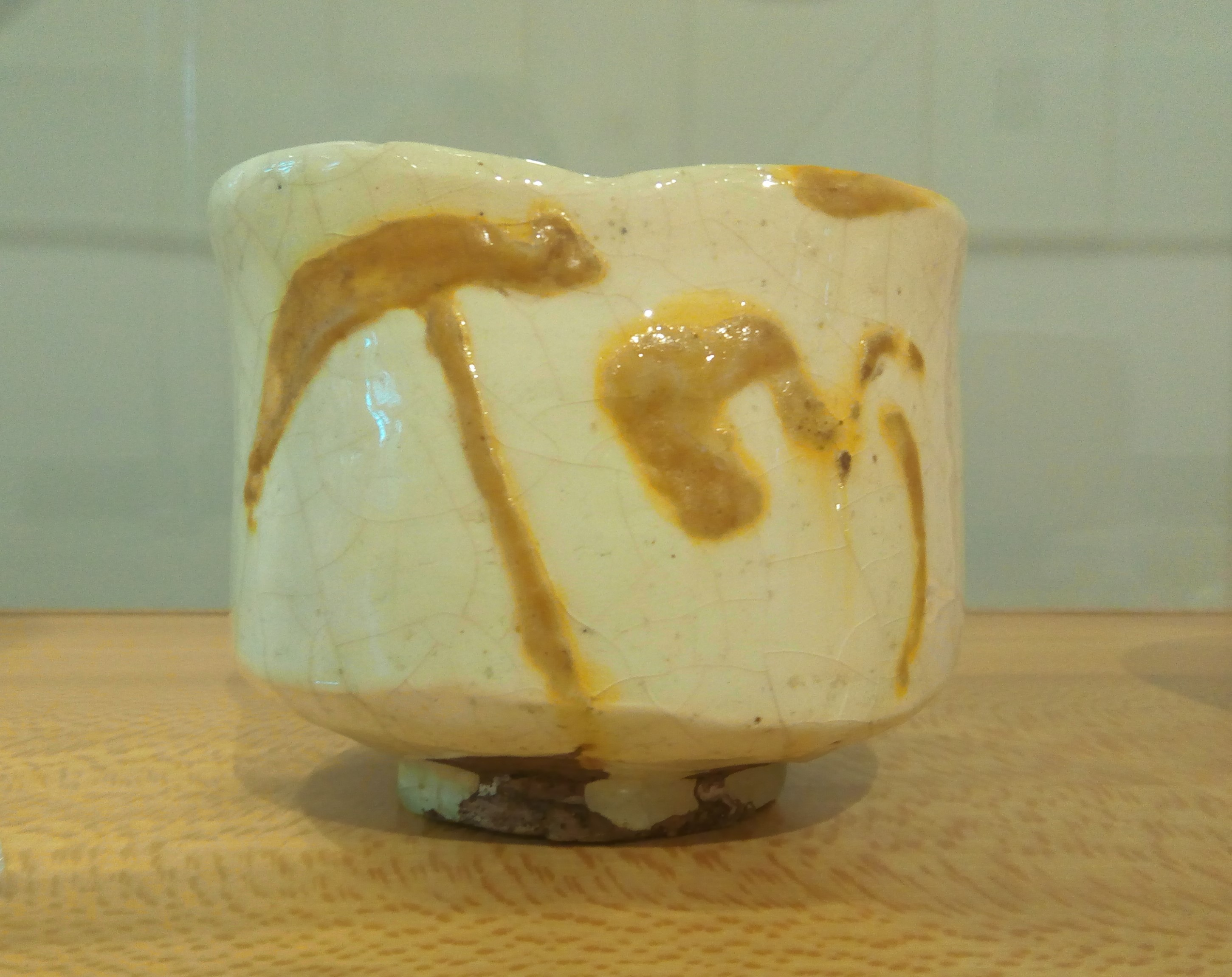
White tea cup (chawan) with brush decoration, glazed terracotta. 20th century. Georges Labit Museum.

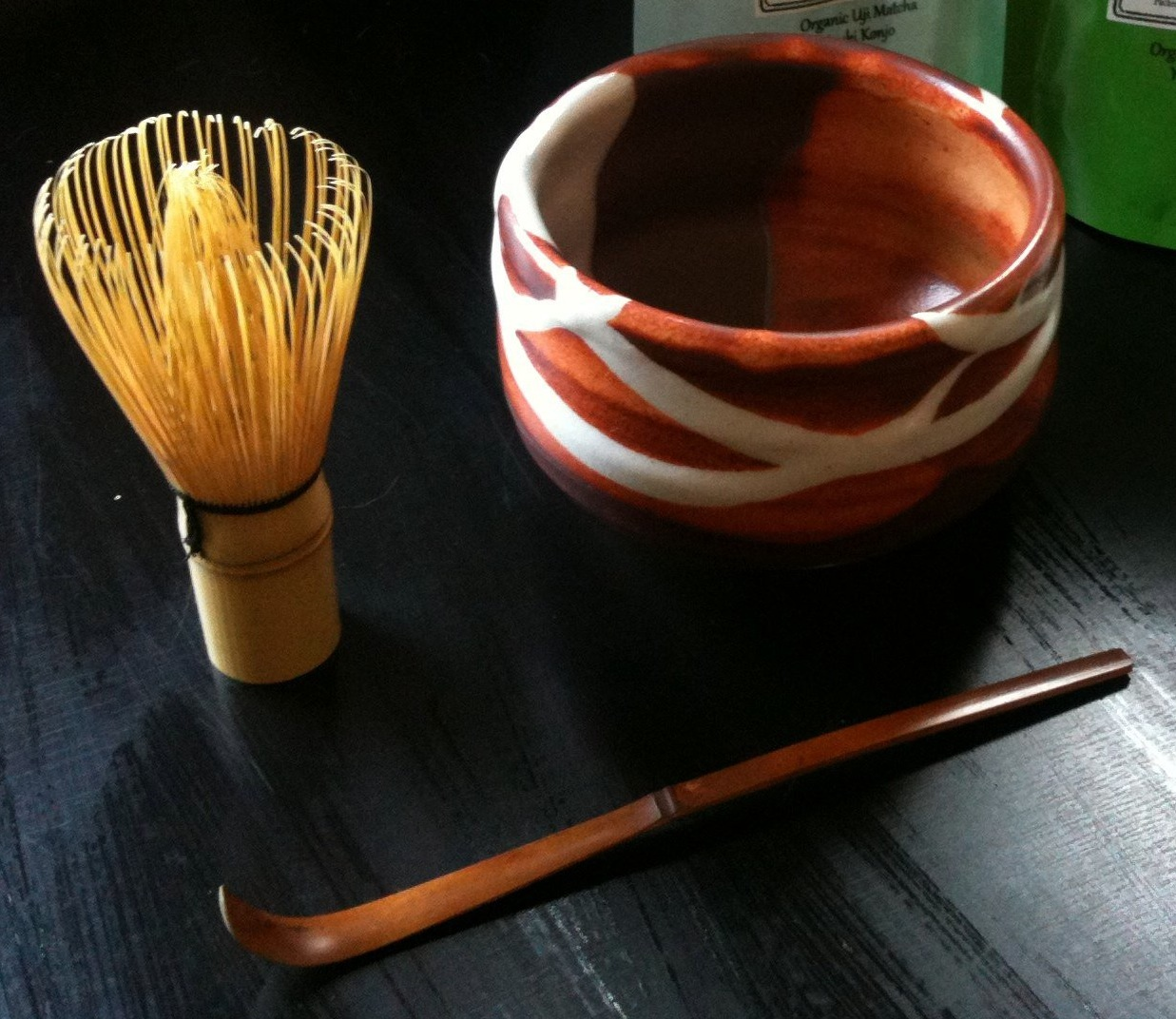
Tea cup (chawan), tea whisk (chasen) and tea spoon (chashaku) used in the tea ceremony

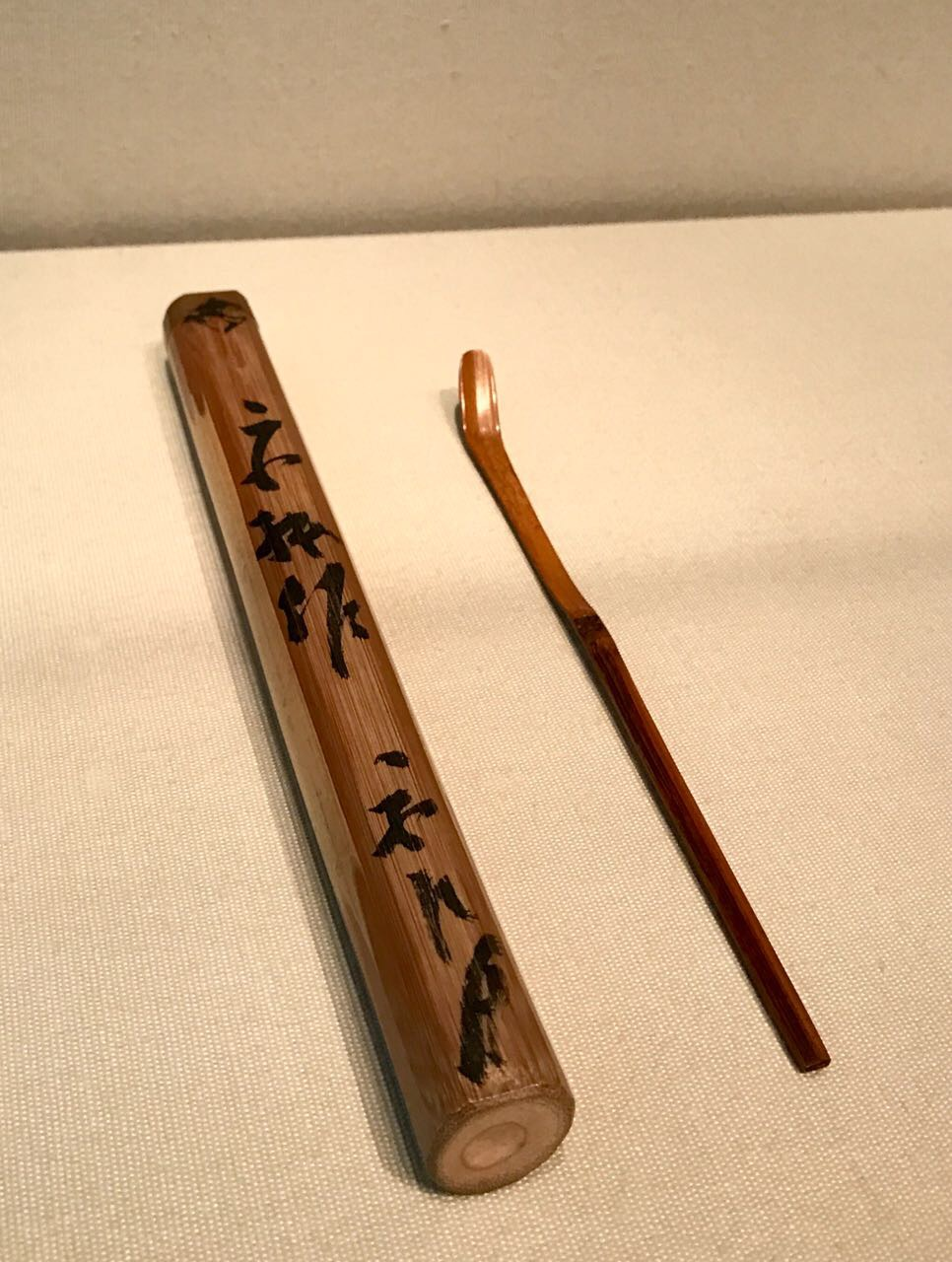
Bamboo tea spoon (chashaku) and case (tomo-zutsu), first half of the 17th century. Asian Art Museum (San Francisco).

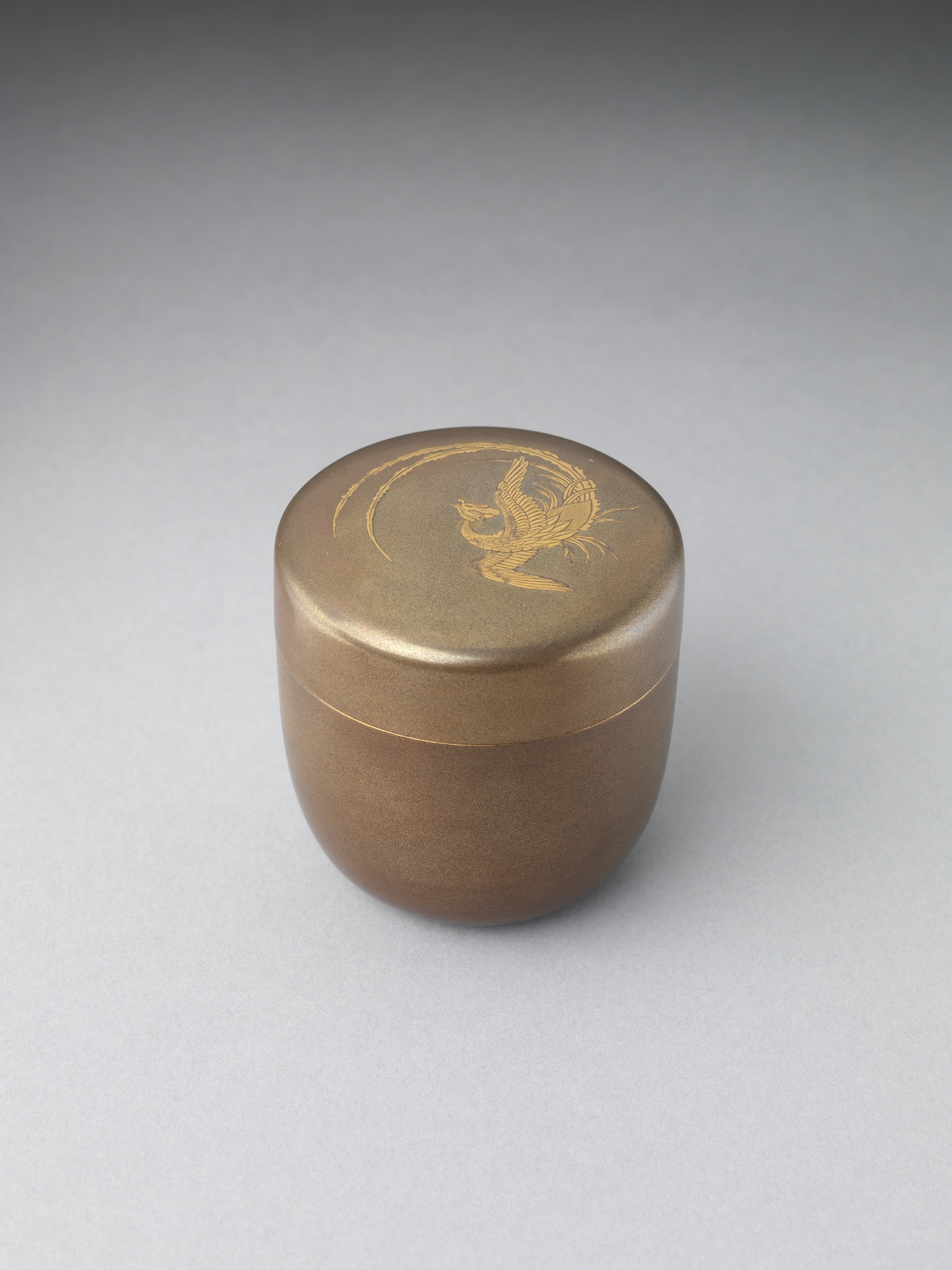
Lacquer tea box (natsume) with phoenix decoration, 19th century. Metropolitan Museum of Art.

==== New consumption trends ====
Tea consumption in Japan is constantly renewing itself with the emergence of new practices and new products.

Green tea is an increasingly popular ingredient in culinary recipes. Of course, this isn't totally new, as ochazuke, which is based on green tea poured into a bowl of rice to which other ingredients can be added, has long been a well-known recipe in Japanese cuisine. Green tea can also be used in the preparation of "dashi" broths, which serve as a base for various noodle dishes. Today, high-quality green tea can be used to create elaborate recipes, in an international context where tea-based gastronomy is on the rise in many countries.

In the realm of popular cuisine, matcha is playing an increasingly important role, to the extent that it now seems to be used more in cooking recipes than in beverages. Ice creams, pastries, and other sweet treats made with matcha have thus become very common in Japan and elsewhere, as has its use in popular drinks such as milkshakes, lattes, alcoholic and non-alcoholic cocktails, etc., all taking advantage of the fact that green tea is often promoted for its health benefits.

Matcha foods and beverages
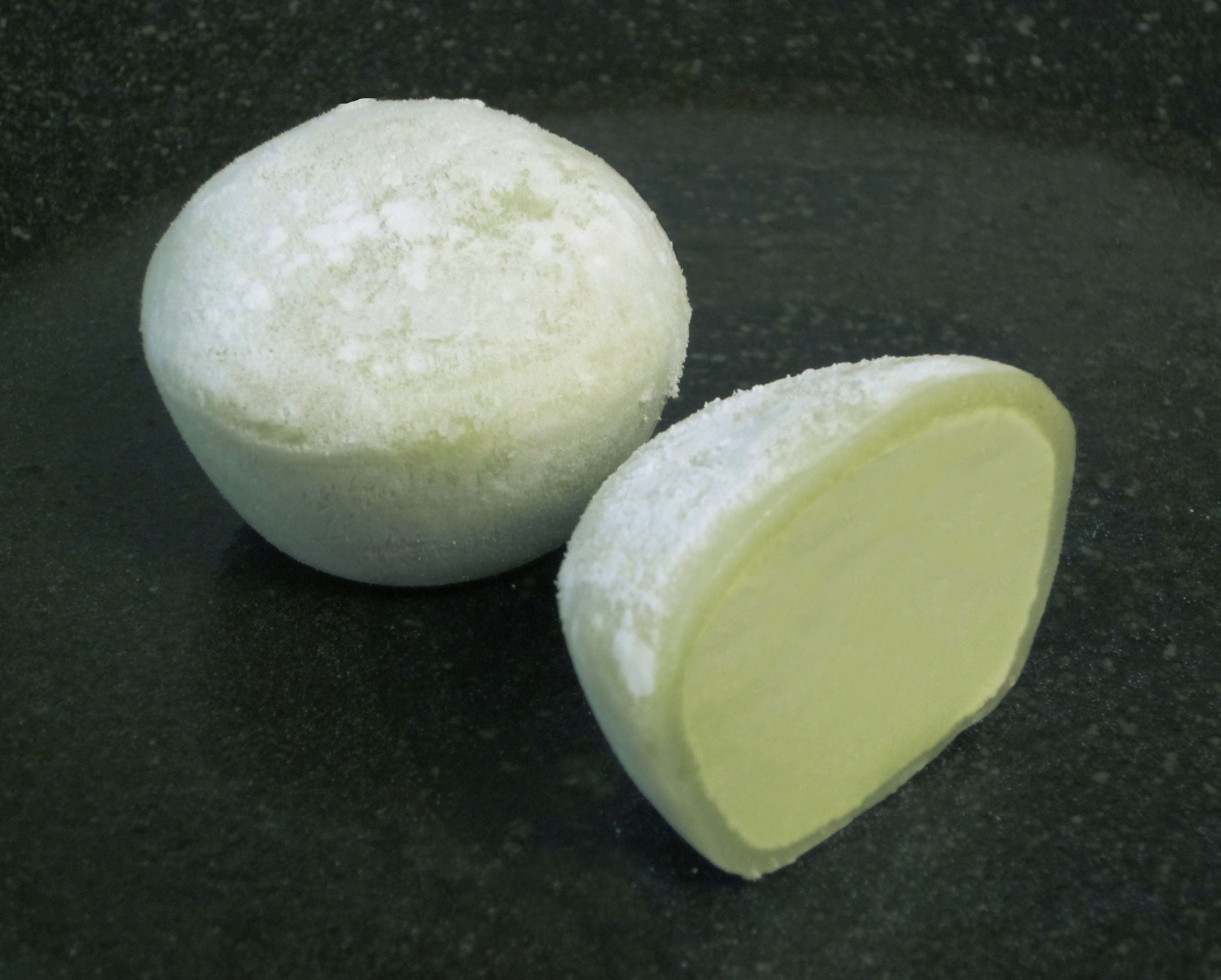
Iced matcha mochi

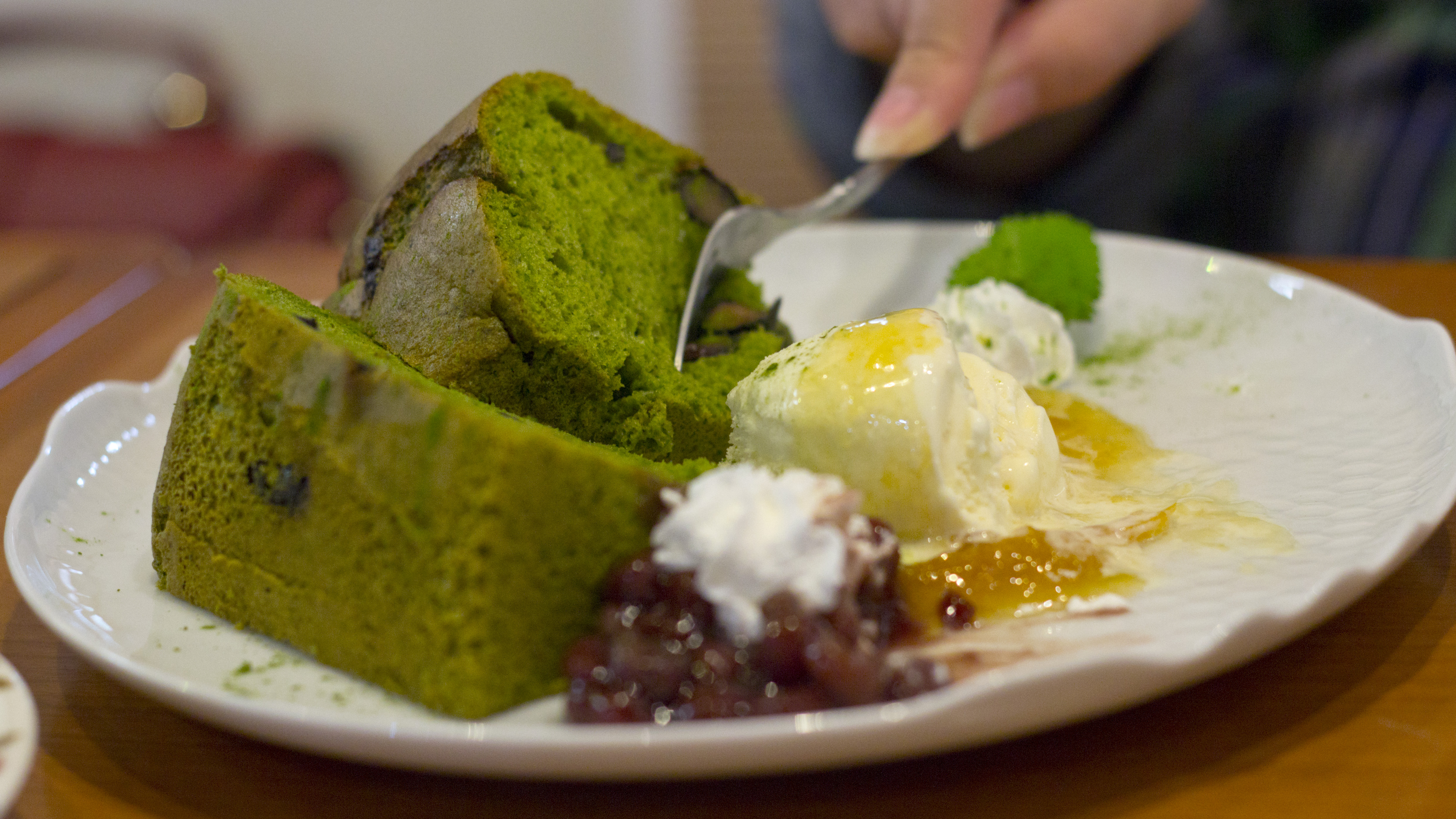
"Chiffon cake" with matcha

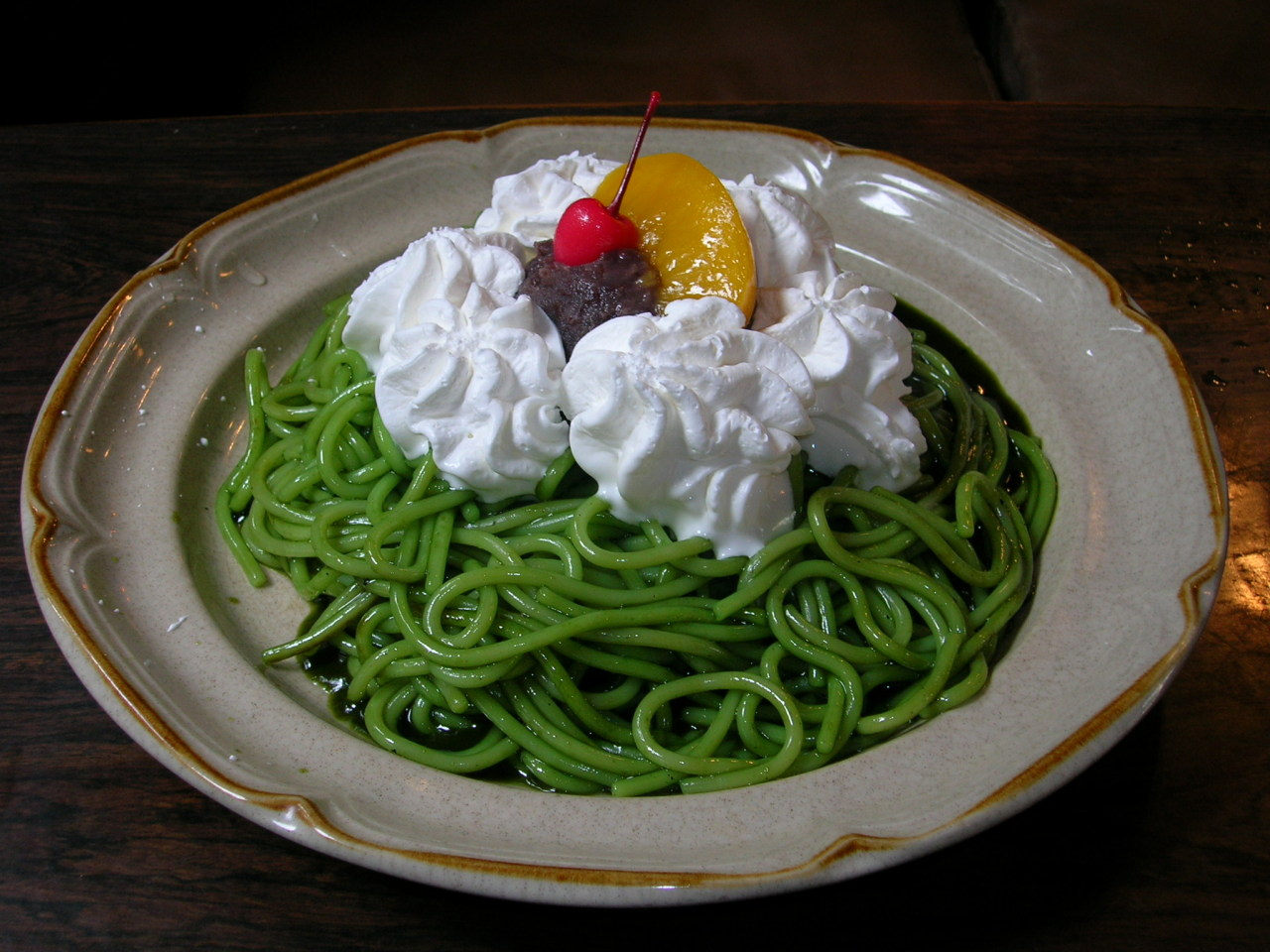
Matcha noodle dessert

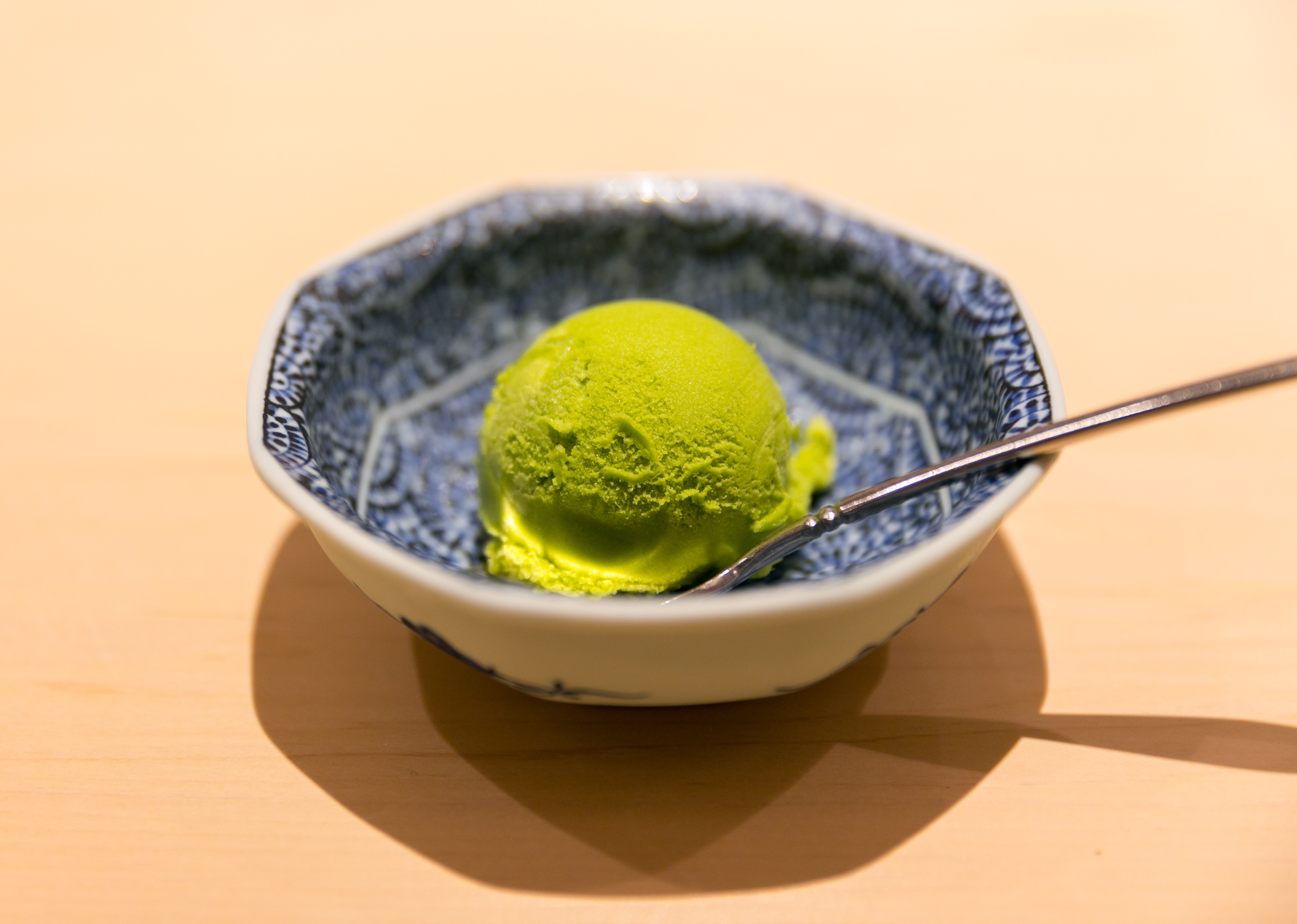
Matcha ice cream

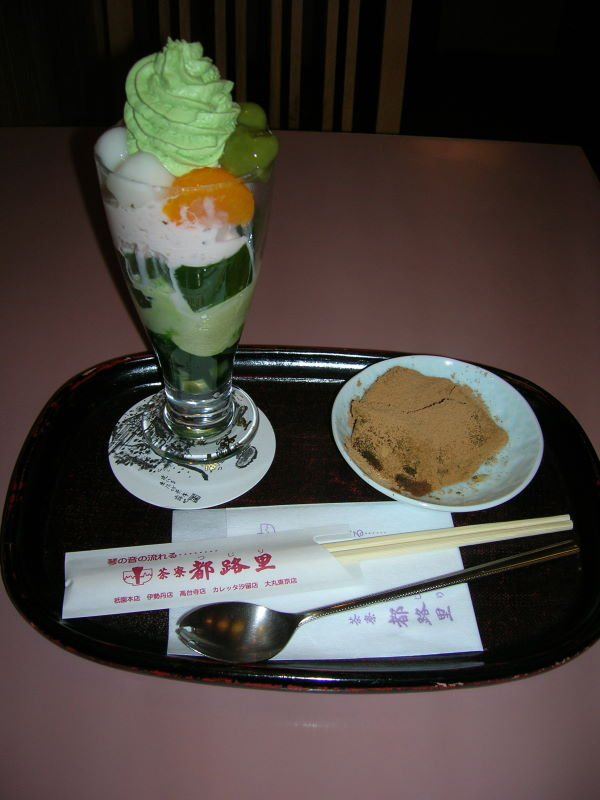
Parfait with matcha

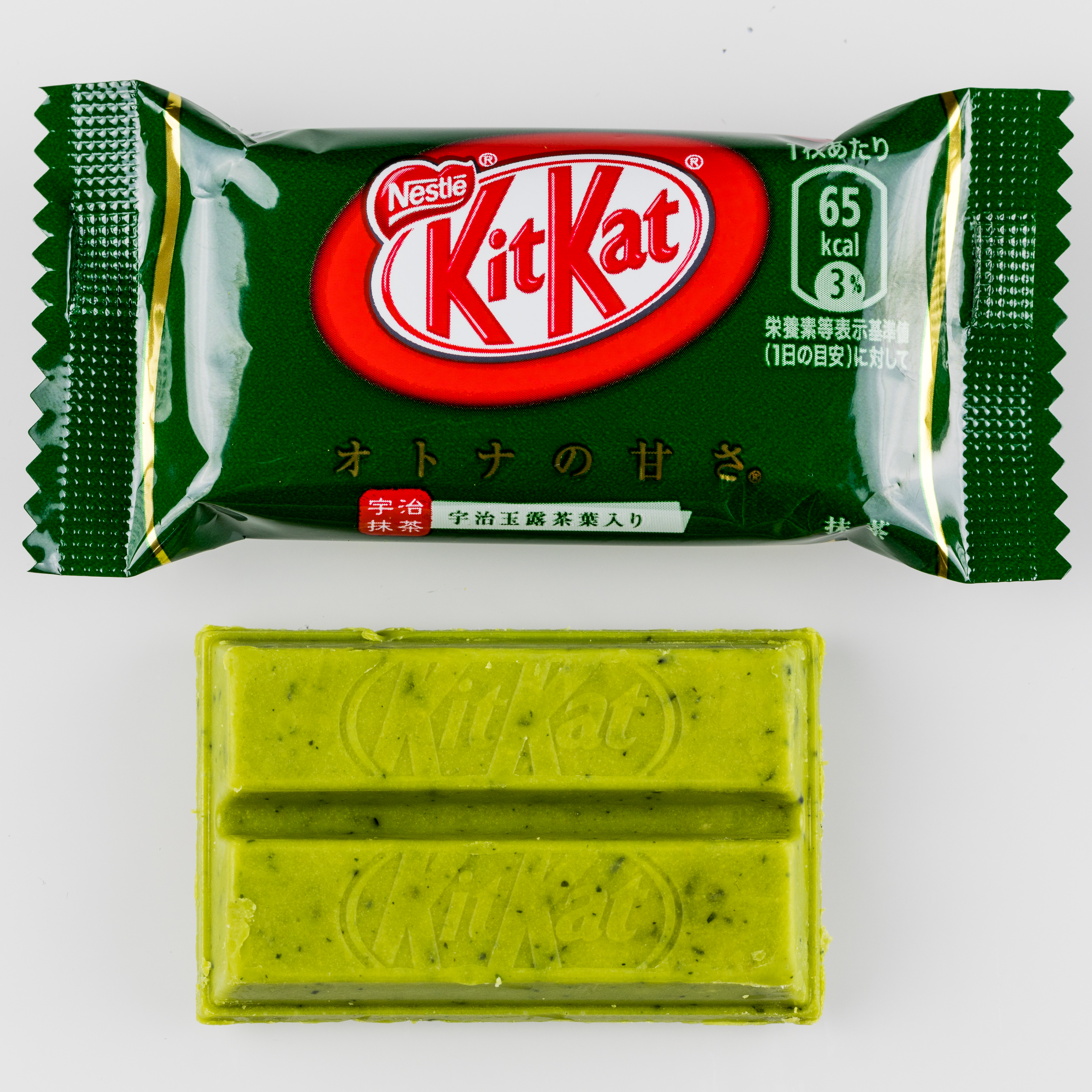
Matcha Kit Kat

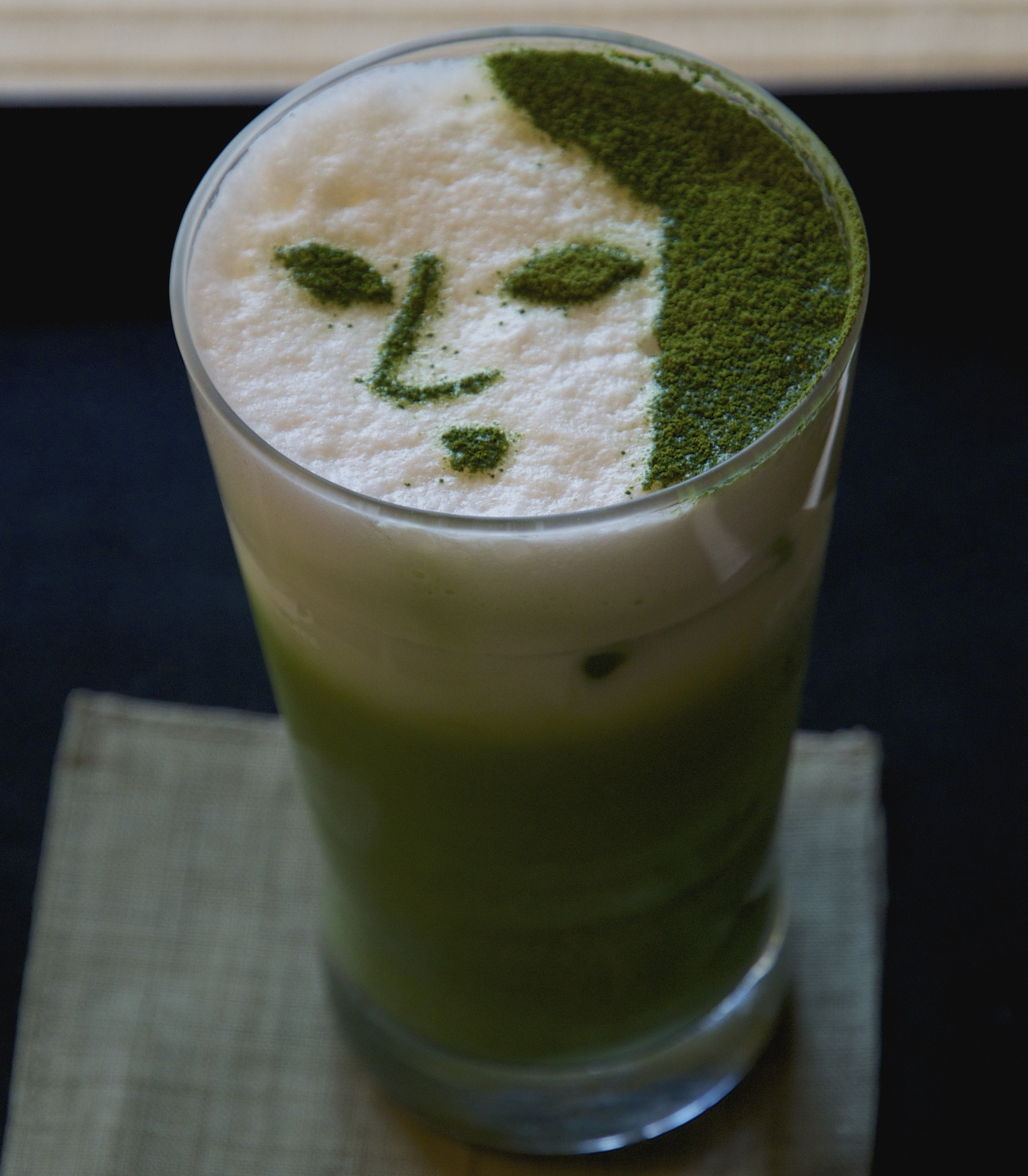
Matcha latte

Staying on the subject of beverages, Japan is no exception to 2010s tea consumption trends; producers are seeking to give a rejuvenated image to a beverage that is increasingly unpopular in the archipelago and often considered old-fashioned. As already mentioned, this country is at the cutting edge when it comes to tea drinks distributed in cans and plastic bottles. Towards the end of the 2010s, the country embraced the trend for tapioca pearl tea, or bubble tea, which originated in Taiwan and is now widespread in many countries around the world. New forms of tea consumption are being developed in Japan, such as tea spirits or teas flavored with new types of fruit, flowers, spices, and so on.

== See also ==
- Japanese tea ceremony
- History of tea in Japan

== Bibliography ==
=== General information about tea ===
- Barbaste, Christine; Delmas, François-Xavier; Minet, Mathias (2018). Le guide de dégustation de l'amateur de thé (in French). Paris: Éditions du Chêne.

=== Tea stories ===
- Saberi, Helen (2000). Tea: A Global History. Edible series. Londres: Reaktion Books. ISBN 978-1-86189-892-0.
- van Driem, George (2019). The Tale of Tea: A Comprehensive History of Tea from Prehistoric Times to the Present Day. Leyde: Brill. ISBN 978-90-04-39360-8.
- Mair, Victor; Hoh, Erling (2009). The True History of Tea. New York and London: Thames & Hudson. ISBN 978-0-500-25146-1.

=== Tea in Japan ===
- Guichard-Anguis, Sylvie (1995). Poudre et feuilles. Les Voies du thé. Flora Blanchon (ed.), Asie, savourer, goûter (in French). Paris: Presses de l'Université Paris-Sorbonne. pp. 259–268. ISBN 2-84050-049-3.
- Pitelka, Morgan (2003). Japanese Tea Culture: Art, History and Practice. London and New York: RoutledgeCurzon. ISBN 978-0-415-29687-8.
- Tanaka, Junichi (2012). Japanese Tea Breeding: History and the Future Perspective. Liang Chen, Zeno Apostolides and Zong-Mao Chen (eds.), Global Tea Breeding: Achievements, Challenges and Perspectives. Hangzhou and Berlin: Zhejiang University Press and Springer. pp. 227–239. ISBN 978-3-642-31877-1.

=== Tea ceremonies ===
- Anderson, Jennifer (1991). An Introduction to Japanese Tea Ritual. SUNY Press. ISBN 978-0-7914-0749-3.
- Varley, Paul; Elison, George (1981). The Culture of Tea: From Its Origins to Sen no Rikyū. Warlords Artists and Commoners: Japan in the Sixteenth Century. University of Hawaii Press. pp. 183–204. ISBN 978-0-8248-1109-9.
- Varley, Paul; Kumakura, Isao (1989). Tea in Japan: Essays on the History of Chanoyu. Honolulu: University of Hawaii Press. ISBN 978-0-8248-1717-6.
- Shimizu, Christine (1996). Les Arts de la Cérémonie du Thé (in French). Dijon: Editions Faton. ISBN 2-87844-035-8.
- Sen, Sōshitsu (1998). The Japanese Way of Tea: From Its Origins in China to Sen Rikyū. University of Hawaii Press. ISBN 978-0-8248-1990-3.

=== Others ===
- Ishige, Naomichi (2012). L'art culinaire au Japon (in French). Translated by Marès, Emmanuel. Nîmes: Lucie editions.
