= Tea =

Brewed beverage made from tea leaves

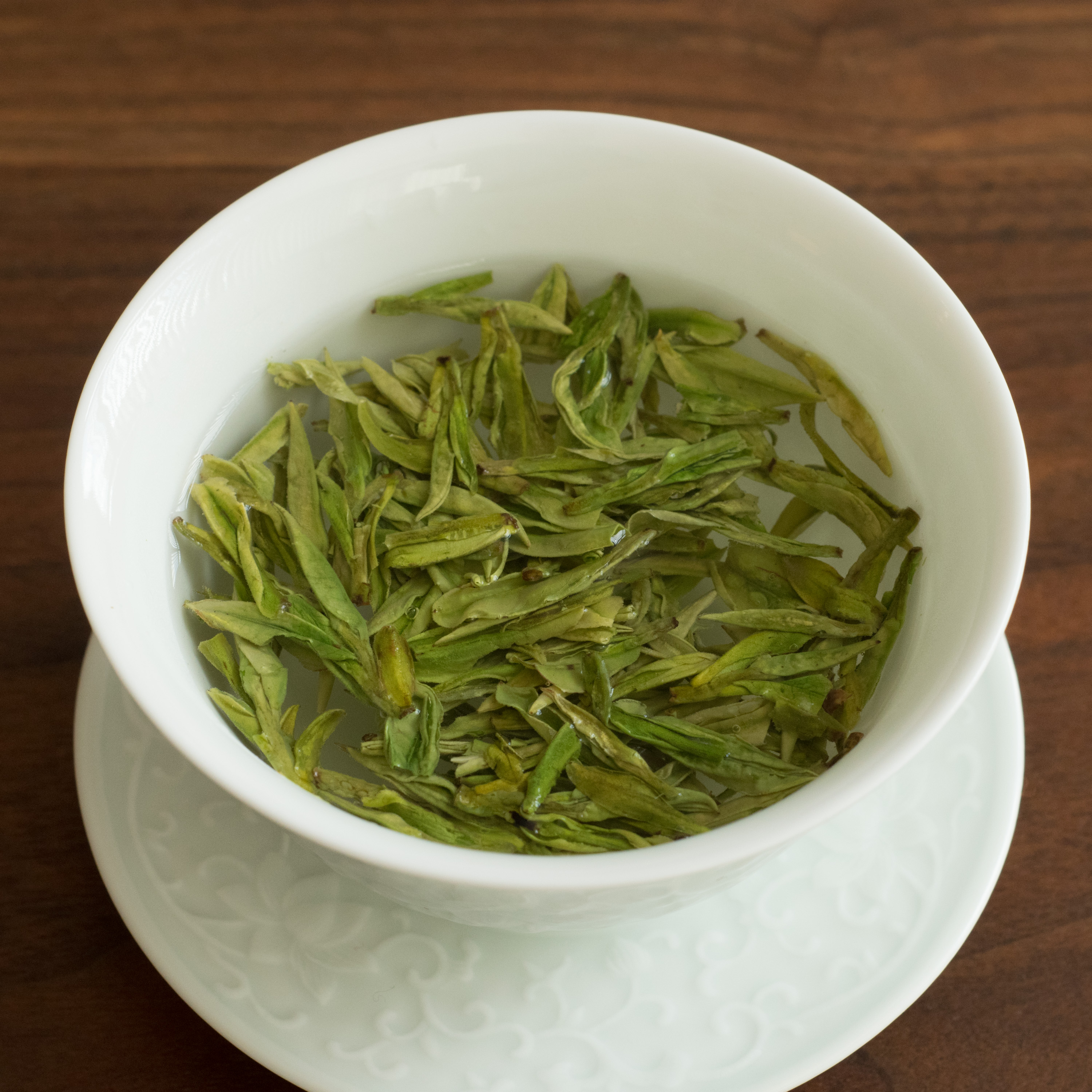
- Longjing green tea being infused in a gaiwan
- Type: Hot or cold beverage
- Origin: China
- Introduced: First recorded in China in 59 BC, possibly originated earlier

Tea is an aromatic beverage prepared by infusion of hot or boiling fresh water with fresh or cured leaves of Camellia sinensis, an evergreen shrub native to East Asia that originated in the borderlands of southwestern China, northeast India and northern Myanmar. Tea has a stimulant effect in humans primarily due to its caffeine content.

After plain drinking water, tea is the most widely consumed beverage in the world. There are many varieties of tea according to differences in cultivars, processing and blends; some have a cooling, slightly bitter and astringent flavor, while others have taste profiles that include sweet, nutty, floral or grassy notes.

Traditionally, tea is made by steeping loose tea leaves in hot water (usually in a teapot or teacup) for a period of time, or in the case of compressed and fermented tea, via decoction (simmering) in a kettle. Convenient preparations, such as tea bag, infuser and press as well as powdered instant tea such as matcha, konacha and chai latte, are also common. Tea is most commonly consumed as a hot beverage in a plain hot water infusion, although it can also be in mixed drink forms, such as milk tea and butter tea, sometimes sweetened with added sugar or sugar substitutes, or alternatively flavored with salt and spices. In modern times, tea can also be served as a cold beverage in the form of iced tea or in soft drink mixtures such as bubble tea.

Early credible record of tea drinking dates to the 3rd century AD, in a Chinese medical text written by Eastern Han dynasty physician Hua Tuo. Tea was consumed as a recreational and social beverage during the Tang dynasty, and Chinese tea culture-inspired ceremonial drinking spread to other Sinospheric countries such as Japan (where it is known as chado), Korea (known as darye) and Vietnam (typically as part of a wedding ritual). Tea drinking also spread into Inner Asia and South Asia via the Silk Road and the Tea Horse Road, particularly during the expansion of the Mongols, for whom the salted milk tea (süütei tsai) has remained part of the staple diet. Outside of the Far East, Portuguese priests and merchants introduced tea drinking to Europe during the 16th century. During the 17th century, drinking tea became fashionable in Western Europe as part of the rise of Chinoiserie influence, especially among the British, who had such a high import demand of tea that they later started to cultivate tea on a large scale in colonial India and Ceylon, where tea had previously been used only as a herbal medicine.

== Etymology ==
The etymology of the various words for tea reflects the history of transmission of tea drinking and trade from China. Nearly all of the words for tea worldwide fall into three broad groups: te, cha and chai, present in English as tea, cha or char, and chai. The earliest of the three to enter English is cha, which came in the 1590s via the Portuguese, who traded in Macao and picked up the Cantonese pronunciation of the word. The more common tea form arrived in the 17th century via the Dutch, who acquired it via trades from their colonial empire either indirectly from the Malay teh, or directly from the tê pronunciation in Min Chinese. The third form chai (meaning "spiced tea") originated from a northern Chinese pronunciation of cha, which travelled via the overland Silk Road to Central Asia and Persia, where it picked up a Persian ending yi. The Chinese word for tea itself was perhaps derived from the non-Sinitic languages of the botanical homeland of the tea plant in southwest China and northeastern Burma (modern-day Kachin and Shan), possibly from an archaic Austro-Asiatic root word *la, meaning "leaf".

== Origin and history ==
=== Botanical origin ===
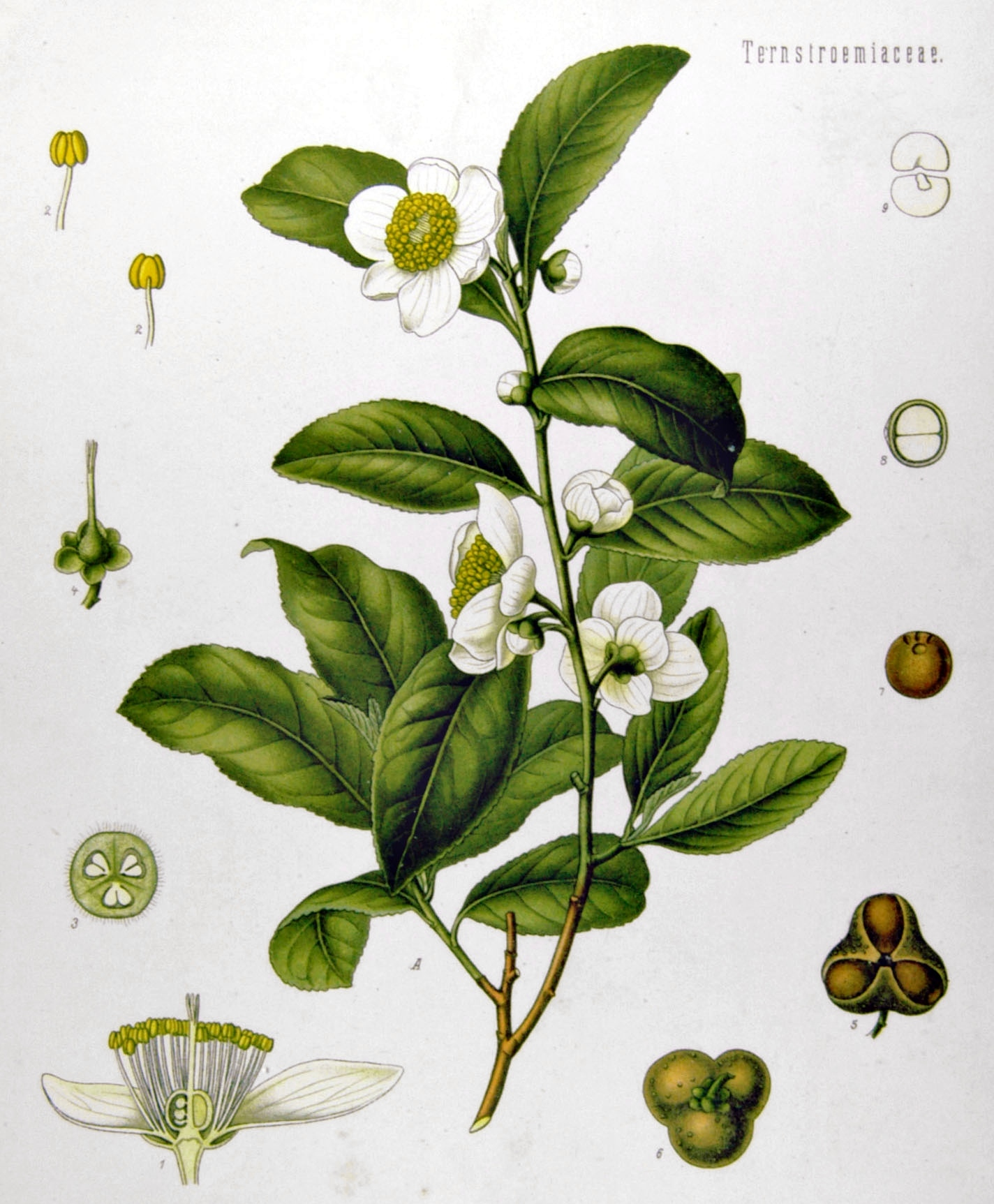
Tea plant (Camellia sinensis) from Köhler's Medicinal Plants, 1897

Tea plants are native to East Asia and the probable centre of origin of tea is near the source of the Irrawaddy River from where it spread out fan-wise into southeast China, Indo-China and Assam. The natural home of the tea plant is considered to be within the comparatively small fan-shaped area between Nagaland, Manipur and Mizoram along the Burma frontier in the west, through China as far as the Zhejiang Province in the east, and from this line generally south through the hills to Burma and Thailand to Vietnam. The west–east axis indicated above is about 2,400 km long extending from longitude 95°-120°E. The north–south axis covers about 1,920 km, starting from the northern part of Burma, latitude 29°N passing through Yunnan, Tongkin, Thailand, Laos and on to Annan, reaching latitude 11°N.

Chinese (small-leaf) type tea (C. sinensis var. sinensis) may have originated in southern China possibly with hybridization of unknown wild tea relatives. Since there are no known wild populations of this tea, its origin is speculative.

Given their genetic differences forming distinct clades, Chinese Assam-type tea (C. sinensis var. assamica) may have two parentages – one being found in southern Yunnan (Xishuangbanna, Pu'er City) and the other in western Yunnan (Lincang, Baoshan). Many types of Southern Yunnan Assam tea have been hybridized with the closely related species Camellia taliensis. Unlike Southern Yunnan Assam tea, Western Yunnan Assam tea shares many genetic similarities with Indian Assam-type tea (also C. sinensis var. assamica). Thus, Western Yunnan Assam tea and Indian Assam tea both may have originated from the same parent plant in the area where southwestern China, Indo-Burma, and Tibet meet. However, as the Indian Assam tea shares no haplotypes with Western Yunnan Assam tea, Indian Assam tea is likely to have originated from an independent domestication. Some Indian Assam tea appears to have hybridized with the species Camellia pubicosta.

Assuming a generation of 12 years, Chinese small-leaf tea is estimated to have diverged from Assam tea around 22,000 years ago, while Chinese Assam tea and Indian Assam tea diverged 2,800 years ago. The divergence of Chinese small-leaf tea and Assam tea would correspond to the last glacial maximum.

=== Early tea drinking ===
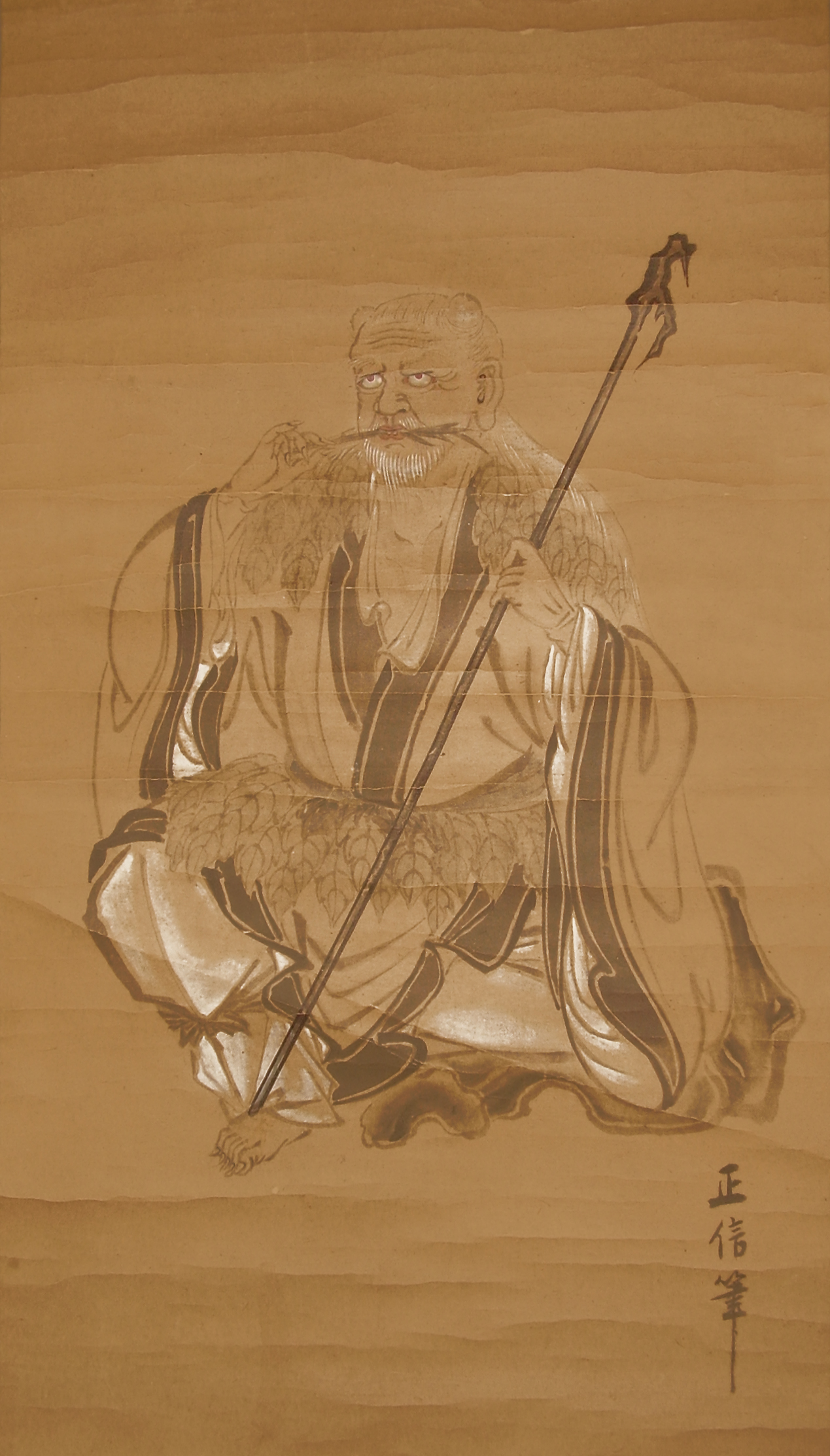
A 19th-century Japanese painting depicting Shennong: Chinese legends credit Shennong with the invention of tea.

People in ancient East Asia ate tea for centuries, perhaps even millennia, before ever consuming it as a beverage. They would nibble on the leaves raw, add them to soups or greens, or ferment them and chew them as areca nut is chewed.

Tea drinking may have begun in the region of Yunnan, where it was used for medicinal purposes. It is believed that in Sichuan, "people began to boil tea leaves for consumption into a concentrated liquid without the addition of other leaves or herbs, thereby using tea as a bitter yet stimulating drink, rather than as a medicinal concoction."

Chinese legends attribute the invention of tea to the mythical Shennong (in central and northern China) in 2737 BC, although evidence suggests that tea drinking may have been introduced from southwest China. The earliest written records of tea come from China. The word tú 荼 appears in the Shijing and other ancient texts to signify a kind of "bitter vegetable" (苦菜), and it is possible that it referred to many different plants such as sow thistle, chicory, or smartweed, as well as tea. In the Chronicles of Huayang, it was recorded that the Ba people in Sichuan presented tu to the Zhou king. The Qin later conquered the state of Ba and its neighbour Shu, and according to the 17th-century scholar Gu Yanwu who wrote in Ri Zhi Lu (日知錄): "It was after the Qin had taken Shu that they learned how to drink tea." Another possible early reference to tea is found in a letter written by the Qin dynasty general Liu Kun who requested that some "real tea" to be sent to him.

The earliest known physical evidence of tea was discovered in 2016 in the mausoleum of Emperor Jing of Han in Xi'an, indicating that tea from the genus Camellia was drunk by Han dynasty emperors as early as the second century BC. The Han dynasty work "The Contract for a Youth", written by Wang Bao in 59 BC, contains the first known reference to boiling tea. Among the tasks listed to be undertaken by the youth, the contract states that "he shall boil tea and fill the utensils" and "he shall buy tea at Wuyang". The first record of tea cultivation is dated to this period, during which tea was cultivated on Meng Mountain (蒙山) near Chengdu. Another early credible record of tea drinking dates to the 3rd century AD, in a medical text by the Chinese physician Hua Tuo, who stated, "to drink bitter t'u constantly makes one think better." However, before the Tang dynasty, tea-drinking was primarily a southern Chinese practice centered in Jiankang. Tea was disdained by the Northern dynasties aristocrats, who describe it as inferior to yogurt. It became widely consumed during the Tang dynasty, when it spread to Korea, Japan, and Vietnam. The Classic of Tea, a treatise on tea and its preparations, was written by the 8th century Chinese writer, Lu Yu. The current Chinese word for tea (茶) appeared in The Classic of Tea by removing a stroke from the word tu. Lu was known to have influenced tea drinking on a large part in China.

=== Developments ===
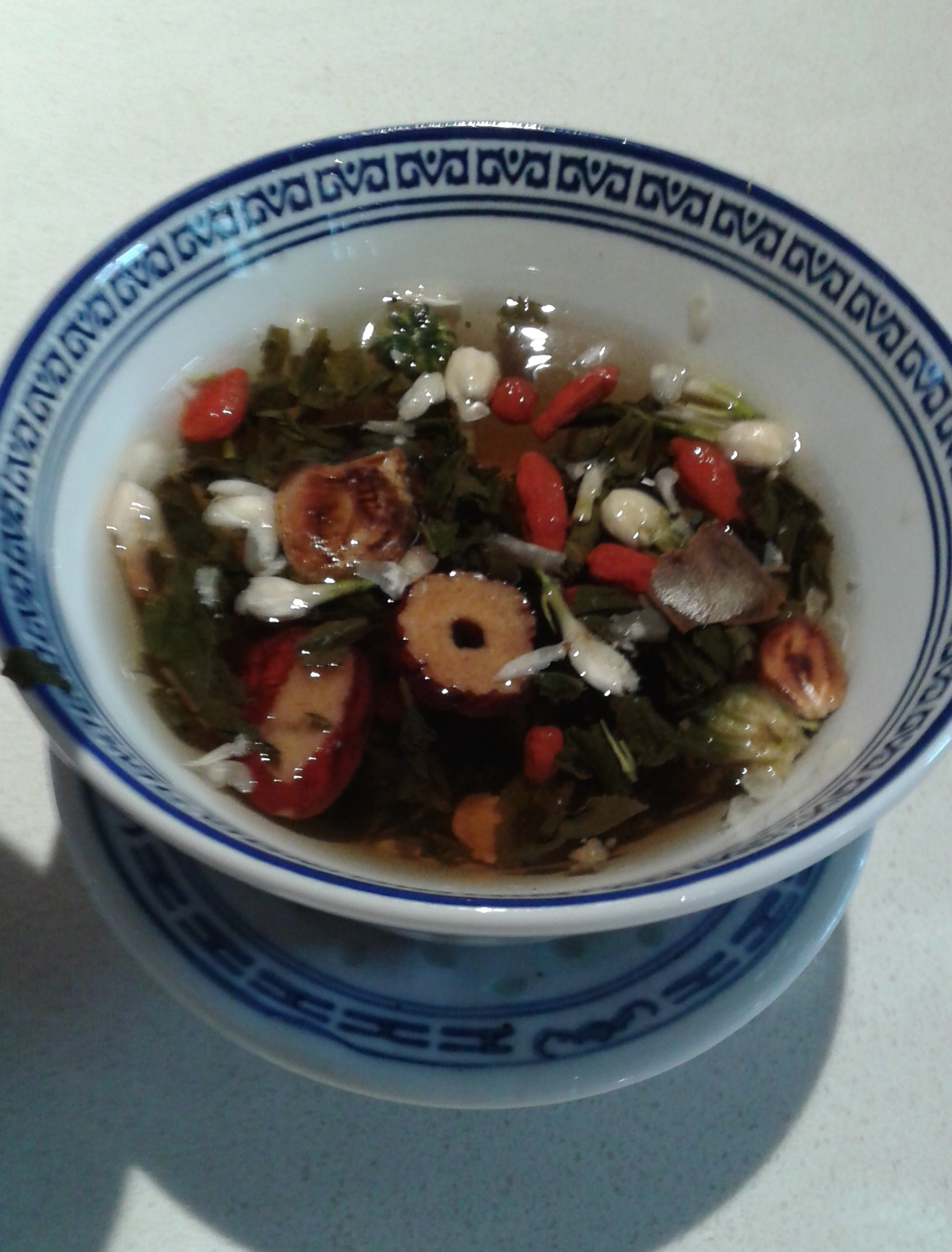
Tea with ingredients, China

Through the centuries, a variety of techniques for processing tea, and a number of different forms of tea, were developed. During the Han and Six Dynasties, tea was steamed and pounded, shaped into cake form, slowly dried over low fire, and suspended to air dry. Chunks of tea were then boiled to drink, flavoured with orange peels, jujube, mint, ginger or scallion. Tea was similarly prepared in cake form during the Tang dynasty, but Lu Yu disparaged the use of various condiments to flavour the tea apart from salt. By the Song dynasty, loose-leaf tea was developed and became common. During the Yuan and Ming dynasties, unoxidized tea leaves were first stirred in a hot dry pan, then rolled and air-dried, a process that stops the oxidation process that would have turned the leaves dark, thereby allowing tea to remain green. In the 15th century, oolong tea, in which the leaves are allowed to partially oxidize before being heated in the pan, was developed. Western tastes, however, favoured the fully oxidized black tea, and the leaves were allowed to oxidize further. Yellow tea was an accidental discovery in the production of green tea during the Ming dynasty, when apparently careless practices allowed the leaves to turn yellow, which yielded a different flavour.

=== Worldwide spread ===
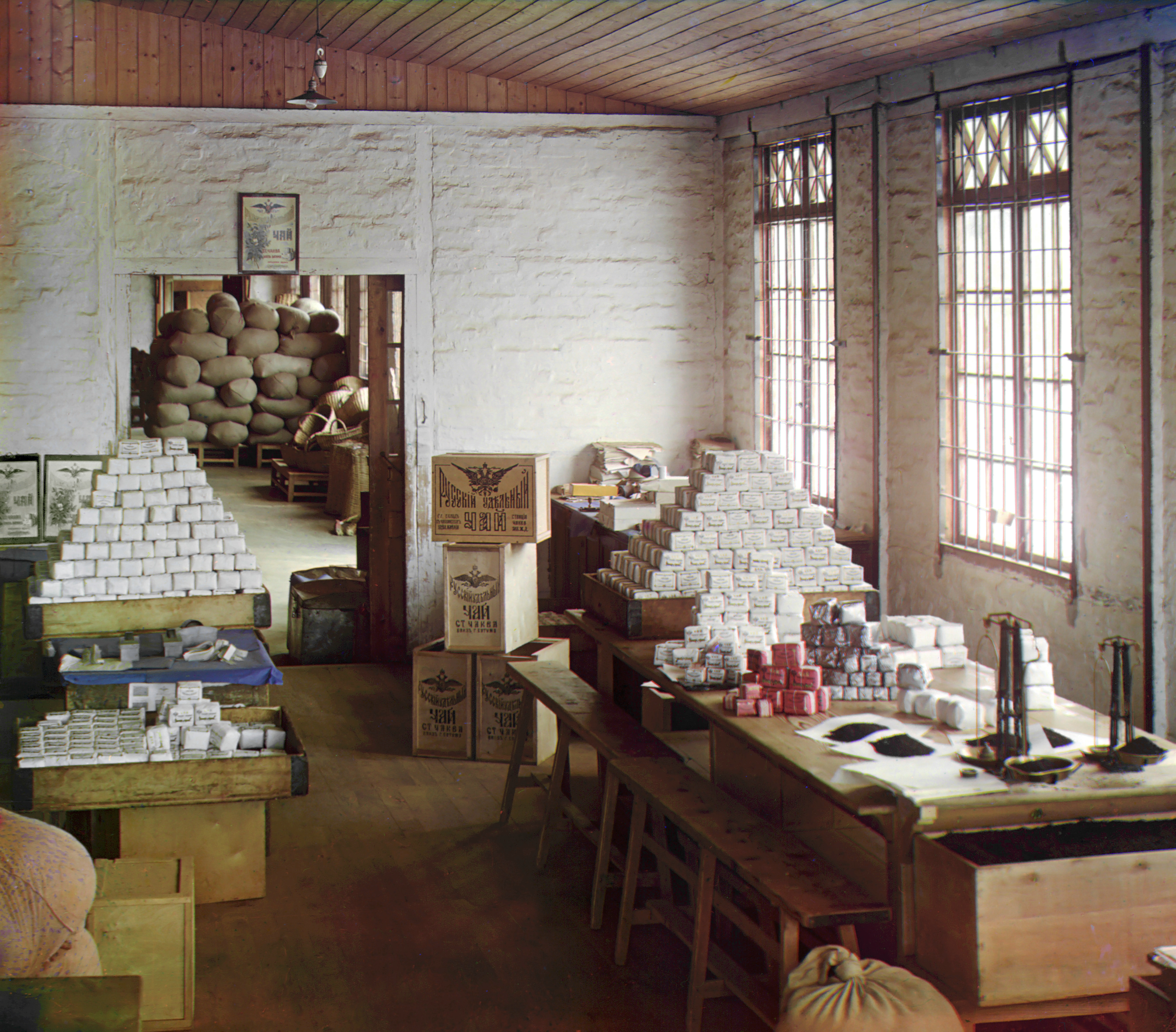
Tea-weighing station north of Batumi, Russian Empire, before 1915

Tea was first introduced to Western priests and merchants in China during the 16th century, at which time it was termed chá. The earliest European reference to tea, written as chiai, came from Delle navigationi e viaggi written by Venetian Giambattista Ramusio in 1545. The first recorded shipment of tea by a European nation was in 1607 when the Dutch East India Company moved a cargo of tea from Macao to Java, then two years later, the Dutch bought the first assignment of tea which was from Hirado in Japan to be shipped to Europe. Tea became a fashionable drink in The Hague in the Netherlands, and the Dutch introduced the drink to Germany, France, and across the Atlantic to New Amsterdam (New York).

In 1567, Russian people came in contact with tea when Cossack leaders (atamans) Petrov and Yalyshev visited China. The Mongolian Khan donated to Tsar Michael I four poods (65–70 kg) of tea in 1638. According to Jeremiah Curtin, it was possibly in 1636 that Vassili Starkov was sent as envoy to the Altyn Khan. He was given 250 pounds of tea as a gift to the tsar. Starkov at first refused, seeing no use for a load of dead leaves, but the Khan insisted. Thus was tea introduced to Russia. In 1679, Russia concluded a treaty on regular tea supplies from China via camel caravan in exchange for furs. It is today considered the de facto national beverage.

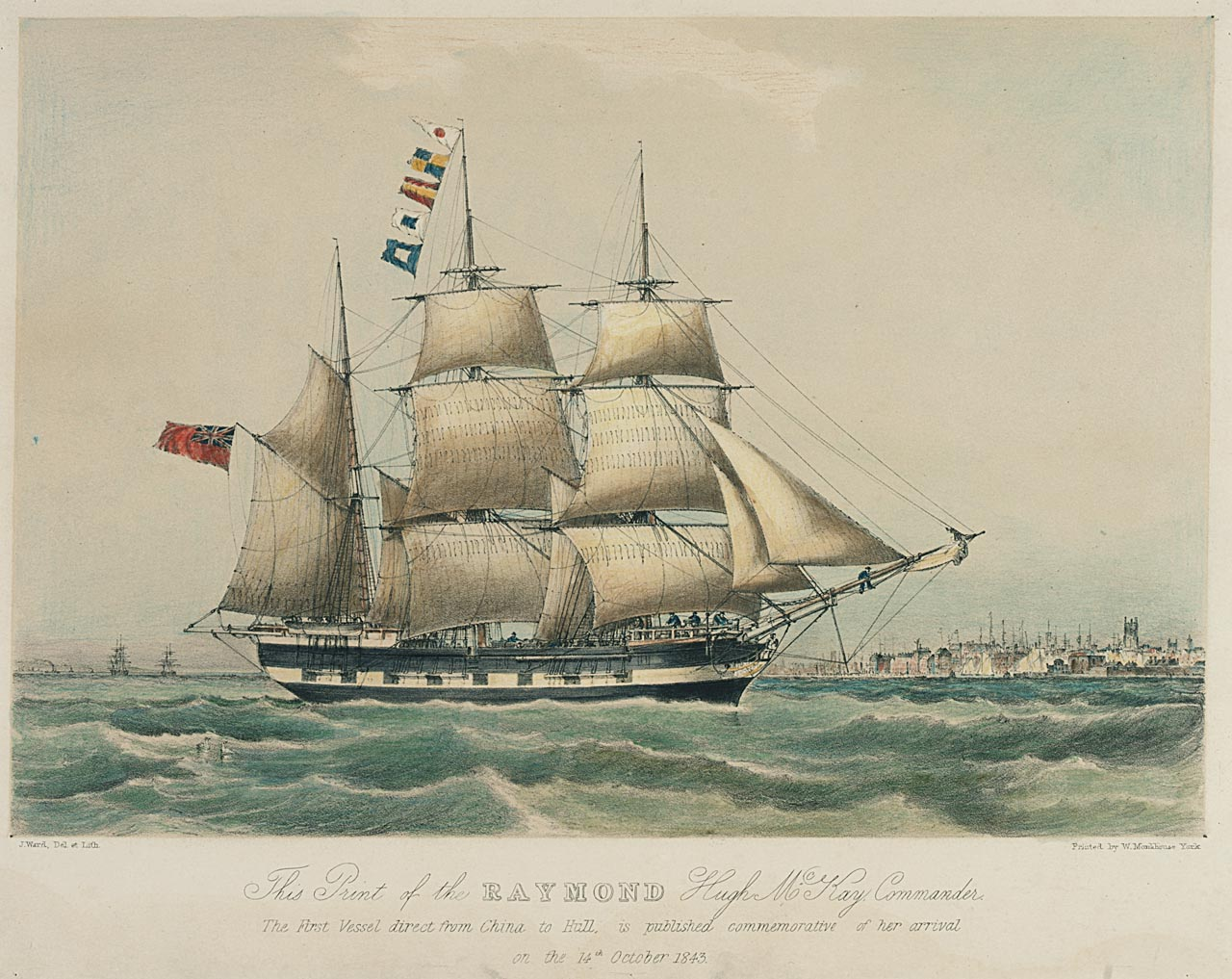
The Raymond, Hugh Mckay Commander. The first vessel direct from China to Hull on her arrival on 14 October 1843 with a cargo of tea.

The first record of tea in English came from a letter written by Richard Wickham, who ran an East India Company office in Japan, writing to a merchant in Macao requesting "the best sort of chaw" in 1615. Peter Mundy, a traveller and merchant who came across tea in Fujian in 1637, wrote, "chaa – only water with a kind of herb boyled in it". Tea was sold in a coffee house in London in 1657, Samuel Pepys tasted tea in 1660, and Catherine of Braganza took the tea-drinking habit to the English court when she married Charles II in 1662. Tea, however, was not widely consumed in the British Isles until the 18th century and remained expensive until the latter part of that period. English drinkers preferred to add sugar and milk to black tea, as the tea of choice in the 1720s. Tea smuggling during the 18th century led to the general public being able to afford and consume tea. The British government removed the tax on tea, thereby eliminating the smuggling trade, by 1785. In Britain and Ireland, tea was initially consumed as a luxury item on special occasions, such as religious festivals, wakes, and domestic work gatherings. The price of tea in Europe fell steadily during the 19th century, especially after Indian tea began to arrive in large quantities; by the late 19th century tea had become an everyday beverage for all levels of society. Consuming tea played a role in historical events – the Tea Act of 1773 provoked the Boston Tea Party that escalated into the American Revolution. The need to address the issue of British trade deficit because of the trade in tea resulted in the Opium Wars. The Qing Kangxi Emperor had banned foreign products from being sold in China, decreeing in 1685 that all goods bought from China must be paid for in silver coin or bullion. Traders from other nations then sought to find another product, in this case opium, to sell to China to earn back the silver they were required to pay for tea and other commodities. The subsequent attempts by the Chinese Government to curtail the trade in opium led to war.

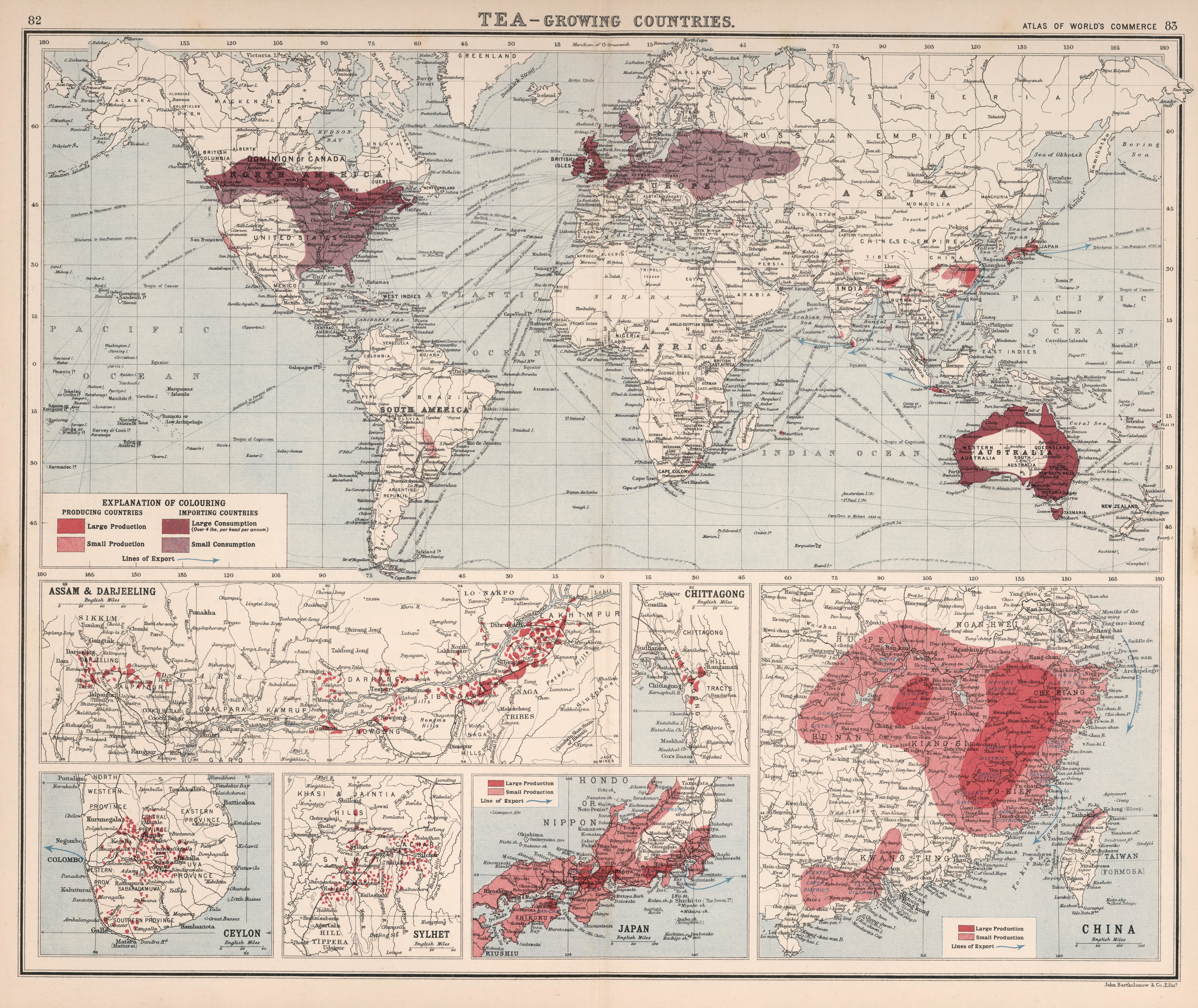
World map of tea exporters and importers, 1907

Chinese small-leaf-type tea was introduced into India in 1836 by the British in an attempt to break the Chinese monopoly on tea. In 1841, Archibald Campbell brought seeds of Chinese tea from the Kumaun region and experimented with planting tea in Darjeeling. The Alubari tea garden was opened in 1856, and Darjeeling tea began to be produced. In 1848, Robert Fortune was sent by the East India Company on a mission to China to bring the tea plant back to Great Britain. He began his journey in high secrecy as his mission occurred in the lull between the First Opium War and the Second Opium War. The Chinese tea plants he brought back were introduced to the Himalayas, though most did not survive. The British had discovered that a different variety of tea was endemic to Assam and the northeast region of India, which was then hybridized with Chinese small-leaf-type tea. Using Chinese planting and cultivation techniques, the British colonial government established a tea industry by offering land in Assam to any European who agreed to cultivate it for export. Tea was originally consumed only by Anglo-Indians; however, it became widely consumed in India in the 1950s because of a successful advertising campaign by the India Tea Board. The British introduced tea industry to Sri Lanka (then Ceylon) in 1867.

== Chemical composition ==
Physically speaking, tea has properties of both a solution and a suspension. It is a solution of the water-soluble compounds extracted from the tea leaves, such as the polyphenols and amino acids. Tea infusions are among most consumed beverages globally.

Caffeine makes up about 3% of tea's dry weight, which translates to between 30 and 90 milligrams per 250-millilitre (8 1/2 US fl oz) cup depending on the type, brand, and brewing method. A study found that the caffeine content of one gram of black tea ranged from 22 to 28 mg, while the caffeine content of one gram of green tea ranged from 11 to 20 mg, reflecting a significant difference. Tea contains small amounts of theobromine and theophylline, which are xanthines and stimulants, similar to caffeine.

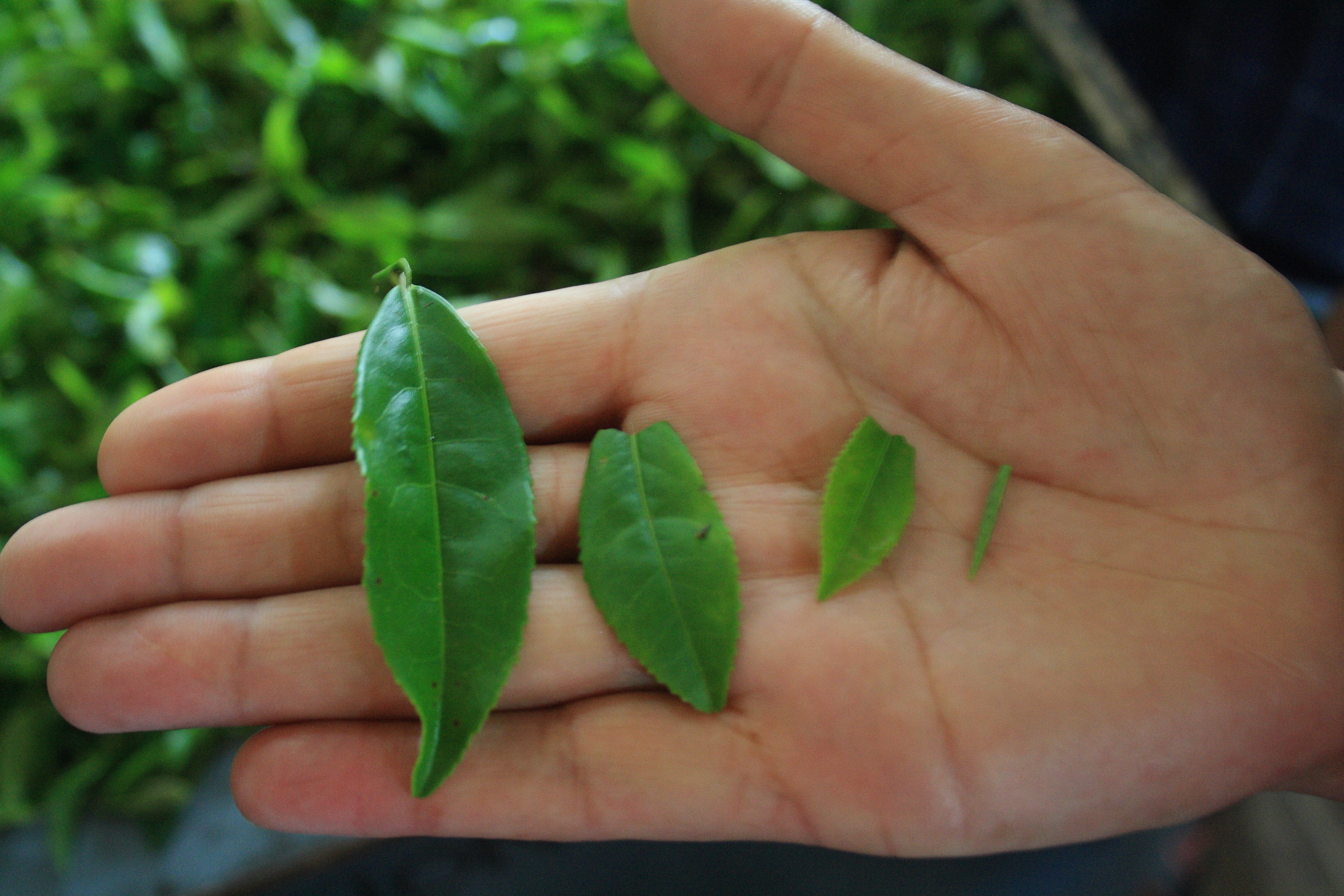
Fresh tea leaves in various stages of growth

The astringency in tea can be attributed to the presence of polyphenols. These are the most abundant compounds in tea leaves, making up 30–40% of their composition. Polyphenols in tea include flavonoids, epigallocatechin gallate, and other catechins.

== Health effects ==
There is no high-quality evidence showing that tea consumption has health effects, other than possibly increasing alertness caused by caffeine in the leaves. There is insufficient evidence that tea polyphenols have any effect on health or lowering disease risk.

Black and green teas contain no essential nutrients in significant amounts, with the exception of the dietary mineral manganese, at 0.5 mg per cup or 26% of the Reference Daily Intake. Fluoride is sometimes present in tea; certain types of "brick tea", made from old leaves and stems, have the highest levels, enough to pose a health risk if too much tea is drunk, which has been attributed to high levels of fluoride in soils, acidic soils, and long brewing.

== Cultivation and harvesting ==
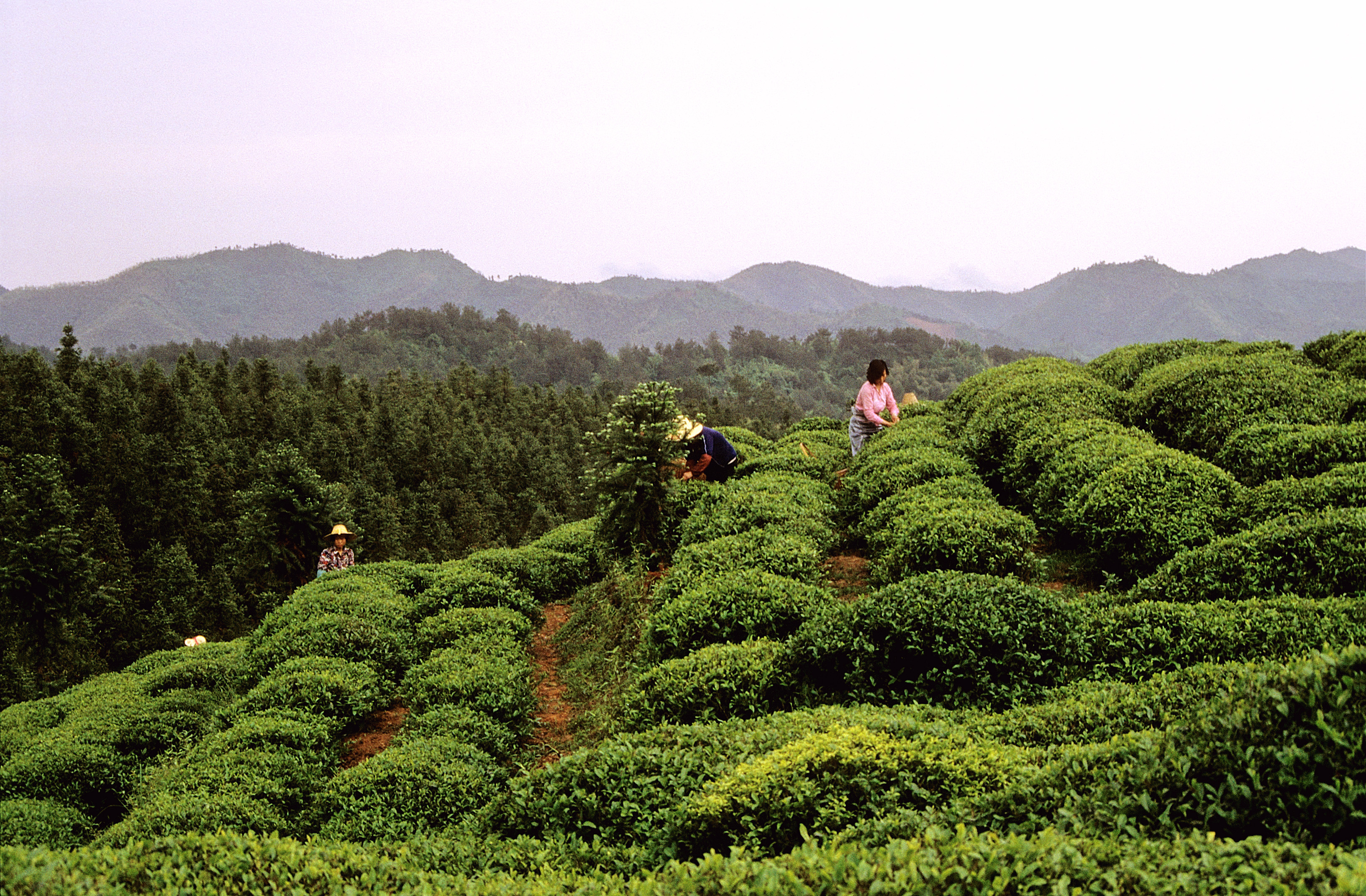
Tea harvesting in Zhejiang province, China, May 1987

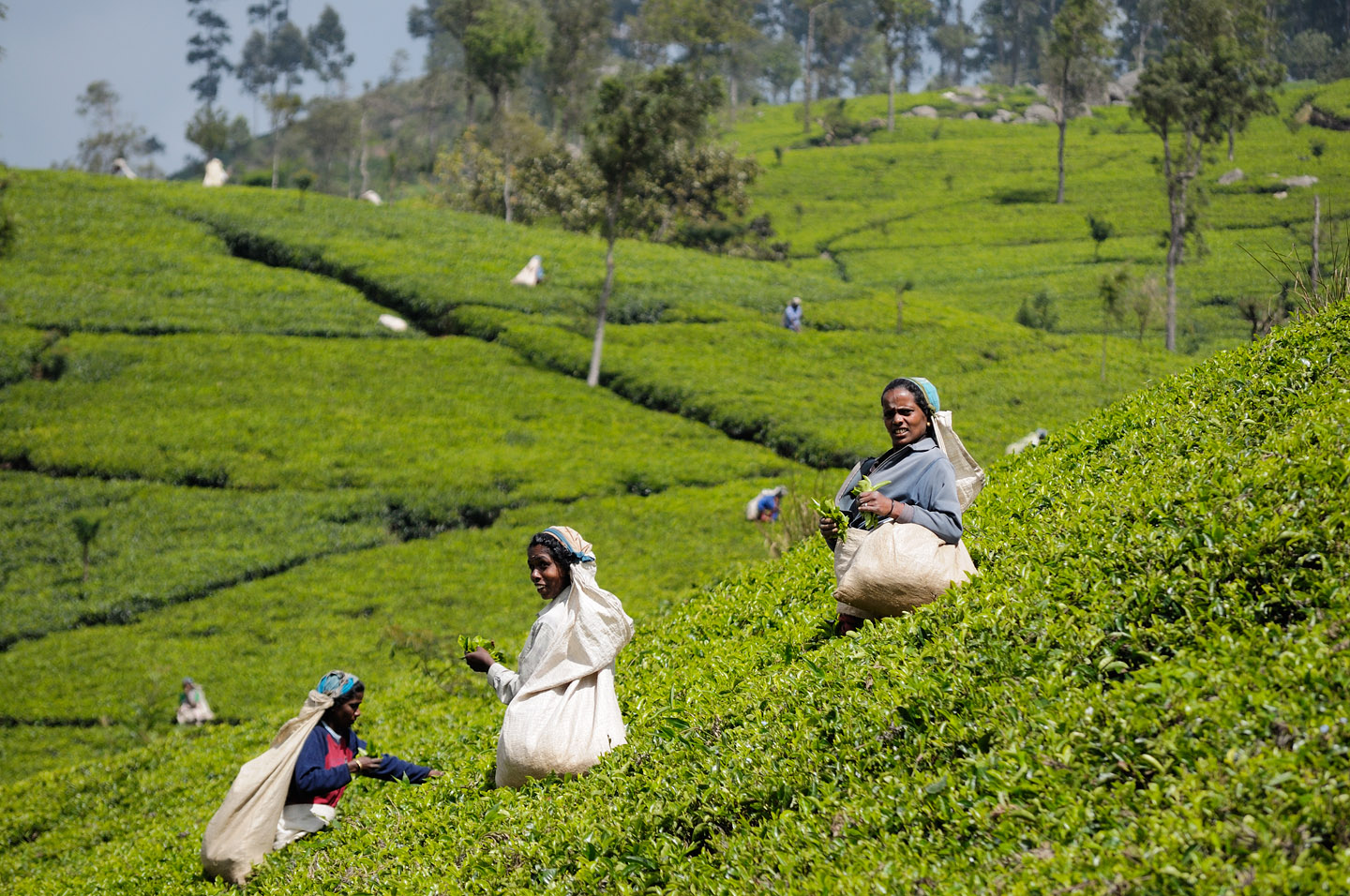
Tea plantation workers in Sri Lanka

Camellia sinensis is an evergreen plant that grows mainly in tropical and subtropical climates. Some varieties can tolerate oceanic climates and are cultivated as far north as Cornwall in England, Perthshire in Scotland, Washington in the United States, and Vancouver Island in Canada. In the Southern Hemisphere, tea is grown as far south as Hobart in Tasmania and Waikato in New Zealand.

Tea plants are propagated from seed and cuttings; about 4 to 12 years are needed for a plant to bear seed and about three years before a new plant is ready for harvesting. In addition to a zone 8 climate or warmer, tea plants require at least 1,200 millimetres (47 in) of rainfall per year and prefer acidic soils. Many high-quality tea plants are cultivated at elevations of up to 2,000 metres (6,600 ft) above sea level. Though at these heights the plants grow more slowly, they acquire a better flavour.

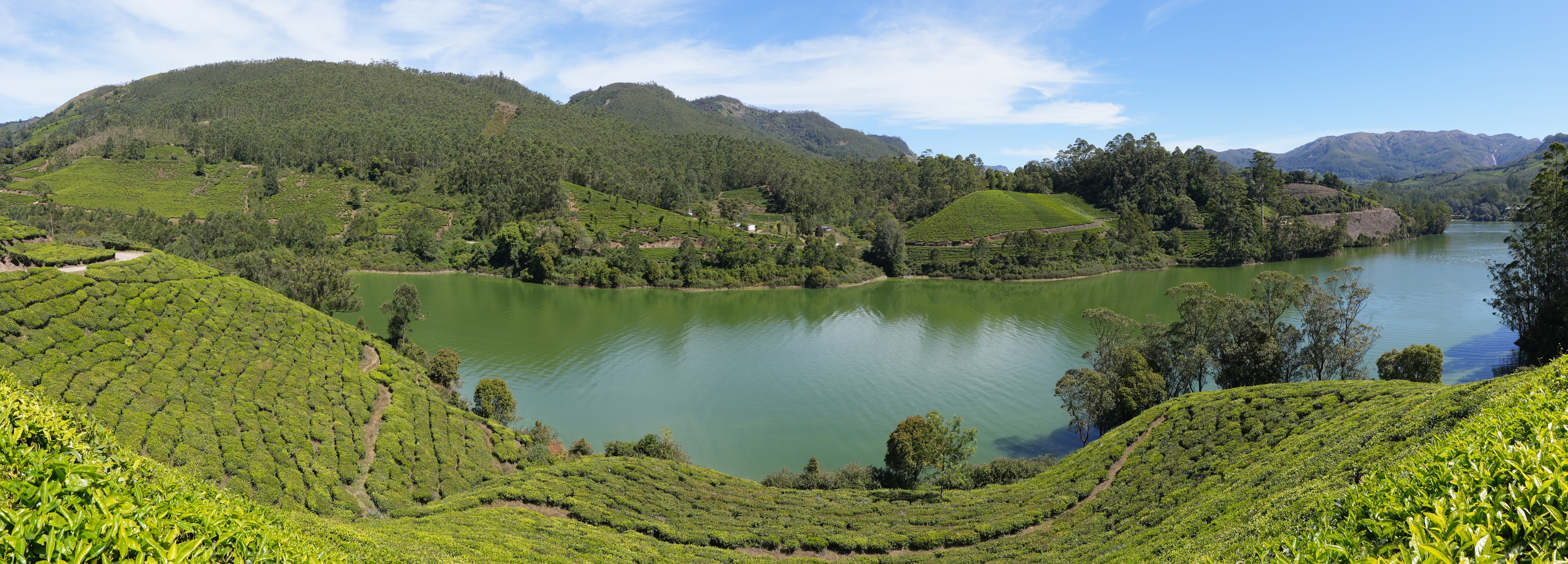
Tea plantations around Mattupetty lake near Munnar, India

Two principal varieties are used: Camellia sinensis var. sinensis, which is used for most Chinese, Formosan and Japanese teas, and C. sinensis var. assamica, used in Pu-erh and most Indian teas (but not Darjeeling). Within these botanical varieties, many strains and modern clonal varieties are known. Leaf size is the chief criterion for the classification of tea plants, with three primary classifications being: Assam type, characterised by the largest leaves; China type, characterised by the smallest leaves; and Cambodian type, characterised by leaves of intermediate size. The Cambodian-type tea (C. assamica subsp. lasiocaly) was originally considered a type of Assam tea. However, later genetic work showed that it is a hybrid between Chinese small-leaf tea and Assam-type large-leaf tea. Darjeeling tea appears to be another hybrid of the same sort.

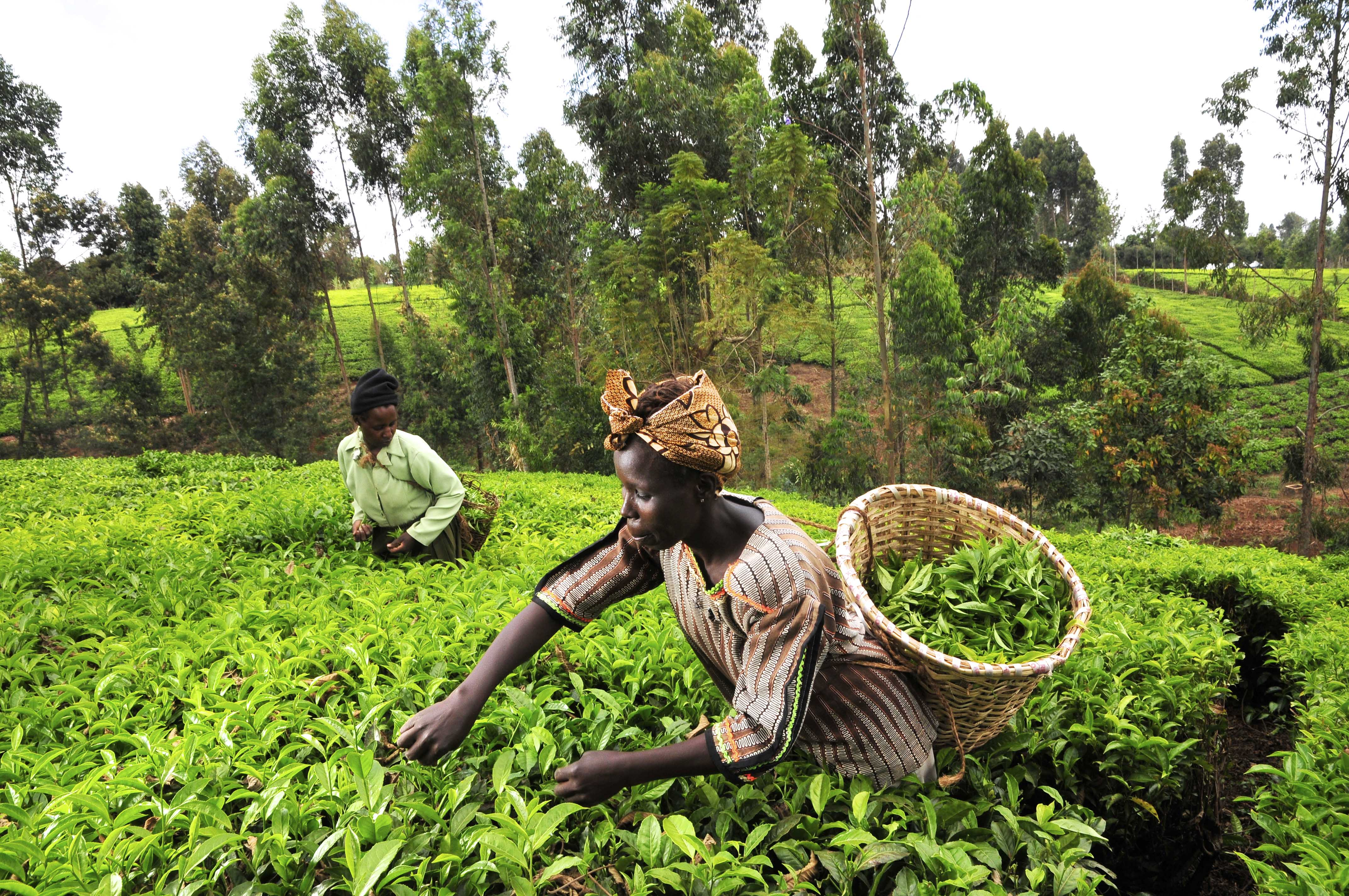
Women picking tea in Kenya

A tea plant will grow into a tree of up to 16 m (52 ft) if left undisturbed, but cultivated plants are generally pruned to waist height for ease of harvesting. The short plants also bear more new shoots which provide new and tender leaves and increase the quality of the tea. For centuries, tea shoots were harvested only by hand, or "plucked," but in time workers came to use shears or sickles to speed the job, and in the twentieth century commercial plantations adopted machines for the task, especially for low-grade black teas processed by the crush, tear, curl method. Today World Tea News estimates that at least 70 percent of tea bushes worldwide are harvested by practices other than plucking.

Only the top 25 to 50 millimetres (1 to 2 in) of the mature plant are picked. These buds and leaves are called 'flushes'. A plant will grow a new flush every 7 to 15 days during the growing season. Leaves that are slow in development tend to produce better-flavoured teas. Several teas are available from specified flushes; for example, Darjeeling tea is available as first flush (at a premium price), second flush, monsoon and autumn. Assam second flush or "tippy" tea is considered superior to first flush, because of the gold tips that appear on the leaves.

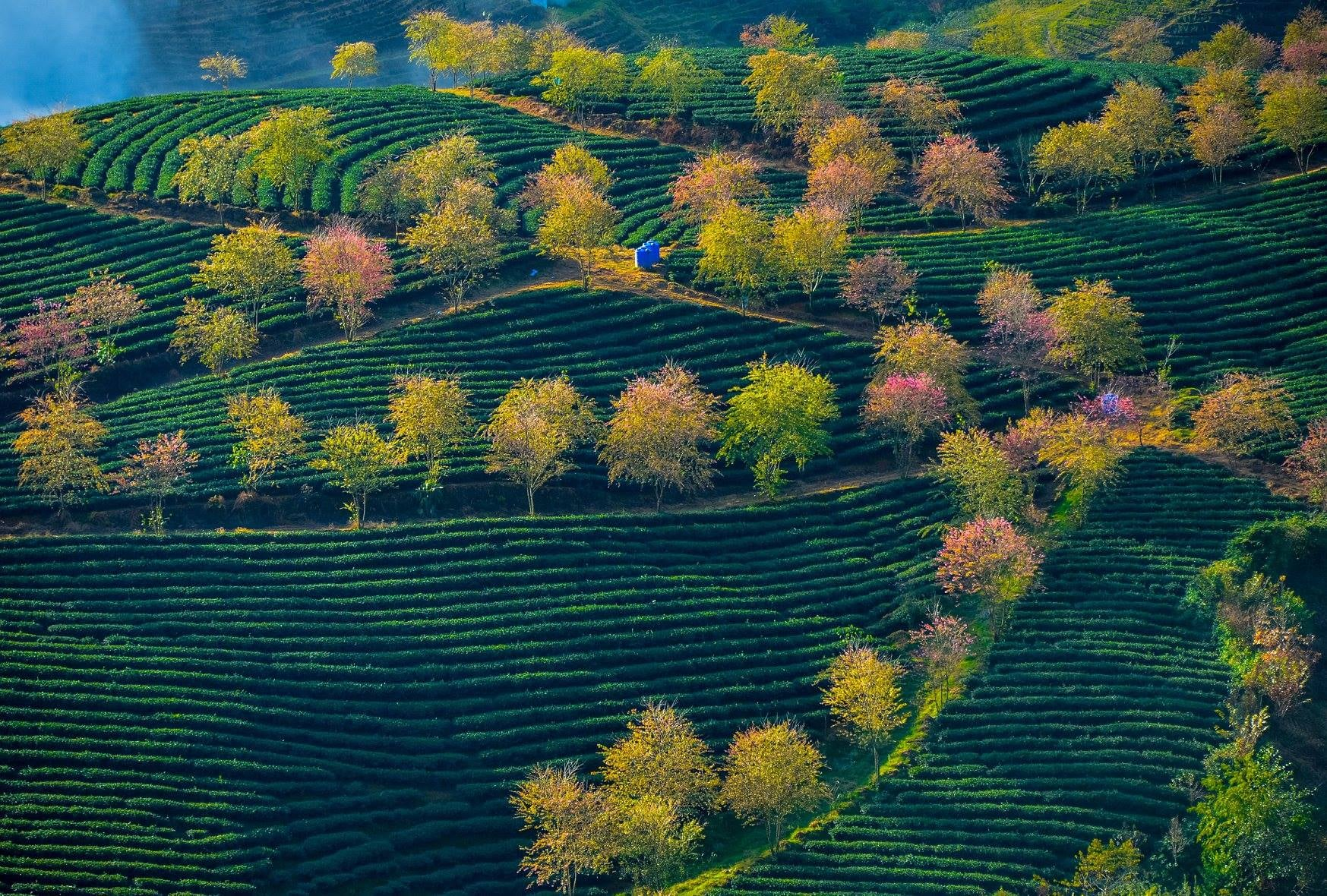
Tea plantation near Sa Pa, Vietnam

Pests that can afflict tea plants include mosquito bugs, genus Helopeltis, which are true bugs and not to be confused with dipterous insects of family Culicidae ('mosquitos'). Mosquito bugs can damage leaves both by sucking plant materials, and by the laying of eggs (oviposition) within the plant. Spraying with synthetic insecticides may be deemed appropriate. Other pests are Lepidopteran leaf feeders and various tea diseases.

== Production ==
Tea production – 2022
Country	Million tonnes
China	14.53
India	5.97
Kenya	2.33
Sri Lanka	1.40
Turkey	1.30
Vietnam	1.12
Indonesia	0.60
Bangladesh	0.44
Argentina	0.36
Uganda	0.33
World	29.76
Source: (FAO)

Tea is mainly grown in Asia and Africa, with smaller areas in South America and around the Black and Caspian Seas. The four biggest tea-producing countries are China, India, Kenya and Sri Lanka, together representing 81% of world tea production. Smaller hubs of production include such places as São Miguel Island, Azores, in Portugal, and Guria, in Georgia. In 2022, global production of tea was 29.8 million tonnes, led by China with 49% and India with 20% of the world total. Kenya, Sri Lanka, and Turkey were secondary producers.

=== Storage ===
Storage conditions determine the shelf life of tea; black tea shelf life is greater than that of green teas. Some, such as flower teas, may last only a month or so. Others, such as pu-erh, improve with age. To remain fresh and prevent mould, tea needs to be stored away from heat, light, air, and moisture. Tea must be kept at room temperature in an air-tight container. Black tea in a bag within a sealed opaque canister may keep for two years. Green tea deteriorates more rapidly, usually in less than a year. Tightly rolled gunpowder tea leaves keep longer than the more open-leafed Chun Mee tea.

Storage life for all teas can be extended by using desiccant or oxygen-absorbing packets, vacuum sealing, or refrigeration in air-tight containers (except green tea, where discrete use of refrigeration or freezing is recommended and temperature variation kept to a minimum).

=== Processing and classification ===
Common processing methods of tea leaves

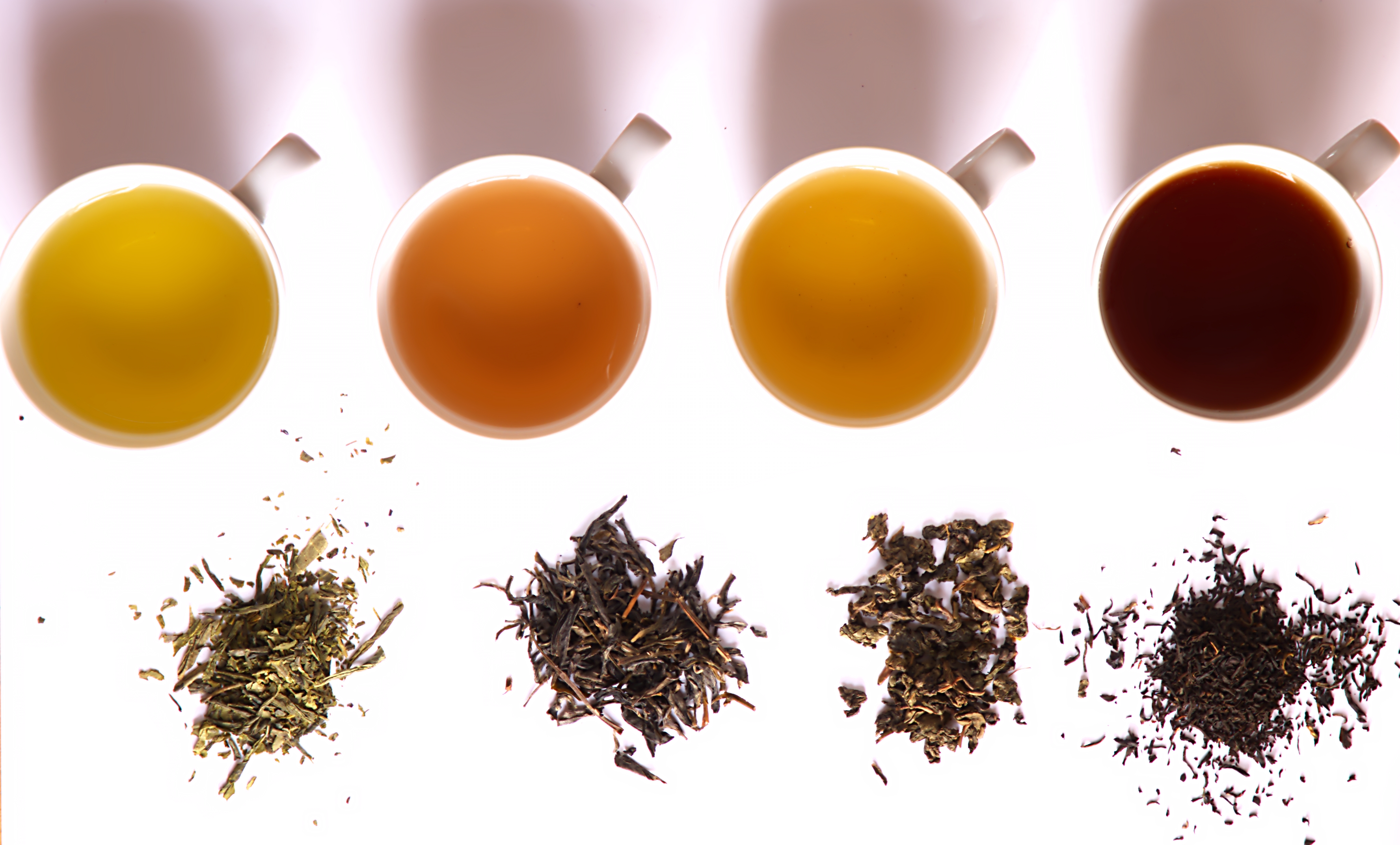
Teas of different levels of oxidation (L to R): green, yellow, oolong, and black

After picking, the leaves of C. sinensis soon begin to wilt and oxidize unless immediately dried. An enzymatic oxidation process triggered by the plant's intracellular enzymes causes the leaves to turn progressively darker as their chlorophyll breaks down and tannins are released. This darkening is stopped at a predetermined stage by heating, which deactivates the enzymes responsible. In the production of black teas, halting by heating is carried out simultaneously with drying. Without careful moisture and temperature control during manufacture and packaging, growth of undesired moulds and bacteria may make tea unfit for consumption.

Tea is divided into categories based on how it is processed. At least six different types are produced:

- Green: unwilted and unoxidized;
- Yellow: unwilted and unoxidized but allowed to yellow;
- White: wilted and unoxidized;
- Oolong: wilted, bruised, and partially oxidized;
- Black: wilted, sometimes crushed, and fully oxidized (called 紅茶 [hóngchá], "red tea" in Chinese and other East Asian tea culture);
- Post-fermented (Dark): green tea that has been allowed to ferment/compost (called Pu'er if from the Yunnan district of South-Western China or 黑茶 [hēichá] "black tea" in Chinese tea culture).

=== Blending and additives ===
After basic processing, teas may be altered through additional processing steps before being sold and are often consumed with additions to the basic tea leaf and water added during preparation or drinking. Examples of additional processing steps that occur before tea is sold are blending, flavouring, scenting, and decaffeination of teas. Examples of additions added at the point of consumption include milk, sugar and lemon.

Tea blending is the combination of different teas together to achieve the final product. Such teas may combine others from the same cultivation area or several different ones. The aim is to obtain consistency, better taste, higher price, or some combination of the three.

Flavoured and scented teas are enhancements of the base tea. This can be accomplished through directly adding flavouring agents, such as ginger, cloves, mint leaves, cardamom, bergamot (found in Earl Grey), vanilla, and spearmint. Alternatively, because tea easily retains odours, it can be placed in proximity to an aromatic ingredient to absorb its aroma, as in traditional jasmine tea.

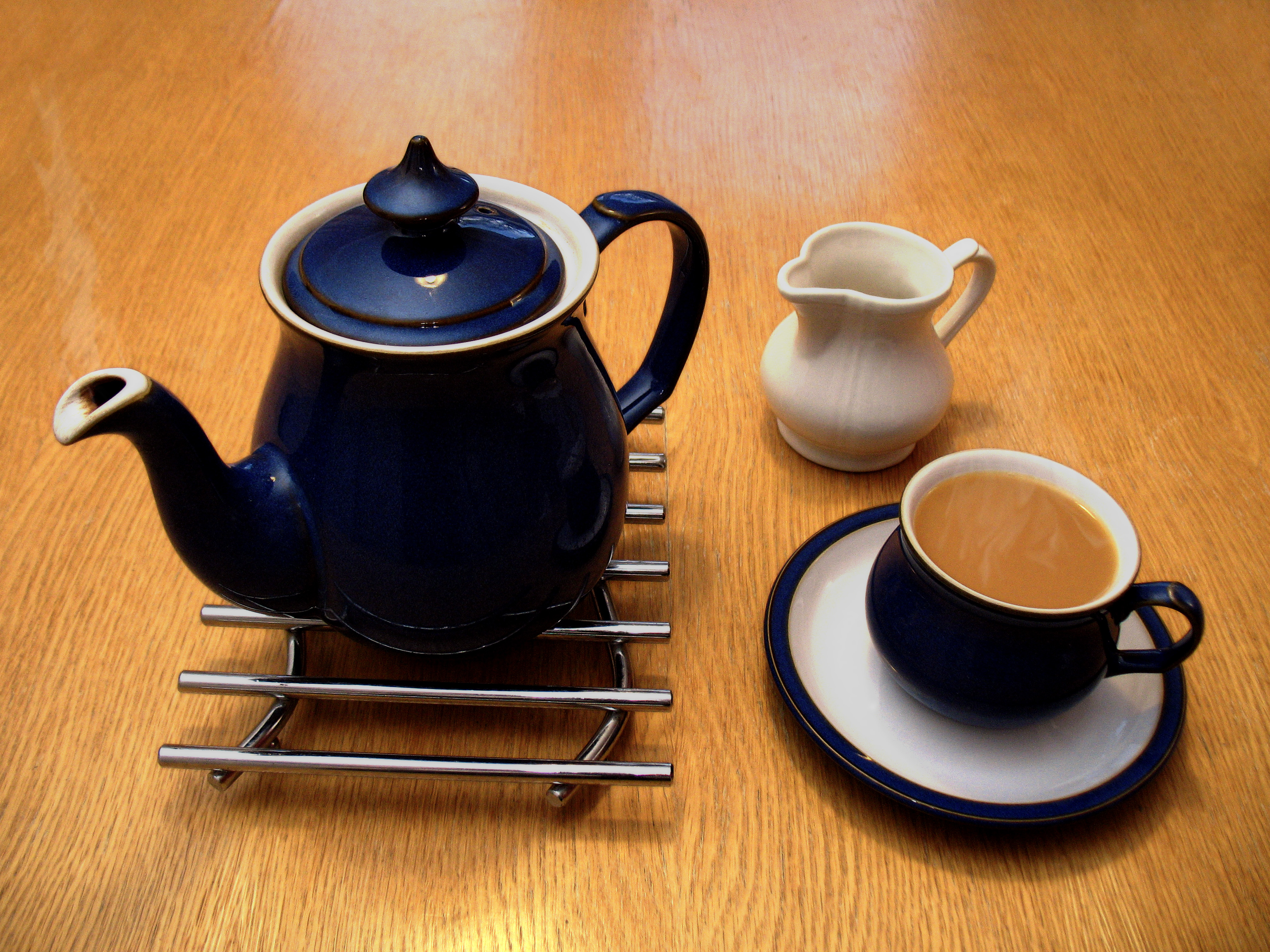
Black tea is often taken with milk.

The addition of milk to tea in Europe was first mentioned in 1680 by the epistolist Madame de Sévigné. Many teas are traditionally drunk with milk in cultures where dairy products are consumed. These include Indian masala chai and British tea blends. These teas tend to be very hearty varieties of black tea which can be tasted through the milk, such as Assams, or the East Friesian blend. Milk is thought to neutralise remaining tannins and reduce acidity. The Han Chinese do not usually drink milk with tea but the Manchus do, and the elite of the Qing Dynasty of the Chinese Empire continued to do so. Hong Kong-style milk tea is based on British habits. Tibetans and other Himalayan peoples traditionally drink tea with milk or yak butter and salt. In Eastern European countries, and in Russia and Italy, tea is commonly served with lemon juice. In Poland, tea is traditionally served with a slice of lemon and is sweetened with either sugar or honey; tea with milk – called a bawarka ("Bavarian style") in Polish – is common. In Australia, tea with milk is known as "white tea".

The order of steps in preparing a cup of tea is a much-debated topic and can vary widely between cultures and individuals. Some say it is preferable to add the milk to the cup before the tea, as the high temperature of freshly brewed tea can denature the proteins found in fresh milk, similar to the change in taste of UHT milk, resulting in an inferior-tasting beverage. Others insist it is better to add the milk to the cup after the tea, as black tea is often brewed as close to boiling as possible. The addition of milk chills the beverage during the crucial brewing phase, if brewing in a cup rather than using a pot, meaning the delicate flavour of a good tea cannot be fully appreciated. By adding the milk afterwards, it is easier to dissolve sugar in the tea and to ensure the desired amount of milk is added, as the colour of the tea can be observed. Historically, the order of steps was taken as an indication of class: only those wealthy enough to afford good-quality porcelain would be confident of its being able to cope with being exposed to boiling water unadulterated with milk. Higher temperature difference means faster heat transfer, so the earlier milk is added, the slower the drink cools. A 2007 study published in the European Heart Journal found certain beneficial effects of tea may be lost through the addition of milk.

== Packaging ==
=== Tea bags ===
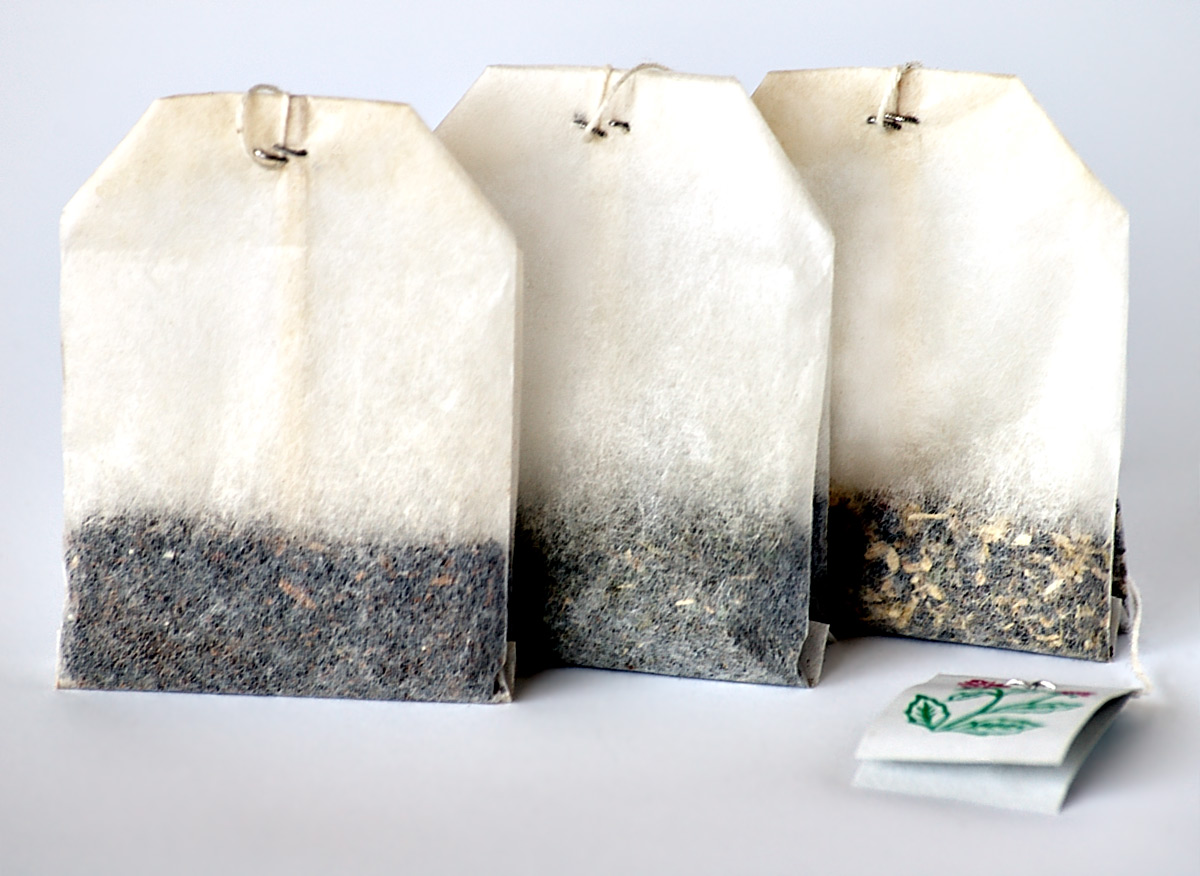
Tea bags

In 1907, American tea merchant Thomas Sullivan began distributing samples of his tea in small bags of silk with a drawstring. Consumers noticed they could simply leave the tea in the bag and reuse it with fresh tea. However, the potential of this distribution and packaging method would not be fully realised until later. During World War II, tea was rationed in the United Kingdom. In 1953, after rationing in the UK ended, Yorkshire-based tea manufacturer Tetley launched the tea bag in the UK, and it was an immediate success.

The "pyramid tea bag" (or sachet), introduced by Lipton and PG Tips/Scottish Blend in 1996, attempts to address one of the connoisseurs' arguments against paper tea bags by way of its three-dimensional tetrahedron shape, which allows more room for tea leaves to expand while steeping. However, some types of pyramid tea bags have been criticised as being environmentally unfriendly, since their synthetic material is not as biodegradable as loose tea leaves and paper tea bags.

=== Loose tea ===
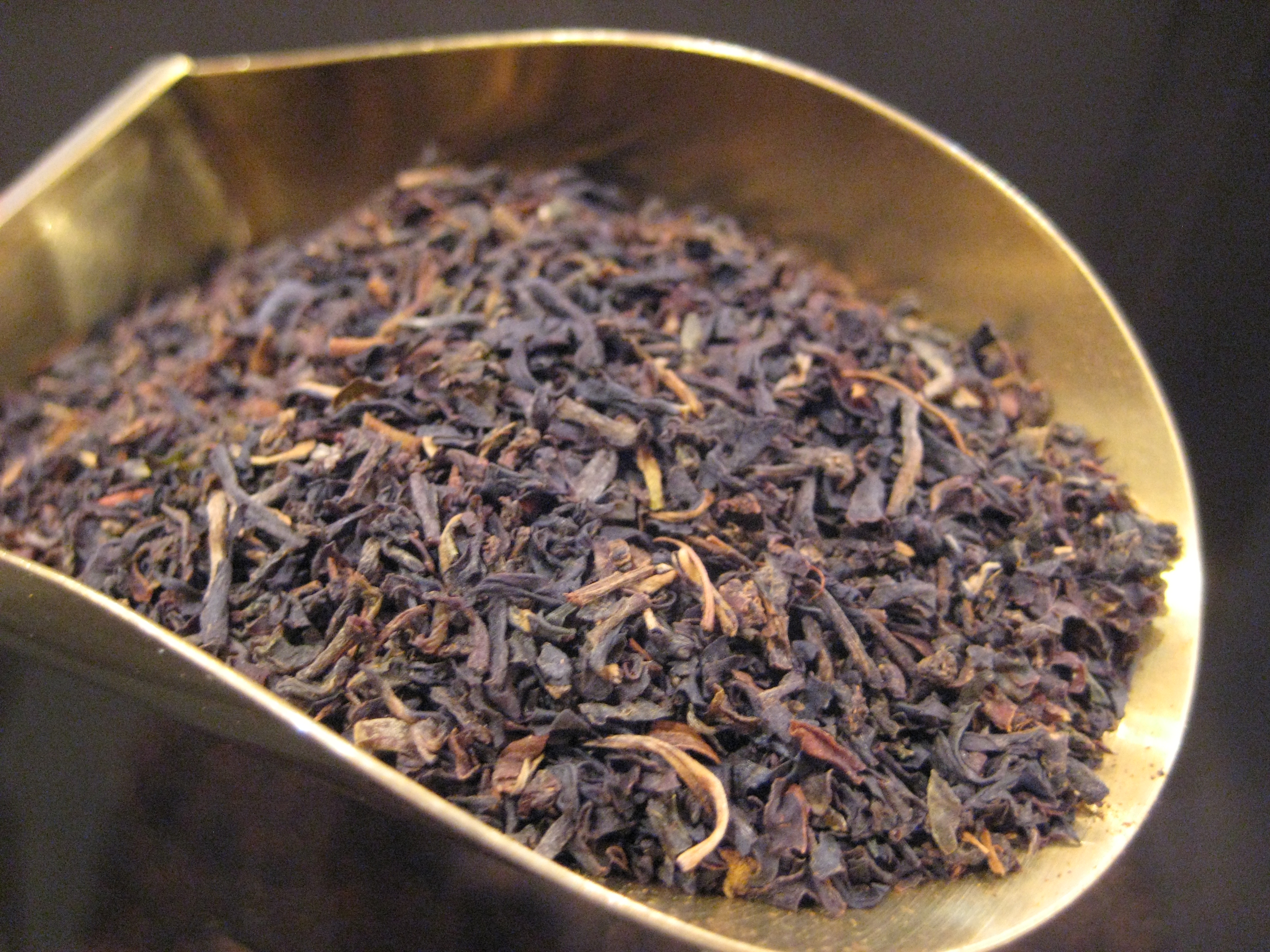
A blend of loose-leaf black teas

The tea leaves are packaged loosely in a canister, paper bag, or other container such as a tea chest. Some whole teas, such as rolled gunpowder tea leaves, which resist crumbling, are vacuum-packed for freshness in aluminised packaging for storage and retail. The loose tea is individually measured for use, allowing for flexibility and flavour control at the expense of convenience. Strainers, tea balls, tea presses, filtered teapots, and infusion bags prevent loose leaves from floating in the tea and over-brewing. A traditional method uses a three-piece lidded teacup called a gaiwan, the lid of which is tilted to decant the tea into a different cup for consumption.

=== Compressed tea ===
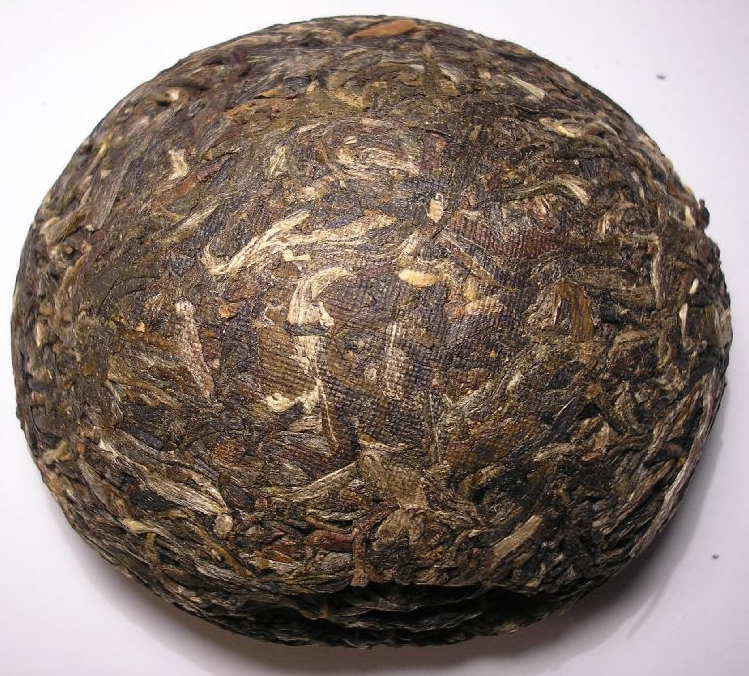
Sheng (raw) pu-erh tuo cha, a type of compressed aged raw pu-erh

Tea bricks or compressed tea are produced for convenience in transport, storage, and ageing. It can usually be stored longer without spoilage than loose leaf tea. Compressed tea is prepared by loosening leaves from the cake using a small knife, and steeping the extracted pieces in water. During the Tang dynasty, as described by Lu Yu, compressed tea was ground into a powder, combined with hot water, and ladled into bowls, resulting in a "frothy" mixture. In the Song dynasty, the tea powder would instead be whisked with hot water in the bowl. Although no longer practiced in China today, the whisking method of preparing powdered tea was transmitted to Japan by Zen Buddhist monks, and is still used to prepare matcha in the Japanese tea ceremony. Chinese pu-erh is often distributed in the form, as other teas may sometimes be.

Compressed tea was the most common form of tea in China during the Tang dynasty. By the beginning of the Ming dynasty, it had been displaced by loose-leaf tea. In Mongolia, tea bricks were ubiquitous enough to be used as a form of currency. Among Himalayan peoples, compressed tea is consumed by combining it with yak butter and salt to produce butter tea.

=== Instant tea ===
"Instant tea", similar to freeze-dried instant coffee and an alternative to brewed tea, can be consumed either hot or cold. Instant tea was developed in the 1930s, with Nestlé introducing the first commercial product in 1946, while Redi-Tea debuted instant iced tea in 1953. Additives, such as chai, vanilla, honey, fruit or powdered milk, are commonly used.

During the Second World War, British and Canadian soldiers were issued instant tea in their composite ration ("compo") packs. These blocks of instant tea, powdered milk, and sugar were not always well received. As Royal Canadian Artillery Gunner, George C Blackburn observed:

But, unquestionably, the feature of Compo rations destined to be remembered beyond all others is Compo tea...Directions say to "sprinkle powder on heated water and bring to the boil, stirring well, three heaped teaspoons to one pint of water." Every possible variation in the preparation of this tea was tried, but...it always ended up the same way. While still too hot to drink, it is a good-looking cup of strong tea. Even when it becomes just cool enough to be sipped gingerly, it is still a good-tasting cup of tea, if you like your tea strong and sweet. But let it cool enough to be quaffed and enjoyed, and your lips will be coated with a sticky scum that forms across the surface, which if left undisturbed will become a leathery membrane that can be wound around your finger and flipped away...

=== Bottled and canned tea ===
Canned tea is sold prepared and ready to drink. It was introduced in 1981 in Japan. The first bottled tea was introduced by an Indonesian tea company, PT. Sinar Sosro in 1969 with the brand name Teh Botol Sosro (or Sosro bottled tea). In 1983, Swiss-based Bischofszell Food Ltd. was the first company to bottle iced tea on an industrial scale.

== Tea culture ==
In many cultures, tea is consumed at elevated social events, such as the tea party. Tea ceremonies have arisen in different cultures, such as the Chinese and Japanese traditions, each of which employs certain techniques and ritualised protocol of brewing and serving tea for enjoyment in a refined setting. One form of Chinese tea ceremony is the Gongfu tea ceremony, which typically uses small Yixing clay teapots and oolong tea.

In the United Kingdom, 63% of people drink tea daily. It is customary for a host to offer tea to guests soon after their arrival. Tea is consumed both at home and outside the home, often in cafés or tea rooms. Afternoon tea with cakes on fine porcelain is a cultural stereotype. In southwest England, many cafés serve a cream tea, consisting of scones, clotted cream, and jam alongside a pot of tea.

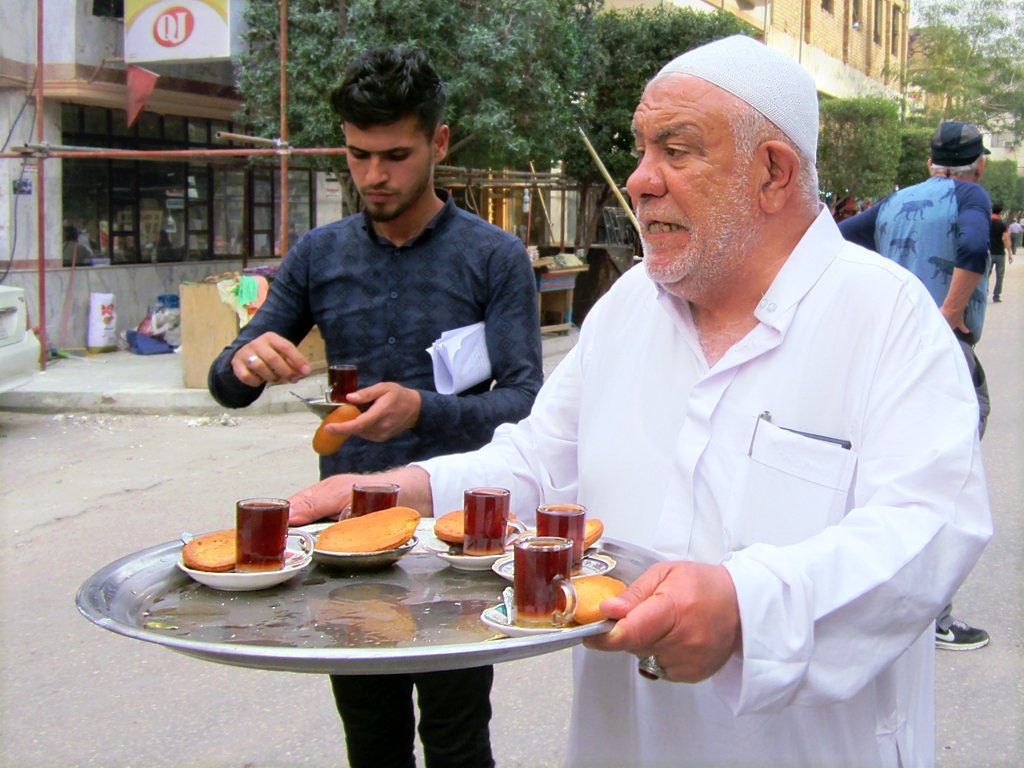
Tea being served in Karbala, Iraq

Ireland, as of 2016, was the second-biggest per capita consumer of tea in the world, after Turkey. Local blends are the most common in Ireland, including Irish breakfast tea, using Rwandan, Kenyan and Assam teas. The annual national average of tea consumption in Ireland is 2.7 kg to 4 kg per person. Tea in Ireland is usually taken with milk or sugar and brewed longer for a stronger taste.

Turkish tea is an important part of that country's cuisine and is the most commonly consumed hot drink, despite the country's long history with coffee. In 2004, Turkey produced 205,500 tonnes of tea (6.4% of the global total), which made it one of the largest tea markets in the world, with 120,000 tons being consumed in Turkey and the rest being exported. In 2010, Turkey had the highest per capita consumption in the world at 2.7 kg. As of 2013, the per-capita consumption of Turkish tea exceeds 10 cups per day and 13.8 kg per year. Tea is grown mostly in Rize Province on the Black Sea coast.

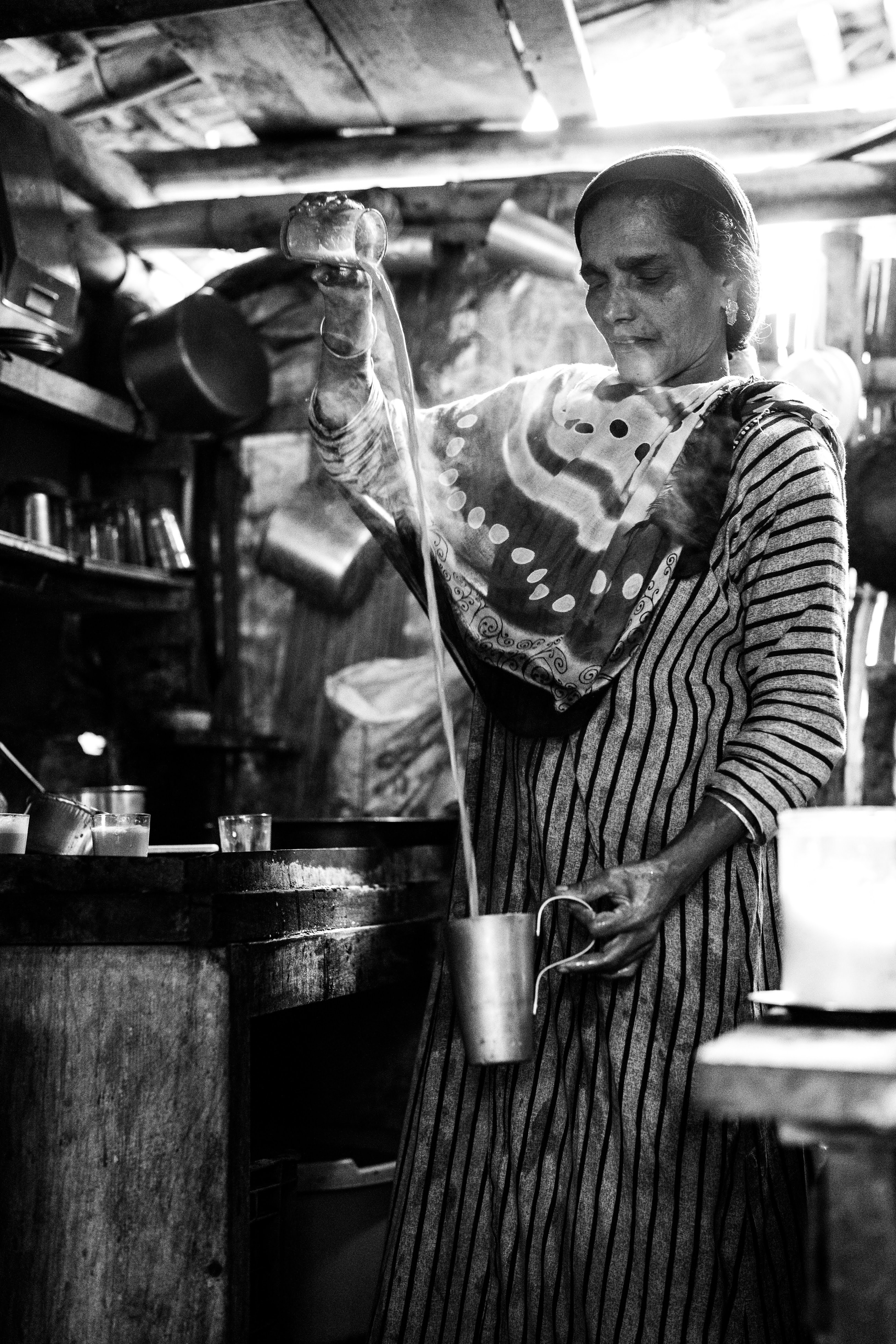
South Indian woman preparing a cup of morning tea in the traditional South Indian way

Russia has a long, rich tea history dating to 1638 when tea was introduced to Tsar Michael. Social gatherings were considered incomplete without tea, which was traditionally brewed in a samovar.

In Pakistan, both black and green teas are used, known locally as sabz chai and kahwah, respectively. Green tea is often served after every meal in the Pashtun belt of Balochistan and in Khyber Pakhtunkhwa. In central and southern Punjab and the metropolitan Sindh region of Pakistan, tea with milk and sugar (sometimes with pistachios, cardamom, etc.), commonly referred to as chai, is widely consumed. It is the most common beverage of households in the region. In the northern Pakistani regions of Chitral and Gilgit-Baltistan, a salty, buttered Tibetan-style tea is consumed.

Indian tea culture demonstrates that tea is the most consumed hot beverage in the country. It is common in most homes, offered to guests, consumed in high amounts in domestic and official surroundings, and is made with the addition of milk with or without spices, and usually sweetened. It is sometimes served with biscuits to be dipped in the tea and eaten before consuming the tea. More often than not, it is drunk in "doses" of small cups (referred to as "cutting" chai if sold at street tea vendors) rather than one large cup.

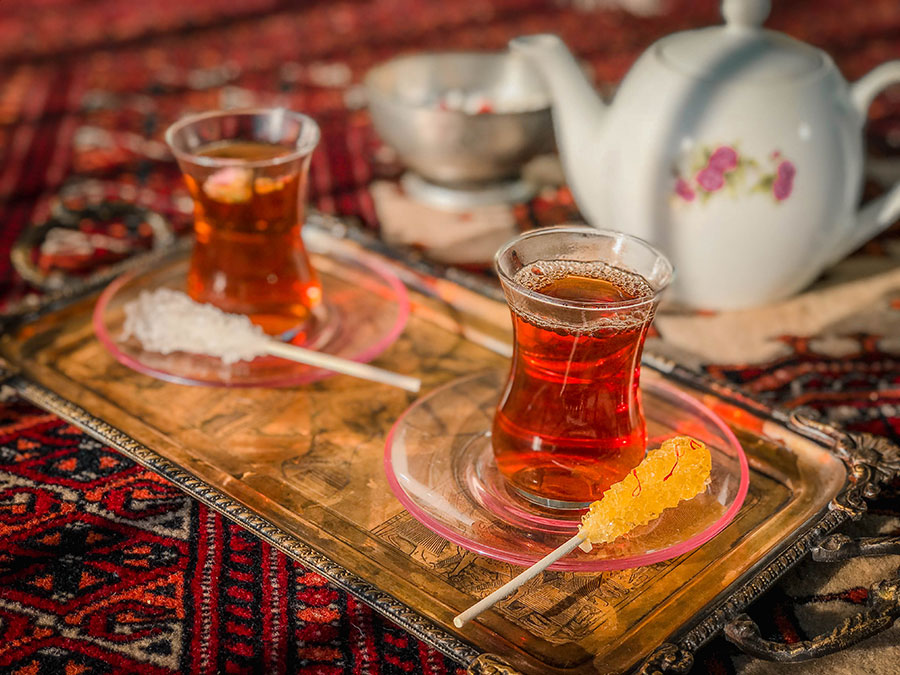
Iranians usually drink tea with rock candy or ghand and in glass cups.

Iranians have one of the highest per capita rates of tea consumption in the world. Châikhânes (teahouses) are common in Iran. Iranian tea is typically served in traditional Iranian glasses with a traditional saucer and teaspoon. Tea is cultivated in northern Iran along the shores of the Caspian Sea.

In Burma (Myanmar), tea is consumed not only as hot drinks, but also as sweet tea and green tea known locally as laphet-yay and laphet-yay-gyan, respectively. Pickled tea leaves, known locally as lahpet, are a national delicacy. Pickled tea is usually eaten with roasted sesame seeds, crispy fried beans, roasted peanuts and fried garlic chips.

In Mali, gunpowder tea is served in series of three, starting with the highest oxidisation or strongest, unsweetened tea, locally referred to as "strong like death", followed by a second serving, where the same tea leaves are boiled again with some sugar added ("pleasant as life"), and a third one, where the same tea leaves are boiled for the third time with yet more sugar added ("sweet as love"). Green tea is the central ingredient of a distinctly Malian custom, the "grin", an informal social gathering that cuts across social and economic lines, starting in front of family compound gates in the afternoons and extending late into the night, and is widely consumed in Bamako and other large urban areas.

In the United States, 80% of tea is consumed as iced tea. Sweet tea is native to the southeastern U.S. and is iconic in its cuisine due to its refreshing temperature and large amount of sweetener.

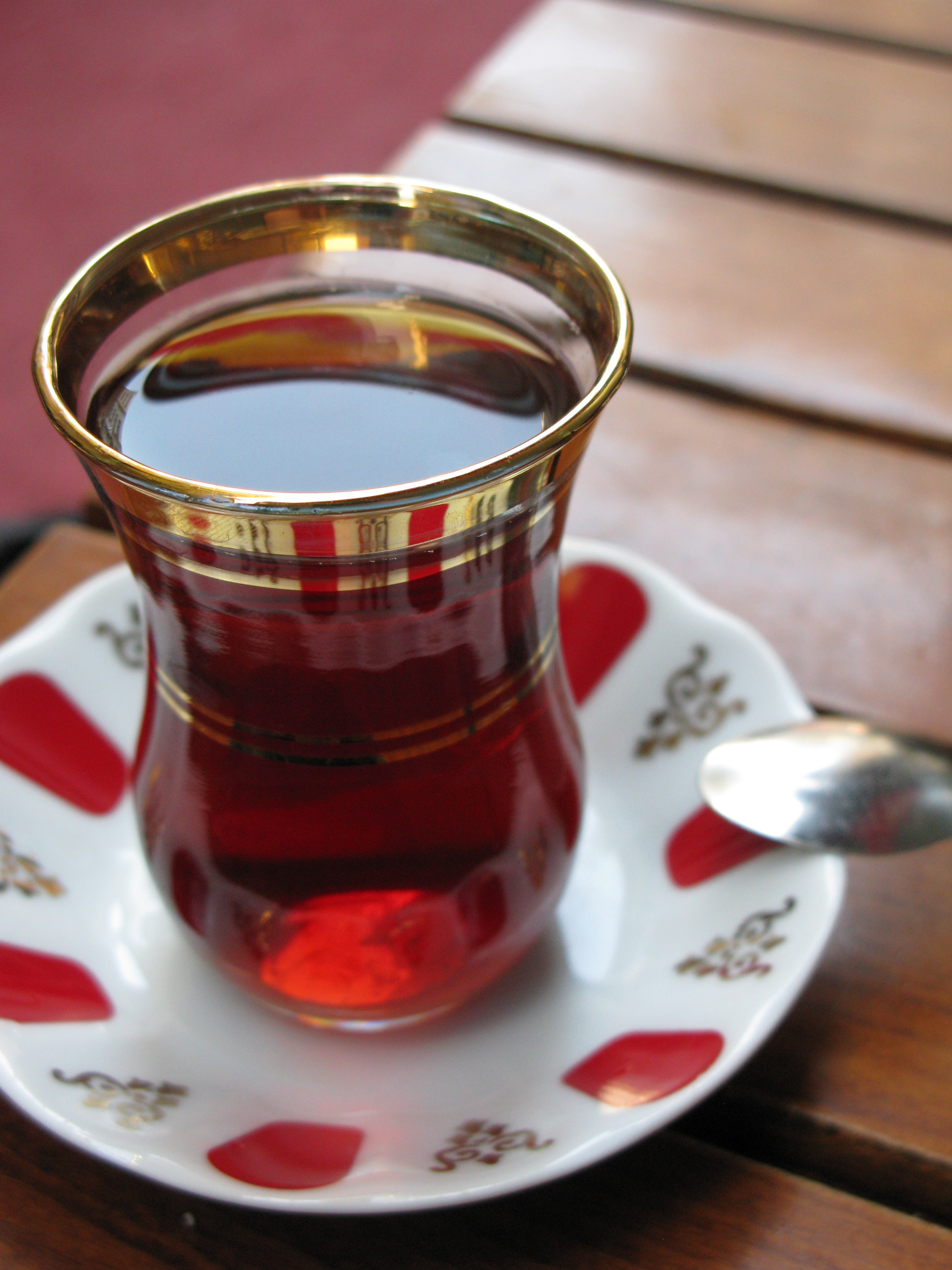
Turkish tea served in a typical small glass and corresponding saucer

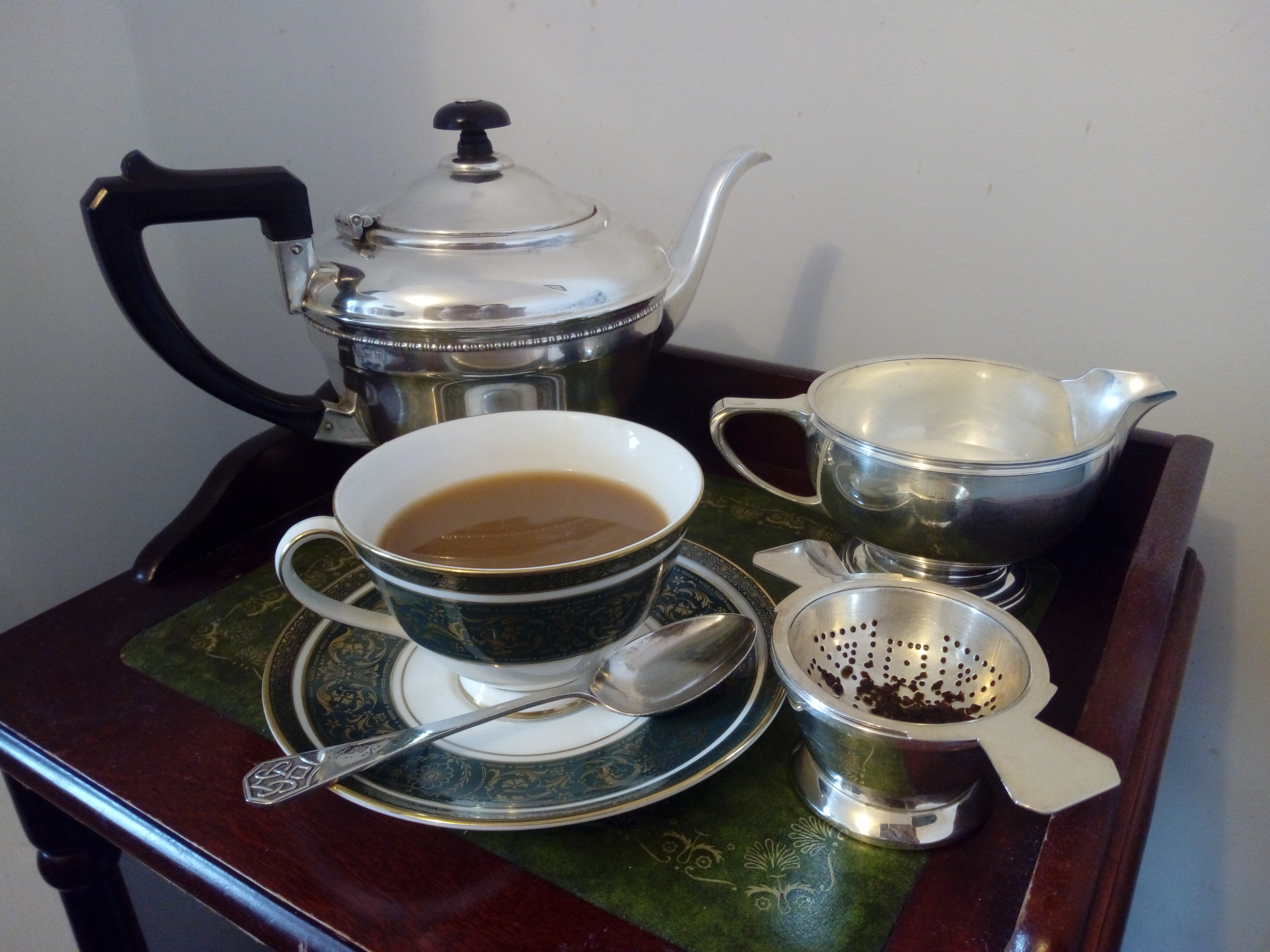
English teaware

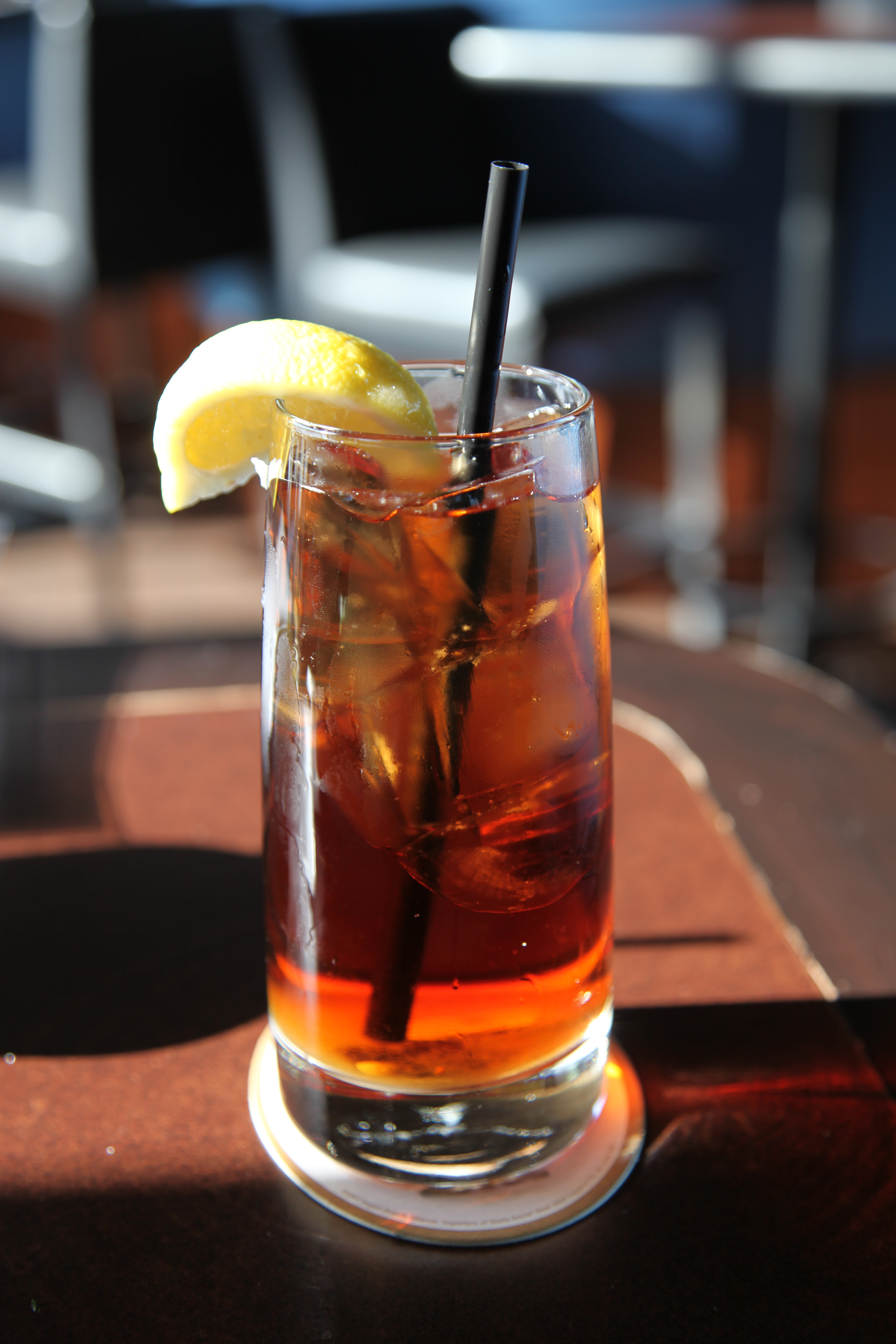
Iced tea with a slice of lemon

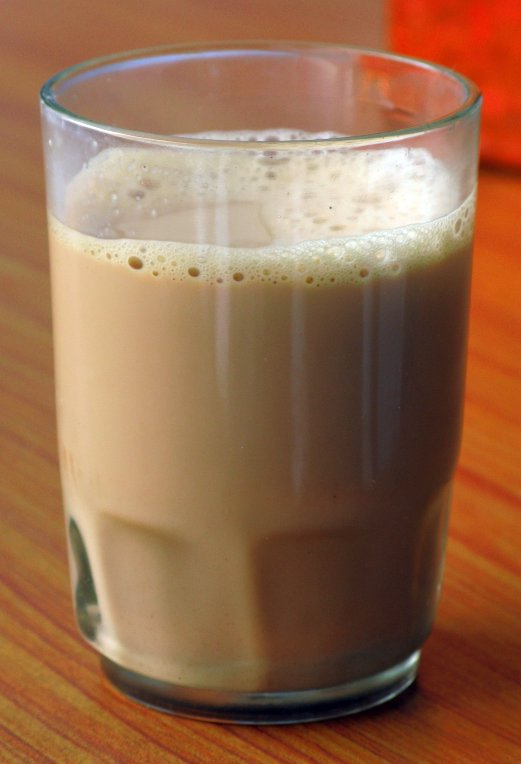
Indian masala tea

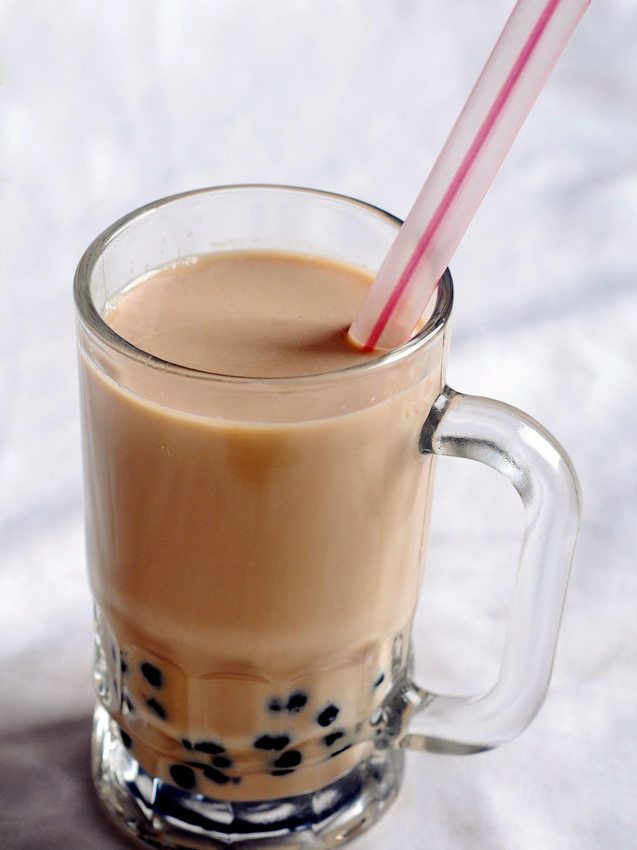
Bubble tea

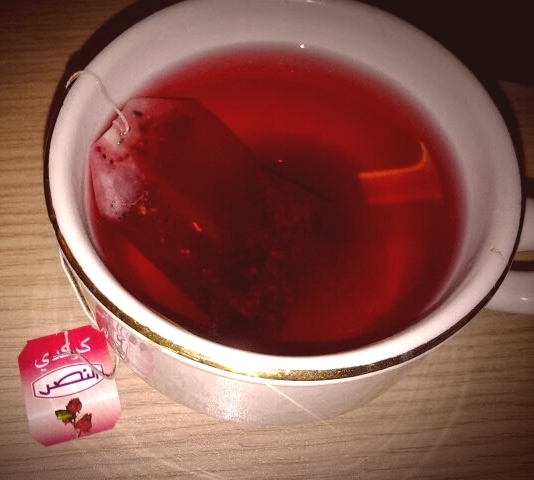
Hibiscus tea

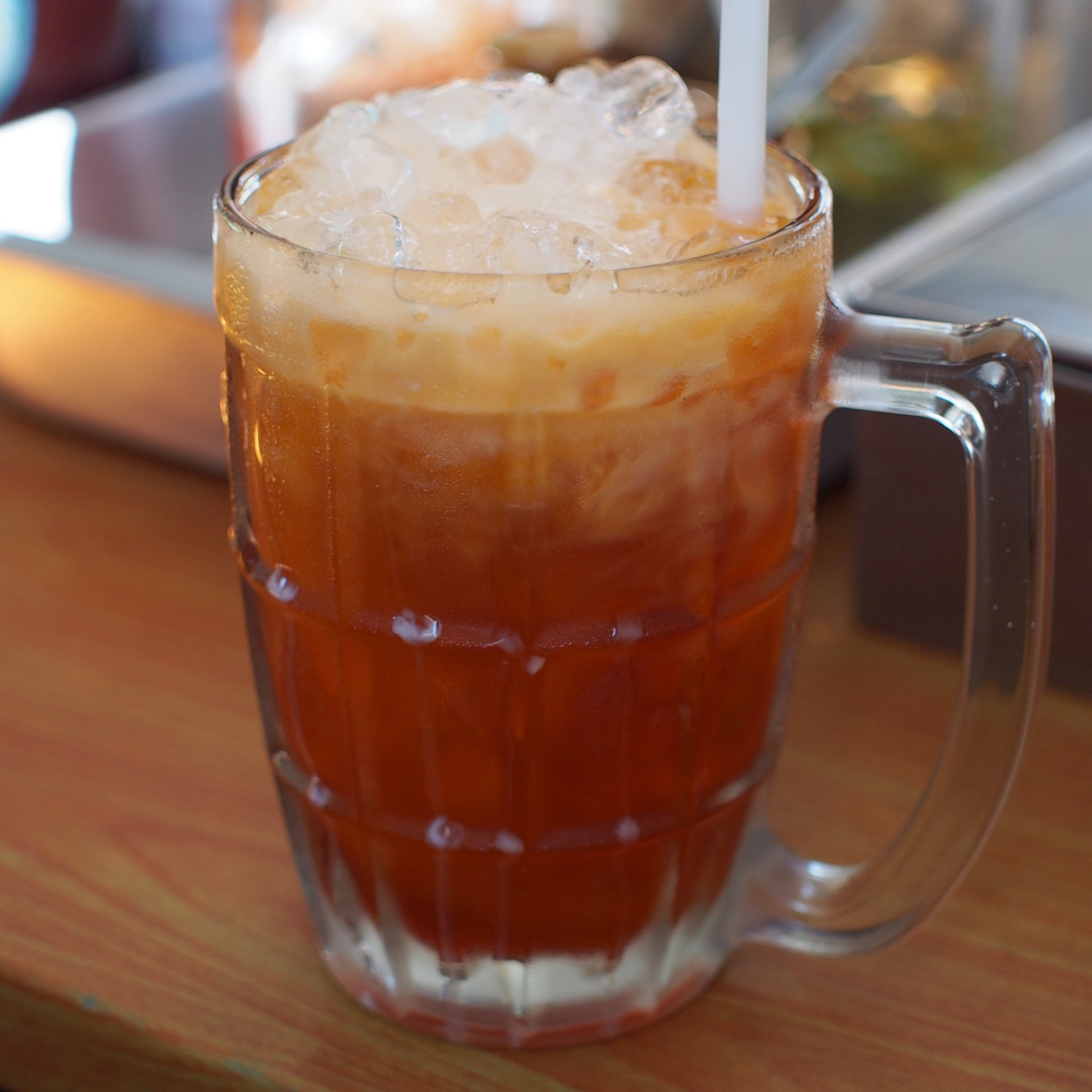
Thai tea

== Economics ==
=== Producers and consumers ===
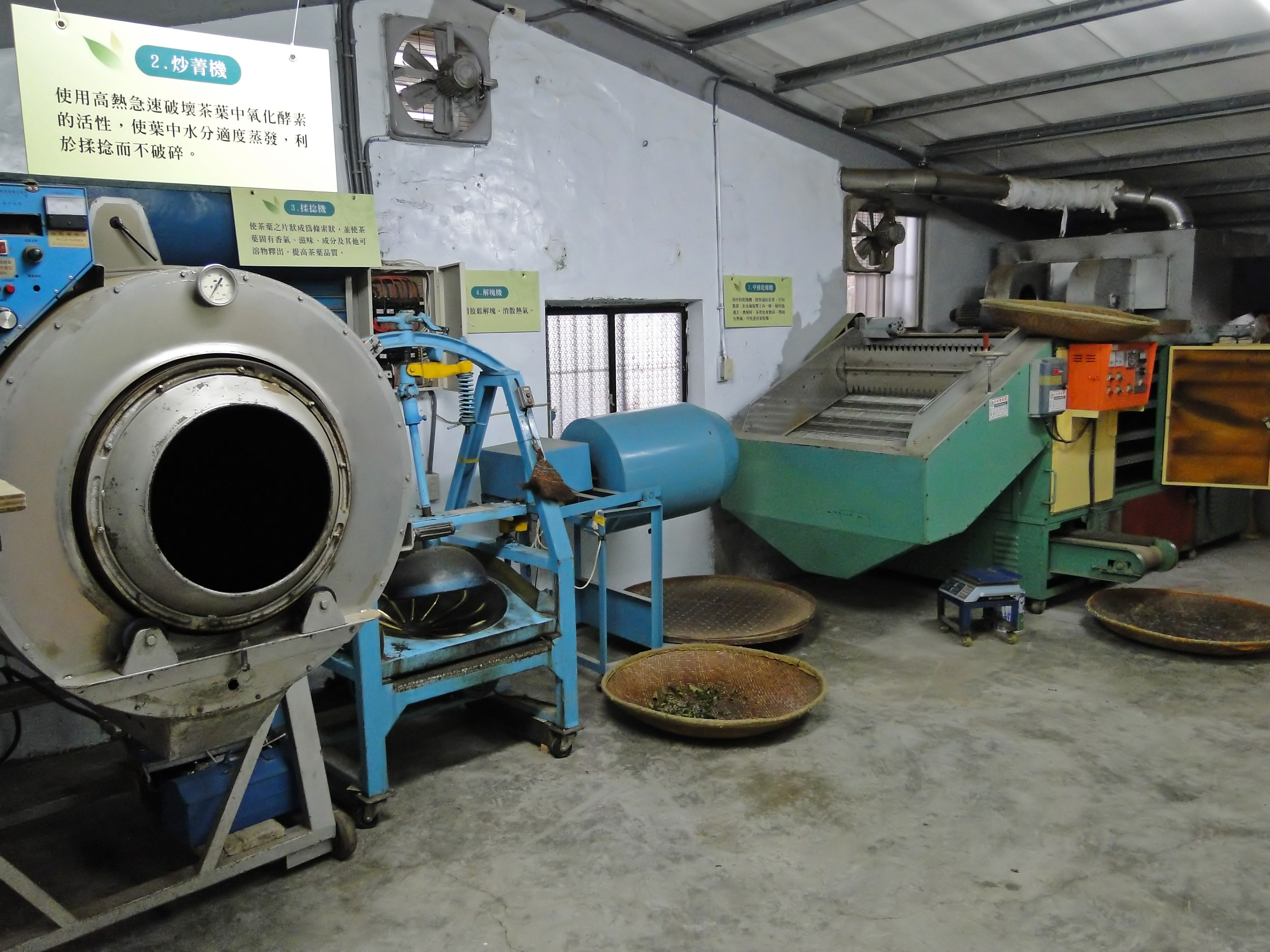
Tea factory in Taiwan

Tea is the most consumed manufactured drink in the world, equalling all others combined, including coffee, soft drinks, and alcohol. Most tea consumed outside East Asia is produced on large plantations in the hilly regions of India and Sri Lanka and is destined to be sold to large businesses. Opposite this large-scale industrial production are many small "gardens," sometimes minuscule plantations, that produce highly sought-after teas prized by gourmets.

India is the world's largest tea-drinking nation, although the per capita consumption of tea remains a modest 750 grams (26 oz) per person every year. Turkey, with 2.5 kilograms (5 lb 8 oz) of tea consumed per person per year, is the world's greatest per capita consumer.

=== Certification ===
Several bodies independently certify the production of tea, such as Rainforest Alliance, Fairtrade, UTZ Certified, and Organic. From 2008 to 2016, sustainability standards-certified tea production experienced a compound annual growth rate of about 35%, accounting for at least 19% of overall tea production. In 2016, at least 1.15 million tonnes of sustainably certified tea was produced, valued at US$2 billion.

Rainforest Alliance certified tea is sold by Unilever brands Lipton and PG Tips in Western Europe, Australia and the U.S. Fairtrade certified tea is sold by a large number of suppliers around the world. UTZ Certified tea is sold by Pickwick tea.

== Contemporary issues ==
=== Effects of climate change ===
The effects of climate change on tea crops have been widely investigated and include yield losses, negative effects on regional economies, and changes in tea taste, aroma, texture, colour that affect market prices, and consumer demand. Climate change affects the quantity of tea farmers are able to grow by influencing precipitation levels, increasing temperatures, encouraging insect pests, and shifting the timing of growing seasons. This happens differently in different regions. China and India—two of the largest producers—are both experiencing shorter growing seasons, heatwaves, and exposure of crops to hot spells.

To reduce the effects of climate change, tea famers are turning to agroforestry, soil enrichment through the incorporation of legumes, growing tea plants from seed, soil conservation methods, and new varieties of tea that have adaptations.

Additional research is needed to explore the synergistic effects of multiple climate stressors on tea and in underrepresented regions such as Africa and Southeast Asia. To further the research agenda, scholars note the importance of emerging molecular technologies and information tools for modelling and simulation. Agroforestry and modern technologies for soil management "can improve nitrogen use efficiency, reduce greenhouse gas emissions, and support sustainable tea cultivation" alongside socioeconomic research to ensure farmers can access such technologies and remain economically viable.

=== Safety ===
Tests of common teas have detected residues of banned toxic pesticides. Additionally, tests have indicated contamination of heavy metals and toxic elements in some brewed teas, some having a proportional relationship between the concentration of contaminants and steeping time. Another study indicated that heavy metals in commercial teas are tightly bound to tea leaves, with a minor amount leeching off into the water while brewing.

=== Fraud ===
Tea is a common target of food fraud. Lower cost ingredients may be substituted for tea, or a tea may be adulterated with undeclared and possibly toxic colors and flavours. The origin of the tea, picking season, and the processing techniques may be intentionally misidentified. Tea powders which undergo additional processing are more susceptible to food fraud.

=== Labour ===
Tea production in Kenya, Malawi, Rwanda, Tanzania, and Uganda uses child labour, according to the U.S. Department of Labor's List of Goods Produced by Child Labor or Forced Labor. Workers who pick and pack tea on plantations in developing countries can face harsh working conditions and may earn below the living wage. In countries such as Bangladesh, trade unions such as the Bangladesh Tea Workers Women's Forum, led by Gita Rani Kanu, have emerged to campaign for better working conditions for tea workers.

== See also ==
- Builder's tea
- Chaiwala
- Frederick John Horniman
- Indian Tea Association
- International Tea Day
- ISO 3103, a standardized method for brewing tea
- List of tea companies
- Phenolic content in tea
- Ryukyuan tea ceremony
- Tea classics, historical monographs of East Asian tea
- Tea leaf grading
- Tea pet
- Tea strainer
- Tea tasting
- Teasmade

Other drinks

- Burmese milk tea
- Butterfly pea flower tea
- Cannabis tea
- Chifir', Russian extra-strong tea brew
- Herbal tea
- Kombucha, a fermented tea drink
- List of Chinese teas
- List of hot beverages
- List of national drinks
- Maghrebi mint tea
- Mushroom tea
- Yaupon tea

Other

- Wikipedia:Teahouse
