= Ryukyuan tea ceremony =

Tea ceremony in Ryukyu Islands, Japan

Ryukyuan tea ceremony is a tea ceremony popular in the Ryukyu Islands (the Amami Islands in Kagoshima Prefecture and the Okinawa Prefecture, Japan). Ryukyuan tea ceremony is influenced by both Chinese tea ceremony and Japanese tea ceremony. Based on the unique taste of tea drinking, the unique tea culture of the Ryukyu Islands has been formed. Although there are imports from Japan and China, Ryukyu also produces tea and tea sets locally, providing conditions for the consumption of tea by the Ryukyu people. This tea-drinking preference of drinking both Japanese and Chinese teas is believed to be the foundation of Ryukyu's unique tea culture.

== History ==
After the 14th century, cultural relics related to tea culture began to appear in the Ryukyu Islands. There are at least 63 unearthed sites of tea sets that can be confirmed, and 10 sites where whole sets of tea sets were unearthed. The 10 sites include large palace castles such as Nakijin Castle, Urasoe Castle and Shuri Castle, temples such as Tenjie Temple and Enkaku Temple, as well as some official kilns for firing pottery. The earliest record of the Ryukyu tea ceremony in the literature was Chen Kan, an emissary of the Ming Dynasty who came to Ryukyu in 1534, and described the tea ceremony of Tenjie Temple and Enkaku Temple. In 1623, the Ryukyu Kingdom introduced tea trees from Kyushu Island, and in the second half of the 17th century, Ochaya was built in Shuri. Shō Shōken listed twelve skills, including tea ceremony, as skills that officials must learn. In 1731, tea trees from Fujian, China, were introduced to the Ryukyu Islands.

Porcelain firing technology from the Korean Peninsula was introduced to the Ryukyu Kingdom in the 17th century, and Yukada-yaki and Mingyaki began to appear in Ryukyu. In 1682, Tsuboya-yaki, which integrated them, appeared. Tsuboya-yaki is a typical Ryukyu pottery and is a product of official kilns, generally unglazed and rough. The most common Ryukyu tea set is the tea bowl. In Ryukyu at that time, tea sets from Japan, China and local Ryukyu coexisted.

Between 1767 and 1778, Ryukyu imported medium-quality tea from Fuzhou five times, the largest amount being 21,744 jin (about 13 tons) in 1767, and the average about 16,000 jin (about 9,600 kg). Between 1776 and 1874, many higher quality teas were imported, the largest amount being 72,000 jin (about 43.2 tons) in 1837. The import of Japanese tea to Ryukyu began in the early 17th century, especially the begma tea, which was regarded as a gift. The 1854 document records Chinese and Japanese teas such as Qingming tea, Wuyi tea, Pekoe Wuyi tea, pine tea, fir tea. Tea, it can be seen that Japanese tea ceremony and Chinese tea ceremony coexist in Ryukyu.

== Procedures ==
Ryukyu tea is mainly jasmine tea with a strong jasmine scent and "Ryukyu Bubble Tea" which is popular in modern times. The production method of Ryukyu bubble tea is slightly different from the Japanese tea ceremony. People pour the tea leaves mixed with powdered brown rice into a bowl and whisk quickly with a spoon to release air bubbles.

When drinking tea, first place the tea on your lap, then while holding the bowl lightly with your right hand, lift and lift it with your left hand. Hold it up to your chest and turn the bowl counterclockwise about a quarter of a turn. Eat the foam on top before drinking the tea to avoid the foam remaining in the bowl. It expresses the power and beauty of the Ryukyu tea ceremony "Tea Zen One Taste".
