= Hōjicha =

Japanese charcoal-roasted green tea

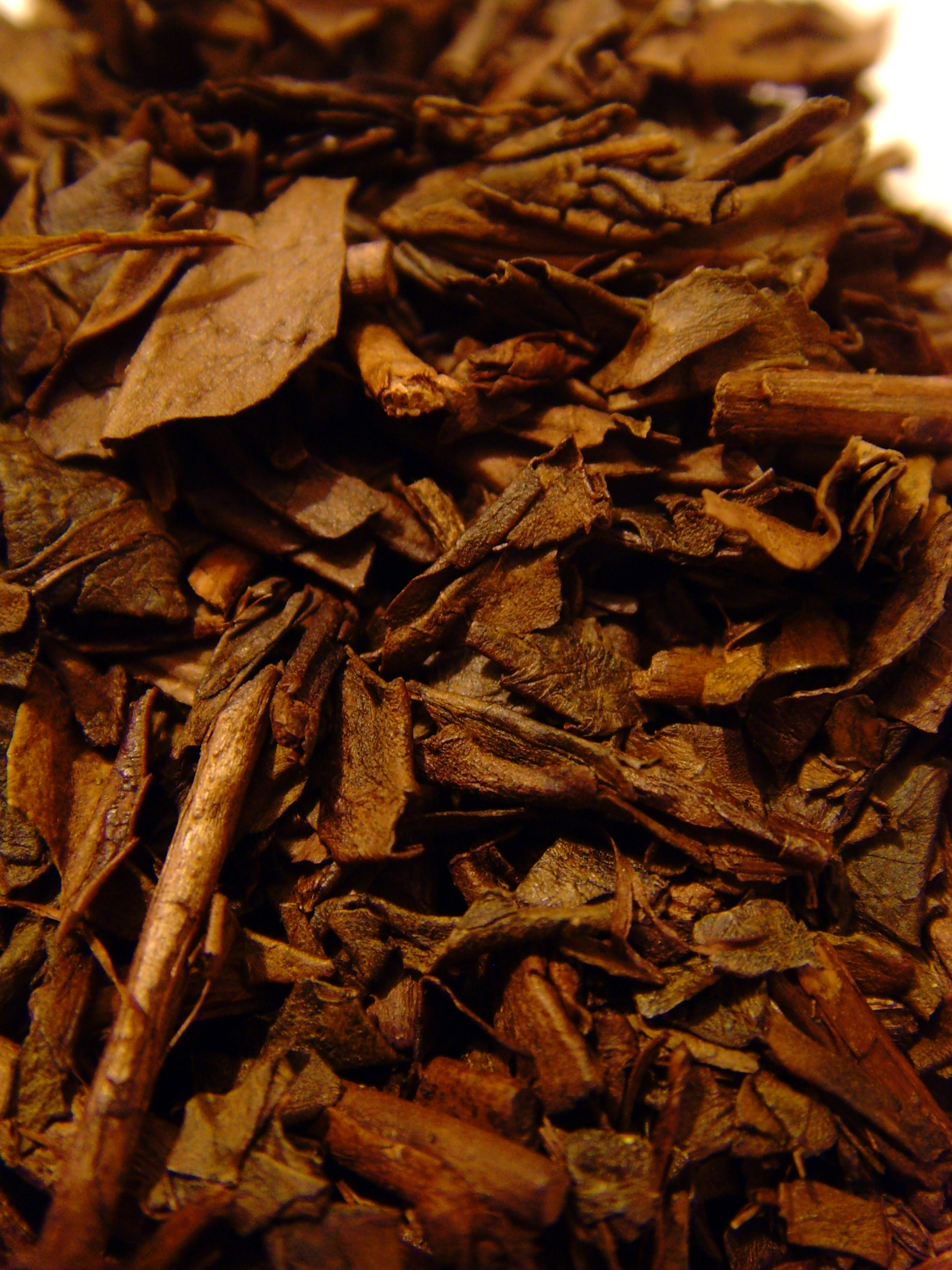
- Type: Green
- Other names: hōji-cha, houjicha, pan-fried / oven roasted tea
- Origin: Japan
- Quick description: Popular in Japan; roasted bancha or kukicha tea, often used as an after-dinner tea
- Temperature: 82 °C (180 °F)
- Time: 30 sec to 3 minutes

Hōjicha (ほうじ茶, 焙じ茶; lit. 'roasted tea'; sometimes romanized as houjicha) is a type of Japanese green tea. It is distinctive from other Japanese green teas because it is roasted in a porcelain pot over charcoal. It is roasted at 150 °C (302 °F) to prevent oxidation and produce a light golden colour, as opposed to other Japanese teas which are steamed. In general, the base of a hōjicha consists of leaves from the second harvest or after.

== Description ==
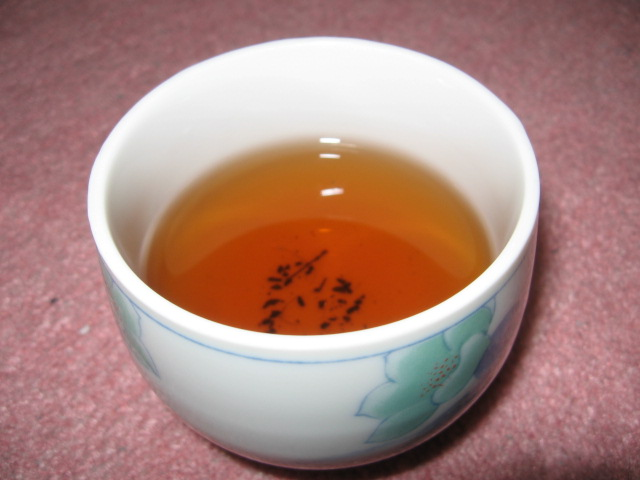
A cup of prepared hōjicha, showing the distinctive golden colour

=== Visual appearance ===
Dry hōjicha tea leaves are brown wedge-shaped needles. The tea is fired at a high temperature, altering the leaf colour tints from green to reddish-brown.

Infusions have a distinctive clear red appearance and nutty fragrance. Hojicha is sometimes sold in a powdered form and used to make steamed milk drinks.

=== Taste ===
Once infused, hōjicha has a nutty, toasty, sweet flavor. The tea has little to no bitterness.

Hōjicha has a mild, smoky flavour when brewed with water at 100 °C (212 °F).

=== As an ingredient ===
Hōjicha powder and tea leaves can be used to make many desserts: cookies, ice cream, roll cake, nama chocolate, muffins, oatmeal, tiramisu, flavoured bread, chiffon cake, pudding,, pancakes, bliss balls, affogato, latte, cheesecake, hot chocolate, jelly, brownies, hard candy, shave ice, and frozen yoghurt.

== History ==
The process of making hōjicha was discovered in 1920 by accident when a Kyoto merchant had unsaleable bancha, which is the lowest grade of sencha and is regarded as Japanese "everyday tea". By roasting the bancha, the merchant created a new flavor; hōjicha.

== Varieties ==
Hōjicha is often made from bancha (番茶 'common tea'), tea from the last harvest of the season. However, other varieties of hōjicha also exist, including a variety made from sencha and kukicha. Kukicha (also known as bōcha or 'twig tea') is made primarily from the twigs and stems of the tea plant rather than the leaves alone.

Hōjicha infusions have a light- to reddish-brown appearance and are less astringent. The lower levels of astringency in hōjicha are due to the tea losing catechins during the high-temperature roasting process.

The roasted flavours are extracted and dominate this tea: the roasting replaces the vegetative tones of other varieties of Japanese green tea with a toasty, slightly caramel-like flavour.

The roasting process used to make hōjicha also lowers the amount of caffeine in the tea. Because of its mildness, hōjicha is a popular tea to serve during the evening meal, before sleep, and preferred for children and the elderly.

== See also ==
- Bancha
- Japanese tea
- Kukicha
