= Kabusecha =

Class of Japanese tea leaf

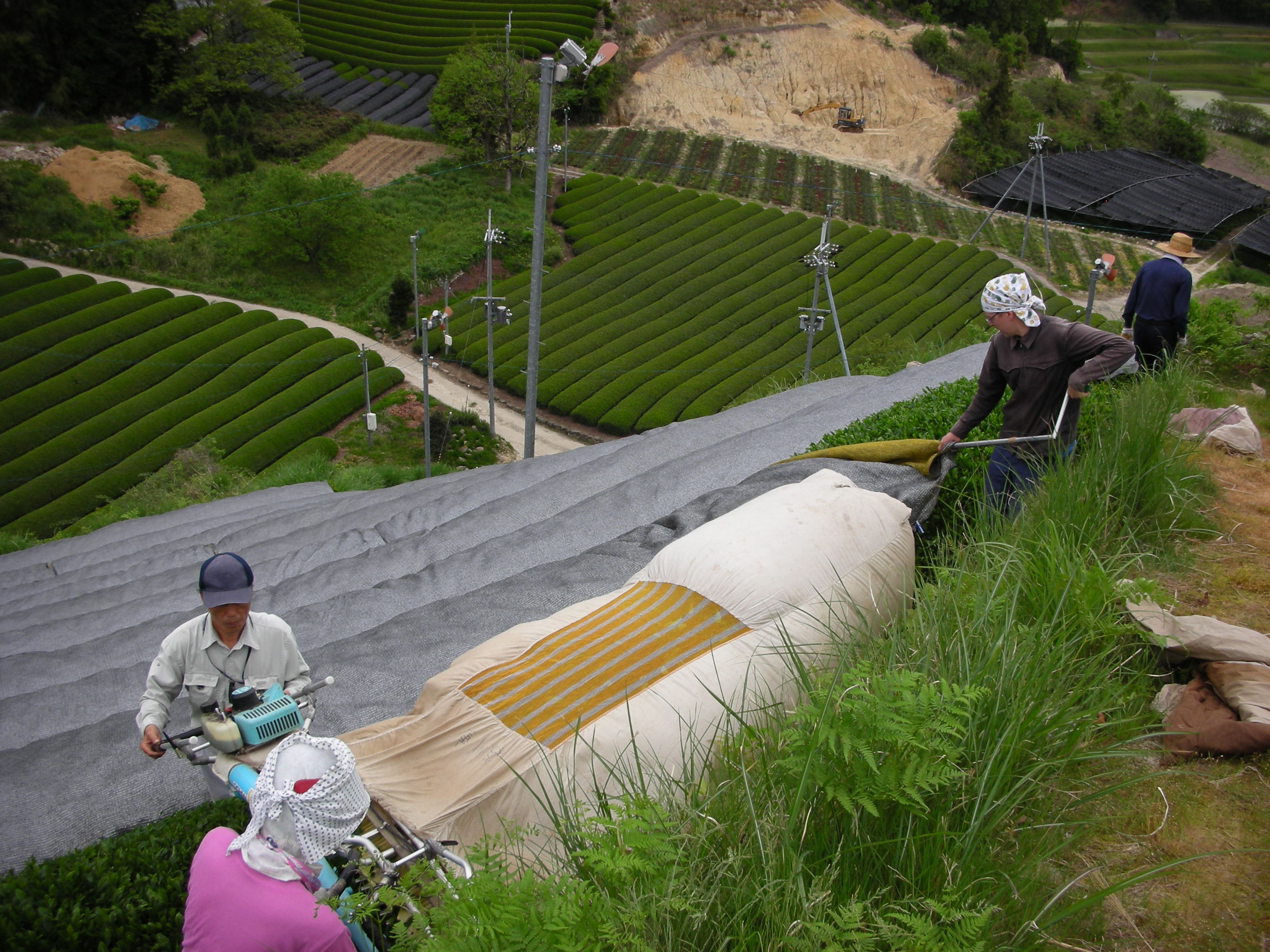
- Other names: Covered tea
- Origin: Japan
- Quick description: A tea leaf from a tea plant that has been covered for some period of time.

Kabuse tea, or kabusecha (かぶせ茶), is a class of Japanese tea leaf. Kabuseru (かぶせる) literally means to cover or place on top, as a hat on a head, therefore kabuse tea is a tea leaf harvested from a tea plant that, for some period of time ranging from 2–25 days, has had a porous material draped over the plant while the young leaves are being produced. Kabuse tea is almost exclusively a first flush tea. Though kabuse tea is usually processed into a green tea after picking, kabuse tea denotes a pre-picking process and the freshly picked leaf can be used to produce any kind of tea, from green tea to oolong tea to black tea, or other types.

== Background ==
Kabuse tea leaves are used to produce one of the three most expensive Japanese green teas (the others are gyokuro and matcha). These teas are made from leaves that are hand-plucked and grown in the shade. Shade grown leaves produce superior quality green tea—ooika is the Japanese term for the "covered aroma" of these teas, which are high in theanine and other amino acids that contribute to their distinctive flavor. Kabuse is shaded for a shorter time than gyokuro it is sometimes called a shade grown sencha. Studies have found considerable difference between the essential oils of kabuse-cha and normal sencha made from leaves grown unshaded in an open field. Kawakami and Yamanishi found that kabuse-cha contained large quantities of ionone series compounds.

The kabuse tea process was created to mimic the shading effect of the tanakake tea process used in the cultivation of tencha which is in turn the base for matcha. The term kabuse tea is used for marketing purposes for an above average quality green tea. The covering process is distressing for the plant and can result in damage or disease if not applied and maintained with proper care.

== See also ==
- Japanese tea
- History of tea in Japan
