= History of tea in Japan =

Aspect of Japanese history

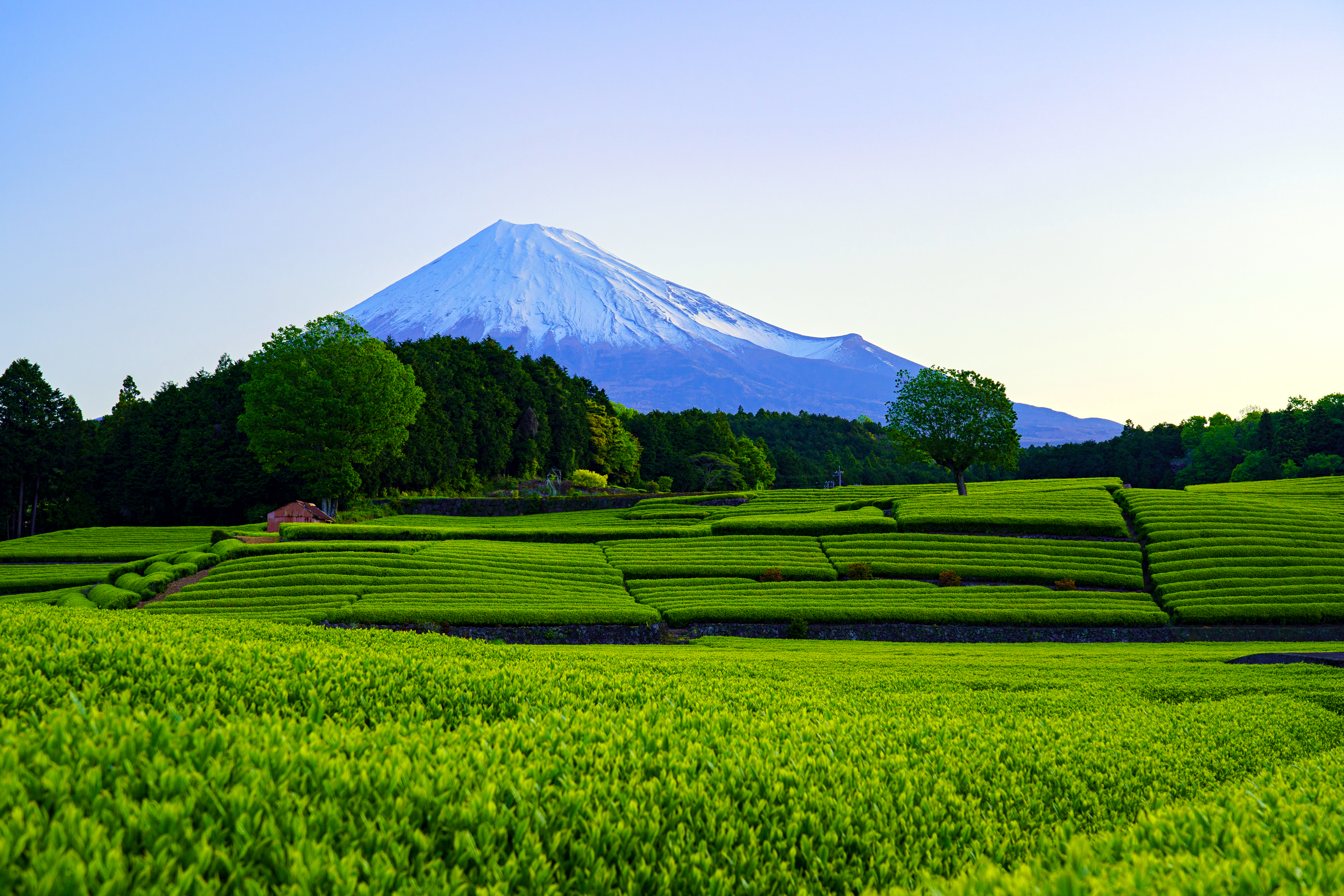
Tea plantation and Mount Fuji (Fuji City, Shizuoka Prefecture)

The history of tea in Japan began as early as the 8th century, when the first known references were made in Japanese records.

== Overviews ==
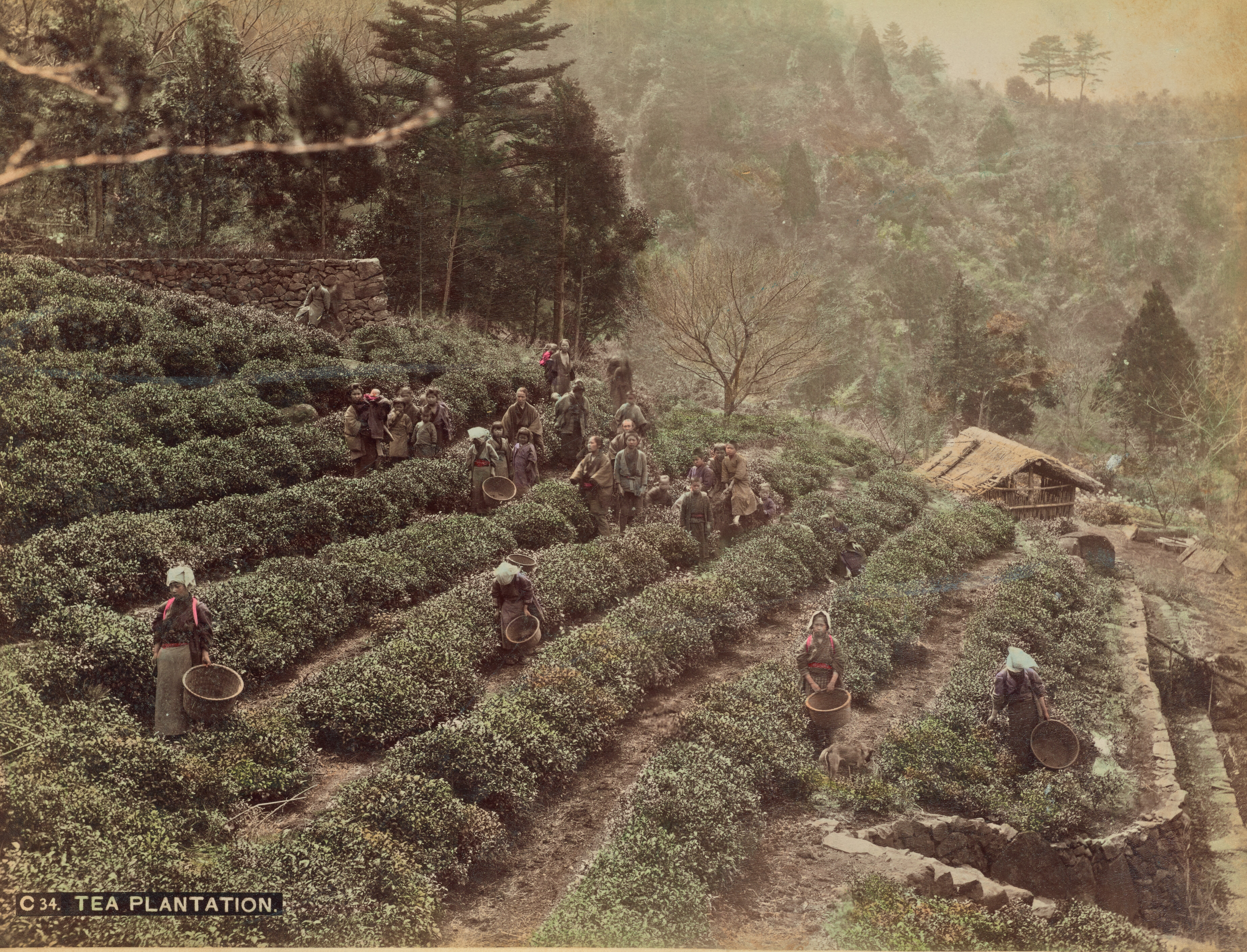
Workers harvesting tea from a Japanese plantation in the late 19th century

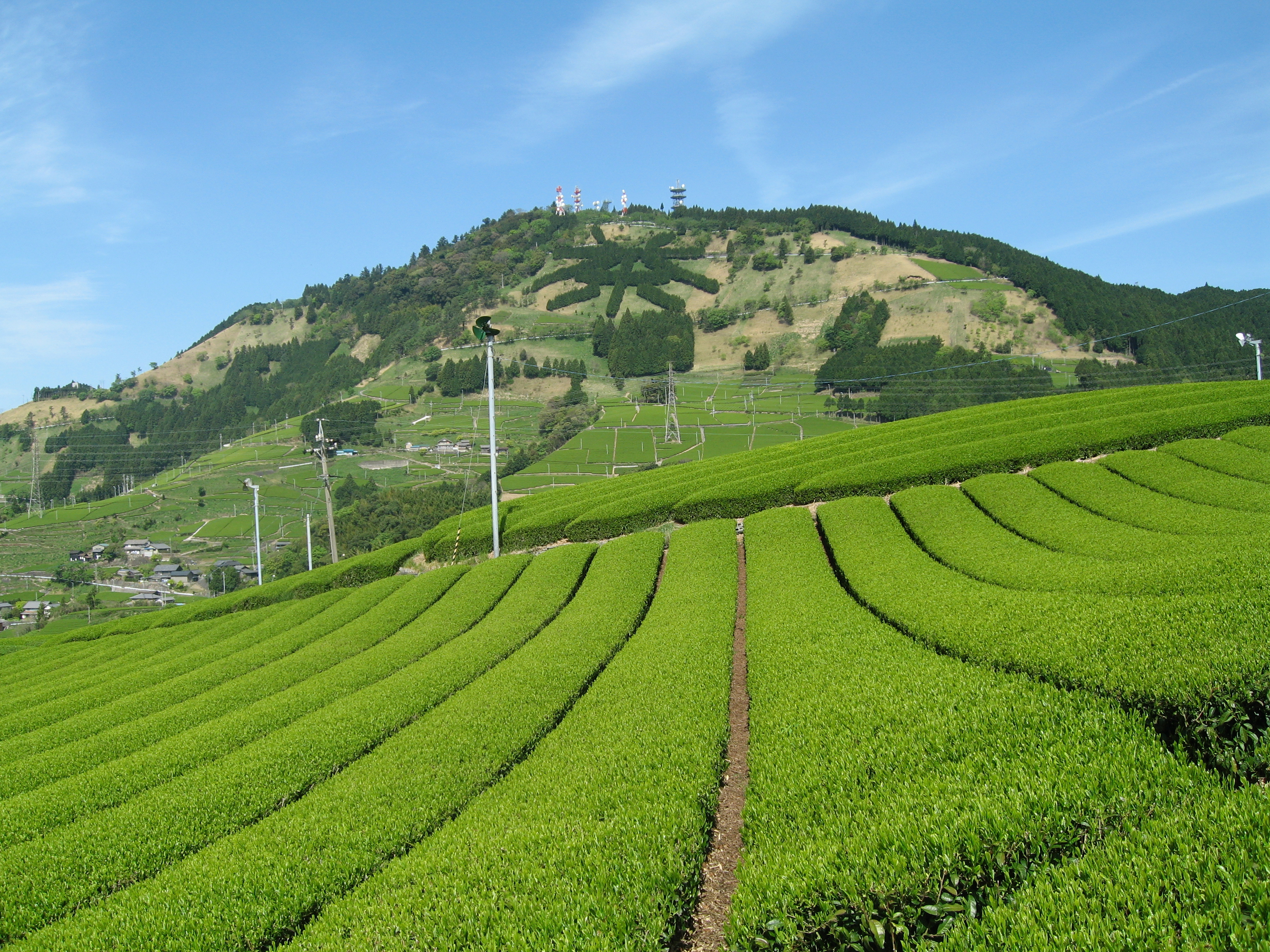
Plantation based on the traditional tea-grass integrated system (Kakegawa City, Shizuoka Prefecture)

Tea became a drink of the religious classes in Japan when Japanese priests and envoys sent to China to learn about its culture brought tea to Japan. The Buddhist monks Kūkai and Saichō may have been the first to bring tea seeds to Japan. The first form of tea brought from China was probably brick tea. Tea became a drink of the royal classes when Emperor Saga encouraged the growth of tea plants. Seeds were imported from China, and cultivation in Japan began.

Tea consumption became popular among the Heian gentry during the 12th century, after the publication of Eisai's Kissa Yōjōki. Uji, with its strategic location near the capital at Kyoto, became Japan's first major tea-producing region during this period. Beginning in the 13th and 14th centuries, Japanese tea culture developed the distinctive features for which it is known today, and the Japanese tea ceremony emerged as a key component of that culture.

In the following centuries, production increased and tea became a staple of the general public. The development of sencha in the 18th century led to the creation of distinctive new styles of green tea which now dominate tea consumption in Japan. In the 19th and 20th centuries, industrialization and automation transformed the Japanese tea industry into a highly efficient operation, capable of producing large quantities of tea despite Japan's limited arable land area.

== Early history ==
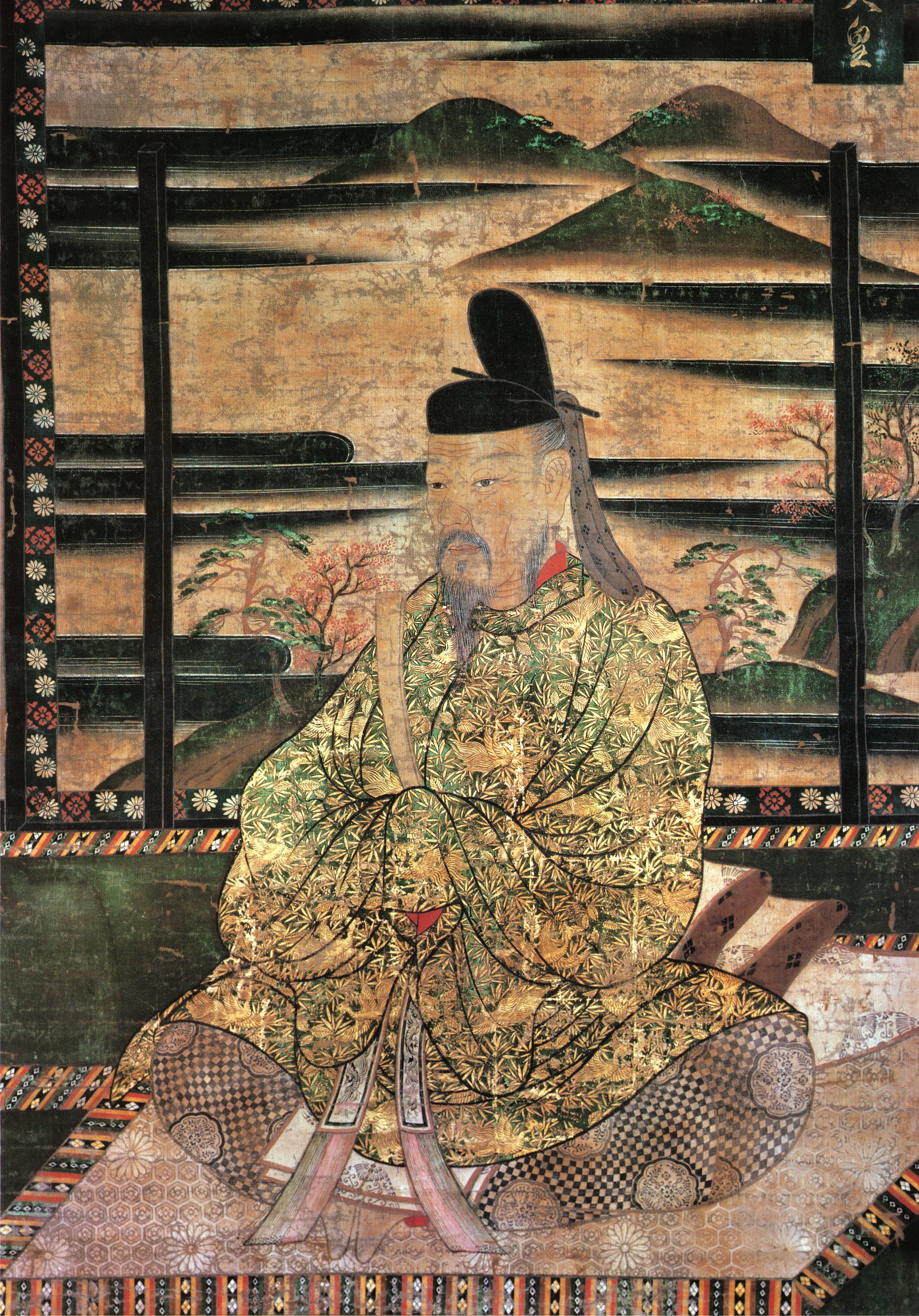
Emperor Saga (786–842; reigned 809–823)

The first Japanese contact with tea most likely occurred in the 8th century during the Nara period, when Japan sent several diplomatic missions to Chang'an, the capital of China's Tang dynasty. These early delegations brought back knowledge of Chinese culture and practices, as well as paintings, literature, and other artifacts. The Chakyō Shōsetsu indicates that Emperor Shōmu served powdered tea to a hundred monks in 729, but there is some uncertainty regarding the reliability of the text.

In 804, the Buddhist monks Kūkai and Saichō arrived in China to study religion as part of a government-sponsored mission during the Heian period. The Shōryōshū, written in 814, mentions that Kūkai drank tea during his time in China. He returned to Japan in 806. Kūkai is also the first to use the term chanoyu (茶の湯), which later came to refer specifically to the Japanese tea ceremony. Upon their return to Japan, Kūkai and Saichō founded the Shingon and Tendai schools of Buddhism, respectively. One or both of them are thought to have brought back the first tea seeds to Japan during this trip. Saichō, who returned in 805, is often credited for being the first to plant tea seeds in Japan, although the documentary evidence is uncertain.

The book Kuikū Kokushi records that in 815, a Buddhist abbot served tea to Emperor Saga. This is the earliest reliable reference to tea drinking in Japan. Subsequently, the emperor is said to have ordered the establishment of five tea plantations near the capital. The reign of Emperor Saga was characterized by his sinophilia, which included a passion for tea. He was fond of Chinese poetry, much of which praised the benefits of tea. Emperor Saga's poetry, and that of others at his imperial court, also make references to the drinking of tea.

Subsequent writings from the Heian period indicate that tea was cultivated and consumed on a small scale by Buddhist monks as part of their religious practice, and that the imperial family and members of the nobility also drank tea. The practice, however, was not yet popular outside these circles. In the three centuries after Emperor Saga's death, interest in Tang Chinese culture declined, as did the practice of drinking tea. Records from this period continued to recognize its value as a medicinal beverage and stimulant, and there are mentions of it being consumed with milk, a practice that subsequently died out.

The form of tea consumed in Japan at this time was most likely brick tea (団茶, dancha), which was the standard form in China during the Tang dynasty. The world's first monograph on tea, Lu Yu's The Classic of Tea, was written a few decades before the time of Kūkai and Saichō. In it, Lu Yu describes the process for steaming, roasting, and compressing the tea into bricks, as well as the process of grinding the tea into powder and stirring it to a froth in hot water prior to consumption. This procedure is thought to have evolved into the method of preparing powdered matcha that later emerged in Japan.

== Eisai and the popularization of tea ==
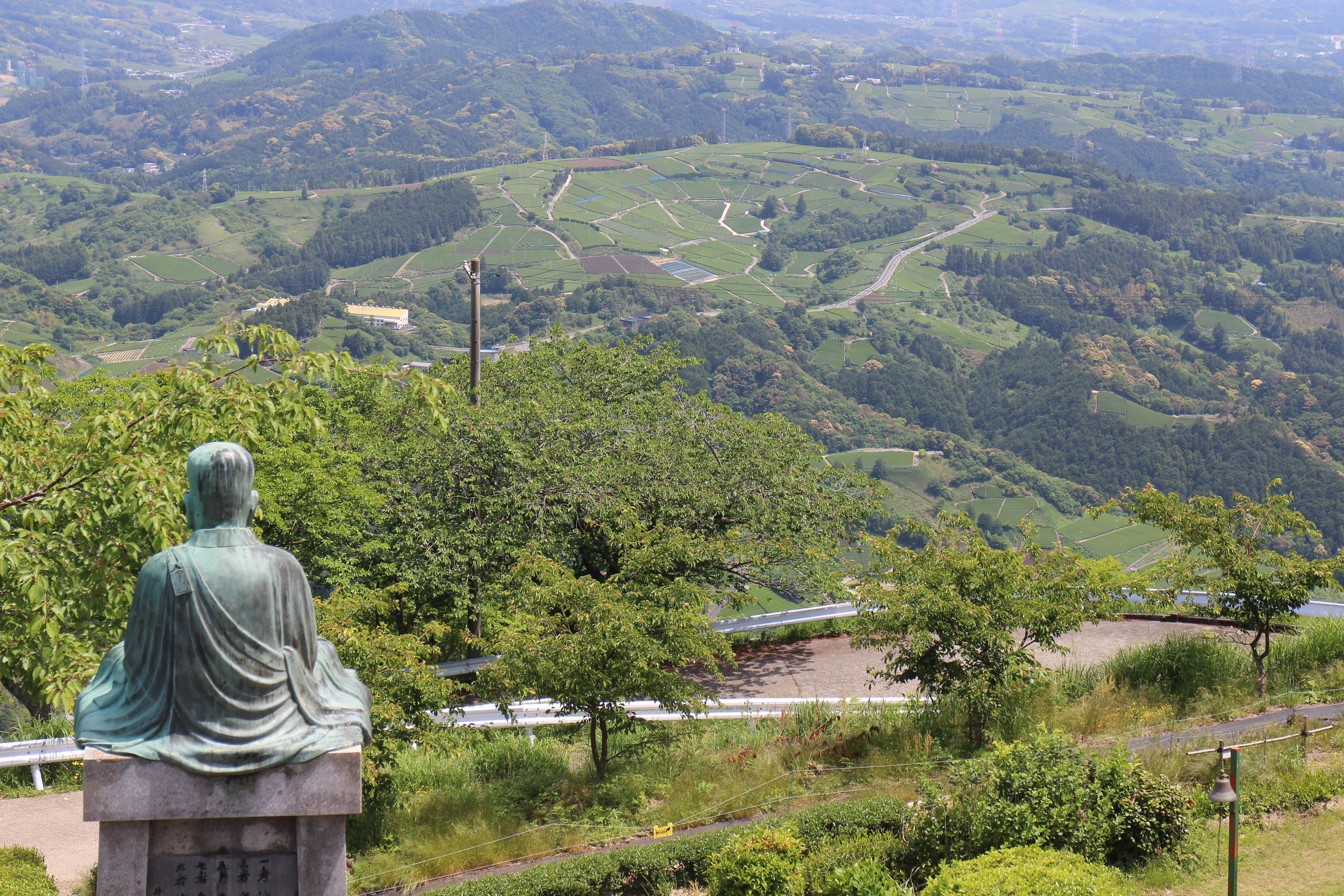
Tea plantation with the statue of Eisai (Kakegawa City, Shizuoka Prefecture)

The Zen monk Eisai, founder of the Rinzai school of Buddhism, is generally credited for popularizing tea in Japan. In 1191, Eisai returned from a trip to China and brought back tea seeds which he planted on the island of Hirado and in the mountains of Kyushu. He also gave some seeds to the monk Myōe, abbot of the Kōzan-ji temple in Kyoto. Myōe planted these seeds in Toganoo (栂尾) and Uji, which became the sites of the first large scale cultivation of tea in Japan. At first, Toganoo tea was seen as the finest in Japan and was called "real tea" (本茶, honcha), as opposed to "non-tea" (非茶, hicha) produced elsewhere in Japan. By the 15th century, however, Uji tea surpassed that of Toganoo, and the terms honcha and hicha came to refer to Uji tea and non-Uji tea, respectively.

In 1211, Eisai wrote the first edition of the Kissa Yōjōki (喫茶養生記; Drink Tea and Prolong Life), the first Japanese treatise on tea. The Kissa Yōjōki promotes the drinking of tea for health purposes. It opens with the statement that "Tea is the most wonderful medicine for nourishing one's health; it is the secret of long life." The preface describes how drinking tea can have a positive effect on the five vital organs (a concept in traditional Chinese medicine). Eisai subscribed to a theory that the five organs each preferred foods with different flavors, and he concluded that because tea is bitter, and "the heart loves bitter things", it would especially benefit the heart. Eisai goes on to list the many purported health effects of tea, which include curing fatigue, lupus, indigestion, beriberi disease, heart disease, and so on, in addition to quenching thirst. The Kissa Yōjōki also explains the shapes of tea plants, tea flowers and tea leaves and covers how to grow tea plants and process tea leaves. The treatise says little regarding the drinking of tea for pleasure, however, focusing instead on its medicinal value.

Eisai was instrumental in introducing tea consumption to the samurai class. He presented a version of his Kissa Yōjōki in 1214 to shōgun Minamoto no Sanetomo, who had been suffering from a hangover after drinking too much sake. Eisai also served tea to the young shōgun. Zen Buddhism, as advocated by Eisai and others, also became popular during this period, particularly among the warrior class. The Zen monk Dōgen promulgated a set of rules for Buddhist temples based on Rules of Purity for Chan Monasteries, a Chinese text of 1103. Dōgen's text included notes on etiquette for the serving of tea in Buddhist rituals. Tea was considered central to practitioners of Zen Buddhism. Musō Soseki went as far as to state that "tea and Zen are one".

Soon, green tea became a staple among cultured people in Japan—a brew for the gentry and the Buddhist priesthood alike. Production grew and tea became increasingly accessible, though still a privilege enjoyed mostly by the upper classes.

== Medieval tea culture ==
=== Tea competitions ===
In the 14th century, tea competitions (闘茶, tōcha) emerged as a popular pastime. Unlike tea competitions in China, the object of tōcha was to distinguish between tea grown in different regions, in particular between honcha and hicha. These events were known for their extravagant betting. Samurai Sasaki Dōyō was particularly famed for hosting such competitions, with lavish decoration, large quantities of food and sake, and dancing. This taste for the extravagant and the vulgar was known as basara (婆娑羅) and was the cause of some moral outrage among writers of the time. Also popular during this period was a passion for Chinese objects (唐もの, karamono), such as paintings, ceramics, and calligraphy.

=== Tea rooms and early chanoyu ===
In the 15th century, Shōgun Ashikaga Yoshimasa constructed the first tea room in the shoin chanoyu (reception room tea ceremony) style. This simple room in his retirement villa at Ginkaku-ji allowed the shōgun to display his karamono objects when holding tea ceremonies. The shoin style room developed from the study rooms of Zen monks. They featured wall-to-wall tatami covering in contrast to earlier plain wooden floors, and a shoin desk (writing desk) built into the wall. These rooms were the predecessors of modern Japanese living rooms. The austerity of this new style of tea room (茶室, chashitsu) is thought to have been a step towards the formal chanoyu tea ceremony that emerged later.

It is said that Yoshimasa's tea master was Murata Shukō, also known as Murata Jukō. Shukō is credited with developing the muted, "cold and withered" motifs of the Japanese tea ceremony. He advocated combining imported Chinese wares with rough ceramics made in Japan, in an effort to "harmonize Japanese and Chinese tastes". This intentional usage of simple or flawed utensils with a wabi aesthetic came to be referred to as wabicha. Shukō, however, did not embrace the idea of a fully wabi approach to chanoyu. By contrast, Takeno Jōō, who studied under one of Shukō's disciples, was dedicated to the elaboration of the wabi style in tea utensils as well as the decor of the tea room.

== The Japanese tea ceremony ==
=== Sen no Rikyū ===
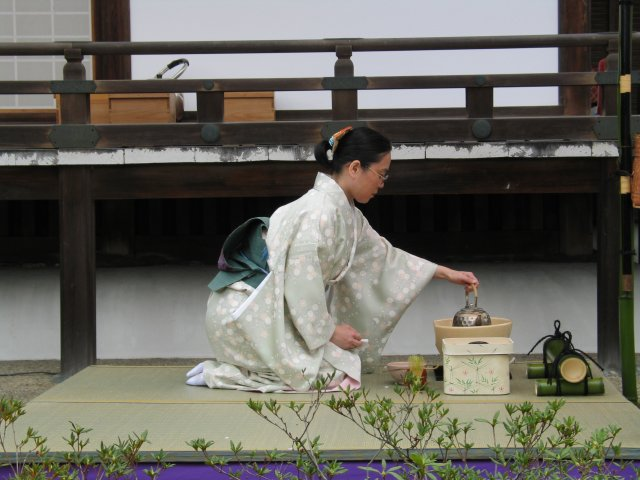
Japanese tea ceremony

The historical figure considered most influential in the development of the Japanese tea ceremony was Sen no Rikyū. Rikyū served as tea master to both daimyos Oda Nobunaga and Toyotomi Hideyoshi. He lived during the upheavals of the Sengoku period, in which political and social structures were radically transformed. Rikyū grew up in Sakai, where the wealthy merchant class was able to establish itself as a cultural and economic force capable of shaping Japanese tea culture. Rikyū, the son of a Sakai fish merchant, studied tea under Takeno Jōō. Like Jōō, he was a proponent of the wabi style of tea.

At this time, the tea ceremony played a prominent role in politics and diplomacy. Nobunaga went as far as to prohibit anyone other than his closest allies from practicing it. The austere wabicha style Rikyū advocated was less favored for these political gatherings than the more lavish mainstream style. After Nobunaga's death, Sen no Rikyū entered the service of Hideyoshi and constructed a simple wabi tea hut called Taian, which became one of Hideyoshi's favorite tea rooms. In contrast to the shingled roof preferred by Shukō, Rikyū specified a thatched roof. Called the "North Pole of Japanese aesthetics", this room exemplifies the rustic wabi style that came to dominate Japanese tea culture. In addition to the rustic tea room, Rikyū established the etiquette of the modern tea ceremony as well as the ordained procedure and the choice of utensils to be used. He also developed the idea of the nijiriguchi, a small entryway through which guests must crawl to enter the tea room.

Though Hideyoshi forced Rikyū to commit seppuku in 1591, Rikyū's descendants were allowed to continue in their profession. The three main schools of the traditional Japanese tea ceremony today, the Omotesenke, Urasenke, and Mushakōjisenke, were all founded by children of Sen no Sōtan, Rikyū's grandson.

=== Teaware ===
Developments in the Japanese tea ceremony during the Sengoku period motivated new trends in Japanese teaware. Rikyū's disciple Furuta Oribe served as Hideyoshi's tea master after Rikyū's death. Oribe's preference for green and black glazes and irregular shapes led to a new style of pottery called Oribe ware. Rikyū also influenced Japanese tastes in ceramics, rejecting the smooth regularity of Chinese-influenced tenmoku ware in favor of uneven rice bowls produced by ethnic Korean potters in Japan. This style of tea bowl or chawan was called raku ware after the name of the Korean potter who produced the first pieces for Rikyū's tea ceremonies, and is known for its appropriately wabi look and feel.

=== Matcha ===
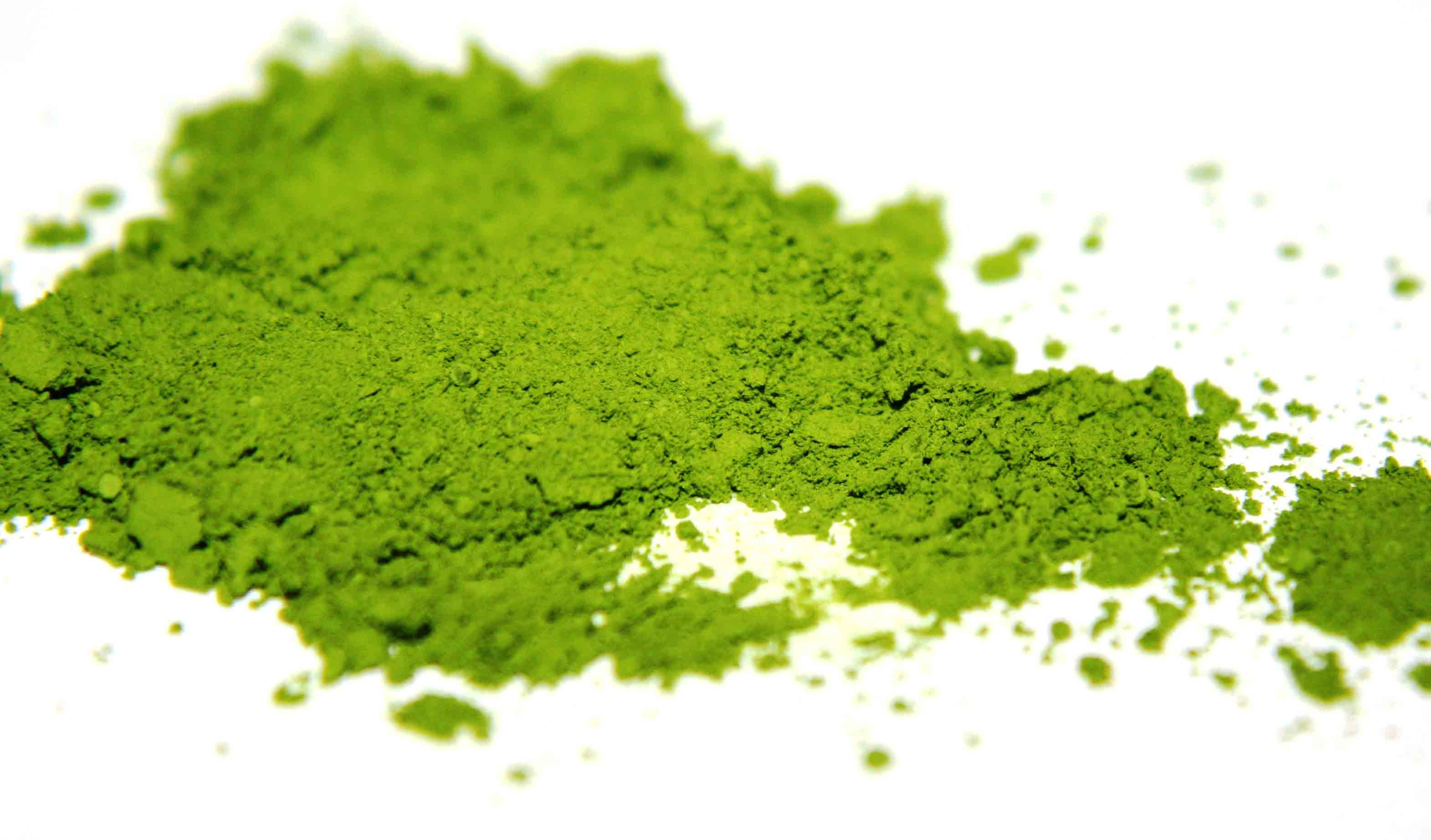
Matcha tea powder

Modern Japanese matcha is made by grinding loose dry tea leaves (rather than grinding the bricks of tea originally introduced from Song dynasty) into powder. Matcha's sweet flavor and deep green color are created by shading the tea leaves from the sun in the last weeks before plucking, increasing the chlorophyll and decreasing the tannin content of the leaves. This technique emerged in the 16th century among Uji tea growers. It is also used to produce gyokuro and kabuseicha.

== Edo period ==
Under the Tokugawa shogunate of Japan's Edo period (1603–1868), new forms of tea emerged, accompanied by new developments in tea culture. Influenced by China's Ming dynasty, steeped loose leaf tea emerged as an alternative to powdered tea, leading to the development of sencha.

=== Sencha ===
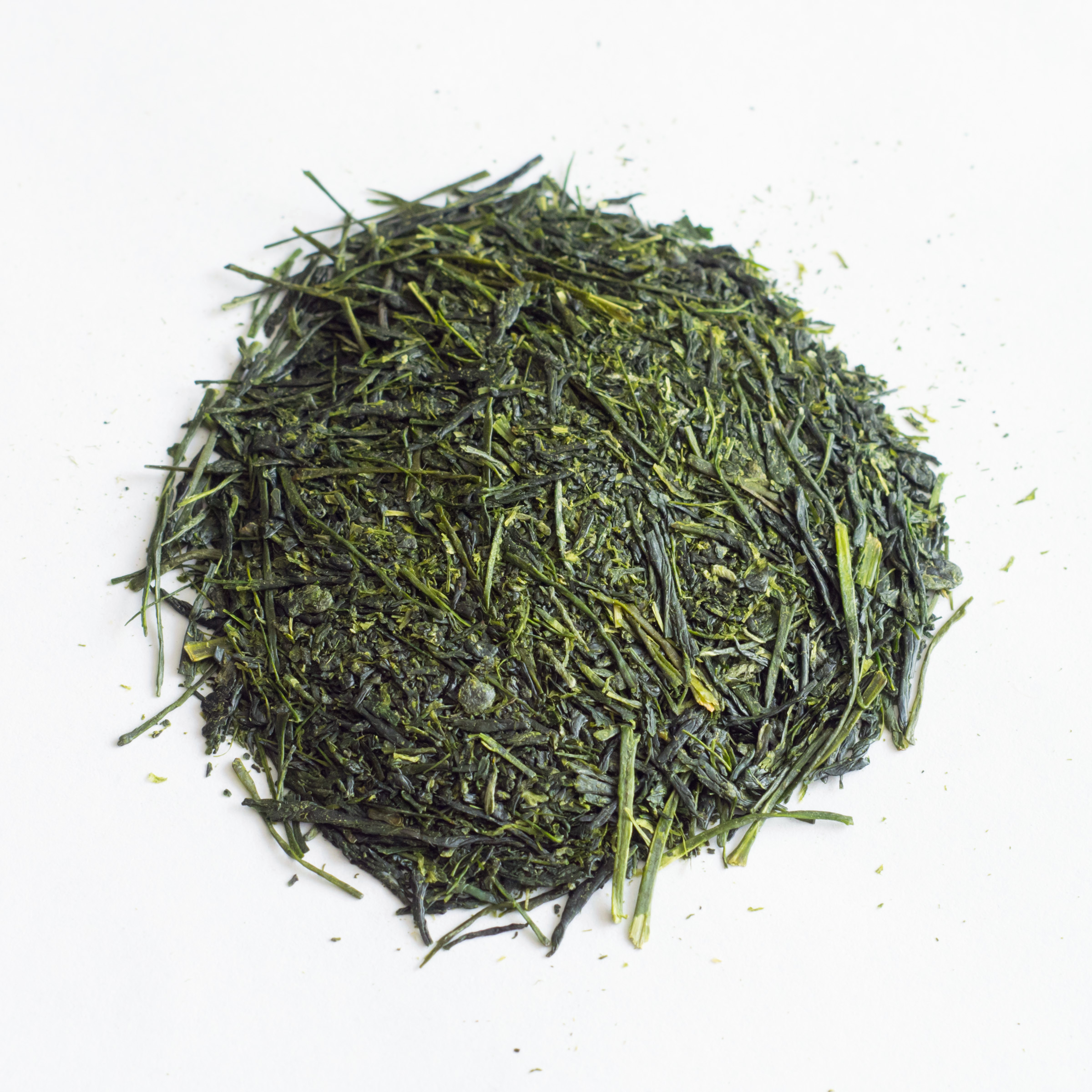
Sencha tea leaves

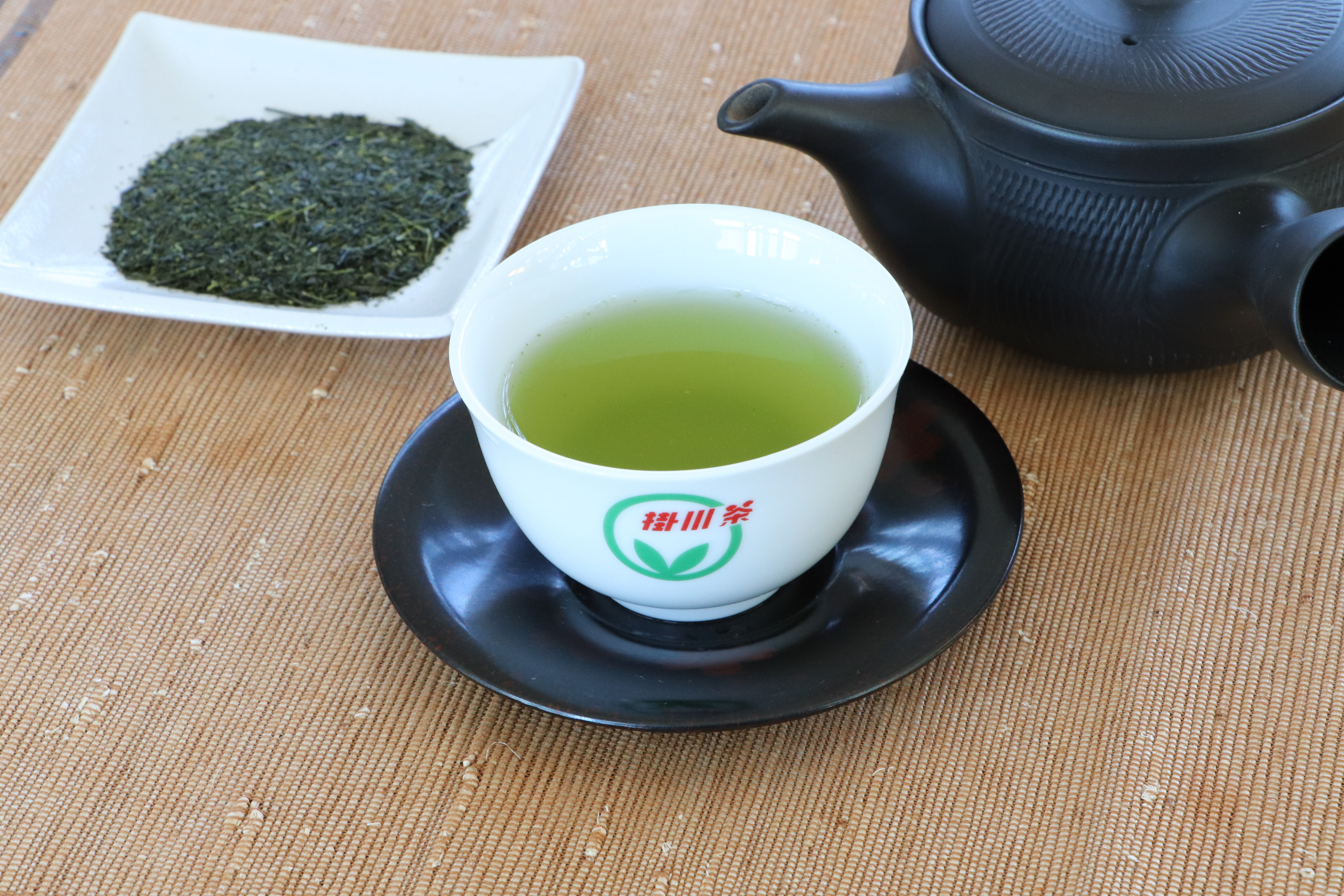
Fukamushi Sencha

By the 14th century, the practice of drinking powdered brick tea had fallen out of fashion in China. Instead, most tea was hand-fired over a dry wok to stop the process of oxidation and purchased as loose leaves rather than compressed bricks. At first, the loose leaves would still be ground into a powder and whisked with hot water to produce the finished beverage. By the late 16th century, however, tea connoisseurs were steeping the leaves in hot water in teapots and pouring the tea into teacups. This new way of producing and drinking tea arrived in Japan in the 17th century. Its advocates, most notably the monk Baisao, were opposed to the strict rituals of the traditional Japanese tea ceremony, which was based around the older practices of powdered tea. Instead, they promoted a carefree, informal approach to tea, inspired by ancient Chinese sages and the scholar-recluse tradition.

The method of steeping loose tea leaves in hot water came to be known as "boiled tea" (煎茶, sencha), and it soon led to a new way of producing green tea that would work well with this technique. In 1737, an Uji-based tea grower named Nagatani Sōen developed what is now the standard process for making leaf teas in Japan: tea leaves are first steamed, then rolled into narrow needles and dried in an oven. The process imparts a vivid emerald color to the leaf, along with a "clean", sometimes sweet flavor. Nagatani's tea caught the attention of Baisao, becoming synonymous with the sencha method of steeping tea. It thereafter came to be known by the same name. Sencha grew in popularity over time and is now the most popular form of tea in Japan, representing 80 percent of all tea produced each year.

== Automation ==
At the end of the Meiji era (1868–1912), machine manufacturing of green tea was introduced and began replacing handmade tea. Machines took over the processes of primary drying, tea rolling, secondary drying, final rolling, and steaming.

In the 20th century, automation contributed to improved quality and reduced labour. Sensor and computer controls were introduced to machine automation so workers can more easily produce superior tea without compromising quality.

Automation has also taken over sectors of the growing and harvesting of tea in Japan. On the steep hillsides there is a mechanical harvester operated by 2 people at each end of the tea tree. The harvesting machine trims the leaves and collects them in a bag affixed to the machine. On flat fields there are riding-type harvester tractors which can harvest well maintained tea plantations within 1mm of accuracy. In Kagoshima prefecture some of these tractors have been affixed with computers and sensors that allow the harvester to be operated autonomously.

== See also ==
- Tea culture in Japan, about Tea in Japan
- Japanese tea ceremony
