= Karigane =

Karigane (alternatively spelt 雁, 雁金, 雁ヶ音, 雁ケ音, or 雁が音) is a Japanese word meaning "cry of the wild goose" or "wild goose", and may refer to:

- Karigane (tea), a kind of kukicha (twig green tea)
- Mitsubishi Ki-15 Karigane, a Japanese military plane of the 1930s and 1940s

It is also used as a family name, including:

- Karigane Junichi (1879–1959) 雁金 準一 – a Japanese Go player
