= Tamaryokucha =

Japanese green tea

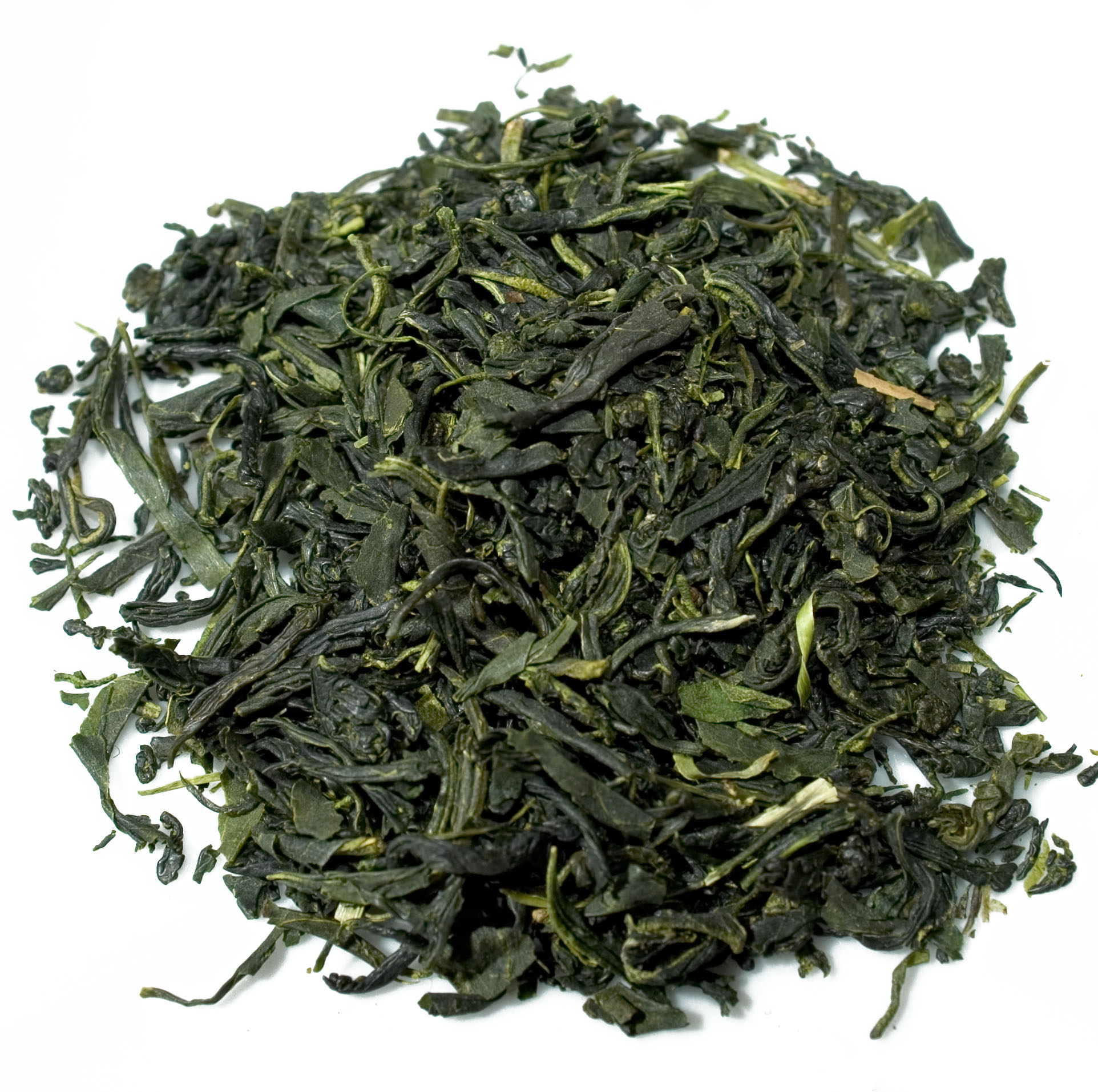
- Type: Green
- Other names: Guricha
- Origin: Japan
- Quick description: Milder and less astringent than a typical Japanese green tea.

The tamaryokucha (Japanese: 玉緑茶, coiled tea) is a fine Japanese green tea, also commonly known as guricha (ぐり茶, curly tea). It has a tangy, berry-like taste, with a long almondy aftertaste and a deep aroma with tones of citrus, grass, and berries.

It can be processed in one of two ways to destroy the enzymes: pan fried (rarely used in Japan, it is the Chinese process), or steamed (as most Japanese teas). Many believe that steaming preserves the vitamins and antioxidants better than pan-frying. The taste varies between the two as well. The pan-fried version has more of an aroma of cooked vegetables. In both cases, the leaves are then rolled into "comma" shapes (instead of being kneaded into "needle" shapes, like sencha teas).

It is produced in the Kyūshū area. The tea is golden yellow and it should be steeped at 70 °C (160 °F) for about two minutes or 80 °C (175 °F) for about one minute. The caffeine level is normal for green tea and it can be drunk throughout the day. It can be reinfused, with a slightly different taste.

The name tama-ryoku-cha means "coiled-green-tea" (tama being "ball, jewel" but becoming the attributive "coiled, rolled" here), and guri-cha means "curly-tea" (guri being the name of a classic Japanese decorative pattern, of curly appearance). Both names refer to the comma-shaped, coiled leaves.

== See also ==
- List of Japanese teas
- Tea Culture in Japan
