= Kimura Kenkadō =

Japanese scholar, artist and art connoisseur

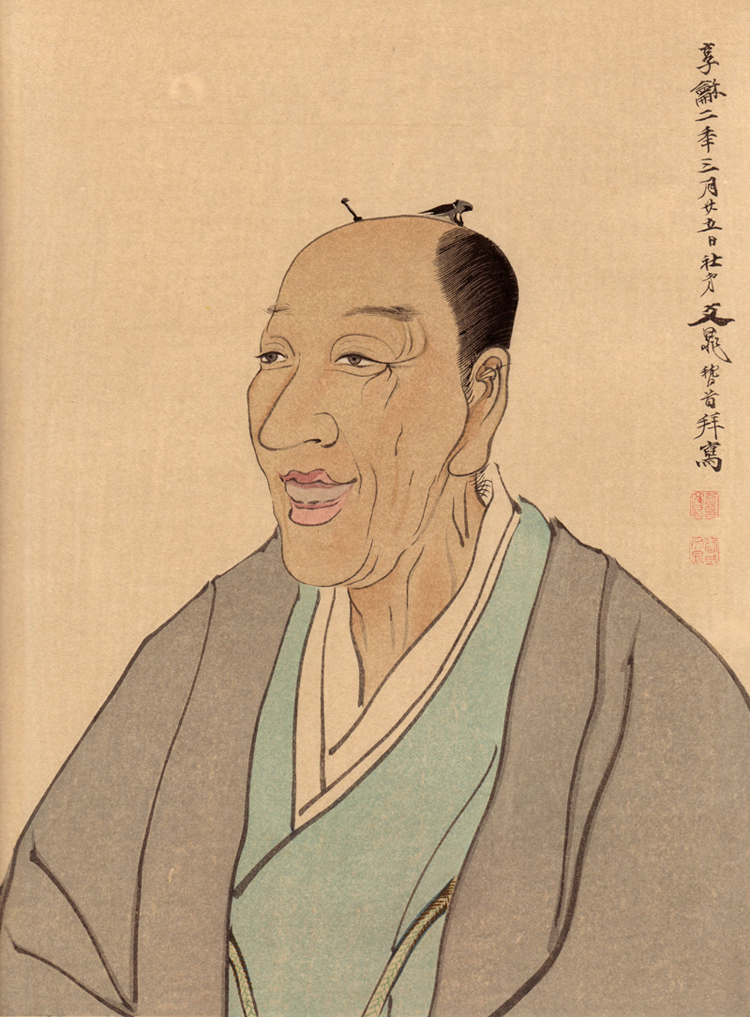
A portrait of Kimura by Tani Bunchō

Kimura Kenkadō (木村 蒹葭堂, a.k.a. Sonsai, Tsuboiya Takichiro, 1736–1802) was a Japanese scholar, artist and art connoisseur.

Kimura's family were sake merchants, and he followed the family trade, but was obliged to move into the stationery business after being convicted of excessive alcohol production. At an early age, Kimura was trained in painting by Ōoka Shunboku and Yanagisawa Kien. He also studied the natural sciences, learning from Tsushima Tsunenoshin and Ono Ranzan. After retiring to Ise, he spent his time collecting objets d'art and painting, earning a reputation as a capable landscape painter of the nanga school under the pen-name Sonsai. His collection was highly respected, and was purchased by the Japanese government after his death for the considerable sum of 500 ryō.

Kimura was also a devotee of the tea ceremony, which he studied under Baisao; Kimura himself was largely responsible for codifying the use of utensils and the processes for the sencha ceremony.
