= Yamecha =

Tea produced in Fukuoka Prefecture, Japan

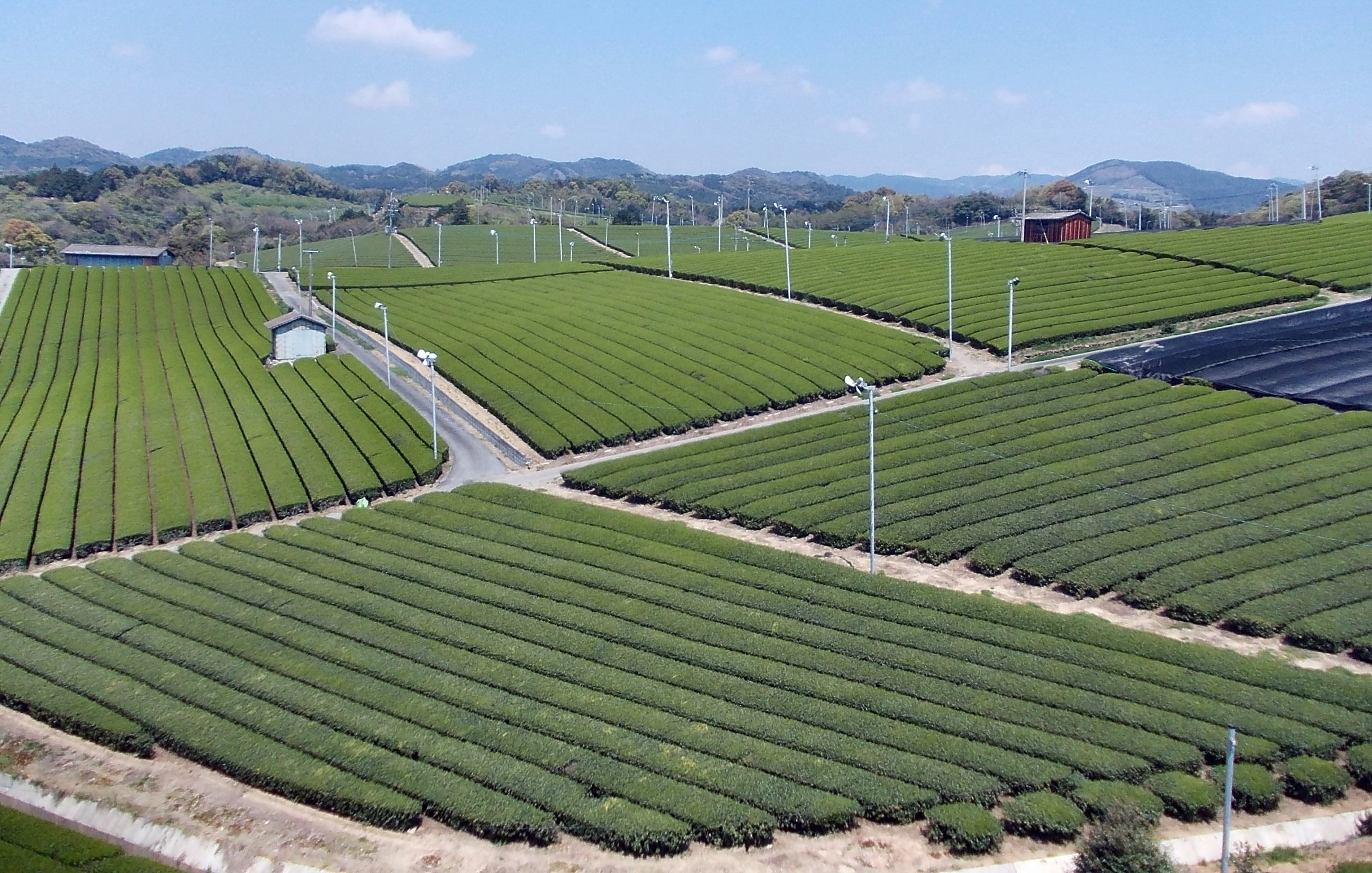
Yamecha tea plantation on Yame, Fukuoka, Japan

Yamecha is a type of tea produced in Fukuoka Prefecture in Japan. It is cultivated in Yame-shi and its surrounding areas: Chikugo-shi, Hirokawa-cho, Ukiha-shi, and Asakura-shi. Yamecha makes up about 3% of Japan's green tea production and about 45% of Japan's gyokuro production on an annual basis. It is highly prized and one of the first regions in Japan to grow tea. The first tea plant in Yame was imported from China by a Zen priest named Eirin Suzui.

== Regional Characteristics ==
The southern part of the Chikushi Plains is located in Yame-shi, where the Chikugo and Yabegawa rivers deposit rich sediment full of composted leaves. The Chikushi Plains is a region that has been famous for its tea cultivation since ancient times. It is the largest plain in Kyūshū and is located in the southern part of Fukuoka, extending to the Chikugo and Yabegawa river basins. Yamecha is cultivated on roughly 1560 hectares of land, 90% of which is located in Yame-shi.

The climate is highly suitable for growing tea with high temperatures during the day that fall dramatically at night; a peculiar characteristic of inland regions. It receives 1600-2400mm of rain a year, and has weather that is similar to that of Mt. Lingyan in Suzhou, China. Fog and mist are a common occurrence in the mornings and around the rivers of this region. Many Yamecha fields are situated on gently-sloping mountain faces, which are often shrouded in fog. This environment helps shield the tea leaves from harsh sunlight and produce a richer flavour. As a result, Yamecha is high in flavour-producing compounds such as theanine, glutamic acid, and arginine. Many tests on tea cultivated in this area have shown to produce a strong, sweet body.

== Types ==
Cultivars of Yamecha include yabukita, kanayamidori, okumidori, saemidori, yamakai, samidori, okuyutaka, gokou, and asatsuyu. 77% of introduced cultivars are yabukita, 4% are kanayamidori, 4% are okumidori, 3% are saemidori, and 2% are yamakai.

The natural gyokuro produced here has been prized since ancient times. Yamecha Gyokuro makes up about 45% of all gyokuro production in Japan. As a result, its growers have control over the average price of gyokuro. Yamecha Gyokuro is well known in Japan for its high quality.

== History ==
1406: Tea was brought to modern day Yame-shi by Eirin Suzui, a Zen priest. Eirin founded Reiganji Temple and planted the first tea seeds in this region.

1751-1788: Wild tea on mountains in Yame became a point of interest for locals who began harvesting it for profit.

1863: Sales and demand for Yamecha increased as foreign traders in Nagasaki Prefecture began buying it.

1887: Sales of Yamecha dropped overseas due to stricter quality control laws of imported goods in the United States. Types of Yamecha could no longer be imported to the United States.

1914-1937: Yamecha tea farms became part of a reform which encouraged higher quality products.

2001-2012: Yamecha gyokuro won the national tea fair held by the Ministry of Agriculture, Forestry and Fisheries for being the best gyokuro produced that year. It continued to win this award for 12 consecutive years, until a gyokuro from Uji surpassed it. Yamecha gyokuro still wins this award frequently.

== See also ==
- Gyokuro
