= Baisao =

Japanese Buddhist monk

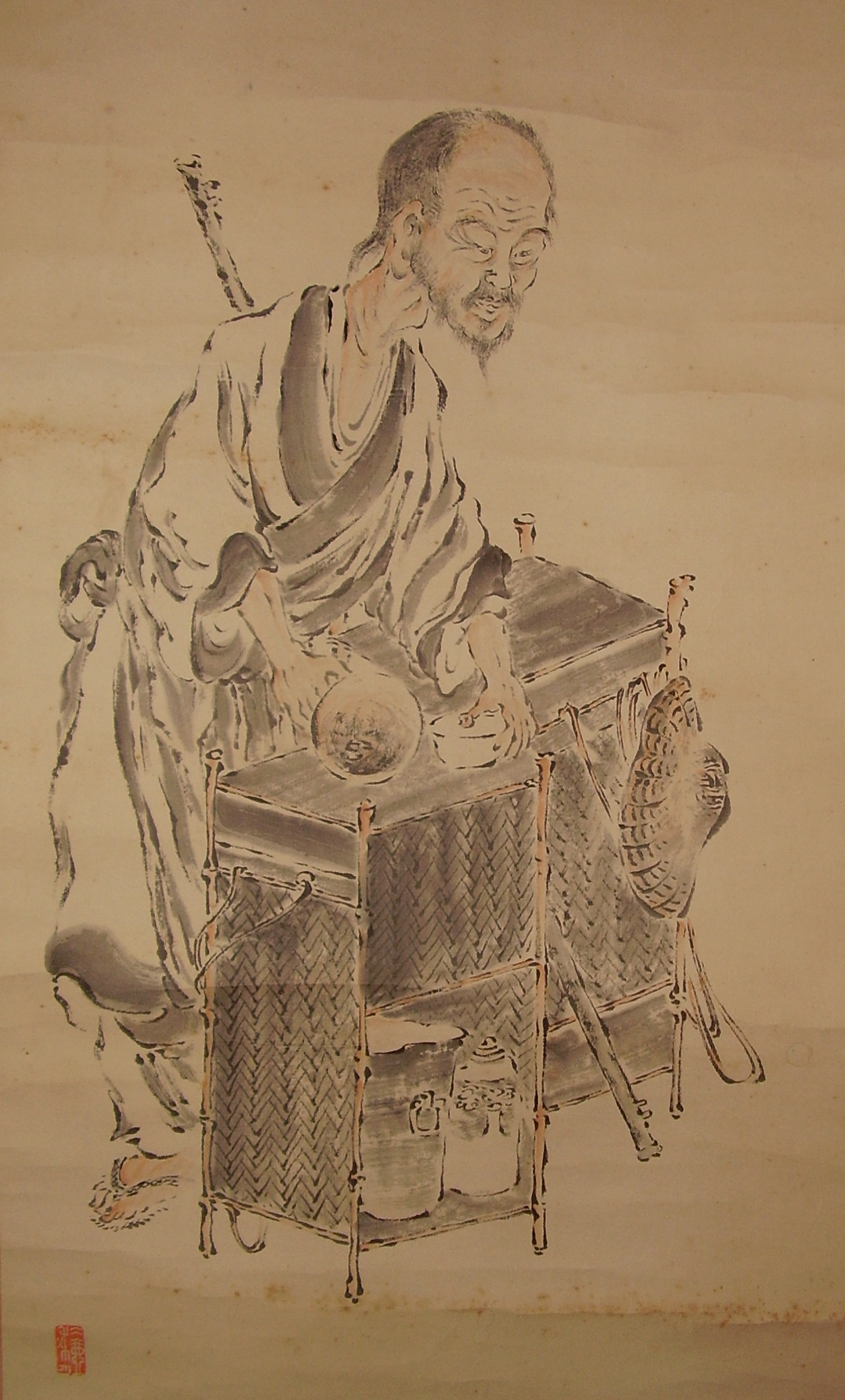
Baisao with his portable tea stand, as depicted in a gently comical caricature painting (Japanese) of the late 19th–early 20th century

Baisao (Japanese: 売茶翁, Hepburn: Baisaō) (1675–1763) was a Japanese Buddhist monk of the Ōbaku school of Zen Buddhism, who became famous for traveling around Kyoto selling tea. The veneration of Baisao during and after his lifetime helped to popularize sencha tea and led to the creation of Senchadō.

== Names ==
Baisao went by many names during his lifetime, as was common at the time. As a child, he was known as Shibayama Kikusen. When he became a monk, his Zen priest name was Gekkai Gensho. Baisao, the nickname by which he is popularly known, means "old tea seller." He acquired this name from his act of making tea in the Kyoto area. Later in his life, he denounced his priesthood and adopted the lay name of Ko Yugai.

== Early life ==
Baisao was born in the town of Hasuike in what was then Hizen Province. His father died when he was nine years old. Baisao became a Zen Buddhist monk at Ryushinji, an Ōbaku temple. His teacher, Kerin Doryo, had received instruction directly from Ingen, the founder of the Ōbaku school. Starting in 1696, Baisao travelled extensively for several years to study at various temples in Japan. Baisao then returned to his temple and served as its steward until 1723, when Daicho Genko became its abbot. His mother also died in that year. In 1724, when Baisao was 49 years old, he left the monastery and went to Kyoto, where he would live for the remainder of his life. With letters of introduction from Daicho, Baisao quickly gained the friendship of many leading artists, monks, and literati in Kyoto.

== Tea ==
Around 1735, Baisao began selling tea in the various scenic locations in Kyoto. At this time, he had not yet formally given up his priesthood. Baisao never sold his tea for a fixed price. Instead, he carried a bamboo tube with which he collected donations. He lived an ascetic life, despite his lasting friendships with illustrious individuals, and used the meagre donations from his tea peddling to keep himself nourished. As for his tea equipment, he carried it all in a woven bamboo basket he called Senka ("den of the sages") that he lugged around on a stick over his shoulder.

Baisao's method of preparing tea was referred to as sencha, or "simmered tea". In this method, whole tea leaves would be tossed into a pot of boiling water and simmered for a short period of time. This style of tea differed from matcha, the most common tea in Japan at the time, which consists of tea leaves ground into a fine powder. The method of brewing tea by grinding it into a powder and whisking it with hot water was popular in China in the Song dynasty, during which Zen Buddhist monks first brought the practice to Japan. By contrast, the Ōbaku school of Zen specialized in brewing loose leaf green tea, a style that had gradually become popular in China during the Ming dynasty. Sencha partisans of the time opposed the rigid, elaborate formalism of the traditional chanoyu tea ceremony, which uses matcha. The comparative simplicity of adding tea leaves to water appealed to many Japanese monks and intellectuals (among them Baisao and much of his social circle) who admired the carefree attitude advocated by the ancient Chinese sages. Baisao himself saw tea as a path to spiritual enlightenment, a point he made repeatedly in his poetry.

It is not known where Baisao originally obtained his tea leaves from, but by 1738, the sencha method of brewing tea had become popular enough that one of his acquaintances, a tea grower in Uji, developed new production methods to create a type of tea named after the brewing method. This sencha tea was made of whole, young leaves which were steamed and then dried. This technique differs from the typical Chinese method of producing loose leaf tea, which does not involve steaming. Baisao himself praised the tea highly, and the term sencha has come to refer primarily to the tea leaves produced by this method, not to the method of brewing them.

== Later life ==
In 1745, at the age of seventy, Baisao renounced his monasticism, changing his name to Ko Yugai. He stopped selling tea in 1755. Conscious of his own fame and hoping to avoid the creation of a ritualized sencha tradition as stifling as the formal chanoyu ceremony that he so often denounced, Baisao burned many of his own tea utensils shortly before his death. He did this in open defiance of the chanoyu tradition of venerating the utensils used by celebrated tea masters.

== Writings ==
Baisao's poetry and calligraphy are considered important in the Zen history of Japan, especially in Kyoto where Baisao was well known. His poetry was highly regarded by the artists of 18th century Kyoto, which was more "liberal" than the capital city of Edo (modern Tokyo). Over 100 of his poems have survived. Some of Baisao's writings were published in 1748 as A Collection of Tea Documents from the Plum Mountain (Baisanshu chafu ryaku). In this text, Baisao argued for the philosophical superiority of sencha over chanoyu, and wrote that priests who performed the chanoyu tea ceremony were as far from the example of the ancient sages as heaven from earth.

== Influence ==
After Baisao's death, despite the symbolic destruction of his tea utensils, a codified sencha tea ceremony based on his methods soon emerged. His friend Kimura Kenkadō published detailed descriptions and illustrations of his tea utensils. Kimura also had craftsmen make copies of some of the burned utensils. He and others promoted the veneration of Baisao and wrote detailed instructions for brewing loose leaf tea. The priest Daiten Kenjo, in his commentary for the Japanese edition of the Chinese text Secrets of Steeped Tea, described two methods of brewing loose leaf tea. One, which he called sencha, was the method used by Baisao. The other, which he called hocha, is the method generally used today, in which hot water is poured over tea leaves in a vessel. Daiten also advocated the use of tea utensils similar to those Baisao personally used. Today, Baisao is considered one of the first sencha masters. After his death, sencha continued to rise in popularity, gradually replacing matcha as the most popular type of tea in Japan.
