= Kukicha =

Japanese tea blend

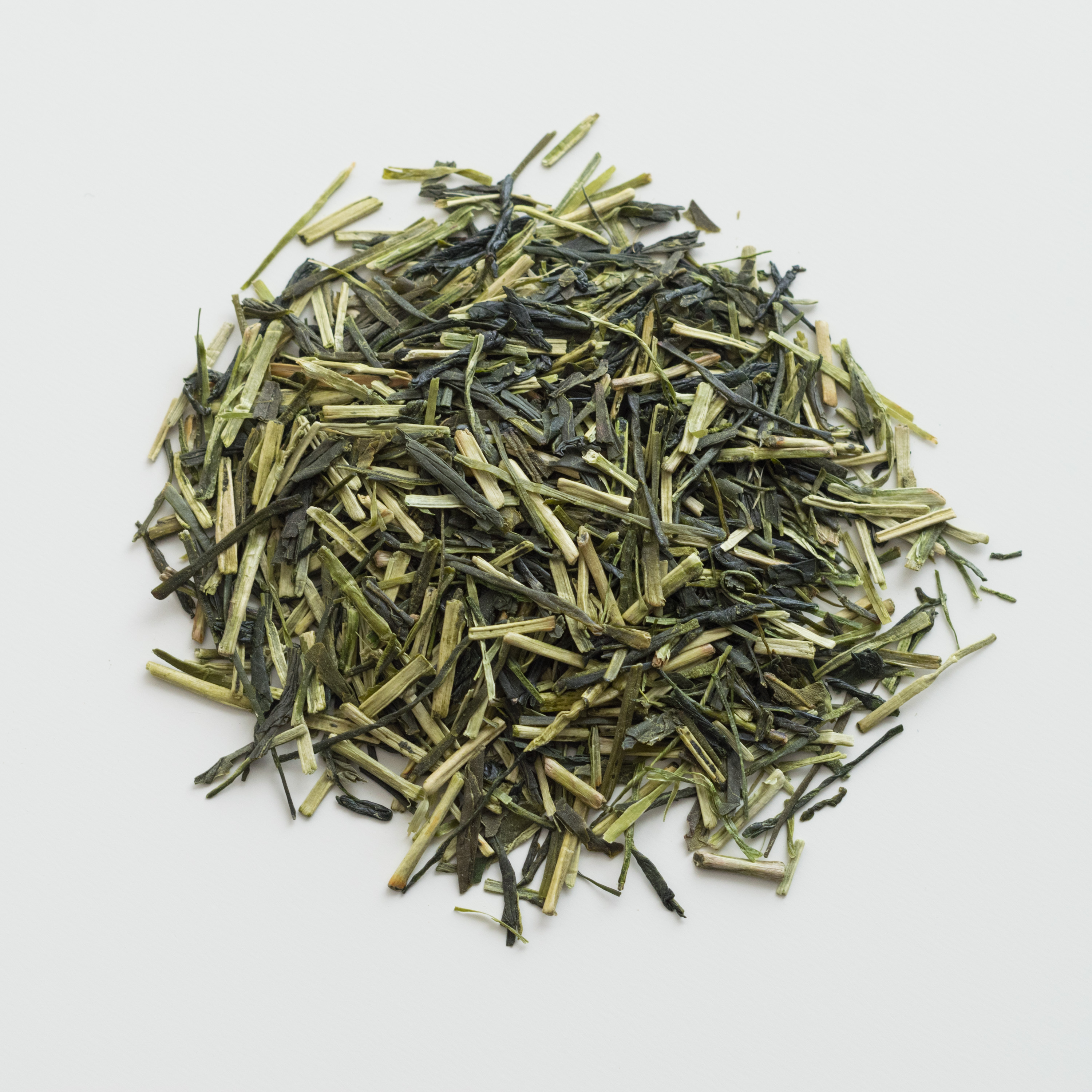
- Type: Green
- Other names: Stalk tea, stick tea, twig tea
- Origin: Japan
- Quick description: Popular in Japan, taste between that of gyokuro and sencha, with a light flavour and a fresh green aroma
- Temperature: 80 °C (176 °F)
- Time: 40 sec to 1 min

Kukicha (茎茶), or twig tea, also known as bōcha (棒茶), is a Japanese tea blend made of stems, stalks, and twigs of the tea plant. It is available as a green tea or in more oxidised processing. Kukicha has a unique flavour and aroma among teas, due to it being composed of parts of the plant that are excluded from most other teas.

Regular kukicha material comes from production of sencha or matcha. When coming from gyokuro's production, it takes the name karigane (雁ヶ音 / かりがね) or shiraore (白折 / しらおれ).

Karigane has historically been the name of kukicha made from leaves used for gyokuro green tea. However, these days the term karigane has become diverse, and is also used for any kukicha of high quality. Karigane that is specifically from Kyushu is called shiraore.

Kukicha has a mildly nutty and slightly creamy sweet flavour. It is made of four sorts of stems, stalks, and twigs of Camellia sinensis. For best results, kukicha is steeped in water between 70 and 80 °C (158 and 176 °F). Green varieties are best steeped for less than one minute. Oversteeping or steeping too hot, as with all green teas, results in a bitter, unsavoury brew.

It is common to steep kukicha for three or four infusions.

Kukicha is one of the preferred teas of the macrobiotic diet.
