= Gyokuro =

Japanese shaded green tea

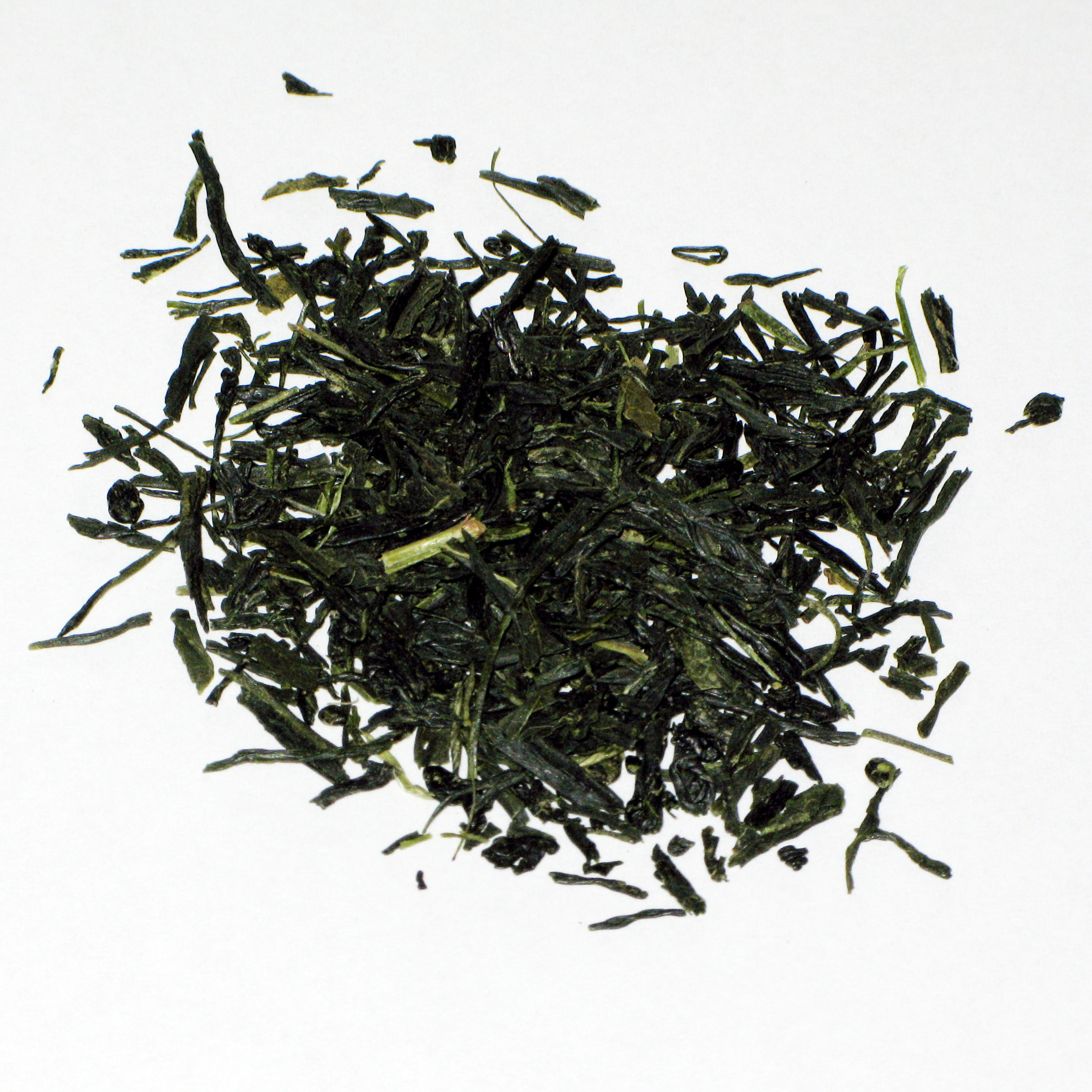
- Type: Green
- Other names: 玉露, jewel dew / jade dew / pearl dew / precious dew
- Origin: Japan

Gyokuro (Japanese: 玉露; "jade dew") is a type of green tea from Japan. It differs from the standard sencha (a classic green tea grown in the sun) in being grown under the shade rather than the full sun. The name "gyokuro" translates as "jewel dew" (or "jade dew"). According to the Japan Tea Central Association, gyokuro is defined as "a tea manufactured in the same manner as sencha from tea leaves picked from covered tea gardens that are almost completely shaded from sunlight for about 20 days using covering materials such as reed screens, straw, or shading nets, from the time when the new shoots of the first flush start to grow."

While most sencha is from the Yabukita (薮北) cultivar of Camellia sinensis, gyokuro is often made from a specialised variety such as Asahi, Okumidori, Yamakai, and Saemidori. Most gyokuro is grown in the Fukuoka, Kyoto, and Mie prefectures.

Gyokuro tea production dates back to the 1830s, when the merchant Yamamoto Kahei discovered some Japanese farmers were covering tea plants with a netting to protect them from frost, and that this actually changed the flavour and aroma of the tea. He introduced the tea to Edo and it was immediately popular.

== Cultivation and processing ==
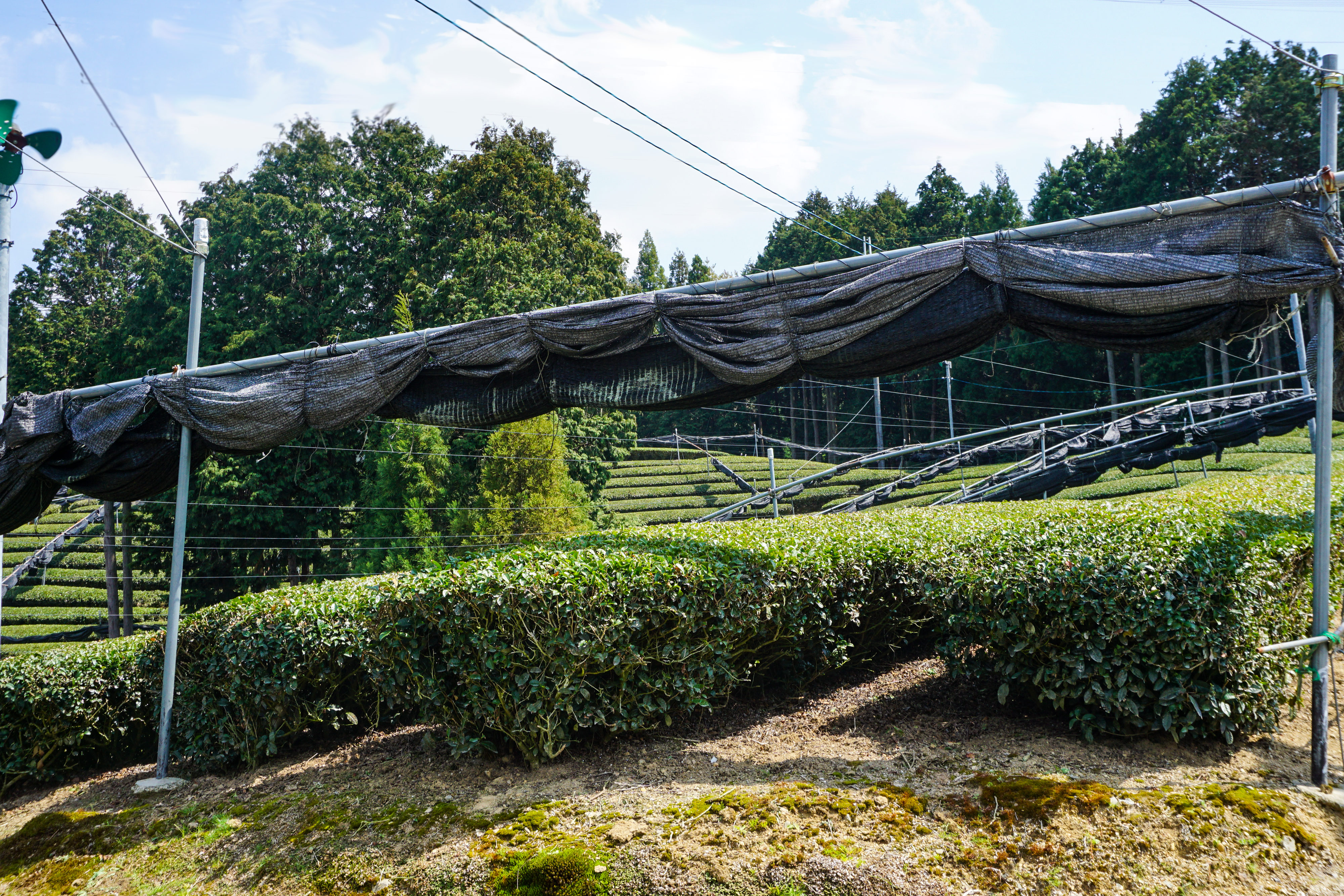
Gyokuro with a scaffold ready to be deployed for shading

Though it is categorised as a type of sencha according to production methods, gyokuro cultivation differs from other sencha teas. Gyokuro tea leaves are shielded from the sun before being harvested. The period can vary from twenty to thirty days. Three weeks / twenty days is a standard length of time for a tea to be considered gyokuro proper. Anything shaded for under twenty days is considered kabuse tea.

The shading causes both the amino acid L-theanine and the alkaloid caffeine in the tea leaves to increase, and the catechins and tannins to decrease, which yields significant differences from the flavour of sencha. The shading causes the plant to stop converting theanine into catechins to protect itself from UV light. Furthermore, the stress of shading also makes the plant produce more caffeine to protect itself. Gyokuro also has higher chlorophyll content, which accounts for the dark green colour of the leaves. These chemical differences lead to unique flavour and aroma of the tea, giving it more umami, a savory sweetness, and less bitterness and astringency. The increased L-theanine content elicits the increased umami taste of gyokuro. It also produces a calming effect which balances out the high caffeine content of gyokuro. Studies on L-theanine indicate that it may also help reduce stress and anxiety and may have neuroprotective effects.

The length and type of shading or covering (kabuse) will affect the taste of the gyokuro tea. Shading may be done with a scaffolding built over the tea field or by covering the plants directly with the shading material (jikagise). The opacity of the shading material (which can be synthetic, straw, or reed) will also affect how much theanine is contained in the leaves, which affects the flavour, particularly umami. The process is often done in stages, initially blocking 70% of the sunlight, and ramping up to 80 and 90 percent before harvesting. The higher grades of gyokuro are shaded more extensively and for longer times.

The processing of the picked gyokuro leaves will also affect the aroma and taste of the tea. Like standard sencha, gyokuro is steamed after harvesting, usually in industrial machinery. The length of the steaming can be short (asamushi), middling (chumushi), or long (fukamushi, 1–2 minutes). This will also affect the aroma and flavour of the tea. After steaming, the leaves are then dried and rolled, traditionally by hand, but now it is common to use industrial machinery to roll the leaves.

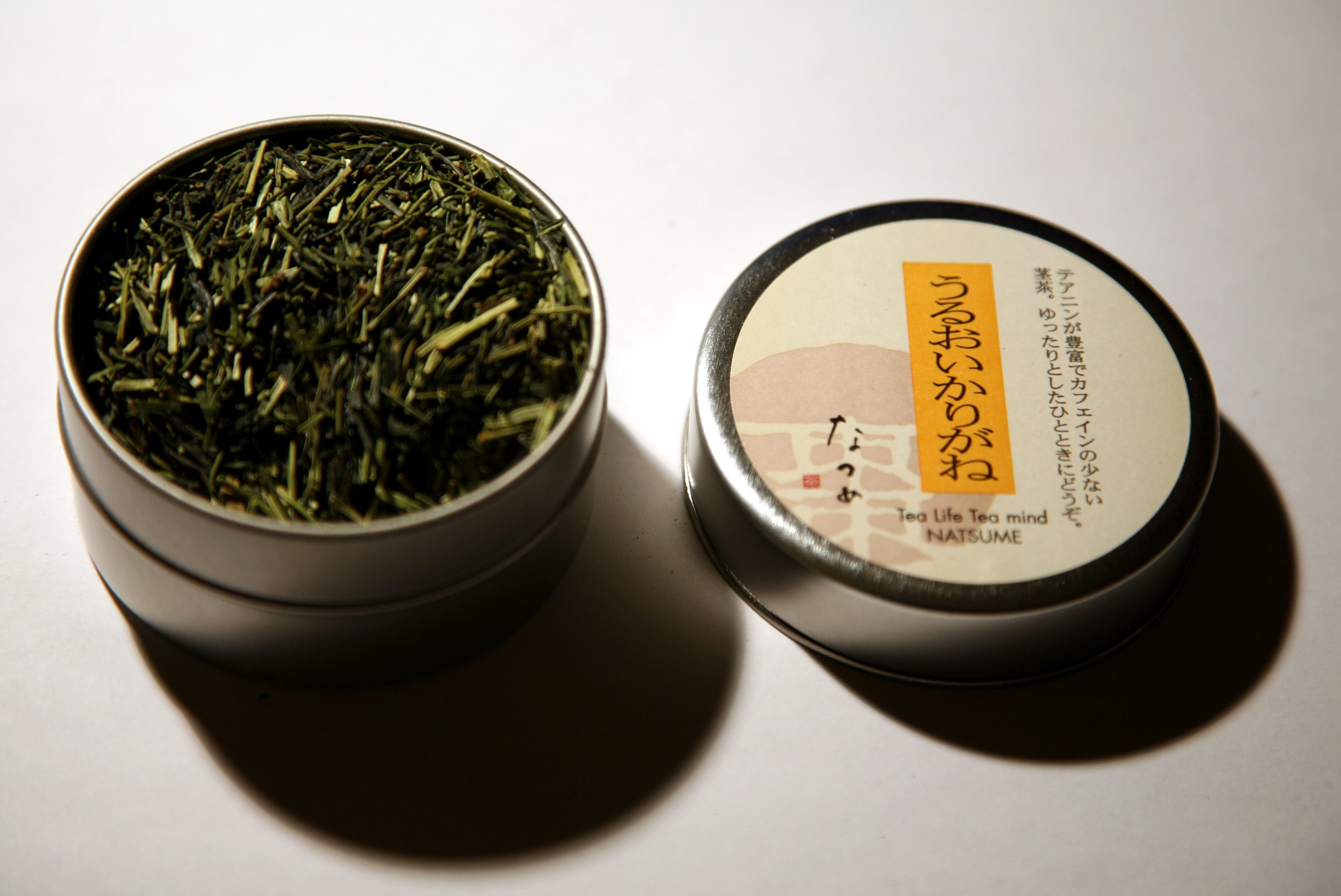
Karigane made from gyokuro, the lighter coloured stems are visible

If the leaves were harvested mechanically, the stems and other parts of the plant must be separated out from the leaves. Hand picked gyokuro exists, but it commands higher prices.

The stems, stalks, twigs and other by-products of gyokuro processing may be used to make a higher end kukicha (twig tea), which is called karigane or shiraore when processed from gyokuro stems and parts. These parts have a high concentration of theanine due to their lower photosynthetic activity compared to the leaves, have less caffeine, and also contain different aromatic and flavourful compounds, making their flavour distinct from standard gyokuro. A rough unprocessed mix of gyokuro leaves, broken particles, stalks and stems, is also sold separately as unprocessed tea / unrefined tea (aracha). These rougher types of gyokuro tend to be less expensive than standard leaf only gyokuro.

== Brewing ==
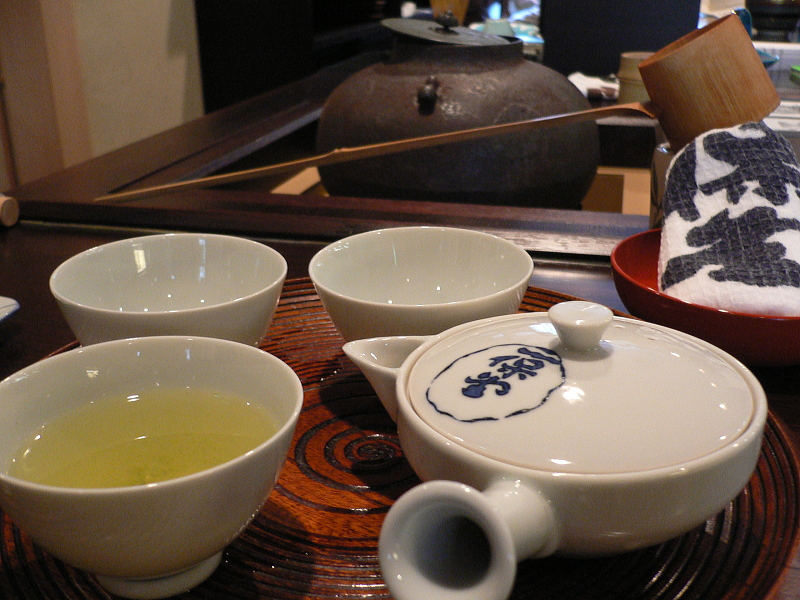
Gyokuro brewed in a traditional Kyūsu teapot

Brewing gyokuro is generally done with lower temperature water (between 40 and 70 celsius; 104 to 158 fahrenheit depending on the leaf and personal preference). The traditional Japanese method of brewing gyokuro uses a high water to leaf ratio, usually around 5 grams of leaves for 150 millilitres of water. Since the leaves are tightly rolled and need time to open, the infusion time is usually longer than other green teas (2 minutes). After the leaves have opened, the same gyokuro can then be re-infused three or four more times for 20–30 seconds.

In the practice of Senchadō (the way of sencha), many schools use a "two-step brewing" method. First, low-temperature water, cooled by initially pouring it into a separate cooling vessel, is used to extract sweetness. Then, high-temperature water is used to extract bitterness. There are also schools that add a "three-step brewing" method, which use water of intermediate temperature for the second infusion to extract astringency. However, due to the increased time required for each session and the fact that the components may be almost fully extracted by the second infusion for some tea leaves, the "two-step brewing" method is more prevalent at large tea gatherings. Small teapots such as koburi or houhin (small teapots without a handle) are often used, and the tea bowls are also smaller compared to those used for sencha.

== Regions and market ==
More than 40% of gyokuro is produced in Yame (Fukuoka Prefecture), and in the national tea jury in August 2007, Yamecha (Yame tea) held all the ranking positions from first to 26th as the best gyokuro. A high amount of Ujicha gyokuro is also produced around Uji, in the Kyoto prefecture (140 tons in 2008). In 2008, the production volume of gyokuro in Mie Prefecture increased more than 40 times compared to the previous year (132 tons in 2008, 3 tons in 2007).

Gyokuro is one of the most expensive types of sencha available in Japan. The name was originally the product name of the tea made by Yamamotoyama. The tea was first discovered by Yamamotoyama's sixth owner, Yamamoto Kahei, in 1835 (Tenpō year 6). The process was completed by another manufacturer at the start of the Meiji period.

== See also ==
- List of Japanese teas
- Theanine, a nootropic extracted from Gyokuro
- Tea Culture in Japan
