= Sencha =

Japanese green tea

Sencha 煎茶
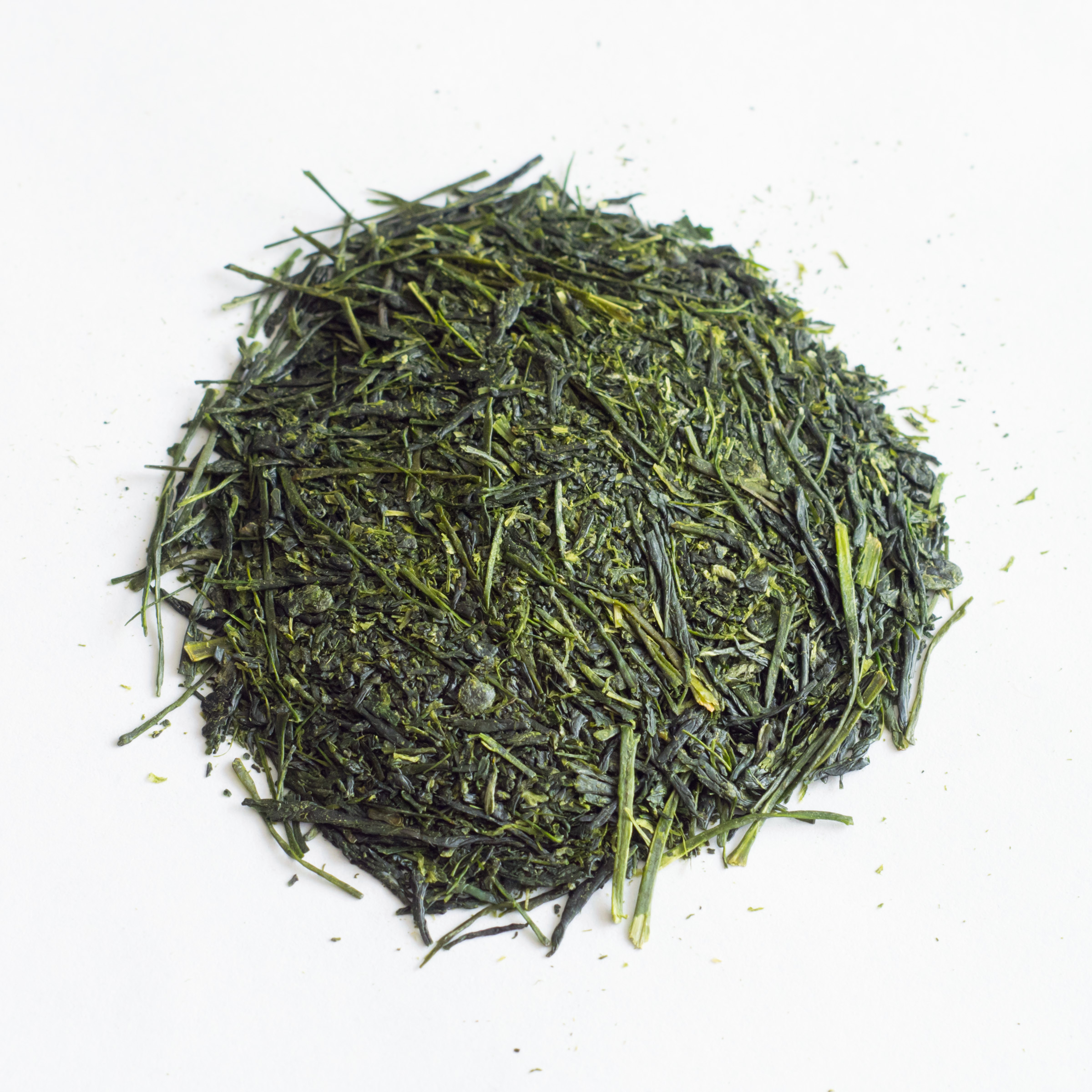
- Type: Green
- Other names: Steeped Tea, Ryokucha
- Origin: Japan
- Quick description: It is very popular in Japan. It is made from the upper leaves of the tea bush Camellia sinensis.
- Temperature: 80 °C (175 °F)
- Time: 1 min

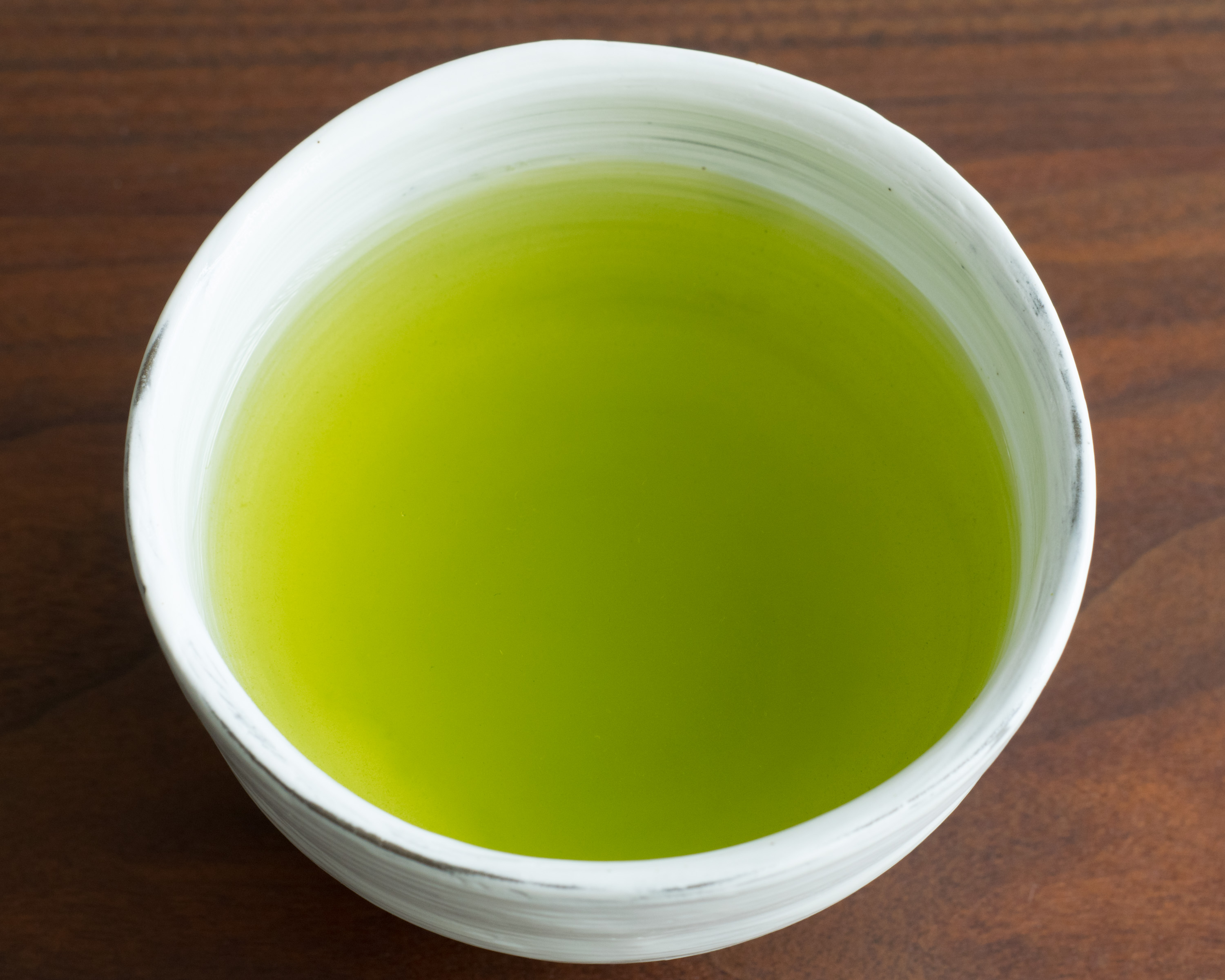
Steamed teas such as sencha produce a cloudy, richly coloured liquid.

Sencha (煎茶; lit. 'infused tea') is a type of Japanese green tea (緑茶, ryokucha) which is prepared by infusing the processed whole tea leaves in hot water. This is as opposed to matcha (抹茶), powdered Japanese green tea, where the green tea powder is mixed with hot water and therefore the leaf itself is included in the beverage. Sencha is the most popular tea in Japan.

== Overview ==
Among the various types of Japanese green tea prepared by infusion, sencha is distinguished from such specific types as gyokuro in that it is shaded for a shorter time or not at all, or bancha which is the same tea but harvested later in the season. It is the most popular tea in Japan, representing about 80 percent of the tea produced in the country.

The flavour depends upon the season and place where it is produced, but shincha, or 'new tea' from the first flush of the year, is considered the most delicious. Tea-picking in Japan begins in the south, gradually moving north with the spring warmth. During the winter, tea plants store nutrients, and the tender new leaves which sprout in the spring contain concentrated nutrients. Shincha represents these tender new leaves. The shincha season, depending upon the region of the plantation, is from early April to late May, specifically the 88th day after Setsubun which usually falls around February 4, a cross-quarter day traditionally considered the start of spring in Japan. Setsubun or Risshun is the beginning of the sexagenary cycle; therefore, by drinking sencha one can enjoy a year of good health.

The ideal colour of the sencha beverage is a greenish golden colour. Depending upon the temperature of the water in which it is infused, the flavour will be different, adding to the appeal of sencha. With relatively more temperate water, it is relatively mellow; with hot water, it is more astringent. Some varieties expand when steeped to resemble leaf vegetable greens in smell, appearance, and taste.

The tea production process by which sencha and other Japanese ryokucha are created differs from Chinese green teas, which are initially pan-fired. Japanese green tea is first steamed for between 15 and 20 seconds to prevent oxidization of the leaves. Then, the leaves are rolled, shaped, and dried. This step creates the customary thin cylindrical shape of the tea. Finally, the leaves are sorted and divided into differing quality groups.

The initial steaming step imparts a difference in the flavour between Chinese and Japanese green tea, with Japanese green tea having a more vegetal, almost grassy flavour (some taste seaweed-like). Infusions from sencha and other green teas that are steamed (like most common Japanese green teas) are also greener in colour and slightly more bitter than Chinese-style green teas.

=== Caffeine content ===
Sencha is estimated to include around 20 to 30 milligrams of caffeine per cup.

Caffeine content varies significantly based on brewing temperature, time, and tea-to-water ratio. Higher temperatures extract more caffeine.

Dry Tea Leaves:

- Superior Sencha: 31.01 mg/g of dry tea leaves
- Deep-steamed Sencha: 26.70 mg/g of dry tea leaves

Brewed Tea Leaves:

- Superior Sencha: 305.30 mg/L (brewed at 70°C for 1 min, 6g tea in 170mL water)
- Deep-steamed Sencha: 373.70 mg/L (brewed at 90°C for 1 min, 6g tea in 260mL water)

== Types ==
- Jō Sencha (上煎茶), superior sencha
- Tokujō Sencha (特上煎茶), extra superior sencha
- Hachijūhachiya Sencha (八十八夜煎茶), sencha harvested after 88 days (respectively nights) after spring begins (risshun)
- Kabuse Sencha or kabusecha (かぶせ茶), sencha which has been shaded for several days (a smaller number of days than Gyokuro)
- Asamushi (浅蒸し), lightly steamed sencha
- Chumushi (中蒸し), middle steamed (30–90 seconds)
- Fukamushi (深蒸し) or Fukamushicha , deeply steamed sencha – 1–2 minutes
- Shincha (新茶) or ichibancha (一番茶), first-picked sencha of the year
- Karigane sencha (雁が音), which is sencha that also includes stems and other parts of the tea plant along with leaves. They may include stems and parts from gyokuro and sencha, or from Sencha plants only.
- Matcha sencha - a blend of sencha with matcha powder

== Shincha ==
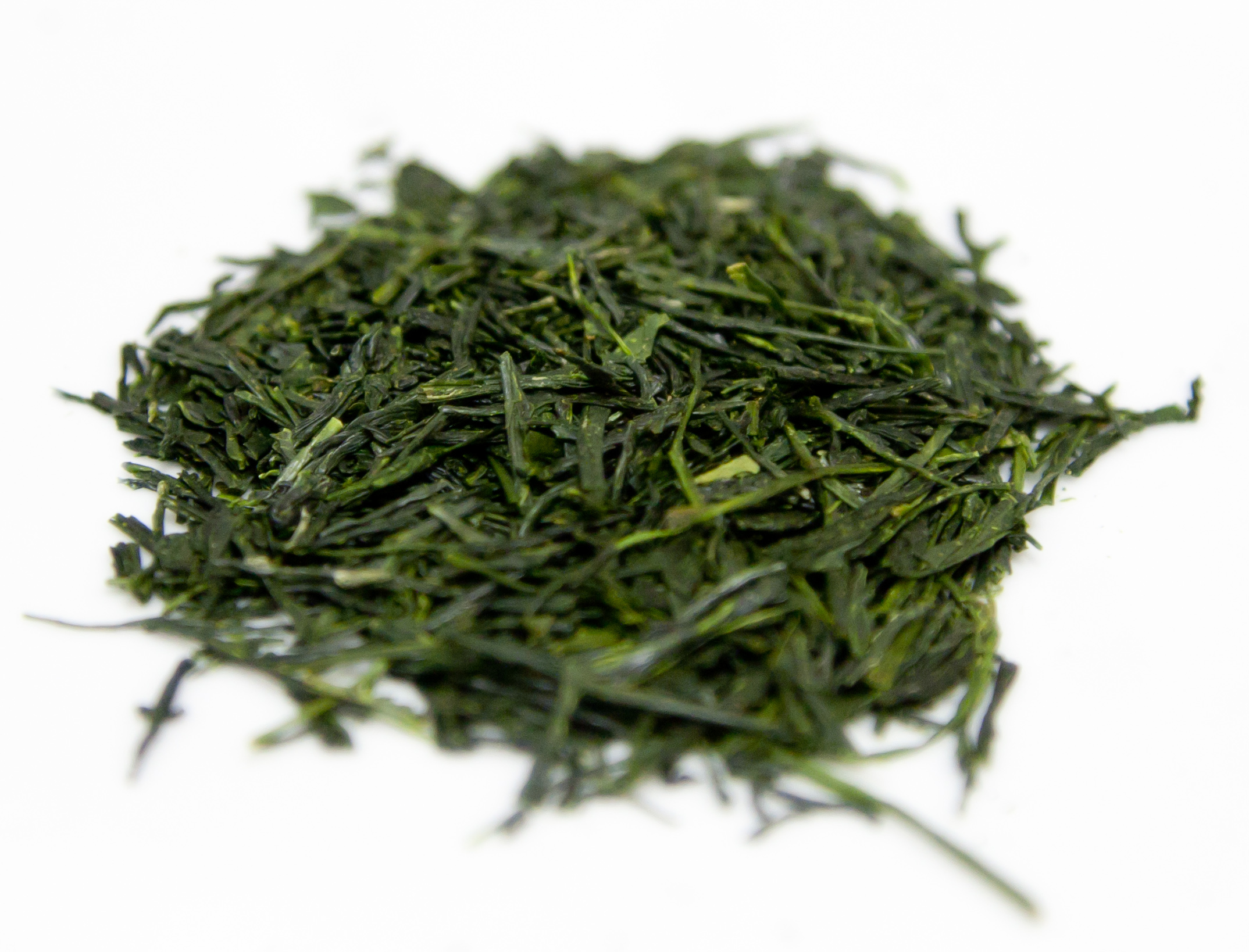
Shincha tea leaves

Shincha (新茶), 'new tea', represents the first month's harvest of sencha. It is essentially the same as ichibancha (一番茶), 'the first-picked tea', and is characterized by its fresh aroma and sweetness. Ichibancha distinguishes shincha from both nibancha ('the second-picked tea') and sanbancha ('the third-picked tea'). Use of the term shincha makes emphatically clear that the tea is the year's earliest, the first tea of the season.

== Kabusecha ==
Kabusecha (冠茶) is sencha grown in the shade to increase amino acids, such as theanine, which contribute to its distinctive flavor. About a week before the tea leaf buds are picked in the spring, the plantation is covered with a screen to cut out the direct sunlight. This shading produces a milder tea than standard sencha. The shaded tea known as gyokuro differs from kabusecha in that it is shaded for a longer period: about 20 days.

Special nets (kabuse) are hung over the plants to obtain a natural shade without completely blocking out sunlight. Kabusecha sencha has a mellower flavour and more subtle colour than sencha grown in direct sunlight.

== Senchadō ==
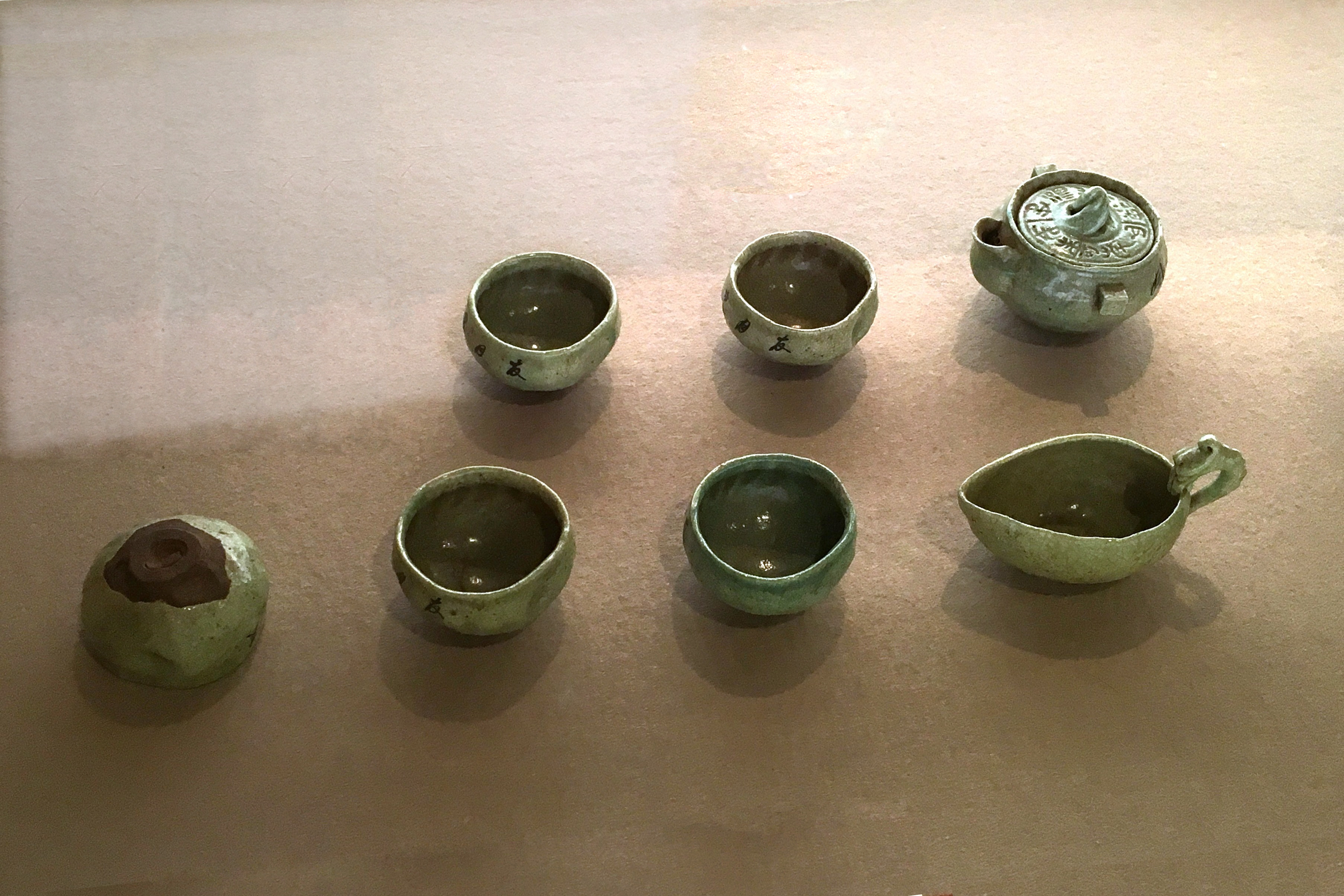
A set for sencha utensils, Sasashima ware by Maki Bokusai, Edo period, 18th–19th century

Senchadō (煎茶道 'Way of Sencha') is the formal art of enjoying sencha. Generally it involves the high-grade gyokuro class.

== See also ==
- Baisao—regarded as the first sencha master
- Japanese tea
- Tea culture in Japan
