= Powdered tea =

Tea made or prepared from processed tea leaves reduced to powder

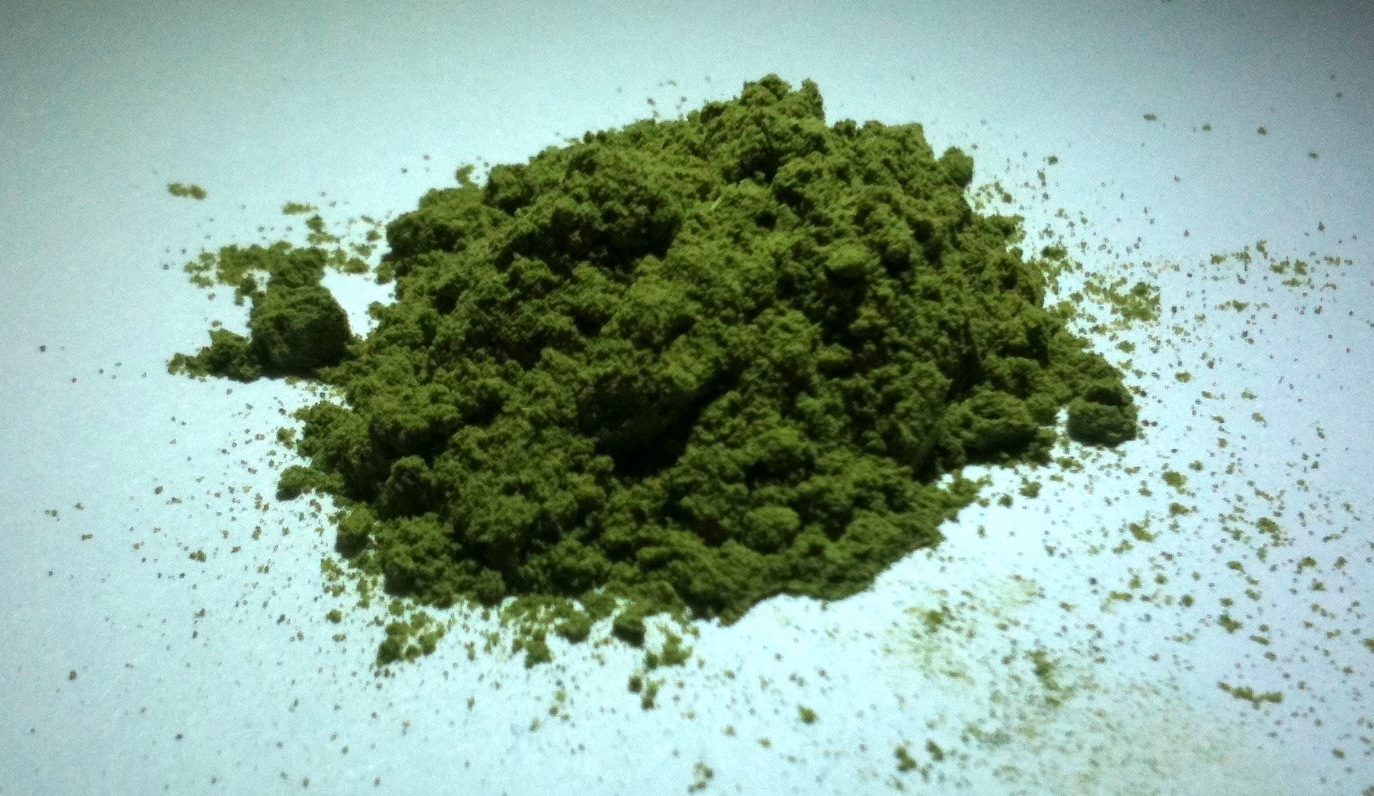
A mound of Japanese powdered green tea (funmatsucha)

Powdered tea is tea made or prepared from processed tea leaves that have been reduced to powder. It includes teas manufactured and sold as powders, such as matcha and powdered green tea made from sencha or other green teas, as well as historical preparations in which compressed tea was ground shortly before drinking.

In Tang-dynasty China, compressed cake tea was ground and boiled in water. During the Song dynasty, finely ground tea was mixed with hot water in a bowl using the method known as dian cha. Historical Chinese powdered teas have also been examined in relation to the manufacturing origins of Japanese matcha, while compressed tea ground before preparation has been distinguished from tea manufactured in powdered form.

In the modern Japanese tea industry, funmatsucha (粉末茶, lit. "powdered tea") has a narrower meaning. The labeling standards of the Japan Tea Central Association define it as tea reduced to powder using a mill or similar equipment and classify it separately from matcha, konacha, and instant tea.

== Terminology and scope ==
Modern products such as matcha and powdered green tea are manufactured and sold in powdered form. In some historical methods of tea preparation, by contrast, compressed tea was ground shortly before it was consumed.

A study of powdered teas sold in Japan described matcha as a type of powdered tea and compared three groups: matcha intended for the Japanese tea ceremony, matcha sold for cooking or food manufacturing, and powdered green tea not labeled as matcha. In that study, the powdered green tea samples were made from sencha, gyokuro, or other green teas rather than tencha.

In the standards of the Japan Tea Central Association, funmatsucha is a specific category distinct from matcha, konacha, and instant tea. Matcha is defined as finely ground tencha, whereas funmatsucha is defined as tea reduced to powder using a mill or similar equipment.

Historical Chinese sources contain the term 末茶, literally "powdered tea". The Classic of Tea lists it separately from coarse tea, loose tea, and cake tea. The work does not describe its production in detail, however, and scholars have differed over the precise form denoted by the term.

== Historical preparations ==
=== Tang dynasty ===
In Tang-dynasty China, solid cakes of compressed tea were ground before they were consumed.

The cake tea described by Lu Yu in The Classic of Tea was made by steaming freshly harvested tea leaves, pounding them in a mortar, pressing them into molds, piercing the resulting cakes, and drying them over a brazier.

Before preparation, a cake was roasted over a fire and allowed to cool. It was then ground with a nian (碾), a roller-shaped grinding implement, and passed through a sieve. The resulting powder was placed in a cauldron of boiling water, and the prepared tea was distributed among bowls.

The ground cake tea used in this procedure was not necessarily identical to the category called 末茶 in The Classic of Tea. The work lists cake tea and 末茶 separately but gives no detailed manufacturing method for the latter.

=== Song dynasty ===
During the Song dynasty, tea was produced both as compressed tea, known as piancha (片茶), and as loose-leaf tea, known as sancha (散茶). Compressed forms included round cakes called tuancha (團茶). Tea produced at Beiyuan in Fujian was particularly renowned as a high-grade tribute tea.

Before preparation, compressed tea was broken into pieces, ground using a roller mill or millstone, and passed through a sieve to produce a fine powder. In the method called dian cha, the powder was placed in a tea bowl, hot water was added, and the mixture was stirred or agitated with a utensil until frothy.

Song administrative records and sources concerning tea regulations also contain names such as 末茶 and 末散茶. The exact products denoted by these names and their relationship to compressed and loose-leaf tea remain uncertain.

The development of dian cha did not completely replace other preparation methods. Loose-leaf tea continued to be boiled or infused, and different methods of drinking tea coexisted during the Song dynasty.

From the late Song dynasty through the Ming dynasty, infusing loose leaves in hot water became increasingly widespread in China. As this practice became predominant, the preparation of ground compressed tea by methods such as dian cha declined.

=== Japan ===
The Kissa Yōjōki, written by Eisai at the beginning of the Kamakura period, describes what it calls the "Song-dynasty method of roasting tea". According to the work, tea leaves were steamed immediately after harvesting, dried on a roasting rack, and stored.

Unlike the manufacture of Tang- and Song-dynasty cake tea, the method described in the work does not include pounding the steamed leaves, pressing them into molds, or forming them into solid cakes.

The work also states that mulberry leaves should be "made into powder according to the method used for tea". This passage has been interpreted as indicating that the tea described in the work was also used in powdered form. The text does not, however, describe a specific grinding implement or procedure, nor does it explain the use of a tea whisk.

A study of the manufacturing origins of matcha distinguished cake tea ground shortly before preparation from 末茶 as a separately manufactured form. It examined references to 末茶 in Chinese sources as possible antecedents of Japanese matcha rather than treating every historical use of ground tea as the same product.

== Modern powdered teas ==
=== Matcha ===
Matcha is a powdered tea made from tencha. Under Japanese labeling standards, tencha is made from tea leaves grown under cover before harvesting, steamed, and dried without being rolled. The tencha is then ground into a fine powder using a stone mill or equipment with a similar function.

Its source material and production process distinguish matcha from powdered green tea made by grinding finished sencha or other non-tencha teas.

A study comparing the chemical components of matcha and powdered green tea found that matcha intended for the tea ceremony tended to contain more theanine and chlorophyll than powdered green tea. The industrial-grade matcha and powdered green tea samples examined in the study could not, however, be clearly distinguished using only the measured chemical components.

=== Powdered green tea ===
In modern Japan, powdered green tea is generally produced by grinding finished green tea such as sencha. The Ministry of Agriculture, Forestry and Fisheries describes Japanese powdered tea as sencha finely ground using machinery.

In research on products sold in Japan, the category "powdered green tea" included powders made from sencha and gyokuro, as well as a product whose underlying tea type was not identified. It was distinguished from matcha according to whether the source tea was tencha.

Powdered green tea is mixed with hot or cold water and consumed with the ground leaf material. It is also used as an ingredient in cakes, noodles, ice cream, and other processed foods.

The formal definition of funmatsucha includes tea reduced to powder using a mill or similar equipment. Matcha remains a separately defined category because it is made specifically from tencha.

== Related products ==
=== Konacha ===
Konacha (粉茶, lit. "powder tea") consists of small particles and cut leaves separated by sieving during the finishing of sencha, gyokuro, and related teas. It is produced as part of the tea-finishing process rather than by intentionally grinding finished tea.

Konacha is classified separately from both matcha and funmatsucha under Japanese labeling standards.

=== Instant tea ===
Instant tea is produced by extracting water-soluble solid components from green tea, concentrating the extract, and drying it into a powder or granules.

It differs from powdered tea made from ground leaves because it consists primarily of dried tea extract rather than the complete ground leaf material.

== See also ==
- Tea
- Green tea
- Compressed tea
- History of tea
- Dian cha
- Matcha
- Tencha
- Konacha
- Instant tea

== Sources ==
- Nunome, Chōfū (1982). 抹茶の源流 [The origins of matcha]. Kaitoku (in Japanese). 51: 21–27.
- Mizuno, Masaaki (1983). 宋代における茶の生産について [Tea production during the Song dynasty]. Machikaneyama Ronsō: History (in Japanese). 17: 25–51.
- Takahashi, Tadahiko (March 1989). 唐宋を中心とした飲茶法の變遷について [On the methods of tea-drinking in the Tang–Song period]. Memoirs of the Institute for Advanced Studies on Asia (in Japanese). 109. Institute for Advanced Studies on Asia, University of Tokyo: 243–272. doi:10.15083/00027187.
- Horie, Hideki; Ema, Kaori; Sumikawa, Osamu (2017). "Chemical Components of Matcha and Powdered Green Tea". Journal of Cookery Science of Japan (in Japanese). 50 (5): 182–188. doi:10.11402/cookeryscience.50.182.
- Mizuno, Aki; Hiraki, Kōhei (March 2018). 栄西『喫茶養生記』全訳注――「茶」の飲用と仙木「桑」の活用による養生法 [Eisai's Kissa Yōjōki: Annotated translation] (PDF). Jinbungaku Ronshū (in Japanese). 36. Society of Humanities, Osaka Prefecture University: 23–73. doi:10.24729/00004286.
