= Shade cultivation of tea =

Japanese method of cultivating tea plants under shade

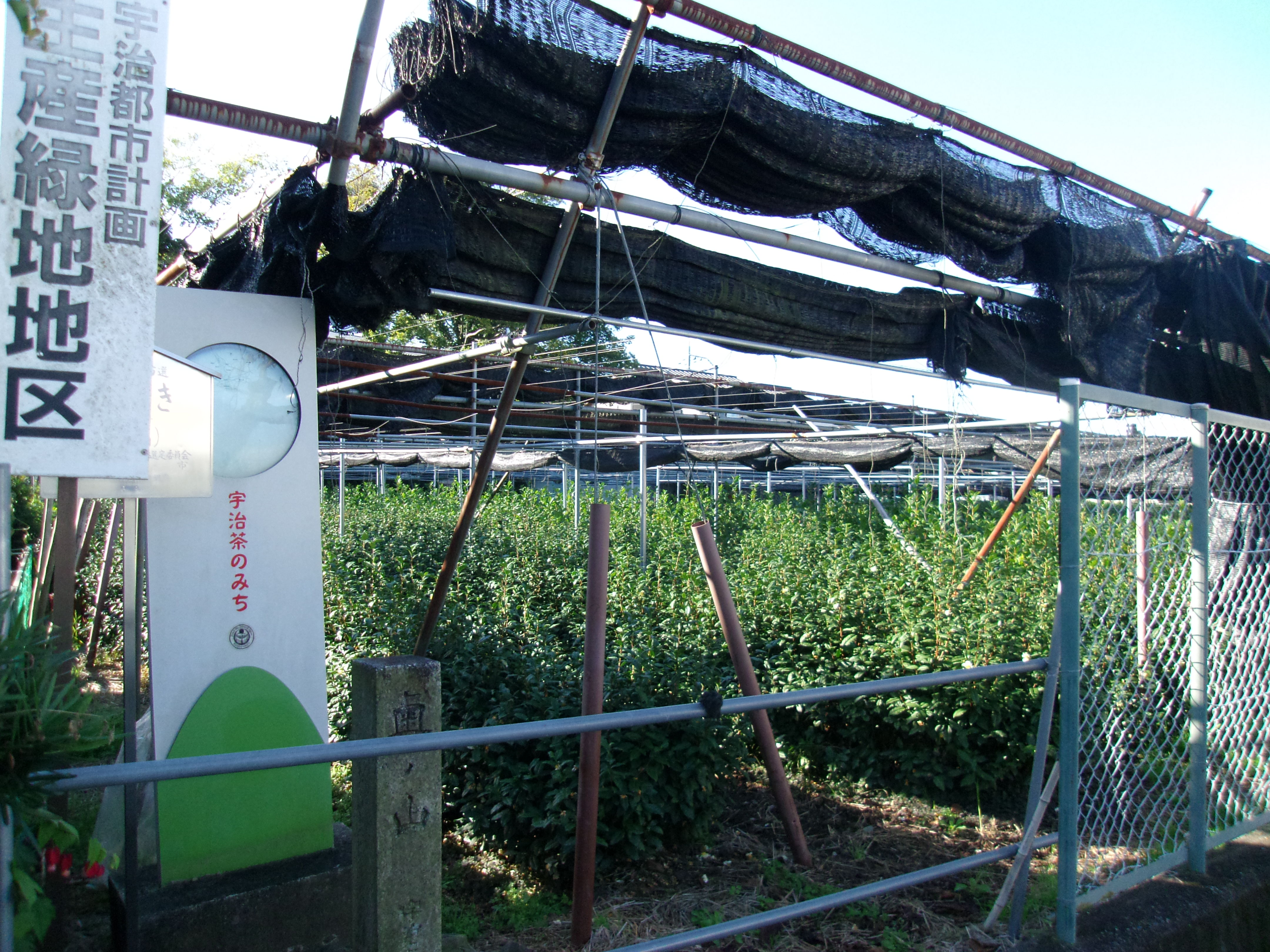
A covered tea garden at Okunoyama in Uji, Kyoto

Shade cultivation of tea (Japanese: 覆下栽培, romanized: ōishita saibai), also called covered cultivation, is a Japanese method of tea cultivation in which tea bushes are covered before harvest to reduce their exposure to sunlight. The plants are generally shaded for approximately one to four weeks, depending on the type of tea and the intended quality. The two principal methods are overhead canopy shading, in which covering materials are suspended above the plants, and direct covering, in which shading fabric is laid on the surface of the tea bushes.

Shading alters the growth and chemical composition of the new shoots. It suppresses the decrease in free amino acids and the accumulation of catechins that normally occur as the shoots develop, producing tea with stronger umami and less astringency. It also increases the leaves' chlorophyll content, giving them a deeper green colour, and produces a characteristic aroma known as 覆い香 (ōika, "covering aroma"). The technique is used primarily to produce leaves for gyokuro, kabusecha, and tencha, the raw material from which matcha is made.

Shade cultivation developed in the Uji tea-producing region. The Jesuit missionary João Rodrigues described covered tea gardens in late-16th-century Uji in his 17th-century História da Igreja do Japão. A 2019 soil study of the Okunoyama tea garden in Uji concluded that shade cultivation at that garden had probably begun by the first half of the 15th century.

== History ==
=== Origins ===
Before the publication of the 2019 soil study, the origins of shade cultivation had generally been inferred from historical records describing covered tea gardens in the second half of the 16th century, although the precise date at which the practice began remained uncertain.

One of the principal written accounts is the História da Igreja do Japão by the Jesuit missionary João Rodrigues. Rodrigues described tea gardens in Uji where frames were erected over the plants and enclosed with mats made from reeds or straw. According to his account, the coverings were used to protect the soft and delicate new shoots from frost damage.

In 2019, researchers examined the soil profile of the Okunoyama tea garden in Uji. They analysed soil carbon content, rice-derived phytoliths, and radiocarbon dates. An increase in rice-derived phytoliths and carbon in a soil layer dated to between 1396 and 1440 was interpreted by the researchers as evidence that large quantities of rice straw had been applied to the garden. They therefore estimated that shade cultivation at Okunoyama had begun by the first half of the 15th century, approximately 150 years earlier than had previously been inferred from historical documents.

Covering appears initially to have been intended principally to protect new shoots from frost. Growers subsequently recognised that leaves grown under cover differed from open-grown leaves in colour, flavour, and aroma. The practice consequently developed from a protective measure into a means of controlling and improving tea quality.

The development of shade cultivation contributed to the characteristic deep-green colour, umami taste, and aroma of later Japanese tencha and matcha.

=== Spread from Uji ===
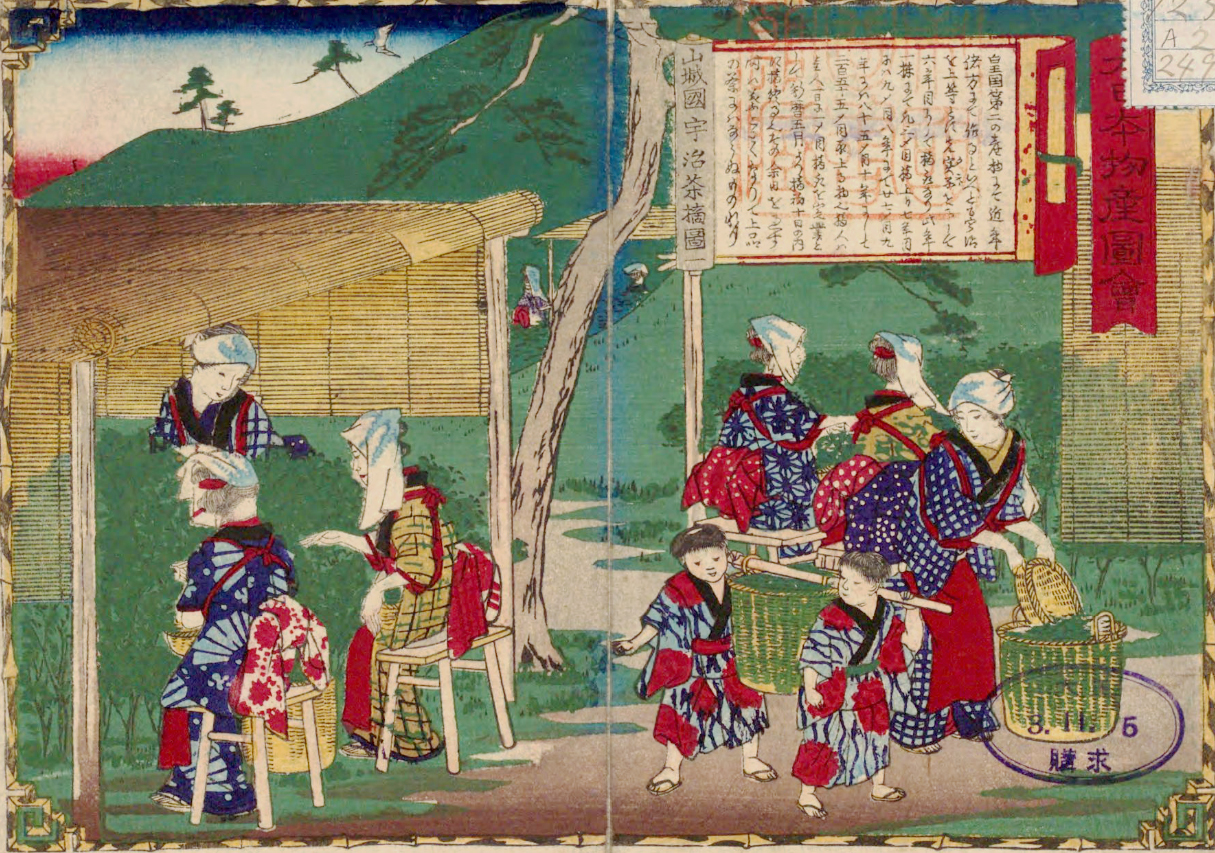
Tea Picking in Uji, Yamashiro Province, from the Products of Greater Japan series by Hiroshige III, 1877

From the late medieval period into the Edo period, the use of shade cultivation was restricted to certain authorised tea producers in Uji. Their economic position later deteriorated under measures including tea-price controls imposed by the Tokugawa shogunate.

A major fire in Uji in 1698 destroyed covered tea gardens, tea-processing facilities, and residences. Because it became difficult to maintain the supply of tencha, tea producers in surrounding districts were subsequently permitted to employ shade cultivation. The technique therefore spread beyond Uji, while the exclusive position of the Uji tea masters weakened.

In 1738, the tea grower Nagatani Sōen is traditionally credited with developing the aosei sencha seihō, the steaming and hand-rolling method that became the basis of modern sencha manufacture. In the 1830s, gyokuro is said to have emerged through the application of sencha-style processing to leaves grown in covered gardens. During its early development, leaves from the same covered garden could be processed either as tencha or as gyokuro. The mechanisation of tea processing in the early 20th century contributed to increasing specialisation of tea gardens and factories by tea type.

From the mid-1980s, matcha began to be used more widely as a food ingredient. During the following decades, demand for matcha used in ice cream, confectionery, beverages, and other processed foods increased. Production of comparatively inexpensive processing-grade tencha and kabusecha consequently expanded, and direct covering became the principal shading method used for this sector because of its lower cost. By the 2025 crop year, Japanese tencha production was approximately 3.2 times its 2014 level.

== Methods ==
The covering material, shading rate, date on which covering begins, and duration of covering vary according to the intended tea type, cultivar, harvest season, local climate, and desired quality.

Traditional gyokuro and high-grade tencha are generally shaded with material having a high shading rate for approximately 20 to 30 days. Kabusecha is commonly shaded for approximately 7 to 15 days, while brief covering of about one week may be used principally to improve leaf colour.

=== Covering materials ===
The traditional covering materials are reed screens called 葭簀 (yoshizu) and rice straw. A method using these natural materials is known as 本ず (honzu) covering or honzu cultivation.

A traditional rule is expressed as "ten days under reed screens and ten days under straw". The garden is first shaded for approximately ten days with reed screens. Straw is then spread over the screens for a further ten days, raising the final shading rate to approximately 98 per cent. Woven straw or rush mats may also be used.

Traditional honzu cultivation has declined because suitable reeds and straw are difficult to obtain and because spreading the straw evenly over the canopy requires skilled labour. Since the late 1970s and early 1980s, black synthetic materials containing carbon have become widely used. Modern covering materials are commonly made from polyethylene or polypropylene shade netting; Vinylon was also formerly used.

=== Overhead canopy shading ===
Overhead canopy shading uses a permanent or temporary frame erected above the tea bushes. The top and, when necessary, the sides of the structure are covered with reed screens, straw, woven mats, or synthetic shading fabric. It is widely used for gyokuro and tencha and is sometimes employed for high-grade kabusecha.

Modern frames may be constructed from steel pipes or from steel posts supporting resin-coated wires. Synthetic covering materials may be applied in one or more layers, allowing the shading rate to be increased in stages. Traditional honzu cultivation is conducted using an overhead canopy.

Overhead systems are suited to the production of high-grade gyokuro and tencha, but the construction and maintenance of the supporting frames involve substantial expense.

=== Direct covering ===
In direct covering, shading fabric is laid directly on the surface of the tea bushes. Because a supporting canopy is not required, the method is used where lower-cost production is required. It is widely employed for kabusecha and for tencha intended for processing-grade matcha.

The effects of direct covering vary according to the material, shading rate, date at which covering begins, and duration of covering. For direct-covered tencha, black shade netting with a shading rate of about 85 per cent may be applied for at least 20 days during the first flush. Kabusecha is generally covered with similar material for approximately 7 to 15 days.

The material should cover the sides and ends of the tea hedges securely. If harvesting is delayed under direct covering, the new shoots and lower leaves may harden, causing whitish undersides, blackening, and other reductions in leaf quality.

== Effects ==
Shade cultivation affects shoot growth, yield, leaf morphology, chemical composition, colour, taste, and aroma. Stronger or longer shading generally makes the characteristics of covered tea more pronounced, but it can also reduce photosynthesis and shoot growth and place stress on the plants.

=== Growth and yield ===
Because shading restricts the light available for photosynthesis, carbohydrate production and the accumulation of dry matter in the new shoots are reduced. Leaf expansion is altered, and shaded leaves generally become thinner than leaves grown in full sunlight.

A Japanese field experiment using different levels of direct-cover shading found that shoot growth declined as the shading rate increased.

Longer covering periods may delay the first and second flushes, shifting the growth of later shoots into periods of summer drought or high temperature. Delayed autumn growth can prevent the formation of a sufficiently developed canopy and reduce the number or uniformity of shoots in the following year's first flush. The severity of these effects depends on factors including the shading rate, duration and continuity of covering, start date, and harvested yield.

The effects are not determined by shading rate alone. In one trial, almost complete shading for approximately two weeks caused temporary death and shedding of mature leaves, but did not reduce the yield of the following year's first flush. Longer or continuous covering had a greater effect on later growth and subsequent yield.

Covered-tea production also requires more labour than open-field sencha production, particularly for installing, securing, removing, and handling the covering materials.

=== Taste and chemical composition ===
As open-grown tea shoots develop, their free amino-acid content generally declines while catechins accumulate. Shading suppresses both the decline in amino acids and the increase in catechins. Covered leaves consequently tend to contain more amino acids associated with umami and fewer catechins associated with astringency than comparable open-grown leaves.

In 1950, the Japanese chemist Yajirō Sakato isolated a previously unknown amide from gyokuro and named it theanine, after the former scientific name of tea, Thea sinensis. Theanine is one of the principal free amino acids in tea and is an important component of its umami taste.

Studies carried out in China have examined the physiological mechanisms underlying these changes. An experiment with the cultivar Shuchazao found that shading promoted theanine biosynthesis in the roots and altered its allocation among the roots, stems, and shoots. A separate study using the cultivars Xiangfeicui and Jinxuan found that shading altered carbon and nitrogen metabolism in the roots and leaves and changed the expression of genes involved in flavonoid biosynthesis.

In a Japanese field experiment in which first-flush shoots were directly covered for 20 days, shoots grown under shading rates of 75 and 90 per cent contained more theanine than unshaded shoots at the end of the treatment. The concentration of epigallocatechin decreased as shading became stronger. Individual amino acids, however, did not all respond to shading in the same manner or at the same stage of shoot development.

A study of gyokuro found that, after the covering materials were removed, longer exposure of the shoots to sunlight reduced the total free-amino-acid and theanine contents of the manufactured tea and increased its catechin content. Sensory quality also declined as the duration of exposure increased.

=== Aroma ===
Covered tea has a characteristic aroma called 覆い香 (ōika), commonly described as resembling nori or other green seaweed. One of its principal components is dimethyl sulfide (DMS).

DMS is formed during tea processing from the precursor S-methylmethionine sulfonium salt (MMSC). Shading increases the amount of MMSC in the leaves and consequently increases the potential formation of DMS. In sensory evaluation of gyokuro, DMS concentration has been reported to correlate positively with aroma scores.

Exposure of gyokuro shoots to sunlight after the removal of the covering materials reduces the DMS concentration of the processed tea.

Shading also increases the concentration of carotenoids. During processing, carotenoids can form ionone-related aroma compounds associated with sweet, violet-like notes. Other compounds associated with the aroma of shaded tea include 3-methylbutanal, pentanal, and 2-methylpropanal.

=== Colour and leaf morphology ===
Under reduced light, tea leaves generally accumulate more chlorophyll, improving their capacity to absorb the available light. Shaded leaves therefore develop a deeper green colour than comparable open-grown leaves.

Shading also changes leaf morphology. The leaves tend to become thinner, while dry mass per unit leaf area declines.

A deep and uniform green colour is particularly important in the quality assessment of tencha intended for matcha. Gyokuro and kabusecha are also evaluated partly by the development of the green leaf colour associated with sufficient shading.

== Production regions ==
In the 2025 crop year, Kagoshima, Kyoto, and Shizuoka ranked first, second, and third respectively in tencha production. Mie, Kyoto, and Fukuoka ranked first, second, and third in gyokuro production. Mie ranked first and Shizuoka third in kabusecha production. The Ministry of Agriculture, Forestry and Fisheries also identifies Nara and Fukuoka among the principal kabusecha-producing prefectures.

=== Kyoto Prefecture ===
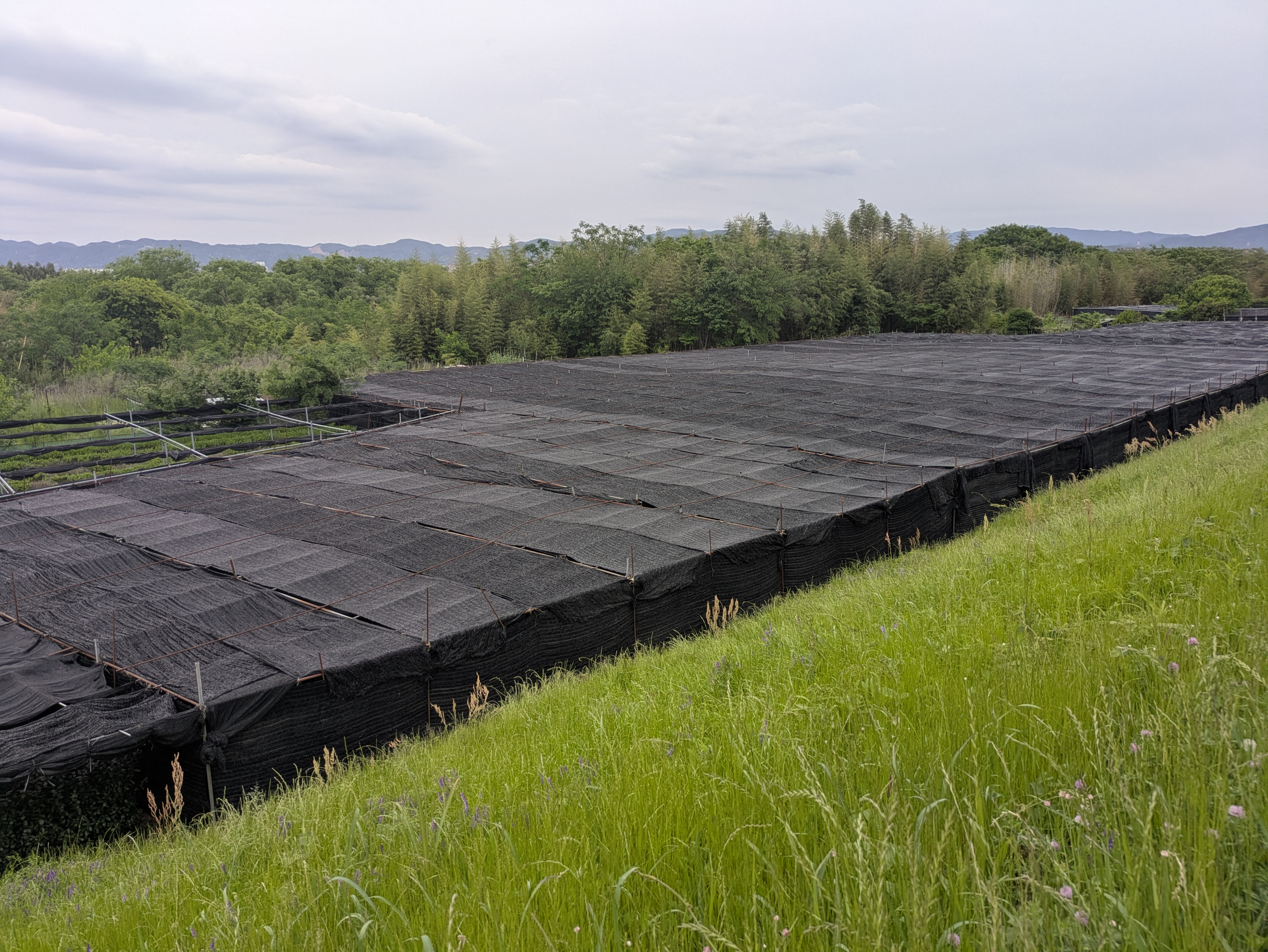
A covered tea garden at Kōzuya in Yawata, Kyoto

Kyoto Prefecture is the historical centre of shade cultivation and remains a major producer of gyokuro and tencha. Both synthetic overhead coverings and traditional honzu cultivation using reed screens and rice straw are practised.

The prefectural government supports the replacement of older bushes with cultivars developed or traditionally used for Uji tea, as well as the construction and renewal of shading frames. Cultivars classified by the prefecture as Uji cultivars include Uji Midori, Kyō Midori, Samidori, Asahi, Uji Hikari, Ogura Midori, Gokō, Komakage, Hōshun, and Tenmyō.

=== Mie Prefecture ===
Mie Prefecture is particularly associated with kabusecha, whose production is concentrated in the northern part of the prefecture.

Commercial kabusecha production in northern Mie is reported to have begun in 1951. Overhead covering was initially common, but direct covering spread because it was simpler and less expensive. The relatively cool climate of northern Mie resulted in a later harvesting season and lower market prices for ordinary sencha; producing kabusecha added value to the crop.

Mie also produces sencha, deep-steamed tea, tencha, and gyokuro.

=== Fukuoka Prefecture ===
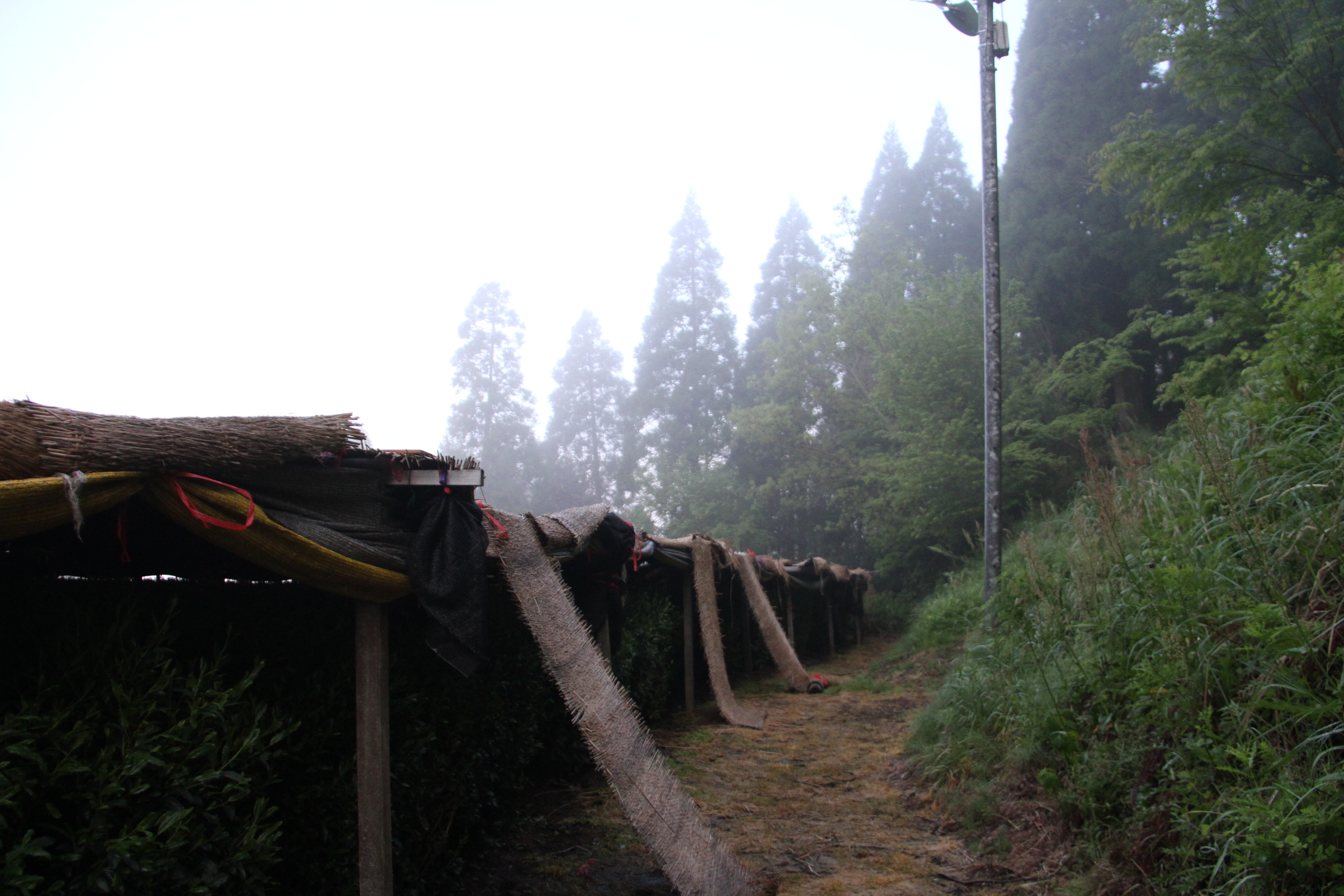
A tea garden producing Traditional Authentic Yame Gyokuro in Yame, Fukuoka

The area around Yame in Fukuoka Prefecture is a major gyokuro-producing region. In 2015, tea produced under a specified traditional system was registered under Japan's geographical-indication system as Traditional Authentic Yame Gyokuro.

The bushes are grown in a natural form rather than being regularly trimmed into an arched surface for mechanical harvesting. A canopy is erected over the garden and covered with natural materials, including rice straw, and the new shoots are harvested by hand.

=== Nara Prefecture ===
Tea produced in Nara Prefecture is generally known as Yamato tea. Its principal production areas are located in the Yamato Plateau, particularly around Nara, Yamazoe, Uda, Ōyodo, and Higashiyoshino. Sencha, kabusecha, tencha, and bancha are produced in the prefecture.

Nara is identified by the Ministry of Agriculture, Forestry and Fisheries as one of Japan's principal kabusecha-producing regions.

=== Aichi Prefecture ===
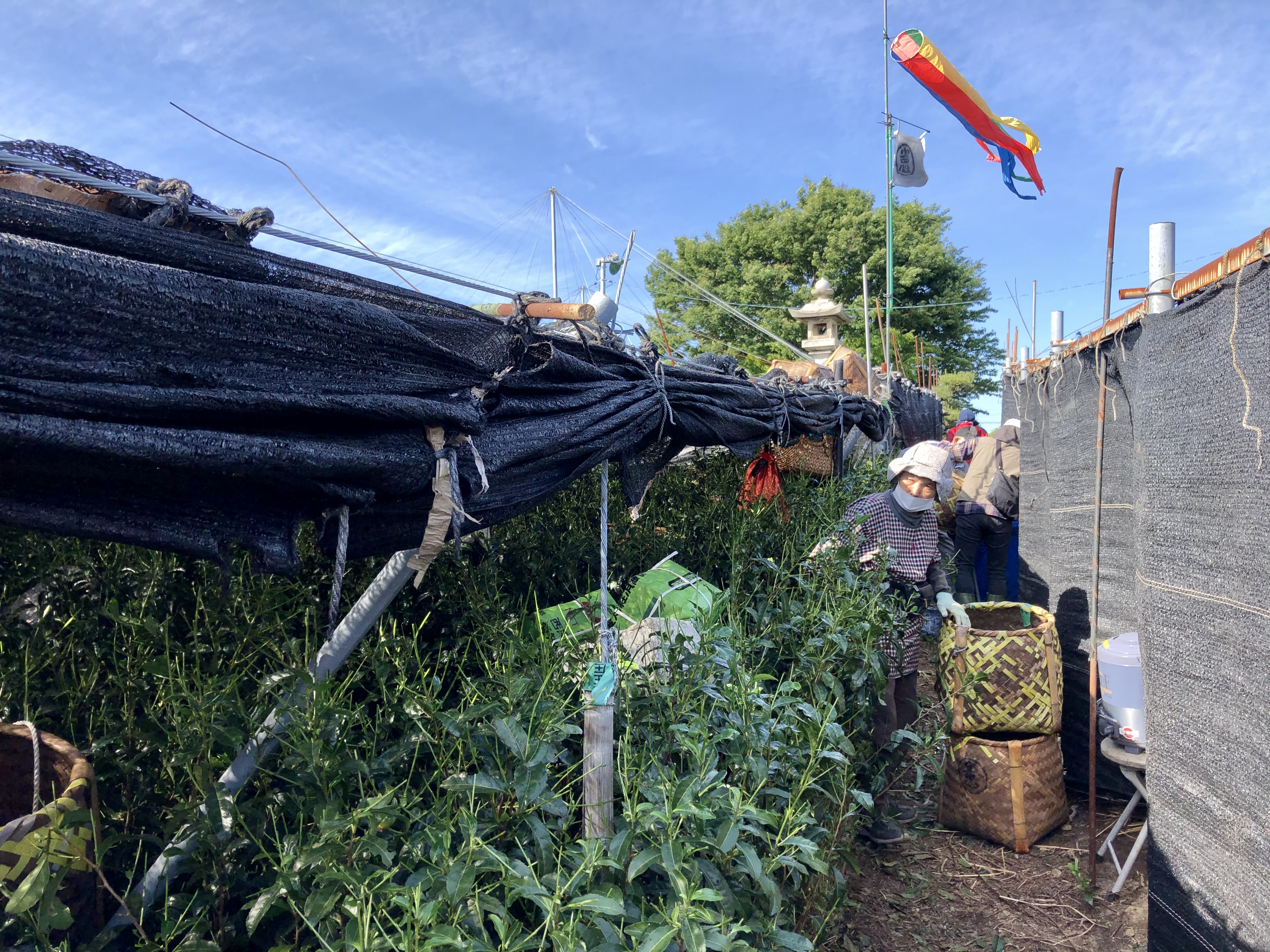
A covered tea garden in Nishio, Aichi

The western Mikawa region of Aichi Prefecture, particularly the area around Nishio, has a long-established tencha industry. Overhead shading and hand harvesting are used for some of the prefecture's higher-quality tencha.

In 2024, tencha accounted for 77 per cent of Aichi's crude-tea production. The prefecture produced 428 tonnes of tencha, ranking fourth nationally with an 8-per-cent share. Aichi had ranked second until 2017, but its share declined as tea-producing regions in other prefectures converted sencha production to tencha in response to expanding global matcha demand.

Matcha produced and processed in Nishio and neighbouring municipalities is marketed as "Nishio Matcha". The name was registered as a Japanese regional collective trademark in 2009.

=== Shizuoka Prefecture ===
Shizuoka Prefecture is primarily associated with sencha and deep-steamed tea, but the Asahina district of Okabe in Fujieda is a noted gyokuro-producing region.

The prefecture is also a major producer of tencha and kabusecha.

=== Kagoshima Prefecture ===
Tencha production in Kagoshima Prefecture expanded substantially during the 2010s. In 2020, the prefecture surpassed Kyoto in tencha production. Kagoshima's tea industry includes large, mechanised tea plantations, and the average cultivated area per tea-growing enterprise is larger than in Japan's other principal tea-producing prefectures.
