= Dian cha =

Method of preparing and drinking tea

Dian cha (Chinese: 點茶), is a method of preparing and drinking tea in the Sinosphere, including China, Japan, and Vietnam. It later evolved into the Japanese tea ceremony using matcha.

This art originated in China. It was popular in China during the Song dynasty and was one of the "four arts" of the Song dynasty. In Vietnam, dian cha (Tiếng Việt: điểm trà) was probably popular during the Trần and Lê dynasties. However, by the end of Revival Lê dynasty, this method in Vietnam had been lost. In China, dian cha also gradually declined during the Ming dynasty. Today, the art of dian cha in which using matcha is still popular and preserved in Japan. This is the main art used in Japanese tea ceremony.

== Dian cha in the countries ==
=== China ===
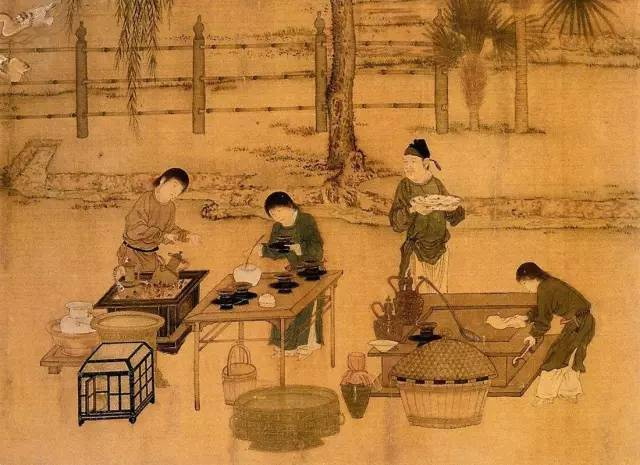
Dian cha in "Eighteen Scholars" (十八學士圖卷) of the Tang, re-drawn in Huizong of Song era.

Dian cha was one of the two popular methods of making tea during the Song dynasty. Drinking tea was also one of the important elegant pleasures, forming a typical lifestyle for literati and scholars.

Song dynasty matcha was made into tea cakes. Before drinking, it would need to be ground and sifted into a fine powder. It was also necessary to warm the cup before brewing the tea, otherwise the matcha would not float easily.

The froth, colour and patterns formed by the whisked tea were aesthetically important for the elites and whisking was considered a gentleman's skill. The whisked frothy teas led to the rise in popularity of dark patterned bowls in which the texture of the thick whisked tea could be more easily judged, as the white froth contrasted more easily with dark bowls.

The best of these bowls were the Jian ware made in the Jianzhou kilns, glazed in patterns with names like oil spot, partridge feather, hare's fur, and tortoise shell. These styles are still highly valued today. The patterned holding bowl and tea mixture were often lauded in the period's poetry, with phrases such as "partridge in swirling clouds" or "snow on Hare's fur." A popular pastime was to create use various implements like spoons to create art on the tea froth which would depict things like birds, fish, flowers and plants.

=== Vietnam ===
In Vietnam, dian cha method was popular during the Trần and Initial Lê dynasties, alongside the practice of boiled tea method. The tea-lighting method was recorded in "Quần thư tham khảo" and "Bị khảo lục" (備考錄) written by Phạm Đình Hổ (范廷琥, 1768 - 1839). However, by the end of Revival Lê dynasty, this method in Vietnam had been lost.

Many chawan and tea-setting utensils were found at Imperial Citadel of Thăng Long with designs similar to Song dynasty tea utensils of China and Japan.
