= Konacha =

Japanese green tea

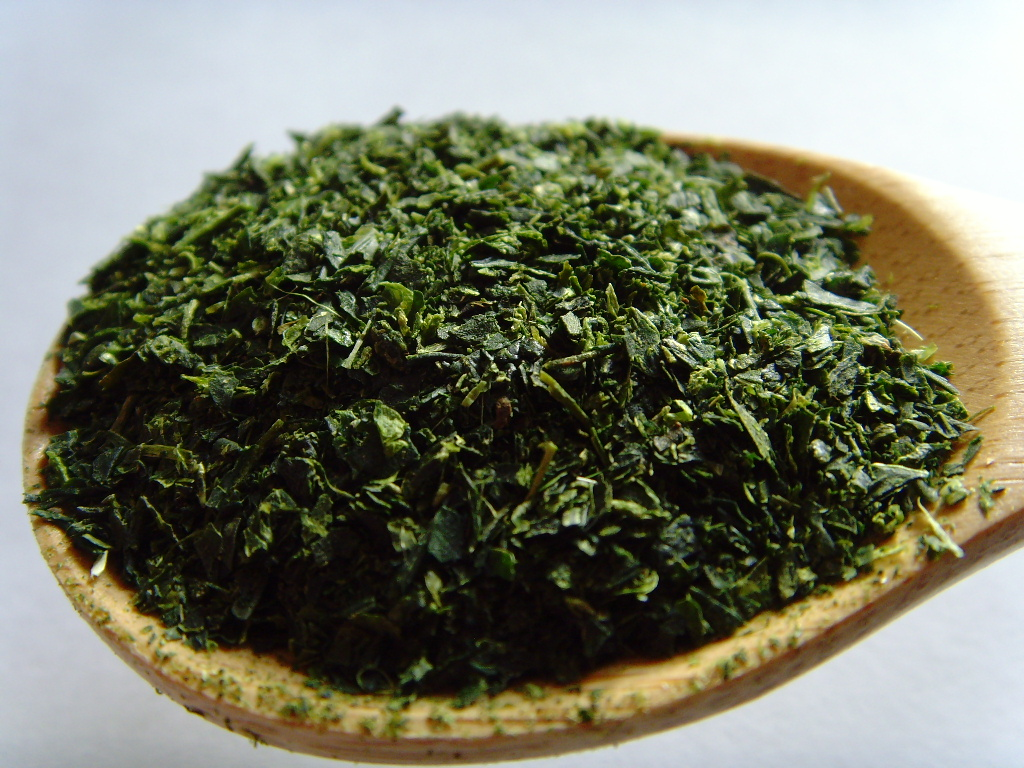
- Type: Green
- Other names: Bud Tea
- Origin: Japan
- Quick description: Dark green, strongly-flavored, lower-grade tea

Konacha (粉茶; powder tea) is a type of green tea, composed of the dust, tea buds and small leaves that are left behind after processing Gyokuro or Sencha. When made from Gyokuro it is also marketed as Gyokurokonacha (玉露粉茶). Konacha is cheaper than Sencha and Matcha and is often served at sushi restaurants as palate-refresher that stands up to fish flavours under the name of agari. Konacha has a strong flavor and is therefore good for use in cooking.

== See also ==
- List of Japanese teas
