= Tencha =

Japanese green tea used to make matcha

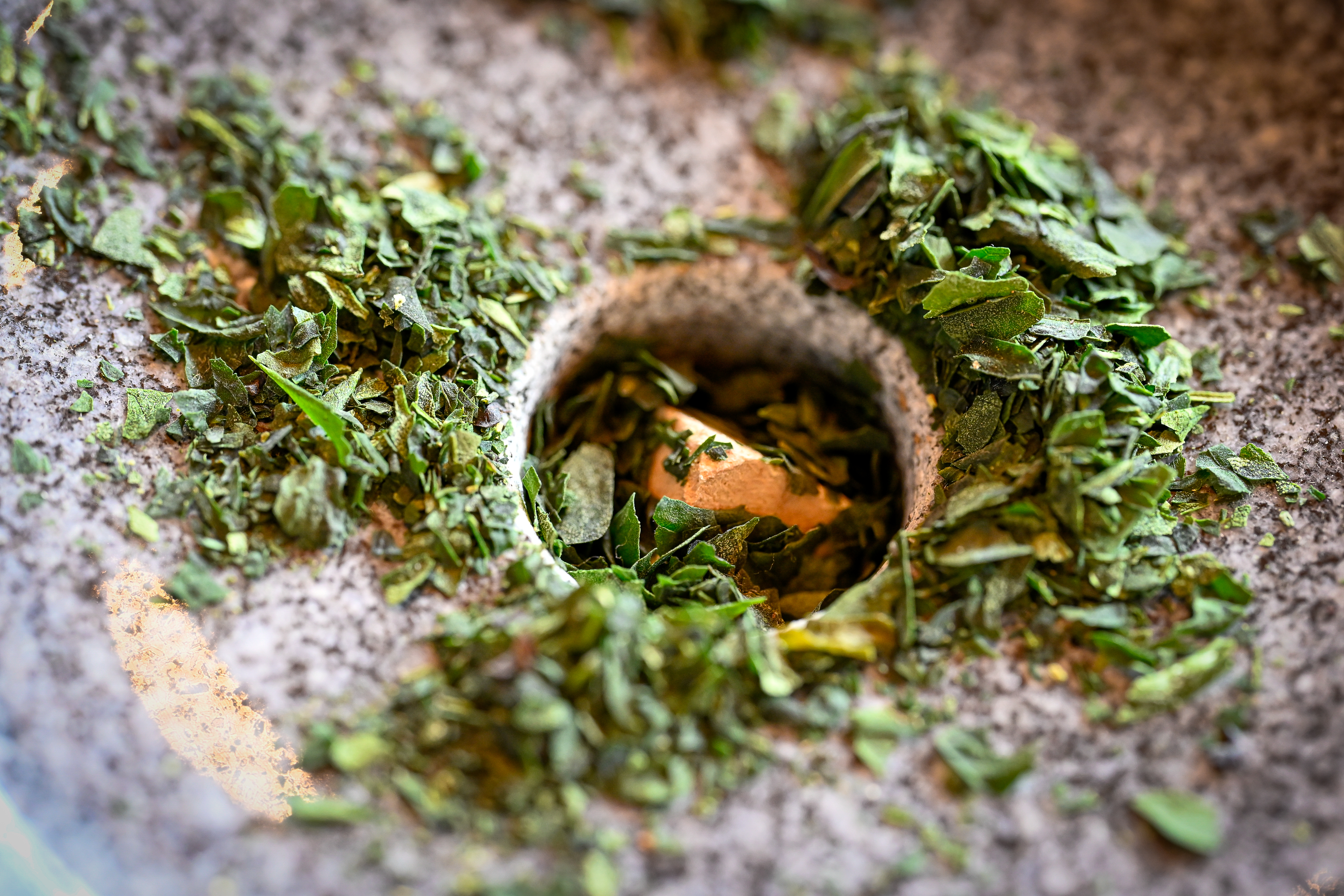
Tencha leaves placed in a traditional stone mill for grinding into matcha in Uji, Kyoto Prefecture

Tencha (Japanese: 碾茶; lit. 'tea for grinding') is a type of Japanese green tea used primarily as the raw material for matcha. It is produced from tea leaves that are shaded for a period before harvesting, steamed, and dried without being rolled. The product obtained through primary processing is called tencha aracha, or crude tencha. After sorting, cutting, and final drying, the finished tencha is ground in a stone mill or another fine grinder to produce matcha.

The shaded cultivation used to produce tencha developed in Uji, Kyoto Prefecture. Production has increased with rising demand for matcha. In 2025, Japan produced 6,278 tonnes of tencha, approximately 3.2 times the 2014 level, and tencha accounted for 8.6 percent of the country's crude-tea output. The principal producing prefectures were Kagoshima, Kyoto, and Shizuoka.

== Definition and name ==
Under the Green Tea Labeling Standards of the Japan Tea Central Public Interest Incorporated Association, tencha is defined as tea made from leaves harvested from a covered tea garden. Before harvesting, the garden is covered for approximately two to three weeks using overhead frames and materials such as reed screens, straw mats, or synthetic fabric. The harvested leaves are steamed and dried without rolling in a tencha dryer or similar apparatus.

The character 碾 refers to grinding with a mill. The name tencha therefore denotes tea intended to be ground. Tencha itself is not powdered; matcha is produced by grinding finished tencha into a fine powder. Under the same labeling standards, powder made by grinding tea other than tencha is classified as funmatsucha (粉末茶, powdered tea), rather than matcha.

Like tencha, gyokuro is produced from shade-grown leaves. Gyokuro, however, is rolled and dried using a process similar to that employed for sencha, whereas tencha is dried without rolling, leaving the leaf pieces flat and open.

The labeling standards also recognize the designation food-processing tencha. This category includes autumn tencha and other tea leaves dried without rolling in a tencha dryer and intended primarily for use as ingredients in processed foods.

== Cultivation ==
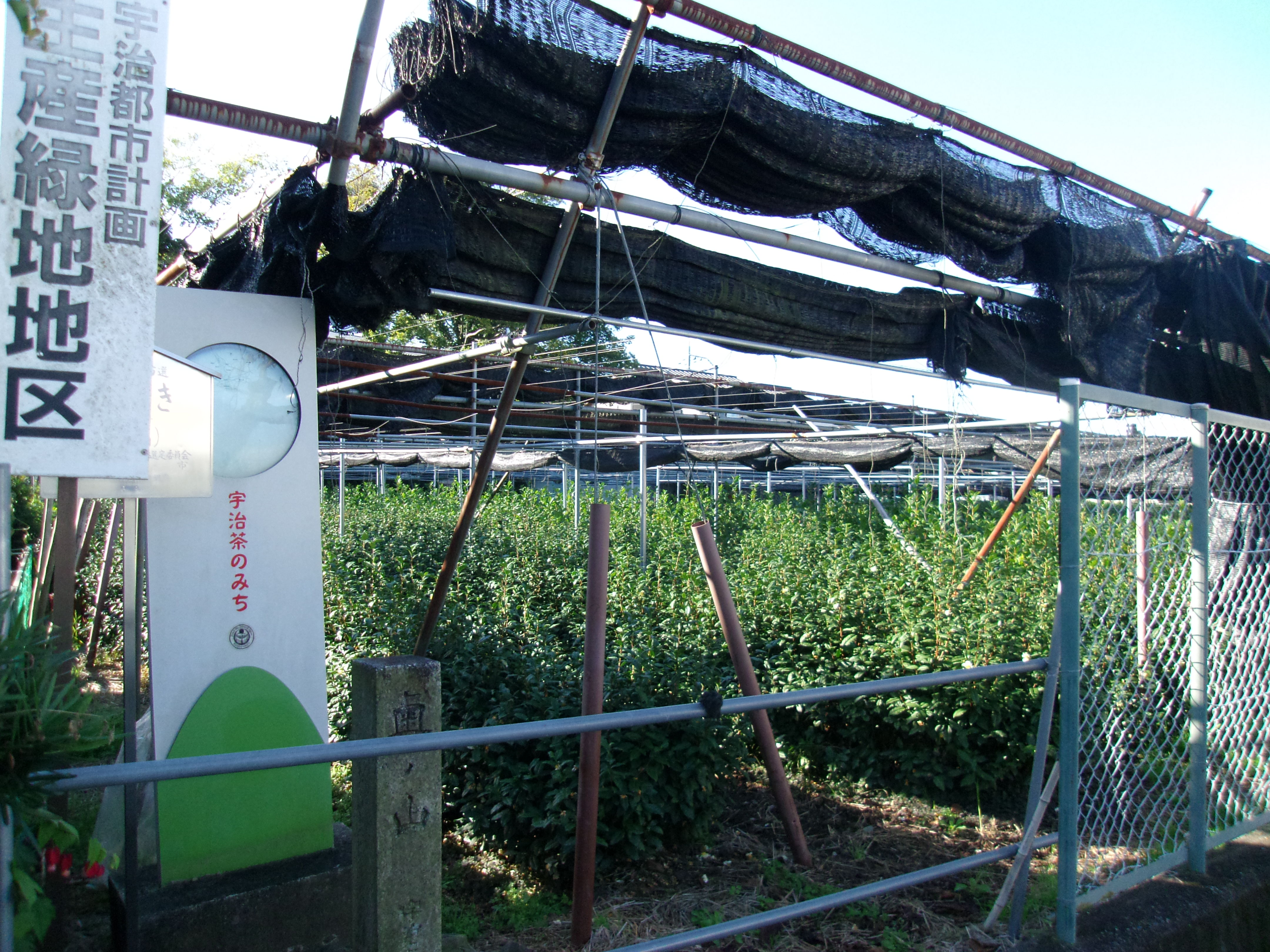
Shading frames at the Okunoyama tea plantation in Uji, Kyoto Prefecture

Tea leaves for tencha are produced using shaded cultivation. During the growth of the new shoots, the tea garden is covered to reduce the amount of sunlight reaching the leaves.

In the traditional method practiced in Uji, a framework of wood or bamboo is constructed over the tea plants. Reed screens are spread over the framework and covered with rice straw. This method is known as honzu (本簀). Modern tea gardens commonly use steel-pipe frames and synthetic-fiber covering materials instead.

For high-grade tencha, tea bushes may be allowed to grow in a relatively natural form, and the young shoots are harvested by hand. To produce larger quantities, particularly for food-processing use, tea bushes may be trained into curved hedges and harvested mechanically.

Shading causes the leaves to become thinner and increases their chlorophyll content, producing a deeper green color. It also promotes the accumulation of free amino acids, particularly theanine, while suppressing the formation of catechins associated with bitterness and astringency. These changes contribute to tencha's umami and sweetness, its green color, and the characteristic aroma of shade-grown tea known as ōika (覆い香, "covering aroma").

== Processing ==
Tencha production consists broadly of primary processing, in which freshly harvested leaves are made into crude tea, and finishing, in which the crude tea is sorted, cut, and dried again. Primary processing is generally carried out by tea growers, while finishing and grinding are commonly performed by tea wholesalers or manufacturers.

=== Primary processing ===
Freshly harvested leaves are steamed to deactivate the enzymes responsible for oxidation. Steaming also softens the leaves and reduces their raw, grassy odor. The leaves are generally treated with steam at approximately 100 to 105 °C (212 to 221 °F) for 10 to 15 seconds.

After steaming, the leaves are blown upward in a cooling and spreading machine. This rapidly cools them, removes surface moisture, and separates leaves that have folded or adhered to one another. The opened leaves are then distributed over a wire-mesh conveyor and passed through a tencha dryer.

The leaves are dried without rolling. Stems and larger veins are subsequently separated, and the material is dried again to produce tencha aracha, or crude tencha. Because no rolling is performed, the leaves remain as flat, irregular pieces rather than being formed into the needle-like shape characteristic of sencha.

=== Finishing ===
During finishing, foreign material is removed from the crude tencha, and the leaf blades are cut into pieces suitable for grinding. The harder veins are removed, and the leaf material is generally cut into pieces approximately 5 mm (0.20 in) square. A final drying process is then used to adjust the flavor and aroma.

Finished tencha is ground in a stone mill or another fine grinder to make matcha. Grinding is therefore not part of tencha production itself, but the subsequent process by which tencha is converted into matcha.

=== Tencha dryers ===
A tencha dryer, or tencha-ro (碾茶炉), contains a tunnel-shaped drying chamber. The opened steamed leaves are spread over wire-mesh conveyors and dried by radiant heat, conducted heat, and hot air as they pass through the chamber. A dryer generally contains three to five vertically arranged conveyor levels.

Modern tencha machines are generally continuous dryers in which the leaves travel through the entire process on conveyor belts. Stronger heat is applied during the initial stage to remove moisture rapidly. As drying progresses, the temperature is reduced and the heating period is lengthened. This controlled heating contributes to the color and aroma characteristic of tencha.

The basic design of most modern machines derives from the Horii-type tencha dryer. Mechanization developed from the Taishō era through the early Shōwa era, replacing manual drying over traditional roasting tables. The basic structure established during this period continues to be used in contemporary tencha dryers.

== Characteristics and quality ==
Because tencha is not rolled, it consists of thin, flat, open leaf pieces rather than the narrow needles of sencha. High-quality tencha is characterized by a vivid green color, a distinctive aroma, and a mild, full-bodied flavor.

The amino acids and carotenoids that increase during shaded cultivation contribute to the flavor and aroma of tencha and matcha. One of the principal compounds associated with the characteristic covering aroma is dimethyl sulfide, which is generated from a precursor in the leaves during heating. Ionone-related aroma compounds are also formed during processing from carotenoids that have accumulated in the shaded leaves.

A study comparing commercially produced crude tencha with teas entered in competitions found significant positive correlations between sensory-evaluation scores and the concentrations of total nitrogen and free amino acids in both groups. The study identified total nitrogen and free amino-acid content as potential indicators of the quality of tencha and the fresh leaves from which it is made.

== History ==
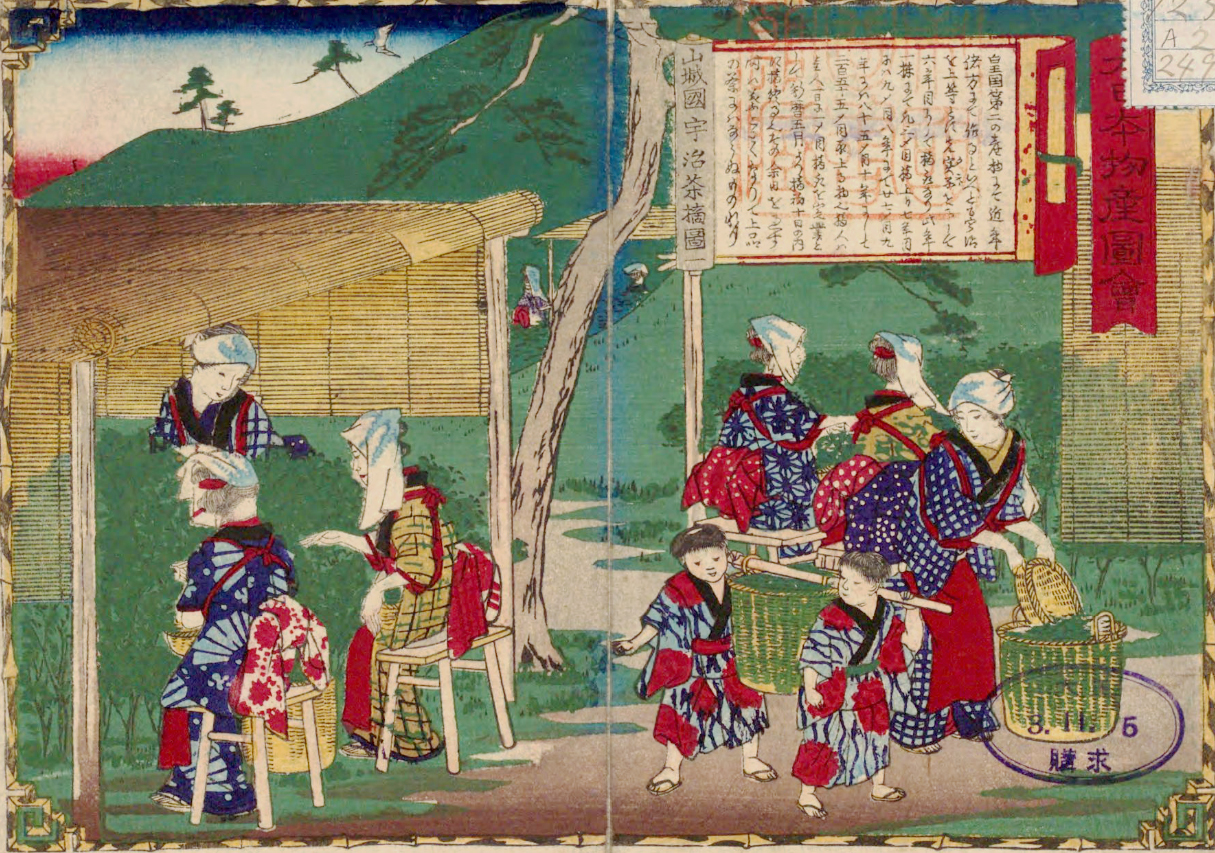
Tea picking at a shaded tea garden in Uji, depicted in The Tea Picking in Uji, Yamashiro Province (1877)

The shaded cultivation characteristic of modern tencha developed in Uji. A technical review published in 2015 stated that shaded cultivation had become established in the Uji region by the middle of the 16th century.

A soil study published in 2019 examined the Okunoyama tea plantation, the only surviving plantation traditionally counted among the Seven Famous Tea Gardens of Uji. The researchers analyzed soil carbon content, phytolith composition, and radiocarbon dates. They estimated that the traditional system of shading tea plants with reed screens and rice straw had been established there by the first half of the 15th century, approximately 150 years earlier than the date previously inferred from historical documents.

The shading system later developed into the honzu method, in which reed screens and rice straw were supported above the tea garden. The manufacturing process was mechanized from the Taishō era through the early Shōwa era, when specialized tencha dryers replaced much of the earlier manual drying process.

== Production and producing regions ==
Japanese tencha production has expanded in response to increased demand for matcha. National production reached 6,278 tonnes in 2025, approximately 3.2 times its 2014 level. In 2025, tencha accounted for 8.6 percent of Japan's total crude-tea output.

In 2025, Kagoshima Prefecture ranked first in tencha production, followed by Kyoto and Shizuoka prefectures. Kagoshima also ranked first in Japan's total production of crude tea in both 2024 and 2025, with 2024 marking the first time it had held the national lead since the statistics began.

The average crude-tea price of tencha in 2025 was ¥8,562 per kilogram, compared with ¥1,746 per kilogram for sencha. The average price of tencha was therefore approximately 4.9 times that of sencha.

== See also ==
- Matcha
- Aracha
- Gyokuro
- Kabusecha
- Uji tea
- Tea culture in Japan
- Tea processing
