= Chinese tea culture =

Preparation and occasions of tea consumption in China

Traditional tea processing techniques and associated social practices in China
- UNESCO Intangible Cultural Heritage
- Country: China
- Reference: 1884
- Region: Asia and the Pacific

Inscription history
- Inscription: 2022 (14 session)

Chinese tea culture
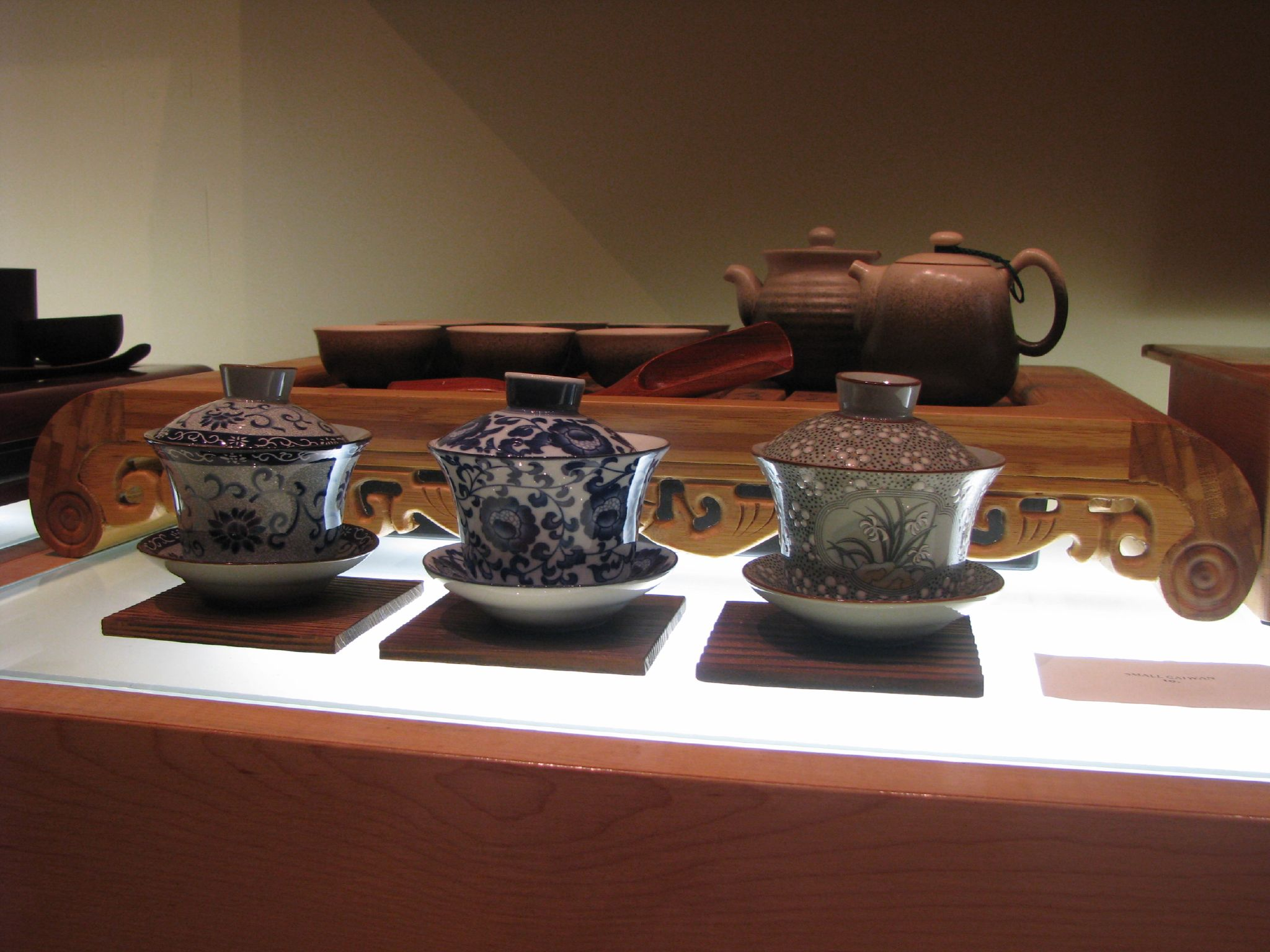
- Chinese tea sets
- Traditional Chinese: 中國茶文化
- Simplified Chinese: 中国茶文化
- Literal meaning: Chinese tea culture
Transcriptions
Standard Mandarin
- Hanyu Pinyin: Zhōngguó chá wénhuà
- Wade–Giles: Chung-kuo cha wen-hua

Alternative Chinese name
- Traditional Chinese: 茶藝
- Simplified Chinese: 茶艺
Transcriptions
Standard Mandarin
- Hanyu Pinyin: cháyì
- Wade–Giles: cha-i

Second alternative Chinese name
- Chinese: 茶道
- Literal meaning: The Way of Tea
Transcriptions
Standard Mandarin
- Hanyu Pinyin: chádào
- Wade–Giles: cha-tao

Third alternative Chinese name
- Traditional Chinese: 茶禮
- Simplified Chinese: 茶礼
- Literal meaning: The Rite(s) of Tea
Transcriptions
Standard Mandarin
- Hanyu Pinyin: chálǐ
- Wade–Giles: cha-li

Chinese tea culture includes all facets of tea (Chinese: 茶; pinyin: chá) found in Chinese culture throughout history. Physically, it consists of tea cultivation, brewing, serving, consumption, arts, and ceremonial aspects. Tea culture is an integral part of traditional Chinese material culture and spiritual culture. Tea culture emerged in the Tang dynasty, and flourished in the succeeding eras as a major cultural practice and as a major export good.

Chinese tea culture heavily influenced the cultures in neighboring East Asian countries, such as Japan and Korea, with each country developing a slightly different form of the tea ceremony. Chinese tea culture, especially the material aspects of tea cultivation, processing, and teaware also influenced later adopters of tea, such as India, the United Kingdom, and Russia (even though these tea cultures diverge considerably in preparation and taste).

Tea is still consumed regularly in modern China, both on casual and formal occasions. In addition to being a popular beverage, tea is used as an integral ingredient in traditional Chinese medicine as well as in Chinese cuisine.

Tea also holds symbolic significance in the Five Elements (wuxing) theory. The tea plant represents Wood; pan-firing adds Fire and Metal; brewing uses Water; and ceramic serving embodies Earth. This cycle harmonizes all elements in one cup, reflecting Daoist balance.

== Etymology ==
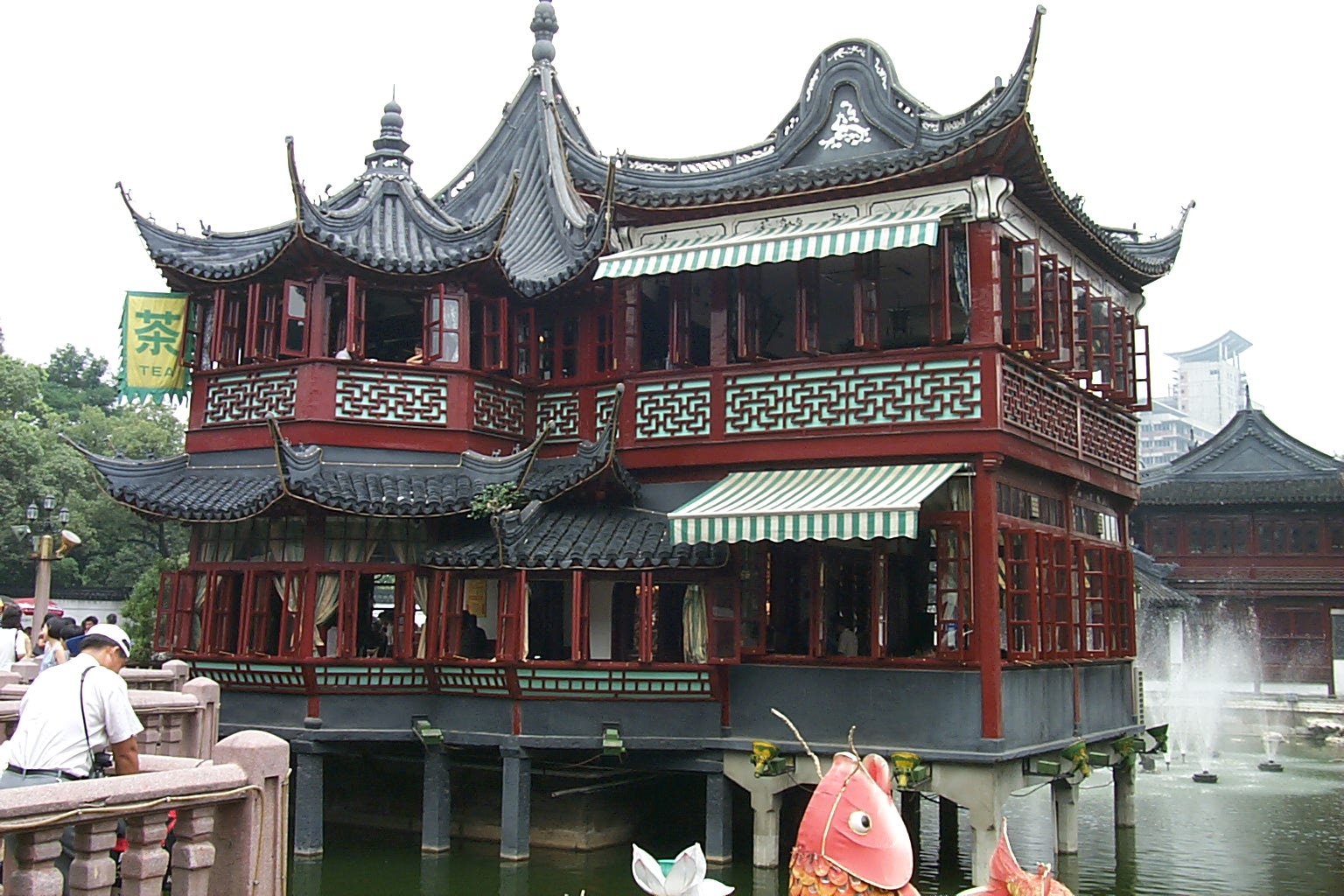
A tea house in Shanghai, China

The concept of tea culture is referred to in Chinese as chayi ("the art of drinking tea"), or cha wenhua ("tea culture"). The word cha (茶) denotes the beverage that is derived from Camellia sinensis, the tea plant. Prior to the 8th century BCE, tea was known collectively under the term tú (荼) along with a great number of other bitter plants. This term is found in the Shi Jing (Classic of Poetry). These two Chinese characters are identical, with the exception of an additional horizontal stroke in the Chinese lettering 荼, which translates to tea. The older character is made up of the radical cǎo (艸) in its reduced form of 艹 and the character yú (余), which gives the phonetic cue.

During the Han dynasty, the word tu took on a new pronunciation, cha, in addition to its old pronunciation tu. The syllable tu (荼) later evolved into te in the Fujian dialect, and later 'tea', 'te'.

Tea was also called jia (檟) in the ancient Chinese classic Er Ya compiled during the early Han dynasty which states: "Jia is bitter tu". The word tu was further annotated by a Jin scholar, Guo Pu (276–324 CE): "Tu is a small plant, its leaves can be brewed into a beverage". Tea was also called she (蔎) in a West Han monograph on dialect called the Fang Yian. The syllable jia (檟) later became cha and 'chai' (Russia, India). Meanwhile, the syllable she (蔎) later became 'soh' in Jiangsu, Suleiman's 'Sakh' also came from 'she'.

== History ==
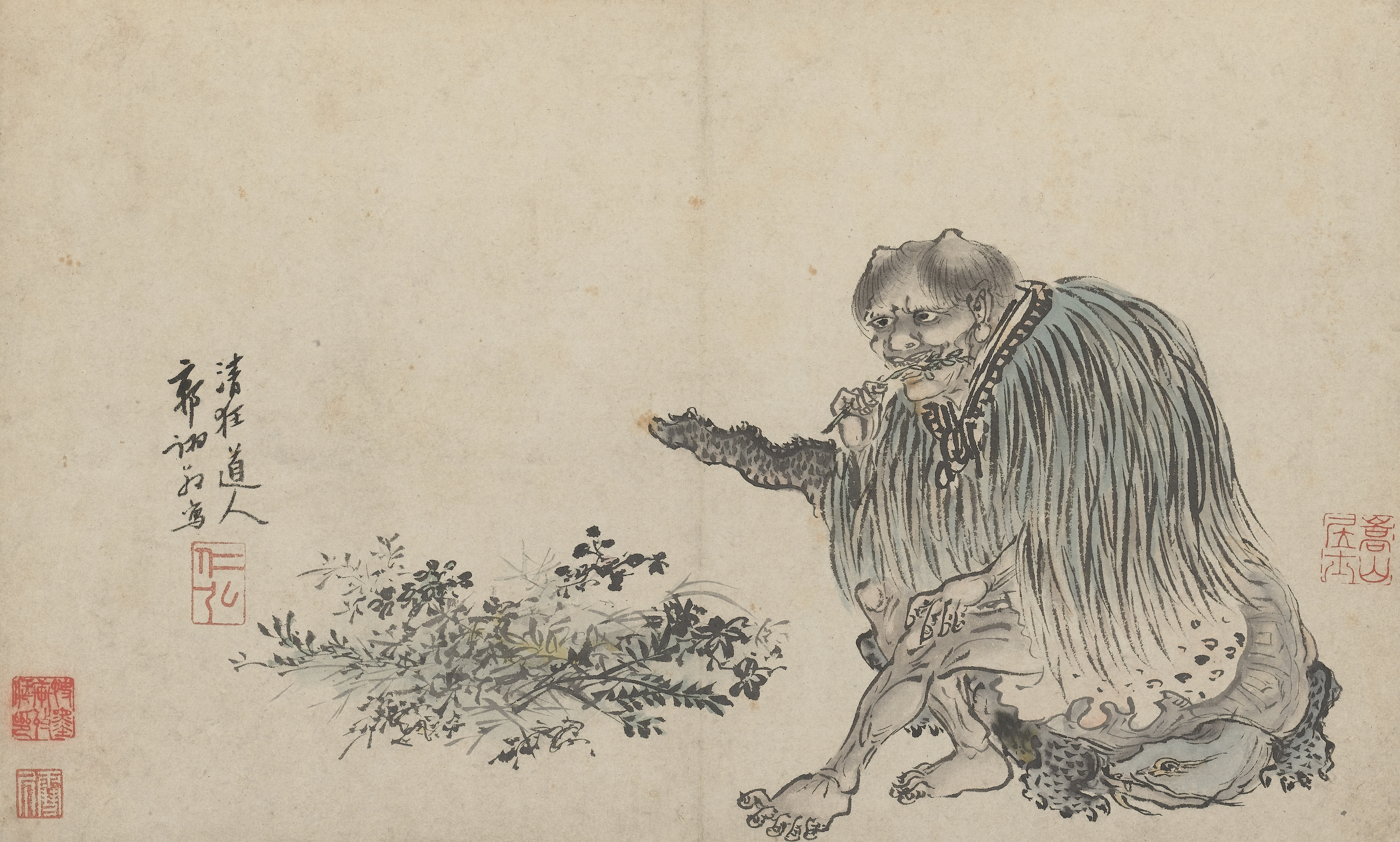
Shennong tasting herbs, c. 1503, painting by Guo Xu

=== Legends ===
Tea was identified in Southwest China over four thousand years ago. Ancient Chinese sources like the Classic of Tea and the Shennong Ben Cao Jing credit Shen Nong, a mythical patron of medicine and agriculture, as the first person to discover the effects of tea in China. He was known to have tasted numerous leaves to determine if they could be used as food or medicine. According to legend, there are two different accounts telling how he discovered tea's beneficial attributes. First, it is said he had a transparent stomach where he could see how his stomach was reacting to what he ate. After a long day of picking leaves, he was tired, and when he was boiling water, some leaves fell in. It was sweet when he drank the water, and he enjoyed the taste. Soon after that, he became more energized. In the second accounting, Shen Nong tasted 72 poisonous leaves and became very sick, and was close to death. When some leaves fell beside him, he put them in his mouth and chewed them. Before long, he was feeling better and more energized, so he ate more leaves. Soon after, the poison left his body. The first book written about the medical effects of tea was the Shen Nong Herbal.

=== Pre-history ===
The geographical home of tea in China is in the southern regions (such as Yunnan and Sichuan), the homelands of the Hani, Yi, Bai, Dai, Bulang, Wa, and De'ang ethnic groups. It is believed that various peoples from southern China had been eating tea leaves since ancient pre-historic times. These ethnic groups continue to eat tea leaves in traditional ways today.

=== The early dynasties ===
11th to 7th century BCE Chinese sources mention a drink called tu (荼; "bitter herb"). While some have seen these mentions as indicating that tea was being consumed at this time, we cannot be sure that this was Camellia sinensis. The question of the identity of tu is a much debated one among modern scholars. The Erya, a Chinese dictionary dated to the 3rd century BCE, records that an infusion of tu, which it defines as a "bitter vegetable". Records also indicate that ritual worship during the Zhou dynasty included ceremonies led by officials which used "bitter herb" drinks. The herb was considered an exotic plant from southern China, so it was offered as tribute to the emperor and was served to the nobles. In the third century BCE, tea is mentioned as an alternative to wine. Xia Zhong's Treatise on Food states "since Jin dynasty, the people of Wu (now Suzhou city) cooked tea leaves as food, and called it tea broth".

From the end of the Spring and Autumn period in the Early Western Han dynasty the "bitter herb" was used as a table vegetable food, often drunk in a soup with onions, ginger and other additives. In 2016, the discovery of the earliest known physical evidence of tea from the mausoleum of Emperor Jing of Han (d. 141 BCE) in Xi'an was announced, indicating that tea from the genus Camellia was drunk by Han dynasty (202 BCE–220 CE) emperors as early as the 2nd century BCE. The first recorded cultivation of tea during the Han is dated to the era of Emperor Xuan (53–50 BC), when tea was planted on Meng Mountain, east of Chengdu where many Buddhist monasteries grew and processed Mengding Ganlu tea (Sweet Dew tea), sending some of it to the emperor as tribute tea. During the Han, improved picking and processing of wild tea refined the taste of tea. According to Victor H. Mair, the processing of tea at this time included steaming the leaves, pounding them and patting them into cakes which were then baked, pierced, and strung together in a string before storage.

During Jin dynasty (266–420), tea was boiled with other plants to make a tea soup which was considered a combination of medicine, food, and drink. According to the 3rd century CE Guangya dictionary, "In the region between Jing and Ba [the area between modern eastern Sichuan and the western parts of Hunan and Hubei] the people pick the leaves and make a cake. If the leaves are old, rice paste is used in forming the cake. [People who] wish to brew the tea first roast [the cake] until it is a reddish color, pound it into a powder, put it into a ceramic container, and cover it with boiling water. They stew scallion [spring onion], ginger, and orange peel with it."

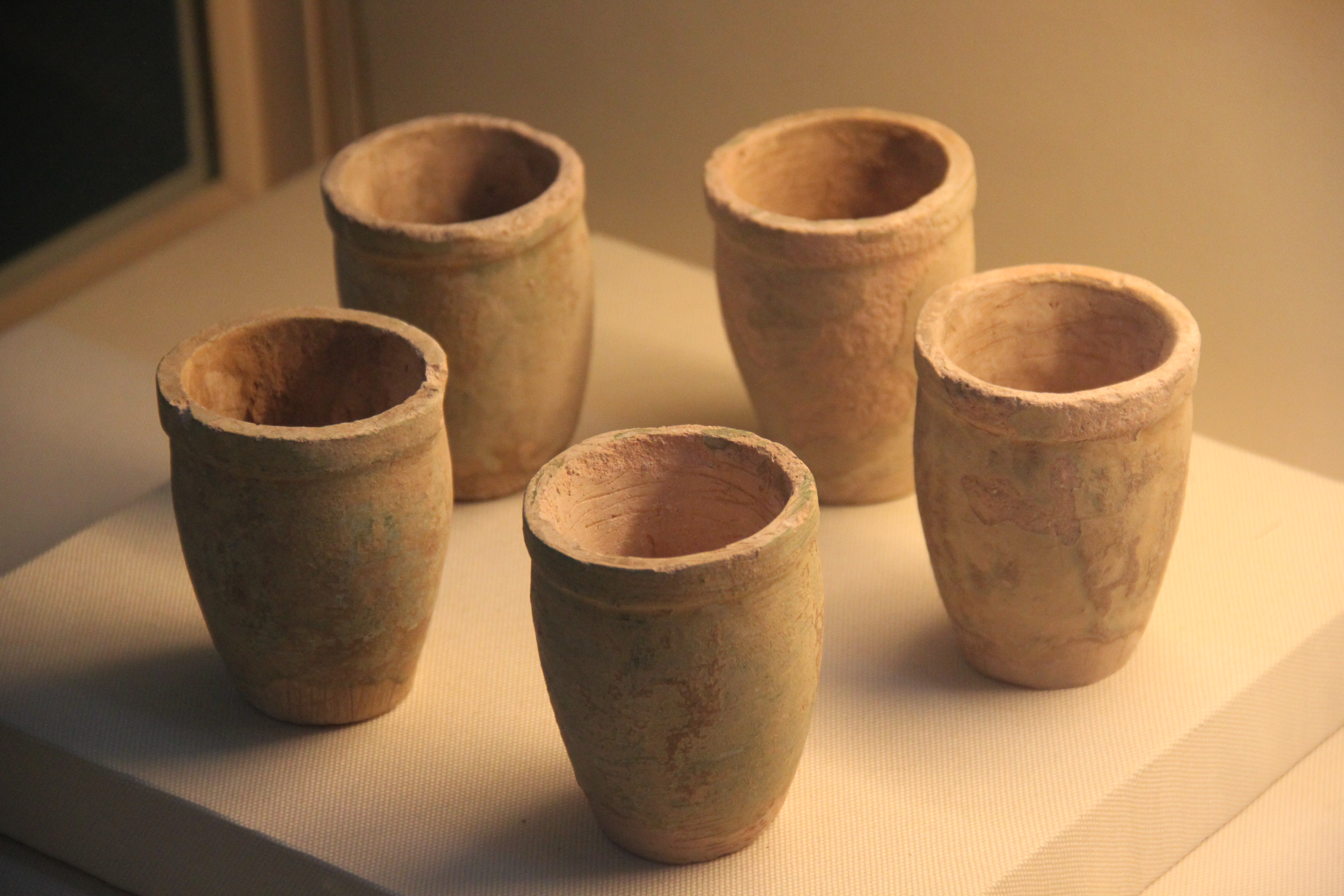
Tea cups, Western Jin dynasty

As the tea culture developed during the Jin (266–420) and Wei period (220–265), it became more popular in the upper classes, including scholar-officials, Buddhist monks, and royals. Tea was set against wine as a beneficial drink, with wine being 'violence and intoxication' and tea 'freshness and purity'. During this period, refined forms of tea became the backdrop to deep philosophical discussions between learned men, Taoists and Buddhist monks. Buddhists believed it helped prevent tiredness and promoted wakefulness, while Taoists believed it kept a person young and healthy.

Before the Tang dynasty, refined tea was consumed as a social drink (as opposed to as a food) mainly by the upper classes. It continued to be used as a vegetable and herb soup by commoners, especially in the south. For the elites, tea was used as a medicinal health drink, a sacrifice, tribute, for ceremonial purposes or as an energizing drink. Refined expensive teas or "tribute teas" like Mengding Ganlu were not available to the masses during this early period.

=== Tang dynasty (618–906) ===
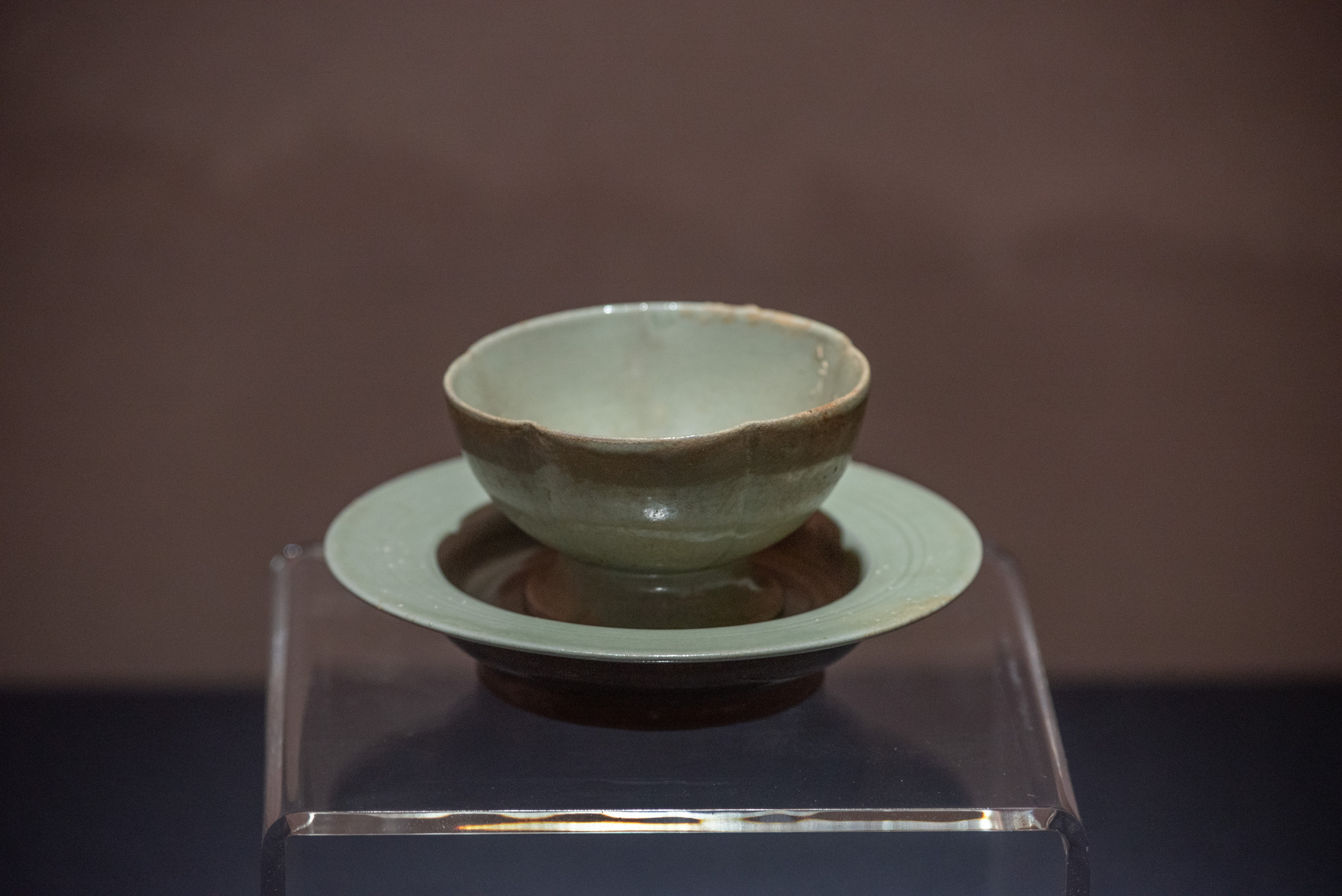
Yue ware celadon cup, Five Dynasties and Ten Kingdoms period

During the Tang dynasty, tea culture or 'the art of tea' as a pleasurable social activity (instead of as food, a ritual or medicine) began to spread widely throughout China. At this time, elite tea was now being drunk mostly on its own instead of as part of a soup, though some additives were still used sometimes, like a pinch of salt or certain kinds of flowers. New methods of growing and processing tea were developed, making it easier to produce more tea (all of which was green tea at this time) and improving its flavor. A new tea-making technique of roasting and baking leaves was also invented during this period. Tea production grew, especially in Meng Mountain region (in Sichuan) and in Fuliang (Jiangxi).

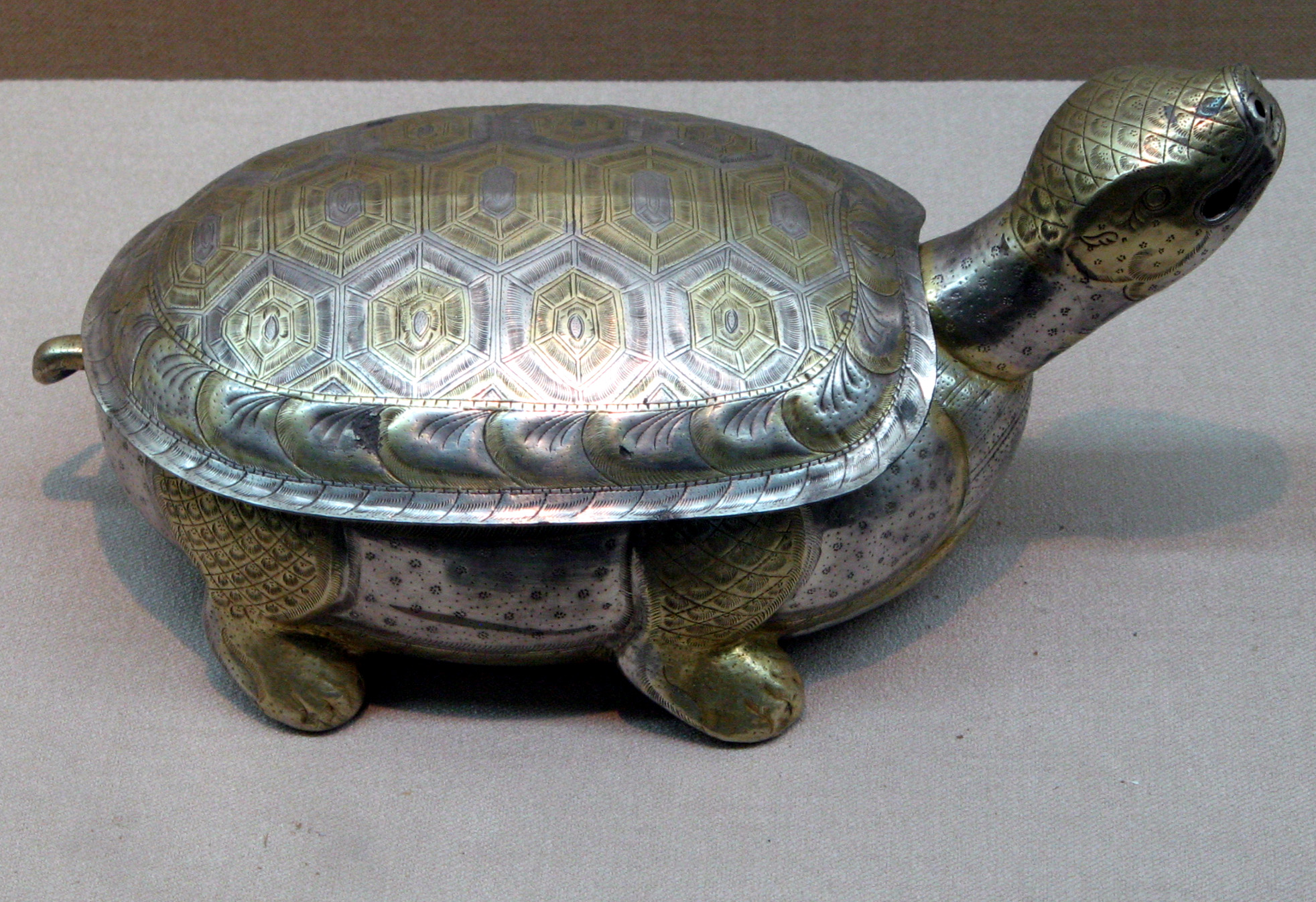
Tang dynasty Turtle-Shaped Tea Container from Famen Temple.

Tea was widely consumed by the Tang emperor and his household, who received the highest quality tea as "tribute tea" from tea producing regions. A famous tribute tea from this time was a purple-shoot tea from Guzhu mountain, on the western side of Lake Tai. Tea also began to be taxed and directly managed during the Tang. This put pressure on the commoners, who were also sometimes press-ganged to harvest tea for the emperor and on merchants, who often resorted to smuggling tea (which could carry the death penalty). Large scale tea smuggling, often by river boat, was a profitable venture for bandits and smugglers during the Tang.

During the Tang era, the southern Tea Horse Road trade network led to mature trade routes between China and Tibet where Chinese tea was traded for Tibetan horses that the Chinese needed for their military. Furthermore, the completion of the Grand Canal established a cost-effective method of transporting goods between northern and southern China, making tea less expensive throughout the empire. Opening up trade routes and new processing techniques was vital to establishing tea as a national drink throughout China. Thus, from the Tang period onward, tea became one of the "seven necessities."

The leading high-end teaware of this period was the celadon Yue ware and the white glazed Xing ware. Both were patronized by the Tang imperial court. Also during this period, artisans produced hundreds of examples of tea art, such as poems, drawings, songs, and literature. Tea houses and tea shops were also established during this time.

==== Buddhism and tea ====
During the Tang, tea became a central part of the life of Buddhist monks, who were not allowed to drink alcohol or eat solid food after noon as per the Buddhist monastic code. According to Victor H. Mair, "the monks cultivated tea, drank it for meditation, while studying, and during ceremonies, offered tea to the Buddha, presented it as a gift to visitors, sold it, and sent it as tribute to the imperial court, which in turn reciprocated." Buddhist tea culture (which was centered in Southern China) in turn popularized tea wherever Buddhist monasteries were built. A Record of Things Seen and Heard by Mr. Feng (c. 800) states that a Chan Buddhist master on Mount Tai promoted tea, and his monks carried it everywhere. Furthermore,

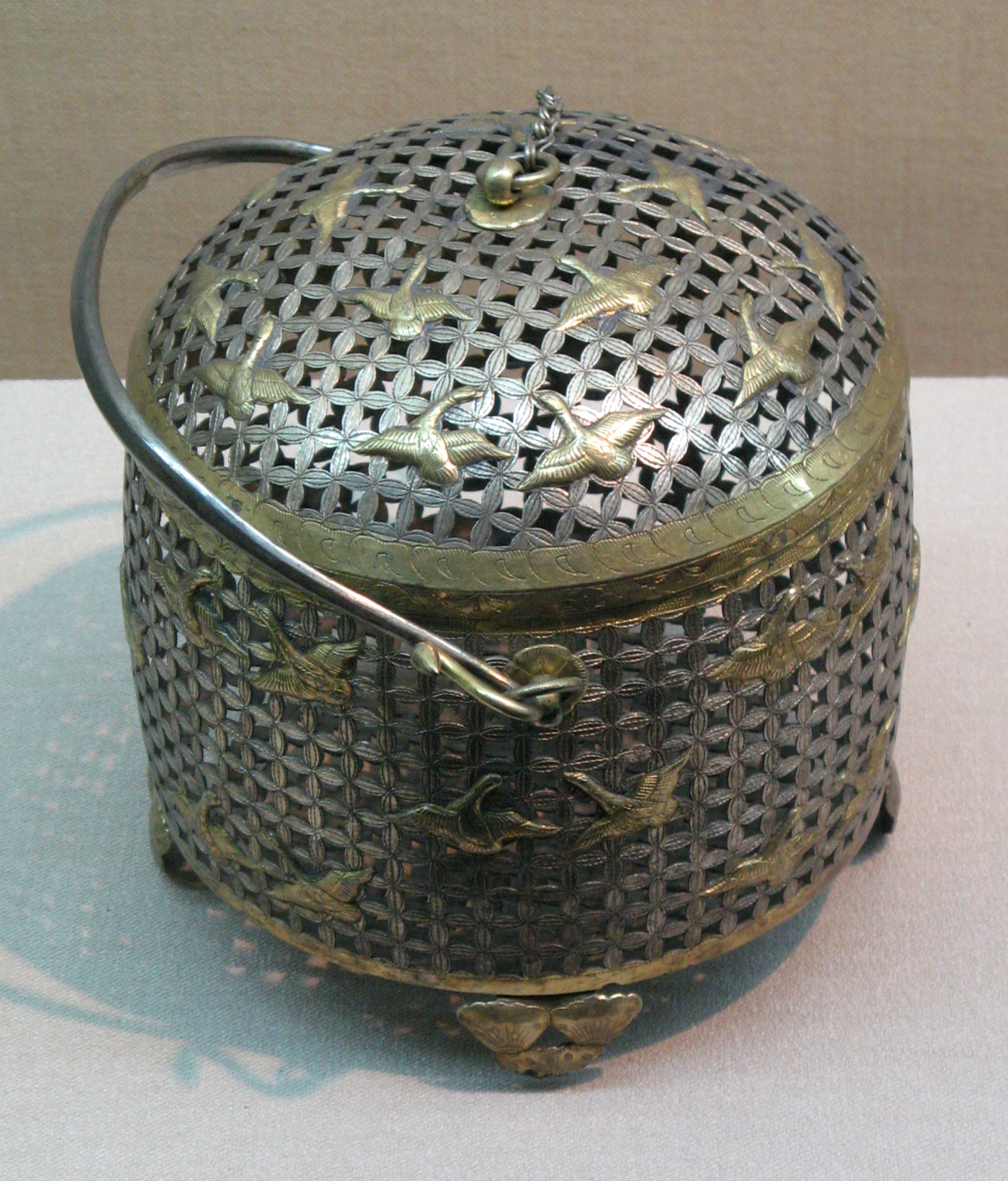
Tea-Leaf Container with gold geese, from Famen temple.

This habit was in turn imitated by others, and became a custom. From Zou, Qi, Cang and Di [places in Shandong, where Mount Tai is located, and neighboring Hebei province] it gradually spread to the capital. Many shops making and selling tea opened in the markets, and people, whether religious or lay, pay money to drink it. The tea arrives in a constant stream of boats and carts from Jiang and Huai [in the south], and is piled up in mountains, with many different types.

In this way, a tea drinking culture, which was mainly centered in the south, was widely transmitted to the north through Buddhist channels. Famen Temple (Xi'an) was one important Buddhist monastery that was associated with tea culture. A cache of imperial grade teaware and tea tools were found in this temple.

It was also during the Tang that Japanese Buddhist monks visited China and returned home with tea. The most famous figures who first introduced Chinese tea to Japan are Saichō (who stayed at Fulong Temple, Mount Tai.) and Kūkai (who stayed at Ximing Temple, Chang'an). The first recorded cultivation of tea in Japan was by Saichō, who planted some tea plants at Mt Hiei. Similarly, Buddhist monks also brought tea to Korea during this era and Korean tea history is closely connected to the history of Korean Buddhism and its links with Chinese Buddhist tea drinking communities. Korean histories like Samkuk-yusa and Samkuk-sagi also indicate that Korean royals were drinking tea by the 7th century, which was mostly sourced from China.

==== The Classic of Tea ====
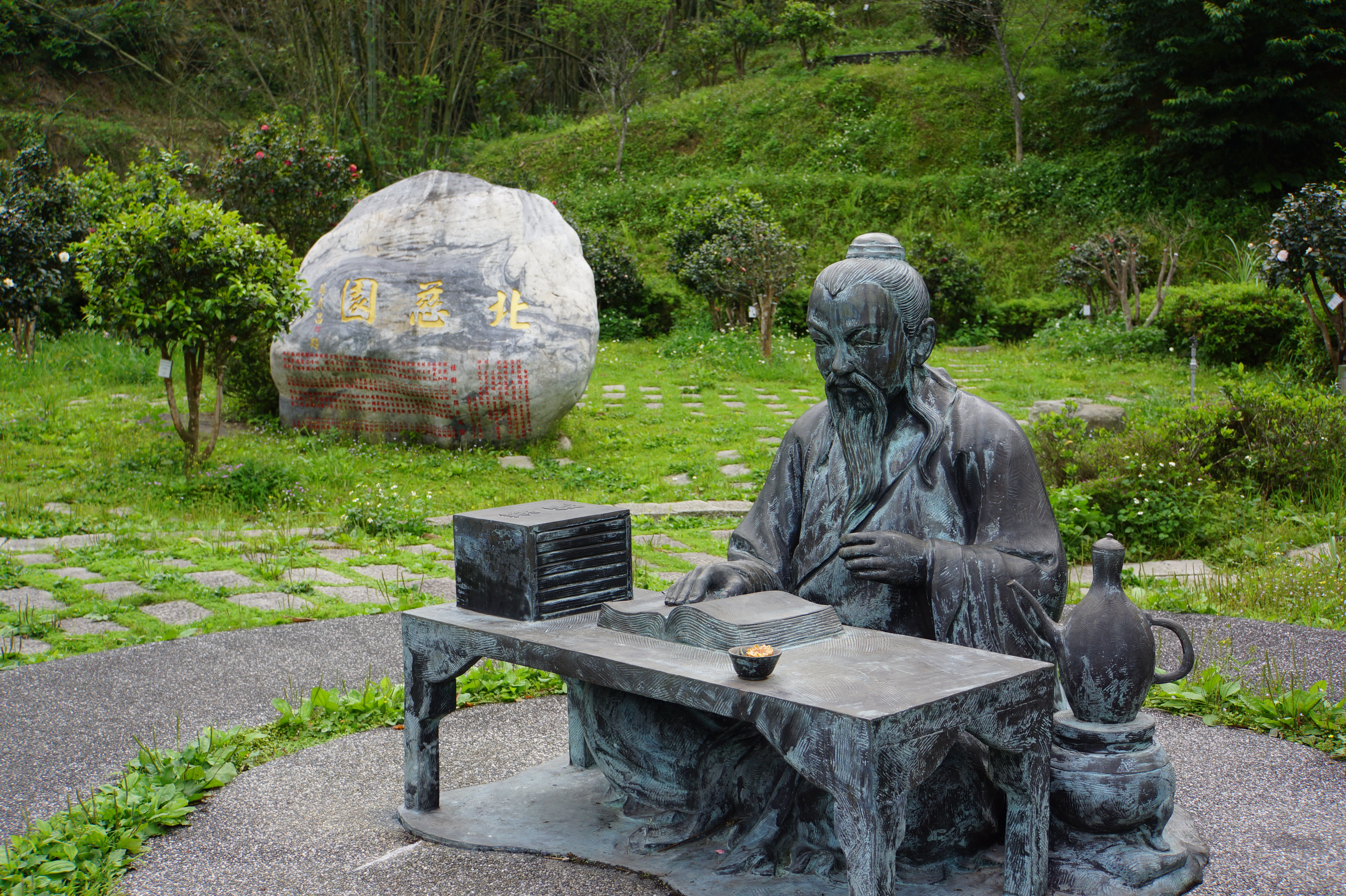
Lu Yu statue, Taiwan

The Classic of Tea (Chájīng, c. 760–762 CE) was a significant contribution to the evolution of tea culture during the Tang dynasty. An important work of literature by tea connoisseur Lu Yu, the book provides an extensive overview of Tang tea culture and industry. The Classic of Tea was the first monograph regarding the study of tea, which consisted of ten chapters ranging from the history of tea, its cultivation, and how to prepare, serve, and drink it. The book describes how tea plants were grown, the leaves processed, and how tea prepared as a beverage through grinding tea bricks into powder and whisking it in a bowl. The book also describes how tea was evaluated and where the best tea leaves were produced. Lu Yu also encouraged commoners to drink tea by including a section on what tea utensils could be omitted if one could not afford them. Lu Yu is known as the 'Sage of Tea' and the 'God of Tea' because of his profound influence on tea culture.

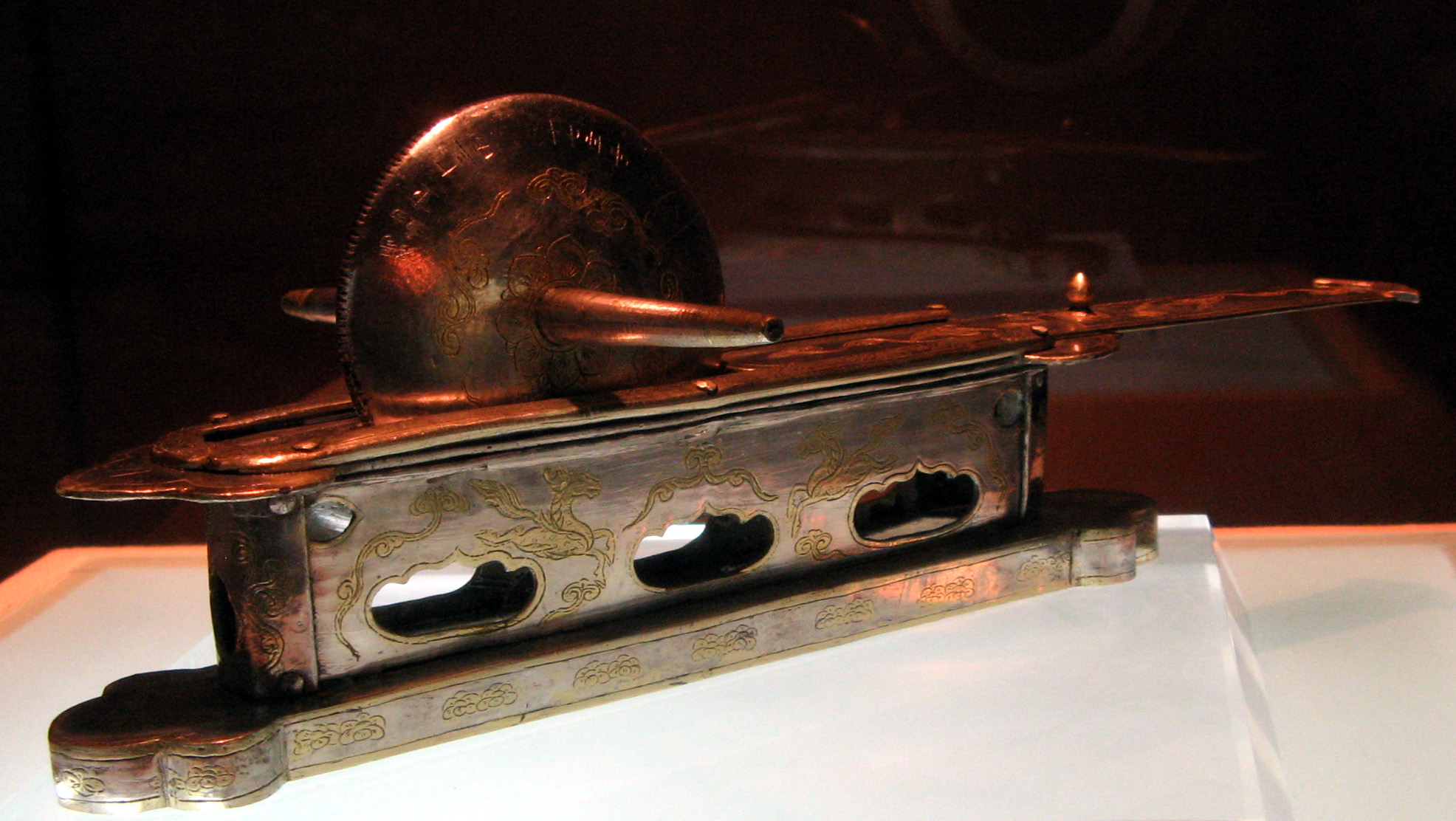
Tea Grinder from a Tang imperial tea set found at Famen temple

The Classic of Tea mentions how during Lu Yu's time, the whole plant was picked, including stems and branches and all leaves. This differs in how tea is picked in modern times (only a few leaves are picked at a time). After harvesting, tea was steamed, pounded in a mortar, placed in moulds and dried into tea cakes or bricks. The Classic of Tea method of preparing tea was by baking the tea cake over a fire, placing it in a paper sack to cool, grinding it up in a mortar, and boiling the tea in a cauldron with a pinch of salt. The tea would be served as an unfiltered thick soup, with all the leaves, stems and grounds in it. According to Lu Yu, the best tea bowls in his time was the celadon Yue ware from the Yue kilns of Zhejiang. He writes that tea should be taken in small sips.

The Classic of Tea also tied drinking tea to spiritual matters, the arts, and philosophy. An important value that Lu Yu's Classic emphasized was jiǎn (儉; "frugality"), a kind of rustic simplicity. The Classic soon became an appealing text for the Chinese elites. who soon embraced tea culture as an important and civilized element of Chinese culture. Thus, Lu Yu's classic helped transform an enjoyable beverage into an art that became central to Chinese culture.

Lu Yu's classic inspired and was followed by other works on tea culture. Some texts, like Zhang Youxin's A Record of Water for Decocting Tea, focused on specific topics, like water for tea making. Zhang lists the twenty best water sources for tea, and he also writes "if you make tea with water from the place where it is cultivated, it will invariably be excellent, because the water and the land are suited to each other. If you go away to another place, the water will contribute half, while skill in preparation and clean vessels will complete the effect."

=== Song dynasty (960–1279) ===
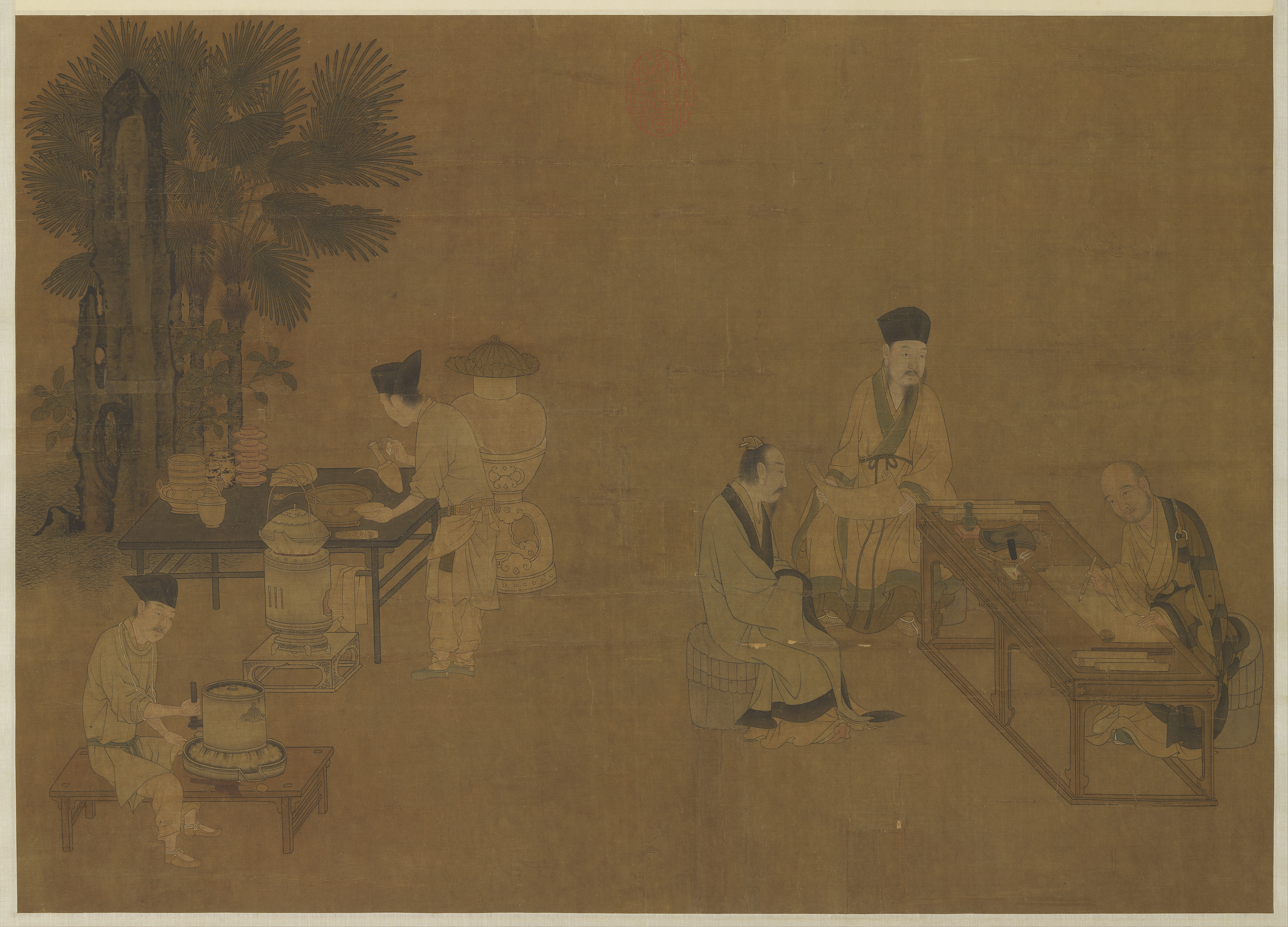
Song dynasty tea preparation, painted by Liu Songnian.

The tea culture flourished during the Song dynasty, where it was consumed by the elite during social gatherings where Chinese arts and poetry were appreciated and discussed. Detailed standards also emerged for judging the color, aroma, and taste of tea. Tea art, the tea gatherings, and tea houses continued to increase in popularity. Knowledge of proper tea making was considered a gentlemanly pursuit, along with other skills like calligraphy, painting, and poetry.

China's monopoly on tea allowed them to use it as a powerful economic and diplomatic tool. The Song established "Tea and Horse Offices" (茶马司; chamasi) to oversee the trading of tea for horses along the Tea Horse Road with Tibet. They required large numbers of warhorses to fight battles with invading northern nomadic Liao, Jin, and Xixia. When disputes arose, the dynastic government would threaten to cut off the tea trade and close off the 'Tea and Horse offices'. The traditional tea culture with the elite and scholars became more complex and tea culture continued to spread to the masses. Regional variations of tea culture formed throughout China. Different types of teahouses also emerged, including teahouses for music, for socializing and conversation, and for prostitution (which were called hua chafang, flower tea houses).

Tea cultivation moved from wild tea plants to established farming across numerous provinces, leading to tea being traded worldwide. 'Tribute tea' was the gifting of high-quality tea to the emperor to honor him. The Song tea economy developed into a large monopolistic government bureaucracy that collected tea taxes, fixed tea prices, sold vouchers which allowed merchants to sell tea, managed tea cultivation on rural farms, and transported tribute tea to the royal court.

The most expensive and finest tea in the Song was la cha ("wax tea"), which was made from the highest grade leaves which were washed, steamed, pressed, ground up, and roasted in moulds to make tea cakes or bricks. The cakes were often covered with different kinds of precious oils, spices and were sealed with aromatic oinments, like Borneo camphor, to create all sorts of highly fragrant teas which went by names like "Dragon Brain Fragrant Tea". There were also many different types of popular teawares during the Song, including those made in the Five Great Kilns. Northern Celadon and southern Longquan celadon were the most popular types of celadon wares. Cizhou ware remained important, and other new types of white porcelain also became popular for teaware, like Ding ware and Qingbai ware.

Emperor Huizong of Song (reigned 1100–1126) was a great tea enthusiast. He wrote the Grand Treatise on Tea (大觀茶論), which is perhaps the second greatest work on tea in China after the Classic of Tea. Huizhong was a fan of unperfumed white tea that had not been covered in aromatics. His preferences influenced the elites and from this time on, perfumed teas became less popular. Tea literature was prolific at this time. Another important work was Record of Tea by Cai Xiang. The scholar-officials who oversaw the tea economy often wrote poetry on tea. One poem by Southern Song tea expert Xiong Fan reads, "'Throngs tussle, trampling new moss. I turn my head toward first blush over the dragon's field. A warden beating a gong to urge haste, they carry baskets of tea down the mountain. When picking tea, one is not allowed to see the sunrise.'"

Tea was also widely used in Buddhist temples and monasteries during Buddhist rituals as offerings to the Buddhas. There were even specific rituals which focused on tea, like the one described in the Pure Rules of Baizhang (Bǎizhàng qīngguī), which continues to be practiced in some Japanese Rinzai Zen temples today. In the 12th century, a Japanese Zen monk called Eisai (c. 1141–1215, Ch: Yosai) brought tea from China to Japan, planted it, and wrote the first Japanese book on tea (喫茶養生記, Treatise on Drinking Tea for Health) which drew on Lu Yu's Classic and argued tea promoted longevity and spiritual harmony. Eisai also introduced rituals for offering tea to the Buddha and to the Shinto deities. This was the beginning of tea cultivation and tea culture in Japan.

Tea was also a major export good through the Silk Road on land and Maritime Silk Road. During this time, Persian and Arab encountered tea for the first time. Chinese tea culture is described by Al-Biruni (c. 11th century) in his Book on Pharmacy and Materia Medica.

==== Song era tea making ====
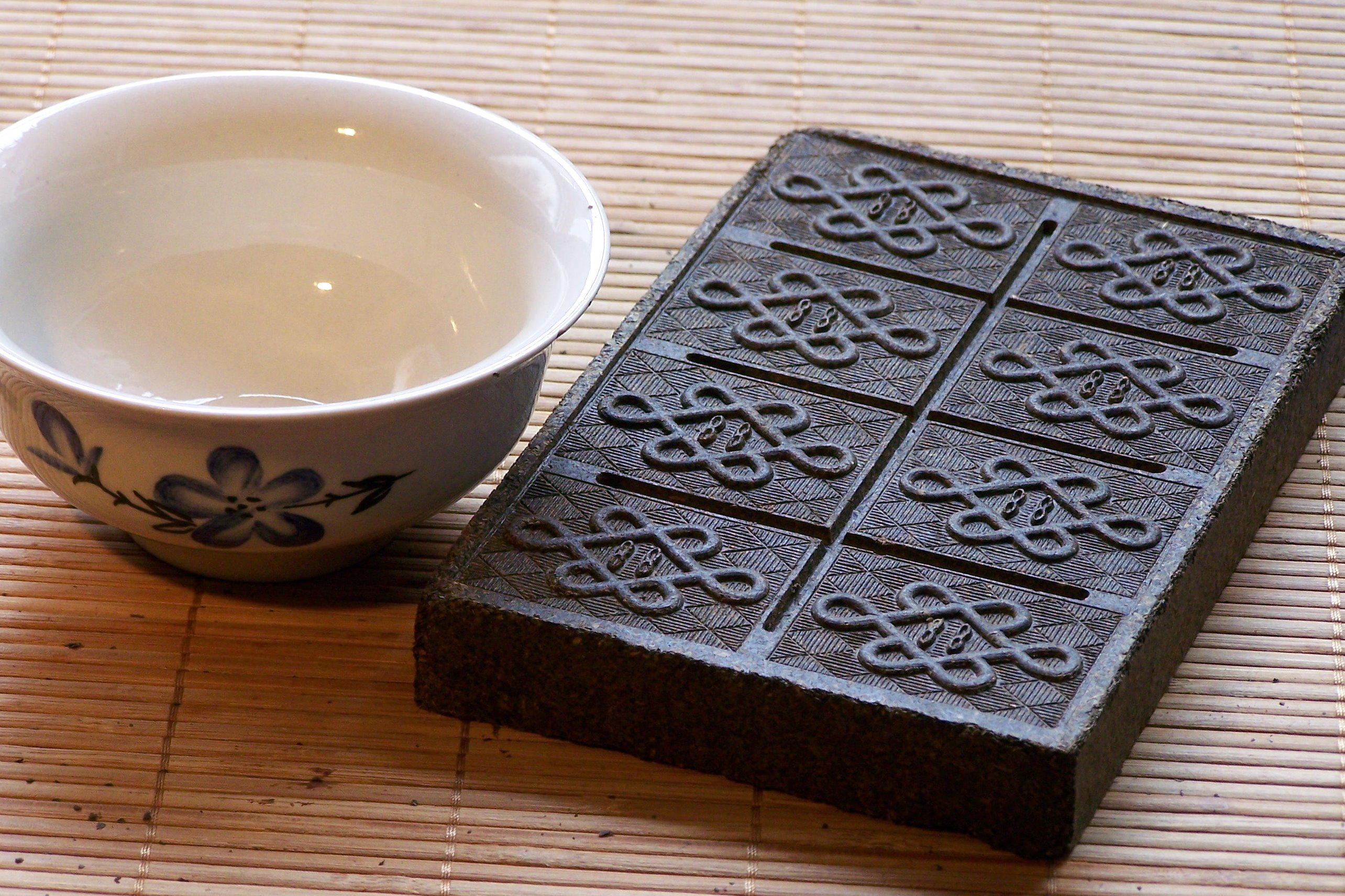
Modern Brick tea

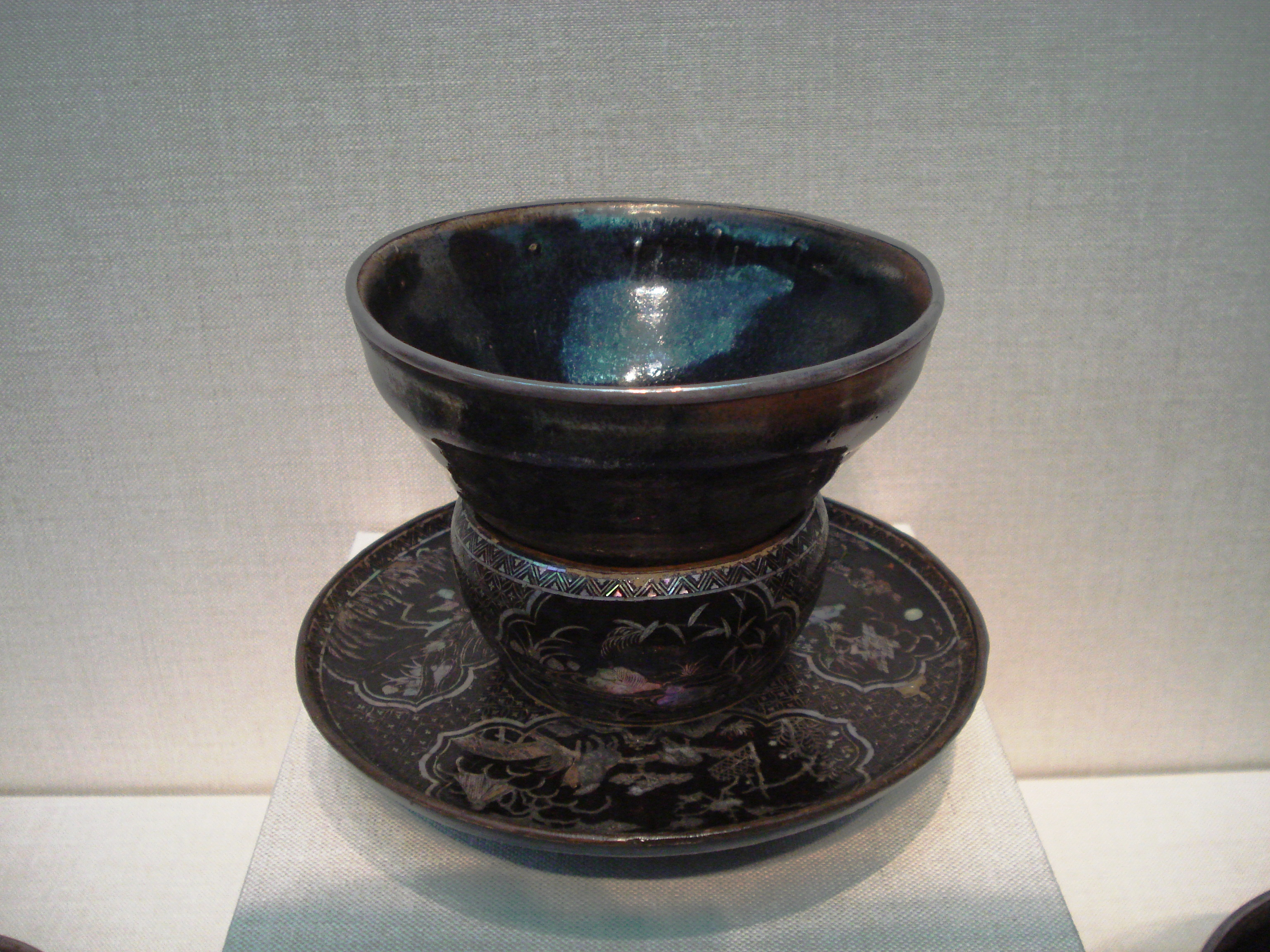
Song Dynasty tea bowl on a Ming Dynasty stand

Tea served during the Song was often made from tea bricks or cakes made of partially dried or thoroughly dried and ground tea leaves pressed into bricks (a process similar to modern Pu-erh). In the Song era, serving the tea from tea bricks or cakes required the following steps:

- Water was boiled in a porcelain ewer (pitcher).
- Toasting: Tea bricks are usually first toasted over a fire to destroy any mould or insects that may have burrowed into the bricks during storage.
- Grinding: The tea brick was crushed in a bag (silk if one could afford it) and ground to a fine powder which was placed in a bowl
- Whisking: The powdered tea was mixed with hot water and beaten with a bamboo whisk called Chaxian (茶筅) or in Japan called Chasen before serving.

This tea preparing method called Dian cha (點茶).

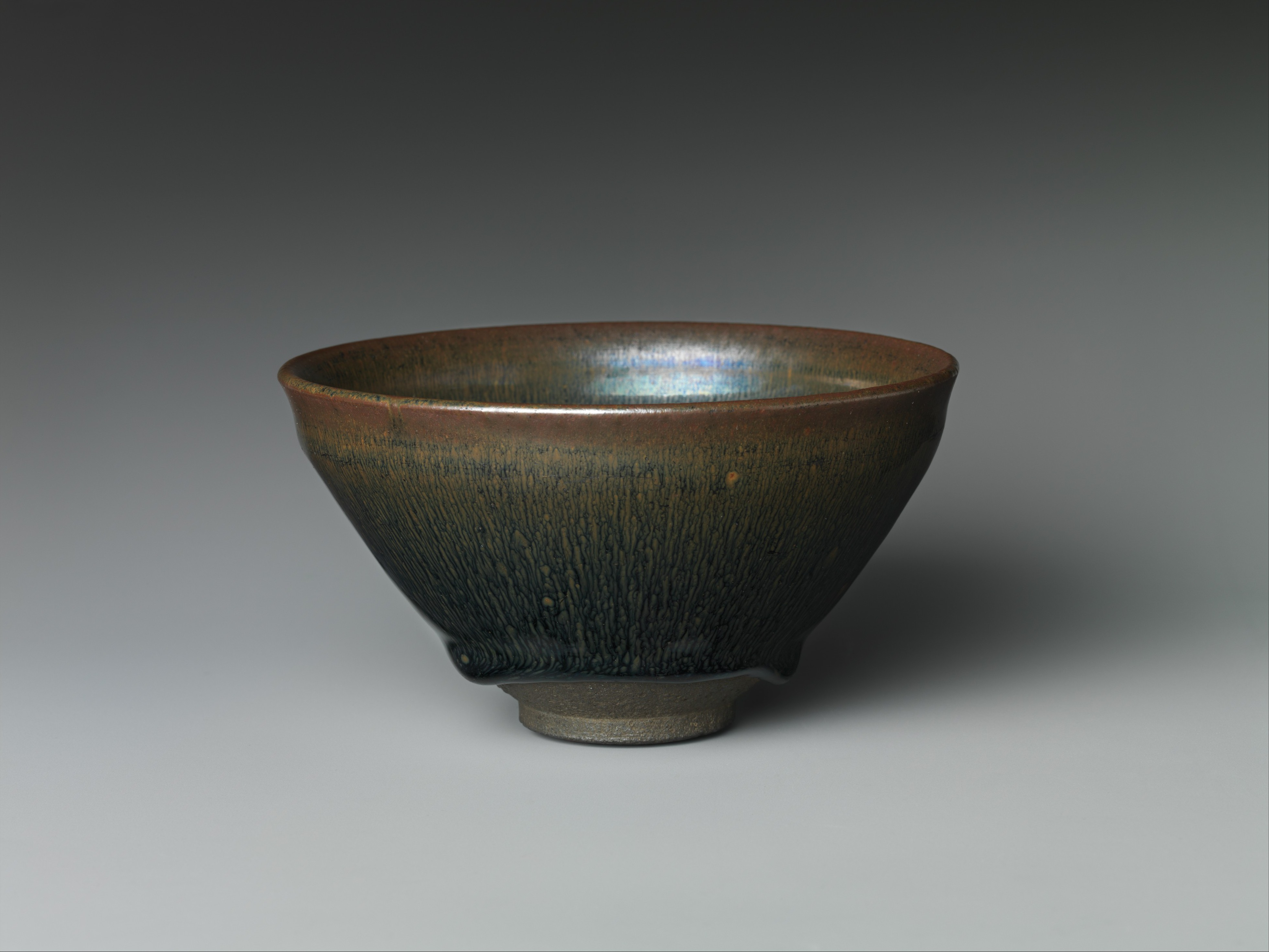
Jian tea bowl with "hare's fur" glaze, southern Song, 12th century.

The froth, colour and patterns formed by the whisked tea were aesthetically important for the elites and whisking was considered a gentleman's skill. The whisked frothy teas led to the rise in popularity of dark patterned bowls in which the texture of the thick whisked tea could be more easily judged, as the white froth contrasted more easily with dark bowls.

The best of these bowls were the Jian ware made in the Jianzhou kilns, glazed in patterns with names like oil spot, partridge feather, hare's fur, and tortoise shell. These styles are still highly valued today. The patterned holding bowl and tea mixture were often lauded in the period's poetry, with phrases such as "partridge in swirling clouds" or "snow on Hare's fur." A popular pastime was to use various implements like spoons to create art on the tea froth which would depict things like birds, fish, flowers and plants.

The Chinese practice of preparing powdered tea was brought to Japan by Buddhist monks and can still be seen in the Japanese tea ceremony, or Chadō which uses finely powdered matcha.

While cake tea (whether fancy or coarse cakes) was popular with many groups, including monks and elites, various other methods of tea making were also used by the commoners. Adding honey to tea was one popular tea making method. In the later Southern Song era (1127–1279) wax tea and whisked tea methods had become less popular among the commoners and loose-leaf green tea had become the most popular type of tea with commoners, since it was cheaper to make and easier to prepare.

==== Tea competitions ====
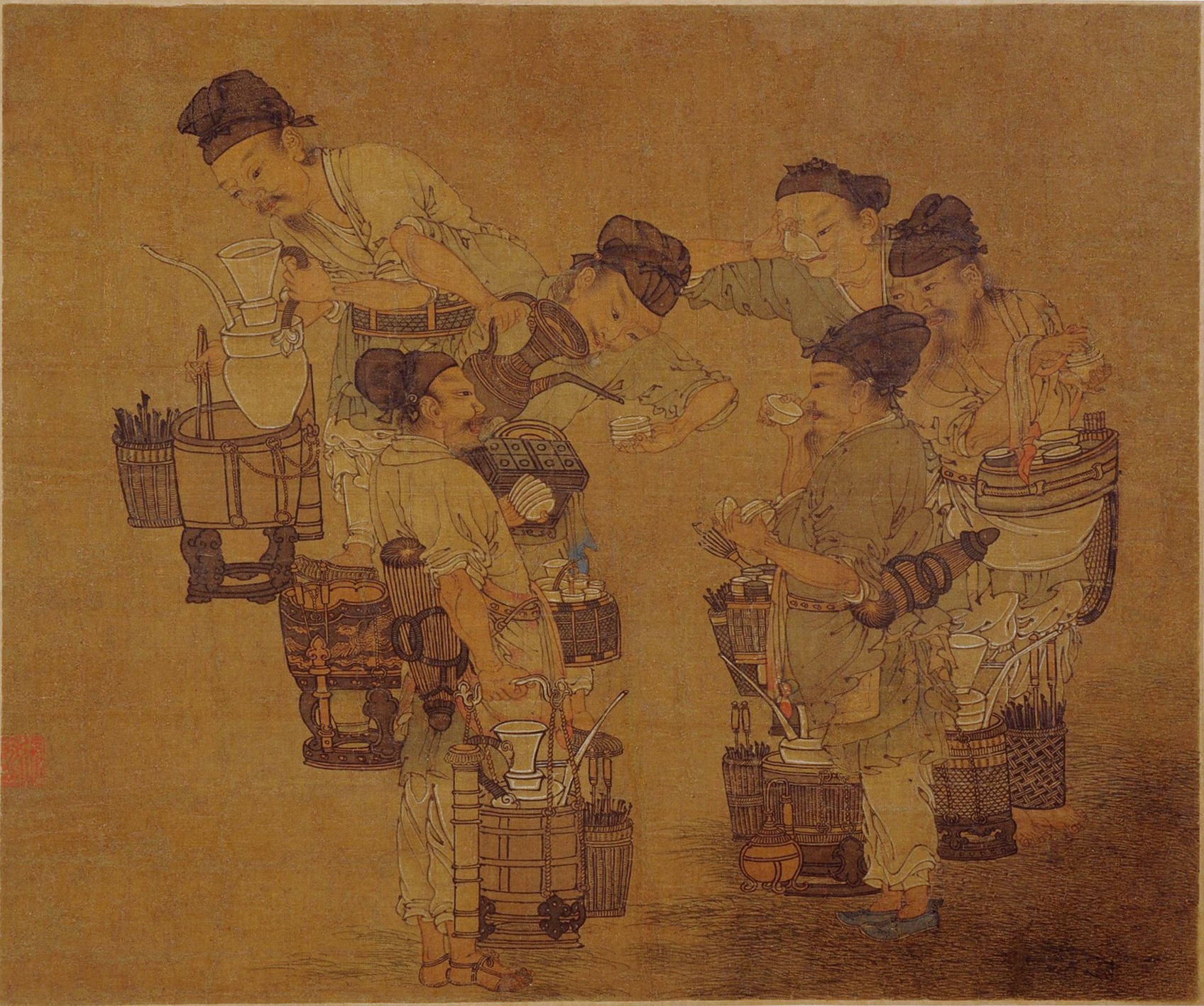
Song dynasty painting showing commoners engaged in tea competition

Tea competitions developed among the people of Jianzhou in the Tang and became very popular in the Song. These competitions were usually focused on producing the thickest or most aesthetically pleasing tea broth or foam (tanghua) through whisking as well as on tea art and tea tasting. These games became known as 'fighting tea' (doucha) or 'tea war' (mingzhan). Soon the competitions were held at the imperial palace and among elites and scholars, where it became a refined form of entertainment, like modern wine tastings. Emperor Song Huizeng was a tea war enthusiast. The quality of tea, tools used, and the water condition were of great importance in winning a tea competition.

Tea competitions involved the entire process of tea preparation, boiling water, grinding tea, tasting, etc. The battle might focus on creating a foam on the tea or on tasting the tea. According to Skill in tea arts became a sign of manly refinement for Song men. Displaying one's manhood was important during this time, and tea fighting was one way for men to prove themselves. During the Tang and Song dynasties, showing elite manhood was tied to their refined values. It was associated with high cultural pursuits, so winning the tea competition allowed the winner to display their successful masculine image.

=== Ming era ===
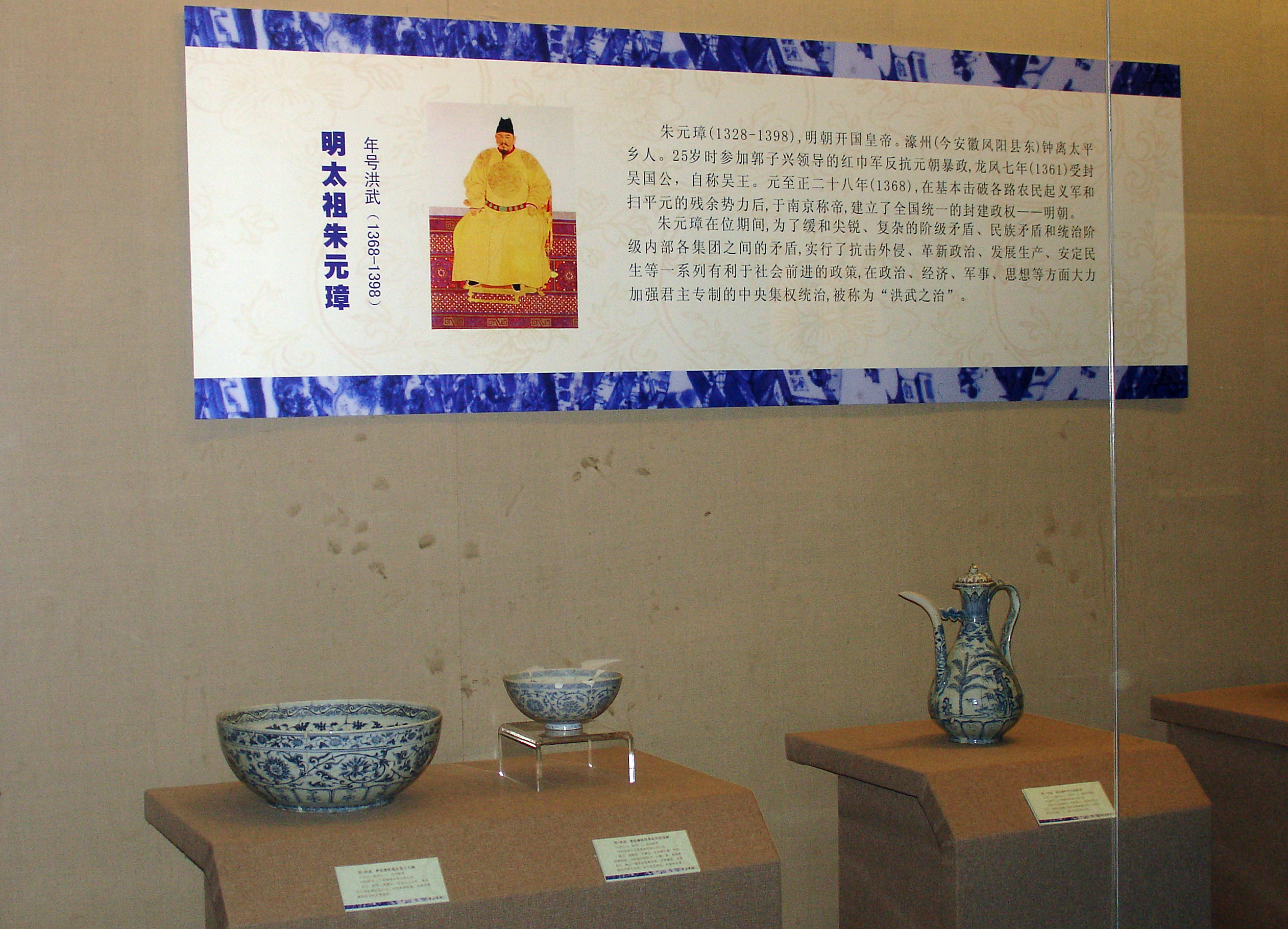
Ming imperial porcelain

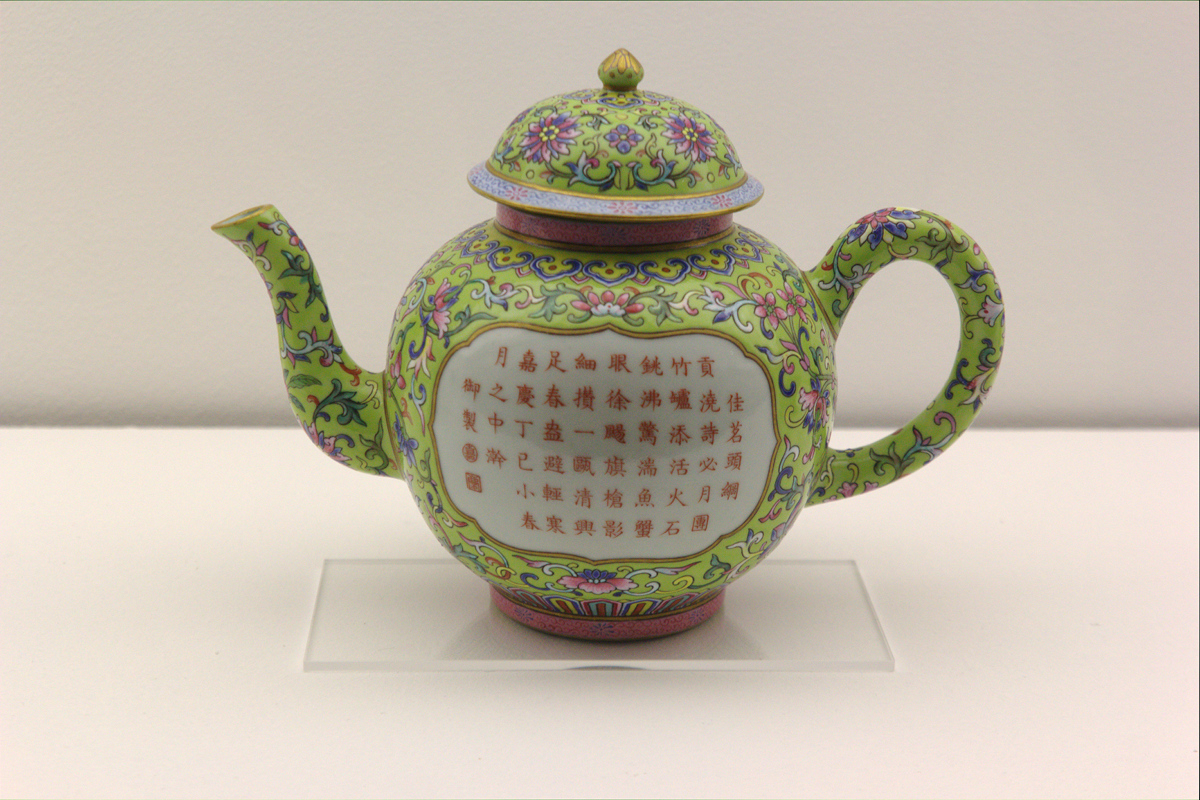
Ming era porcelain teapot with enamel overglaze.

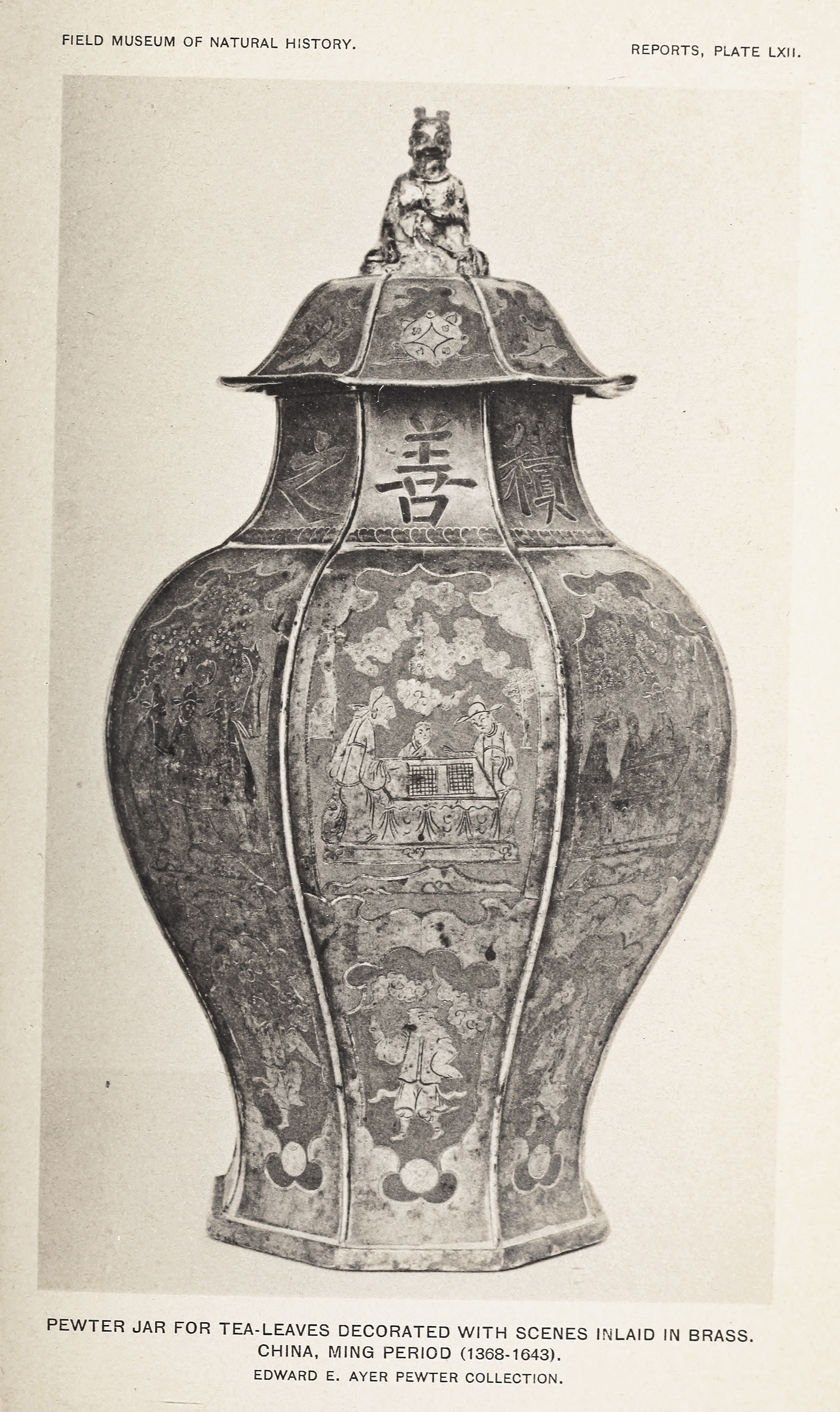
Ming Pewter Jar for tea leaves decorated with scenes inlaid with brass.

In 1391, the Hongwu Emperor (1368–1398), the founder of the Ming dynasty, decreed that tributes of tea to the court were to be changed from the "wax tea" cake form to loose-leaf tea. The emperor's explanation for the change found in his decree, called "Abolishing Tea Cakes and Switching to Tribute Leaf Tea," was that wax tea cake making was "overtaxing the people's strength." The emperor had also grown up as a poor tenant farmer and had also spent some time as a Buddhist monk. He thus preferred the simpler and less time-consuming way of making loose leaf teas than the more expensive and ostentatious whisked tea style, which was also much more difficult and expensive to process. His imperial decree quickly transformed the tea-drinking habits of the Chinese upper classes, who soon took to drinking loose leaf tea. Cake tea was further criticized by the emperor's son, Zhu Quan, who was a connoisseur of tea. Zhu's Tea Manual (茶谱; Chá Pǔ) argued that cake tea / wax tea ruined the true flavor of tea which could only be experienced by brewing pure tea leaf in its natural form. He also promoted a refined style of taking tea which required six pure elements: quiet hills, clear spring water, pure tea, relaxed heart, clean teaware and the company of virtuous people.

Ming style loose leaf tea was also introduced to Japan in the 17th century by figures like the Chinese Buddhist monk Ingen (Ch: Yinyuan), the founder of the Ōbaku school of Zen. This tea tradition, popularized by later figures like Baisao, would evolve into the style now known as senchadō.

==== New teaware ====
The arrival of the new method for preparing elite tea also required the adoption of new vessels and tools, such as:

- The tea pot or tea brewing bowl was needed so that the tea leaves could be steeped separately from the drinking vessel for an infusion of proper concentration.
- Tea caddies and containers also became necessary to preserve freshness, flavor and aroma.
- Smaller drinking cups or bowls, in lighter colors and often decorated with designs. These cups were better suited to the lighter color of the steeped tea liquor and aided in smelling the aroma of fresh tea.
- Smaller tools like spoons for tea leaves and strainers to keep leaves out of one's cup when pouring tea.

Teawares made with a special kind of purple clay (zisha) from Yixing went on to develop during this period, now known as Yixing zisha teapots. Purple clay's structure was porous and retained heat well. The porousness of the clay also meant that it would take on the taste of tea over time (a process known as "seasoning"), which would affect the taste of any tea brewed in the pot. Simplicity and rusticity dominated the idea of purple clay teawares which soon became quite popular. The first true teapot developed during the 16th century, when monks from the Jinsha Temple (Golden Sand Temple) near Yixing began making unglazed teapots from the local clay. Their use was popularized by Gong Chun, who became a servant in the house of Yixing tea master Wu Lun (1440–1522).

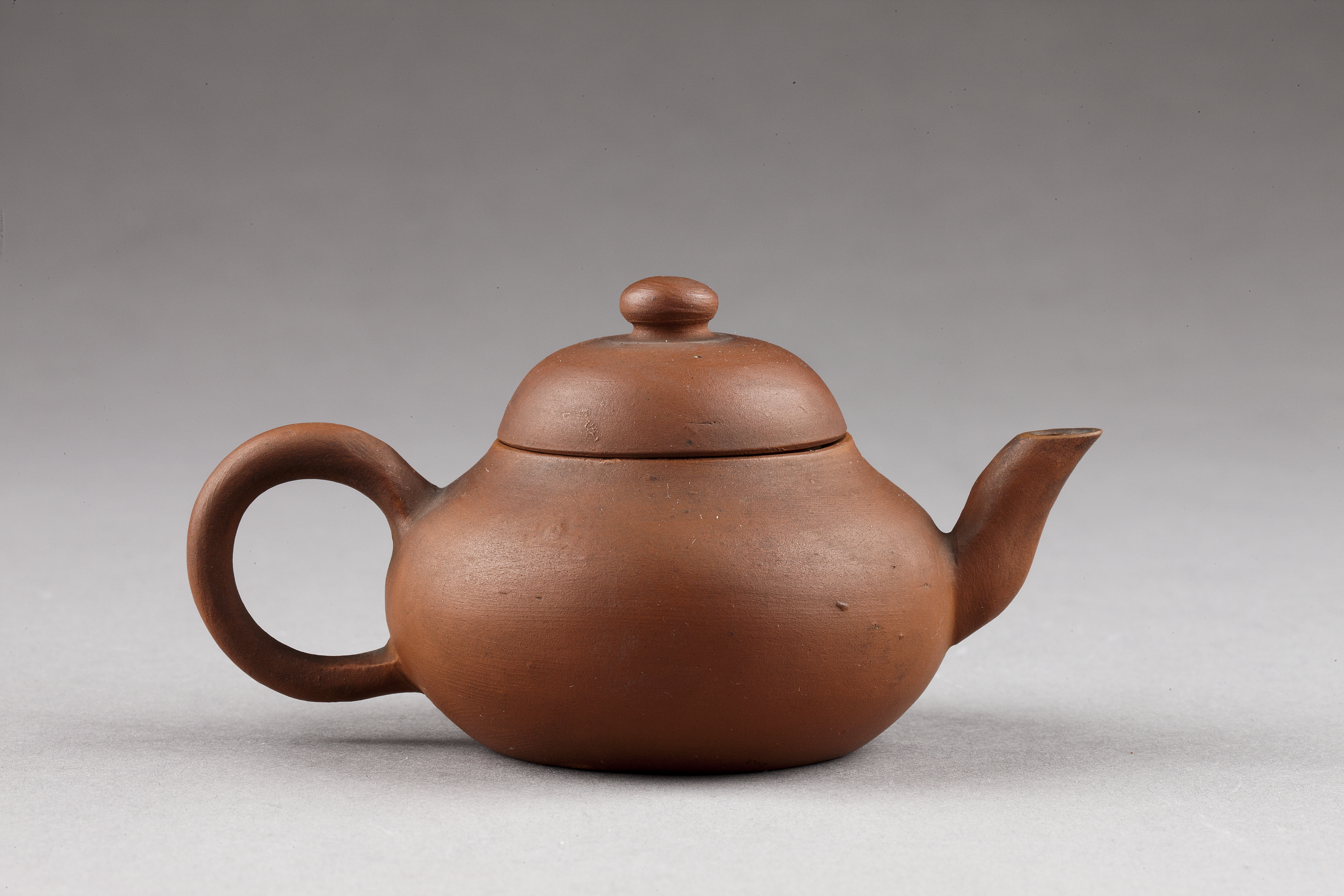
Yixing clay teapot made by Hui Mengchen 惠孟臣, late Ming-early Qing.

New types of porcelain teawares also became popular during the Ming, such as Jingdezhen porcelain, which was popular in the imperial court and widely patronized by the emperor. The late Ming dynasty also saw a transition towards a market economy that exported porcelain worldwide at scale. During the reign of the Wanli Emperor (1572–1620), the kilns at Jingdezhen became the main production centre for large-scale porcelain exports to Europe, many of which were teaware pieces or sets that were valued by the upper classes in Europe.

==== Tea literature ====
During the Ming, teaware and tea utensils became important luxury goods for the elites and upwardly mobile classes. There was also a thriving publishing industry writing books on the appropriate elite etiquette surrounding elegant and refined pursuits such as tea. One of the most of important of these works which discusses Ming era tea culture was Eight Discourses on the Art of Living (Zun Sheng Ba Jian) by Gao Lian (late 16th century), a work that in turn heavily influenced the widely popular "Treatise on Superfluous Things" (Zhang wu zhi) of Wen Zhenheng (1585–1645). Another one of these works, the Chashu (茶疏; "Treatise on Tea") by Xu Cishui 許次紓 (1597), explains how loose leaf tea was brewed in the Ming era:

The teapot should be small; it should not be too big. If it is small, the fragrance remains concentrated; if it is big, it will easily get dispersed. One containing half a sheng [half litre, 500ml] is of the appropriate size. If it is for personal use, the smaller the better. For a half sheng of water, measure five fen [a little under 2 grams] of tea...First hold the tea leaves in your hand. When the water is ready, cast them in the pot, and immediately pour the hot water on the tea. Place the lid on the pot and wait for the time of three breaths. Then pour out all the tea into a large bowl, and pour it again into the pot. This is to stir the fragrance and to prevent the colour from stagnating. Wait for the time of another three breaths to calm its levity. Then pour it out and serve it to the guests...A pot of tea can serve only two rounds (xun). The first round is fresh and delicious, the second is sweet and mellow, the third one is no more desirable. For this reason it is desirable that the pot is small. If it is small it will finish serving two rounds.

The Ming elite drank tea in a more subdued fashion than their Song counterparts. They preferred peace and quietude in the countryside. Drinking tea was something for small gatherings or a solitary pursuit. This aesthetic is captured in the works of famous Ming artists like the painter Tang Yin and the writer and tea master Lu Shusheng.

==== Developments in tea processing ====
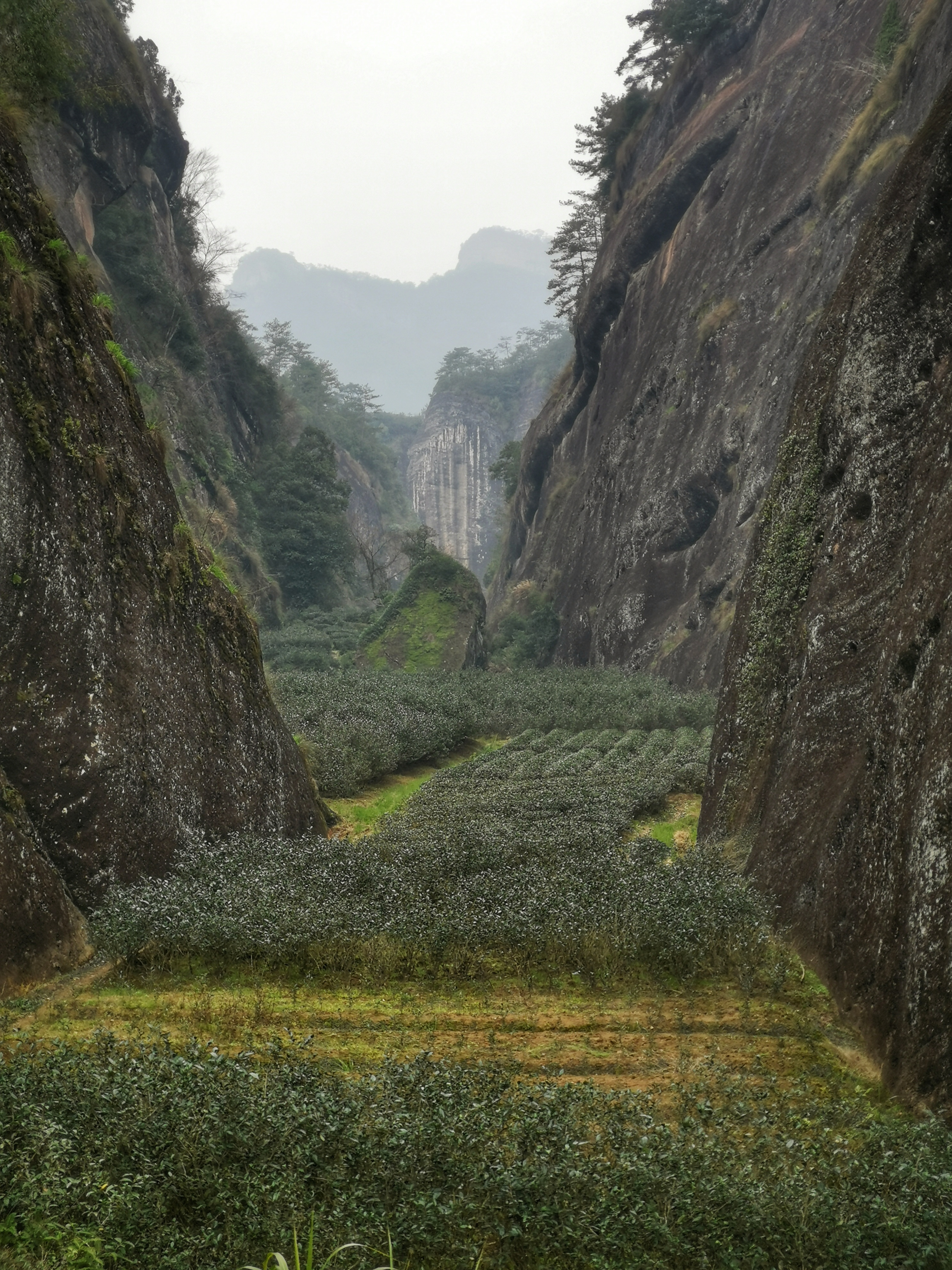
Tea bushes growing in the Wuyi Mountains

One new development of tea processing during the Ming was discovered by Buddhist monks on Anhui's Songluo Mountain, who began to roast tea leaves in a dry wok fueled by charcoal to stop the oxidation process (a process called fixing). Before this invention, tea leaves were "fixed" by being steamed. The monks preferred the fragrance and flavor of this lightly roasted tea and soon this method became popular. The practice, named "Songluo method", was described in Wen Long's Tea Commentary (c. 1630). "Songluo tea" is still used today as a name for traditionally made charcoal roasted teas.

In the 16th century, monks from Songluo were brought to the Wuyi Mountains in Fujian to teach their new method to Wuyi tea makers. Over the following decades, the monks at Wuyi learned that leaving leaves to wither in the sun and slightly bruising them through pressing and tossing them made the leaves brown, changing their flavor and fragrance. This new type of Wuyi tea was called oolong ("black dragon") tea, the most famous of which were the Four Great Tea Cultivars. In northern Guangdong, this new type of tea was brewed in high amounts in small pots and served in small cups, an innovation that began in Chaozhou. This way of brewing tea is the ancestor of the modern gongfu tea method.

It was this southern type of oxidized oolong tea that Europeans first encountered when they traded with the Chinese in Guangzhou ("Canton"). As European markets demanded more of it, Chinese tea makers continued to produce tea that was more and more oxidized, a process that culminated in the development of black tea ("red tea" in China). Other types of teas also became popular during this time, like white tea and yellow tea.

Another development during the Ming was the discovery of fermented tea (dark tea). The discovery of tea fermentation was initially an accident produced by the length of time it took to transport tea to Tibet through the Tea Horse road. The Tibetans grew accustomed to this type of aged tea, which they eventually came to prefer due to its strong taste that paired well with butter and milk. In the early 16th century, this process was mastered by the tea-makers of Anhua county, Hunan. They discovered how to replicate this fermentation by piling leaves together in a hot and humid room for some time, which led to the growth of microorganisms. This type of tea was initially only processed to sell to Tibetans and northern nomadic tribes.

=== Tea in the Qing Dynasty ===
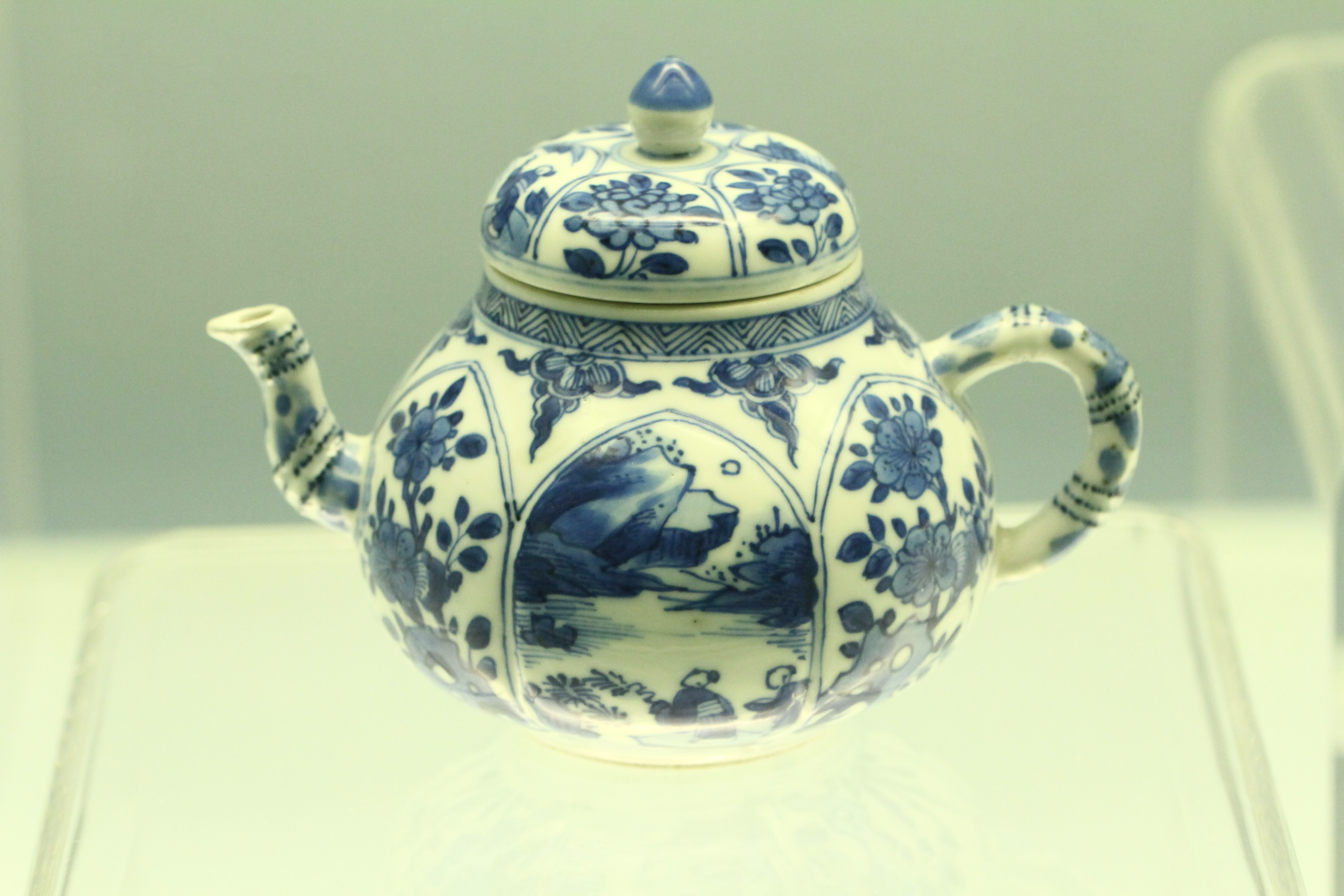
Lobed Jingdezhen porcelain teapot, Kangxi Reign (1662–1722). Jingdezhen remained a major center for the production of teawares in the Qing.

The Qing dynasty (1644–1912) saw the rise in popularity of many different types of tea. By the mid-18th century, new forms of tea, including white, black and oolongs were well known and were being sold internationally, having become major cash crop for China. Evidence for Many of the famous modern styles of tea also began to be produced during the Qing and exported. For example, White Silver Needle, White Peony tea and Biluochun (Green Snail Spring) date to the Qing. 18th century Wuyi mountain oolongs can be found in sources like Recipes from the Garden of Contentment by the famous gastronome Yuan Mei (1716–1797) who also described the local tea customs. Apart from promoted milk tea (a traditional Manchu drink), the Qing court also popularized scented teas, such as jasmine tea and teas scented with cloranthus, cassia, honeysuckle, and rose.

There were many types of teahouses (chaguan) in Beijing and other Chinese cities of the Qing empire, including large boisterous teahouses (dachaguan), teahouses which also served food and alcohol (erhunpu), teahouses only for tea and held tea appreciation parties (chaniaohui), teahouses for chess playing (qichaguan), scenic countryside teahouses (yechaguan), and teahouses where storytellers would recount Chinese classics like Romance of the Three Kingdoms (shuchaguan).

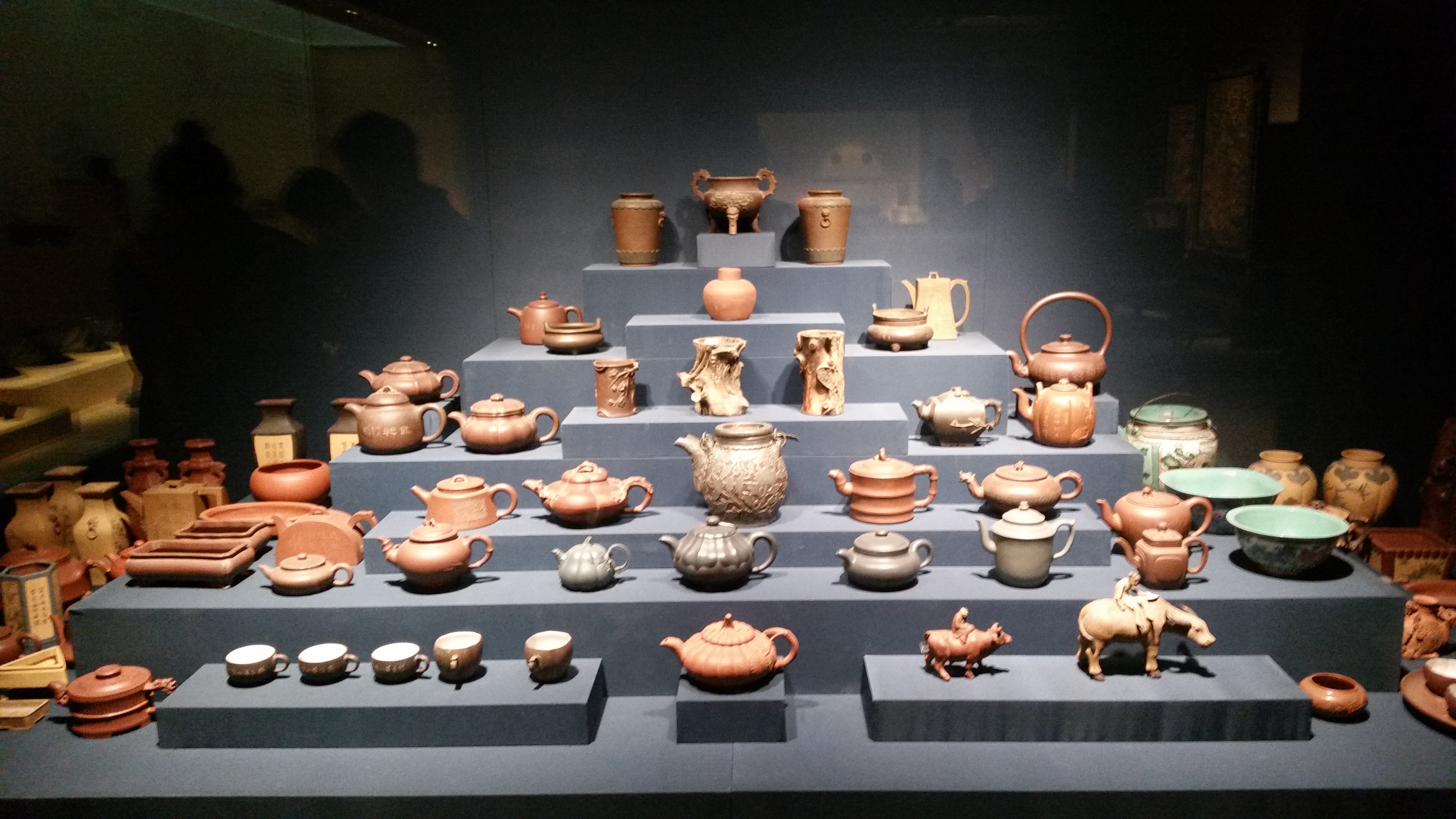
Qing teawares, Nanjing Museum

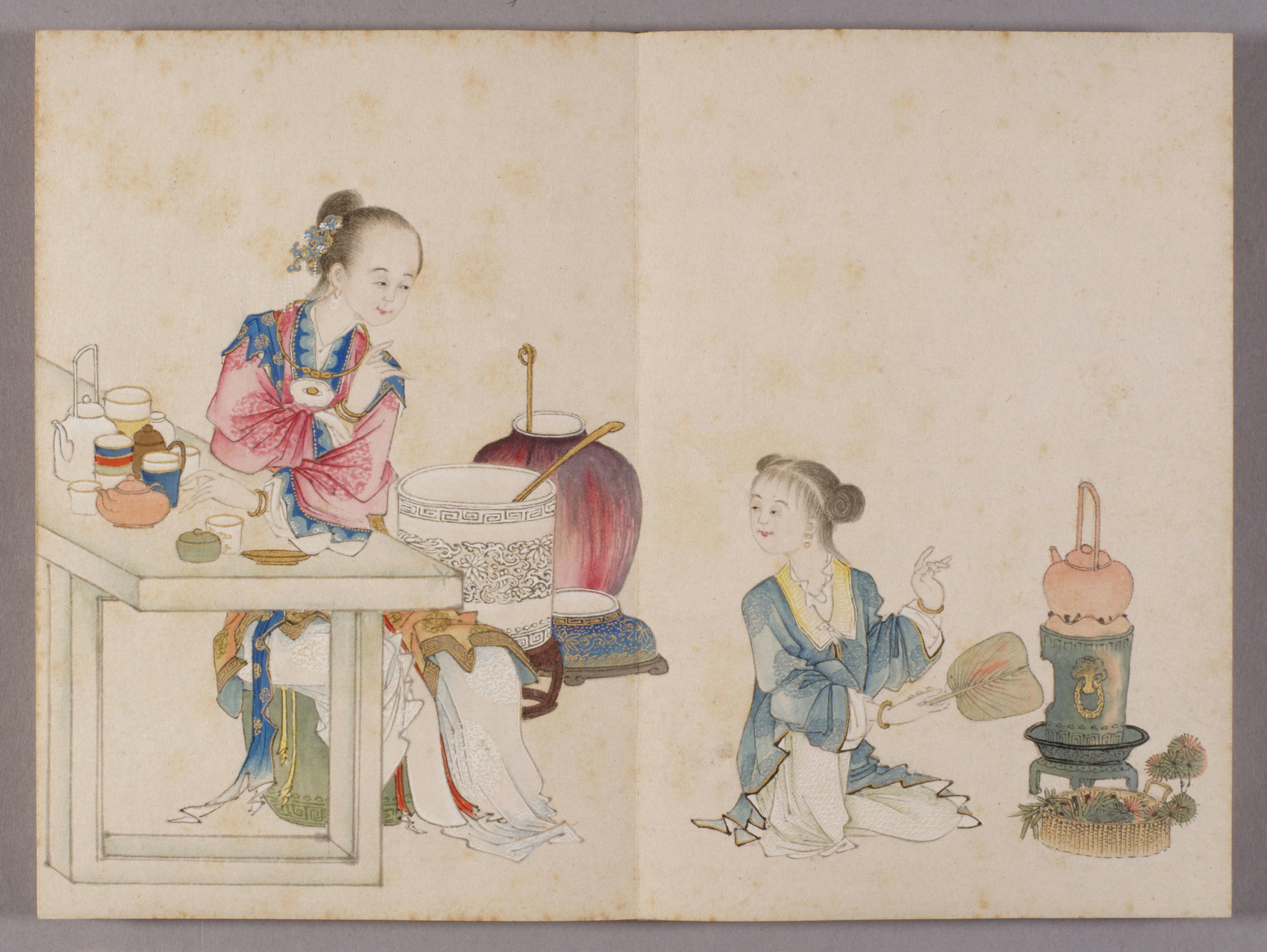
Refined ladies tasting tea by Yu Lan (1742–1809)

During the 19th century, Chinese tea and teawares were major commodities exported by the Qing around the world. Their popularity exploded in European nations, especially in Great Britain and Russia, who developed their own distinct tea cultures under the influence of Chinese tea. This made many Chinese elites rich, but had unforeseen consequences. Initially, the trade between China and the British Empire during the Qing era favored the Chinese. Tea, and Chinese porcelains (especially teaware) were in high in demand for the British (along with Chinese silks), but the Chinese did not find British goods desirable and would only accept silver in payment for their goods. This created a trade imbalance for the British.

To reverse this situation, the British began smuggling opium into China, where they only accepted payments in silver as well. This created an endless cycle as Chinese citizens became addicted to opium, and the silver earned from opium sales would be used in turn by the British to pay for valuable Chinese goods, especially tea. The Qing state attempted to crack down on opium sales and this eventually led to the Opium Wars (1839 to 1842 and 1856 to 1860). Britain was victorious, and this allowed them to gain trading rights within China's borders as well as other concessions.

=== 20th century ===
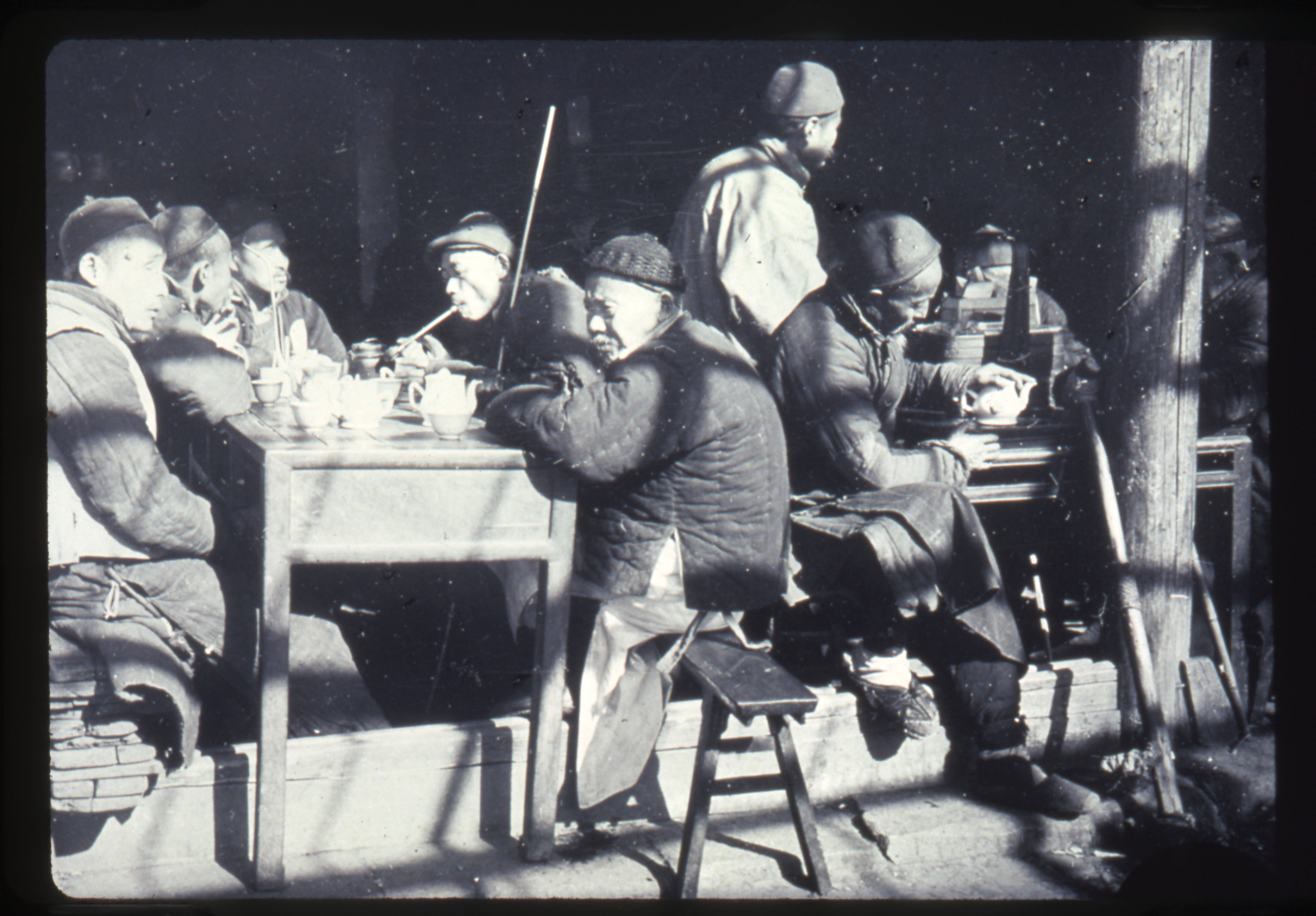
Chinese teashop in Changde, Hunan, ca.1900–1919.

During the late 19th century, the British Empire and the East India Company succeeded in growing and processing tea in the Indian regions of Darjeeling and Assam. They relied on an Indian strain of tea as well as Chinese tea specimens and seeds clandestinely extracted from China by the efforts of the Scottish botanist Robert Fortune. Several Chinese tea growers and processors were also paid to aid in this venture. This revolution in the global tea trade meant that Qing China lost its monopoly on tea as the crop began to be produced worldwide. By the last quarter of the nineteenth century, big western brands like Lyons, Liptons and Mazawattee dominated the western tea market. As such, by the beginning of the 20th century, Chinese tea was no longer the cash crop it had once been for the Qing empire.

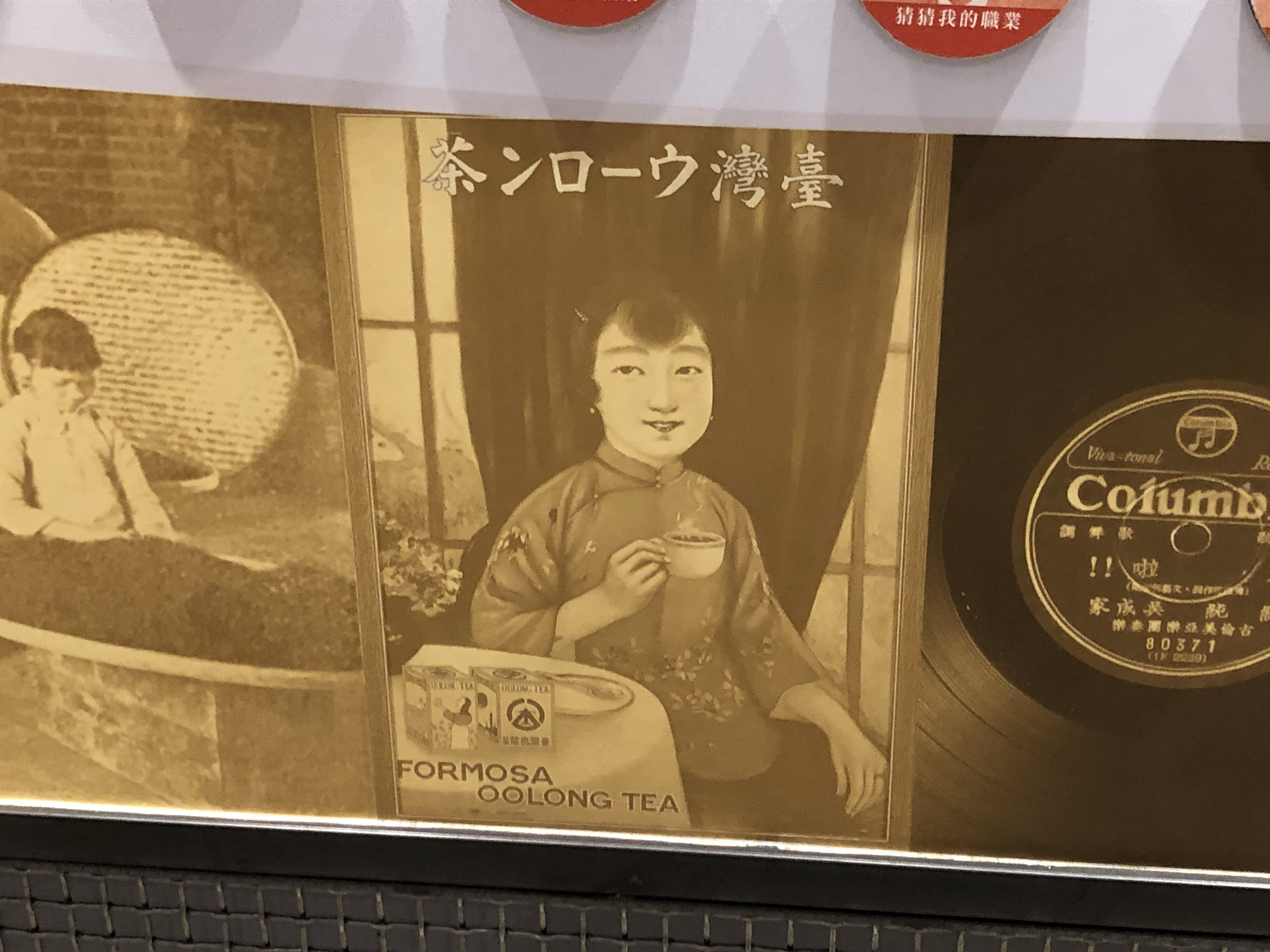
An ad for Taiwanese oolong ("Formosa oolong") from Japanese-era Taiwan

Taiwanese tea production developed extensively throughout the 20th and 21st centuries, and Taiwanese tea began to be exported internationally. Taiwan remained a small tea producer in the 19th century which focused on oolongs like Dong Ding tea. During the Japanese occupation, the Yuchi Black Tea Research Institute focused on hybridizing commercial tea varieties with Taiwan's indigenous varieties. The tea industry continued to expand into the late 20th century. After the Chinese Civil War, more Chinese migrated to Taiwan, bringing more Chinese tea culture and knowledge with them. Today, the Taiwan tea industry remains an important source of unique Chinese teas.

Under Chinese Communist Party chairman Mao Zedong's rule (1949–1976), China was mostly isolated from global markets. In the 1960s, under Mao's leadership, during the period known as the Great Leap Forward, tea production was significantly limited, and tea houses and shops were for the most part closed. The Cultural Revolution was also a period in which China's tea culture suffered. Under the leadership of Chinese leader Deng Xiaoping and the reform and opening up, China experienced double-digit economic growth and an era of increased personal freedoms, which spurred a rebirth of the tea industry and the traditional aspect of tea culture. According to Gary Sigley: "a sense of self and nation has coalesced around tea." China is once again the leading producer of tea in the world.

==== Development of the gongfucha tradition ====
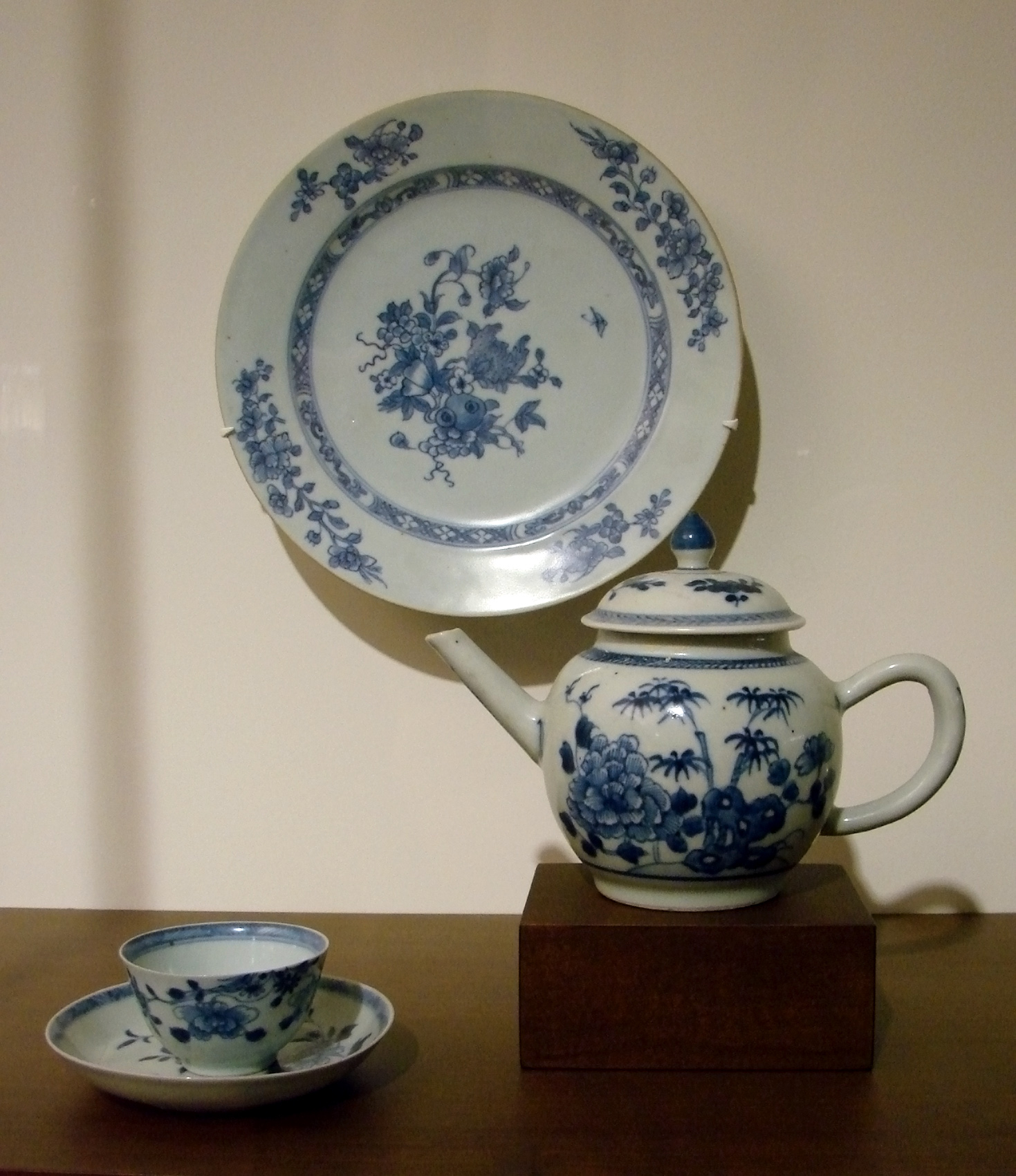
18th-century Chinese export porcelain teaware, Guimet Museum, Paris

During the 20th century, the modern gongfu style of tea drinking (sometimes called the "Chinese tea ceremony", although this phrasing is imprecise) exploded in popularity, becoming a common practice throughout the Sinophone world and beyond. The practice of making tea in small covered cups or pots, using many repeated infusions and drinking in small teacups was a local practice which developed during the 19th century in southern Chinese provinces like Fujian (in the Wuyi mountains region) and Guandong (Chaozhou area).

This method is described in Yuan Mei's Recipes from the Garden of Contentment, though it is clear that he sees it as a surprising new development which was unknown in north China. Northern Chinese during this time mostly drank tea made in large teapots or pots using large cups or glasses. These larger teawares resemble those which were exported to Europe (as Chinese export porcelain) and became widely imitated as western chinoiserie teawares. One of the first explanations and usage of the term gongfucha is found in an essay by Yu Jiao (1751–?), who served as a low ranking official in Guangdong and observed the practice.

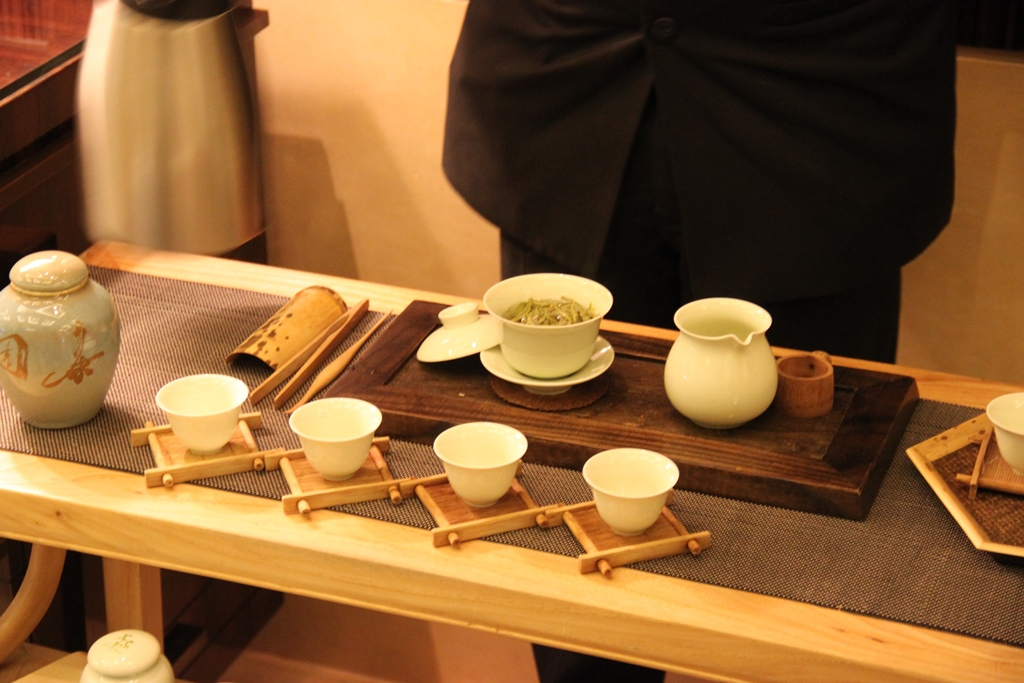
A modern gongfu style chaxi ("tea setting"), which is supposed to impart aesthetic elegance.

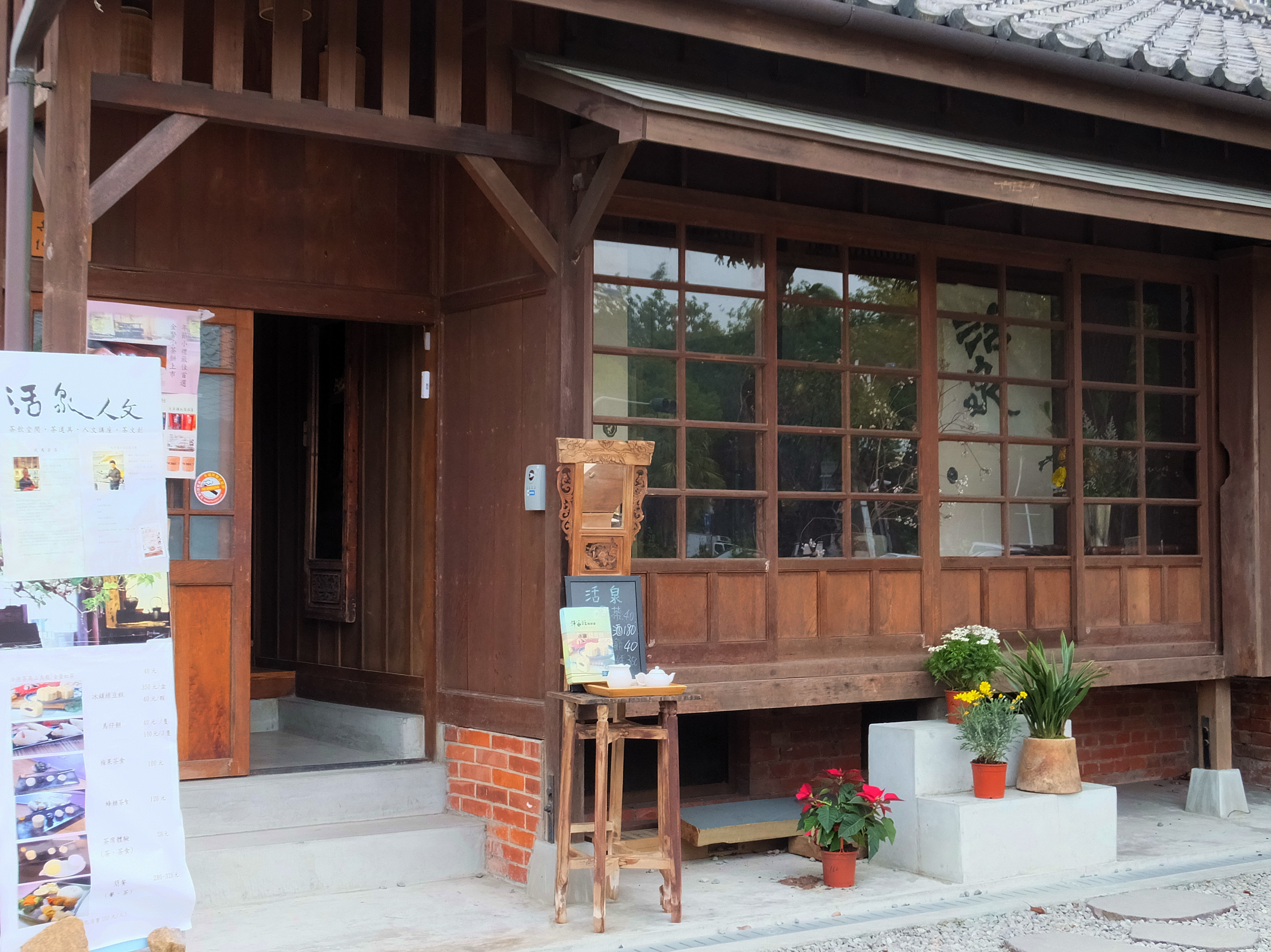
Huoquan Arts Teahouse, Chiayi, Taiwan

Modern Chinese tea pioneers, most of whom practiced their art in Taiwan, took this early southern gongfu custom of tea drinking as well as influences from the Japanese senchadō ("the way of steamed tea"), and developed it into the modern gongfucha / chadao culture that could compete with Japanese tea culture. This new "Chinese tea arts culture" (zhonghua chayi wenhua) was initially termed chayi ("tea arts") and was practiced in chayiguan ("tea art houses") which initially appeared in 1970s Taiwan and attempted to provide a cultured, traditional, and quiet setting specifically for tea drinking (as opposed to the older "teahouses" often associated with the lower classes, gambling, smoking, and prostitution).

Lawrence Zhang writes that Taiwanese tea house owners, conscious of themselves as pioneers in a new movement, claimed they "were recovering a lost tradition by means of emphasizing the pureness of tea drinking as an activity". Since earlier Chinese tea culture had mostly been utilitarian, these Taiwan based pioneers in tea culture sought to create an aesthetically refined Chinese tradition which could rival the Japanese chadō as an art form. In this, they borrowed from Japanese tea arts. According to Zhang, key parallels to senchadō in Chinese chayi include "the newfound interest in the spatial arrangement of teaware" (seen in the modern concept of the aesthetically pleasing chaxi, "tea setting") as well as the new emphasis on "control of the movement of the physical body in relation to these wares" (which became formalized into rules for how the tea brewer should move while making tea). Taiwanese tea scholars like Cai Rongzhang and Fan Zengping also began to write books on the art of tea. Influenced by the Japanese tradition which emphasized the aesthetics of harmony (wa), respect (kei), purity (sei), and tranquility (jaku), these authors emphasized what they considered to be the basic elements of tea culture, including beauty (mei), health (jian), cultivation (xing), and ethics (lun) for Cai; and harmony (he), thrift (jian), silence (jing), and cleanliness (jie) for Fan.

Taiwan also used chayi culture to position itself as the legitimate representative of Chinese culture and tradition. As such, the influences of Japanese tea culture on chayi were mostly hidden. Chinese authors on tea well into the modern era continued to present gongfucha style as being an ancient tradition instead of a newly invented one.

After the 1980s, this newly invented "Chinese tea art" (Zhonghua chayi) tradition was adopted throughout mainland China as a new national custom by a new class of wealthy urbanites seeking authentic Chinese culture. During this time, the Taiwanese Ten Ren Tea group entered the mainland Chinese market and became one of the most important players in China's tea market, promoting gongfucha throughout the mainland.

=== 21st century ===
Contemporary China and Taiwan currently offer various ways to experience cultural tea tourism, such as museums, tea trails, guided tours, tea houses, tea shops, tea markets, and tea tastings. There is one tea museum in mainland China and another in Taiwan. The National Tea Museum on the mainland can be found in Hangzhou in Zhejiang province, which maintains a variety of Chinese tea culture exhibits.

A revitalization of the traditional tea house throughout China has been spurred on by the introduction of new designer tea houses that cater to the young urban population. Chinese tea culture is now also being exported to western nations, with popular brands selling high end Chinese tea and gongfu teaware.

== Preparation and consumption ==
The different ways of brewing Chinese tea depend on variables like the formality of the occasion, the means of the people preparing it, the local and regional culture, personal preference, and the kind of tea being brewed. For example, green teas are more delicate than oolong teas or black teas; therefore, green tea should be brewed with cooler water to avoid bitterness.

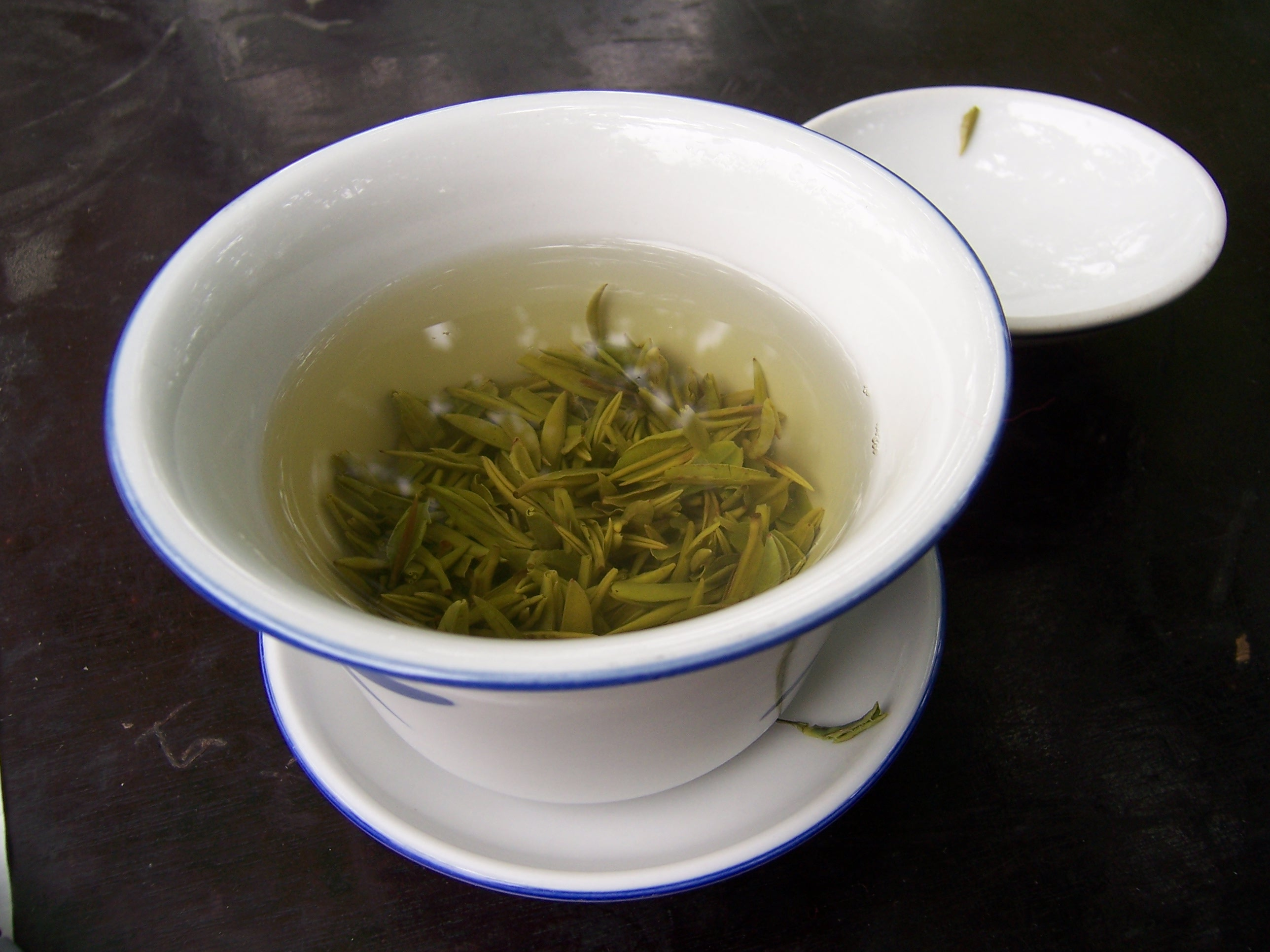
Simple tea in a bowl brewing

The simplest and most informal method of brewing and drinking tea is to add the leaves to a bowl or cup containing hot water. One drinks directly from the very cup used for brewing, without straining or removing the leaves. Most of the leaves will often sink down to the bottom of the bowl and the rest can be avoided, eaten, drunk or pushed away. This method of drinking tea is very common in China and is commonly found in informal settings, households, workplaces and restaurants.

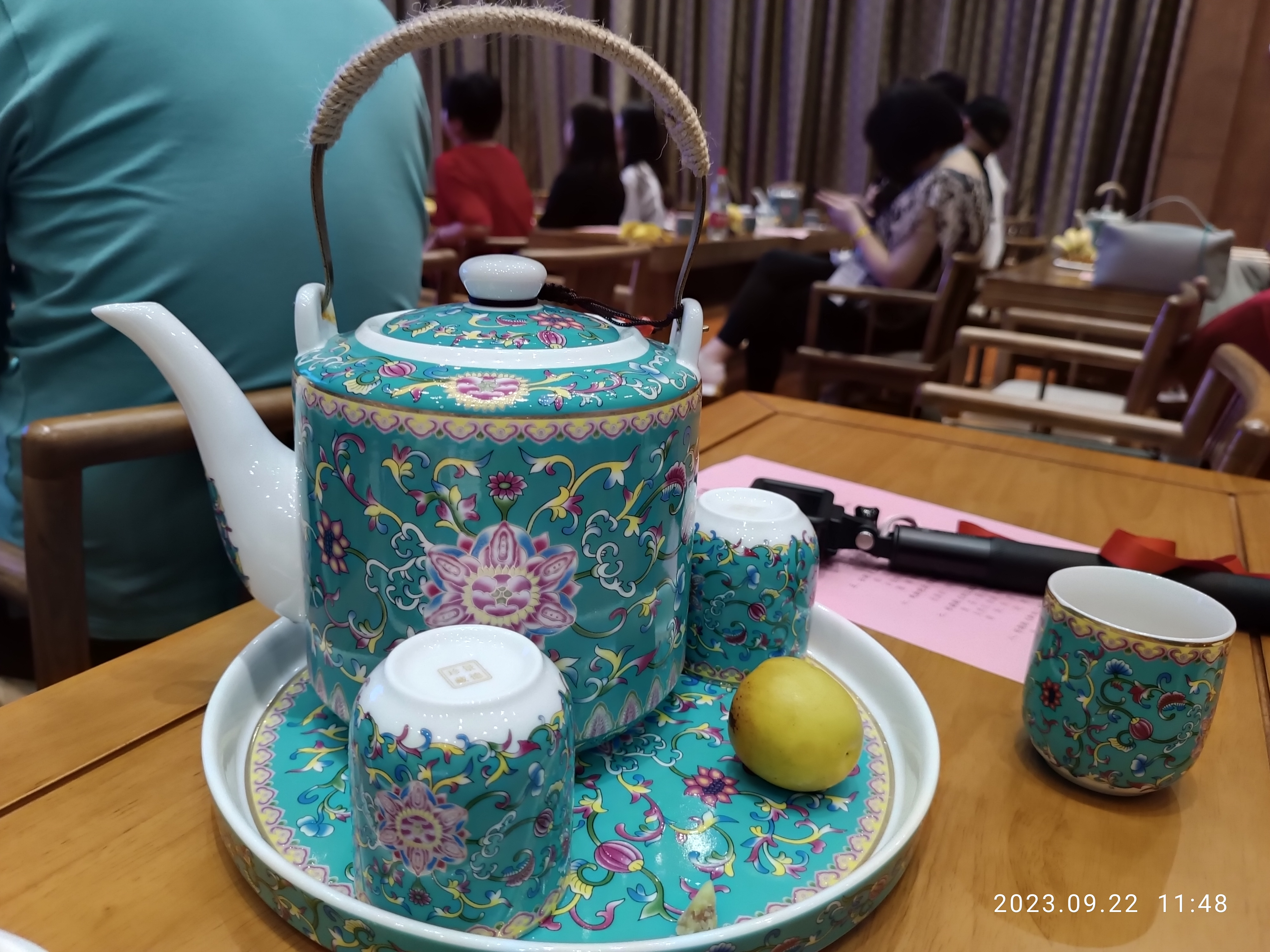
Large Chinese teapot with large cups in a Nanning theater, Guangxi

Another method for making tea is to use a small lidded cup called a gaiwan or a small ceramic teapot (100 to 150 ml) for brewing. This is one of the most common types of teaware used in the modern gongfu cha style ("making tea with skill") in which the tea (brewed with a large leaf to water ratio, like 5 grams per 100ml of water) is poured out into tiny cups. This style of tea making generally reserved for more formal situations and cultured venues, like art teahouses (chayiguan) and it is practiced by Chinese tea enthusiasts. The gaiwan can also serve as a teacup, and some Chinese will also drink tea directly from the gaiwan, using the lid to push aside floating leaves. In the Ming era, gaiwans were originally used as a teacup in this way.

Yet another method is to brew tea in much larger teapot with much lower amount of leaf, in a manner similar to western tea brewing which generally uses larger pots and less tea leaf. This was also the common way to make tea in north China during the Qing dynasty. This style of brewing is still common in some regions, though it may not considered as cultured or refined as the gongfu cha method. Large pot tea brewing is common in Hong Kong, where a type of milk tea called pantyhose milk tea (simat naaicha) made with CTC tea, sugar and evaporated milk is popular.

In contemporary China, tea bags and bottled tea have become more widespread.

=== Chinese tea ceremony ===
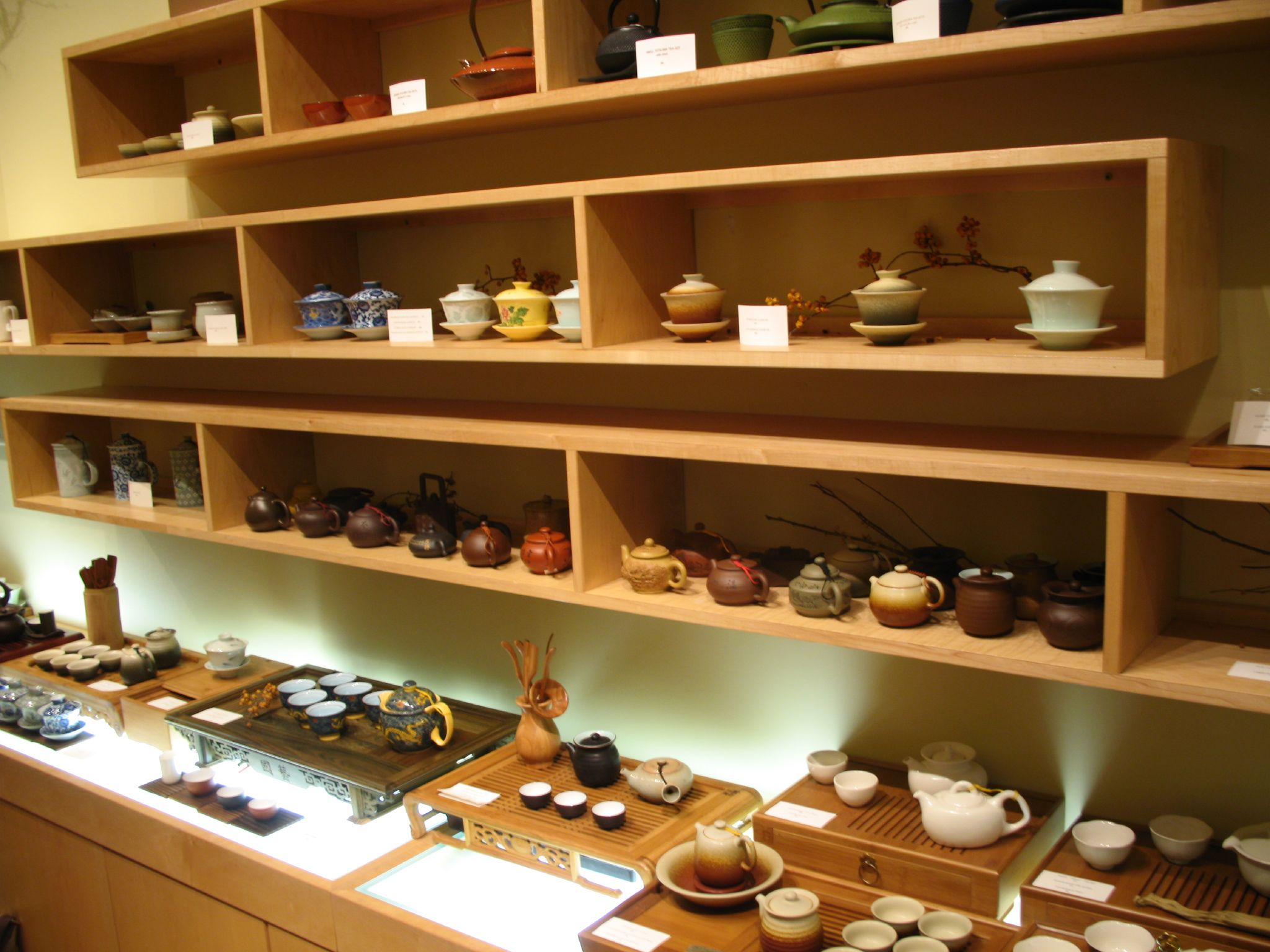
Various gongfu tea sets in a shop in China

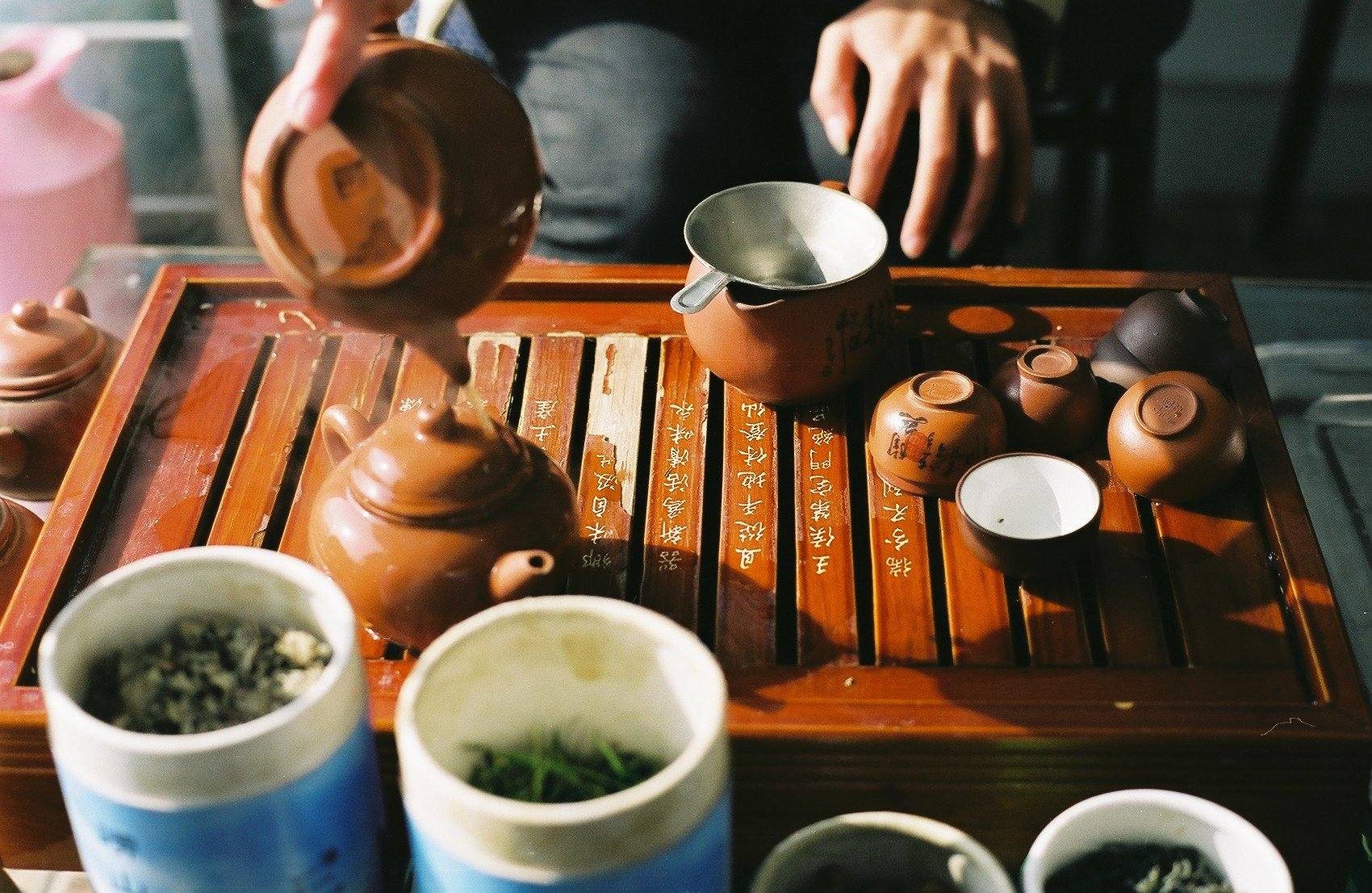
Gongfu style Chinese tea preparation using a Yixing clay teapot

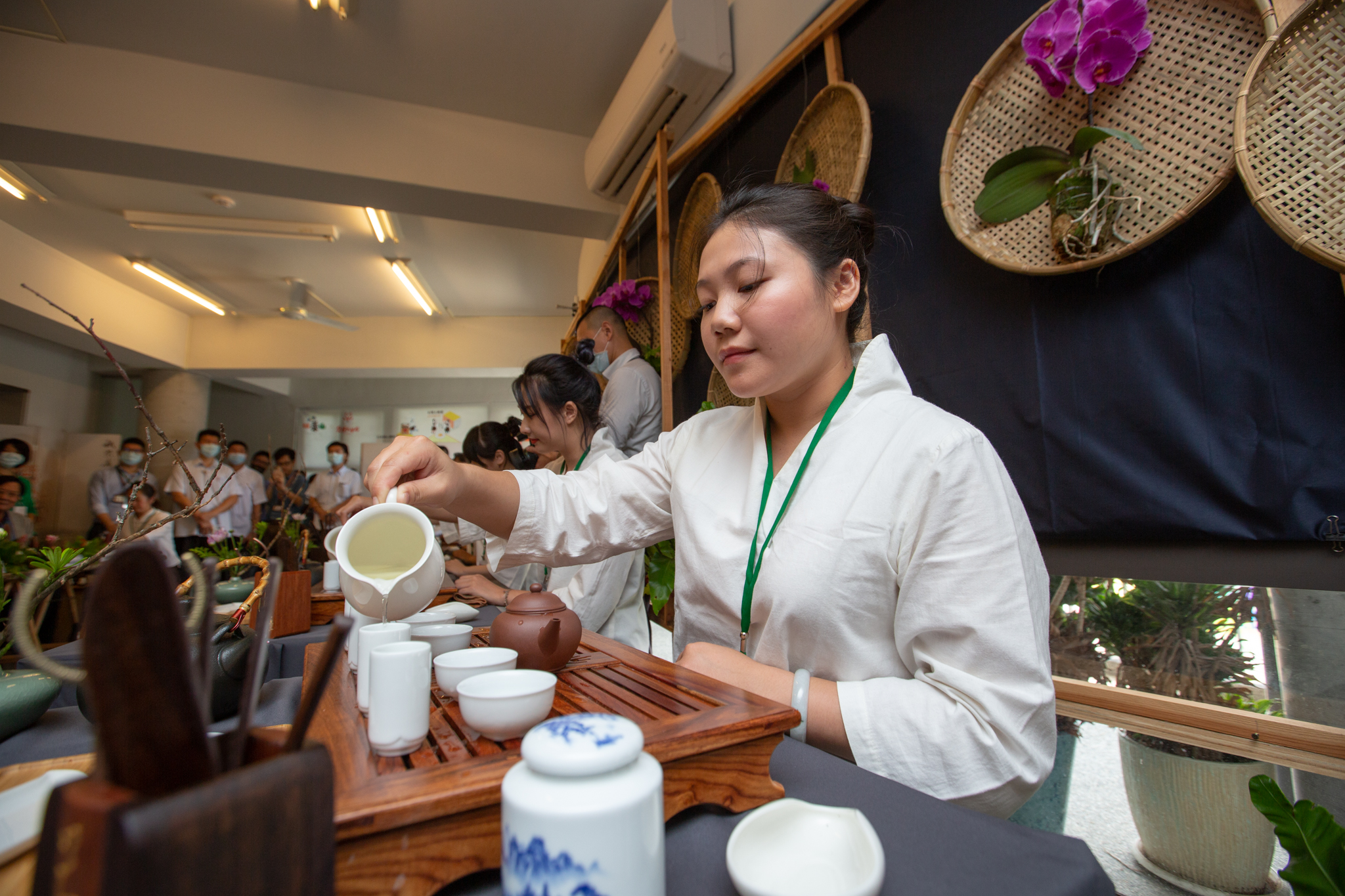
Gongfu tea brewing

The Chinese tea ceremony (which may be called 茶道; chadao; "the way of tea") is a typical Chinese activity involving the formal preparation and presentation of tea. It has held great cultural significance in China for over a thousand years. The important role of ceremony in Chinese culture is exemplified by the claim of the authors of Tea and Tea drinking: China's outstanding contribution to the mankind that, "The word 'ceremony' (Li, 礼) is the basis or gene of Chinese culture and the first syllable of Chinese civilization, as it says Of all things, courtesy comes first' (万事礼为先)." The Chinese tea ceremony grew in popularity in the Tang dynasty, reaching its peak in the Song dynasty.

Gongfu cha, meaning "making tea with skill", is the most popular method of brewing tea in China. It makes use of small teapots or vessels holding about 100–150 ml (4 or 5 fl.oz.), the size being thought to enhance the aesthetics and to "round out" the taste of the tea being brewed. Common types of tea brewing vessels include Yixing teapots, Jingdezhen porcelain and gaiwans. Small tea cups are being used along with Yixing teapots. Gongfu tea is best consumed after meal to help digestion. Brewing tea in a Yixing teapot can be done for private enjoyment as well as to welcome guests. Depending on the region of China, there may be differences in the steps of brewing as well as the tools used in the process. For example, Taiwanese-style gongfu cha makes use of several additional instruments including tweezers, a smelling cup and a tea strainer.

The basic steps of a tea ceremony include: prepare tea, offer or serve tea, appreciate tea, sniff tea, savor and drink, and taste tea. Fine tea is required in both the formal tea ceremony and the tea competition. The Chinese tea ceremony is grounded on high-quality tea that "embodies the soul of the mountains and rivers, the essence of heaven and earth, and the loving care of man." The second essential element is high-quality water. The highest quality water is 'Tiashui', rain or snow water collected in bamboo tubes or crocks, with natural spring water coming in second. Lu Yu set 20 different levels of water quality.

The next important part of fine tea is an aesthetically pleasing tea service allowing for the fragrance of the tea to be appreciated. The Book of Tea described 24 different tea tools and methods of preparing tea.

Where the tea is taken is also a part of the fine tea experience. Tea is considered special if served on hills with mist or cool breezes and in the moonlight. According to Liu Tong: "The Chinese emphasize the harmony between humans and nature in tea drinking." During the Ming dynasty, there were specific rules surrounding when, where, and what environment was appropriate for the drinking of tea. A person should be relaxed and not too busy when taking tea. He should be in a peaceful setting, such as a courtyard, bridge, the forest, or a pavilion with lotus in the background. The weather should also be nice, rainy, or in moderate sunshine. Tea should be taken in a peaceful, tranquil setting, not a tense, noisy one. Tea should be experienced with only a few people at a time. As Cai Xiang states in his book, Record of Tea (1051), "The fewer guests when drinking tea, the better. A crowd of guests is noisy, and noise detracts from the elegance of the occasion. Drinking tea alone is serenity, with two guests is superior, with three or four is interesting, with five or six is extensive, and with seven or eight is an imposition."

The tea ceremony is a tradition that exemplifies Chinese culture that has spread throughout the world, including in Japan, Korea, and Great Britain.

== The arts and tea ==
During the Tang and Song dynasties, literati produced poetry, calligraphy, and paintings to show their cultivated minds and express themselves. They became enthusiastic tea drinkers as they worked on their art. "Talented drinkers also raised the general tone of tea drinking by associating it with other refined pursuits such as art, music, and literature." Lu Yu, the author of The Classic of Tea, was also an accomplished poet and calligrapher. Following is an excerpt of a famous tea poem written in the 8th century CE when tea art and literature were just emerging.

The first bowl sleekly moistened throat and lips;

The second banished all my loneliness;

The third expelled the dullness from my mind,

Sharpening inspiration gained from all the books I've read.

The fourth brought forth light perspiration,

Dispersing a lifetime's troubles through my pores.

The fifth bowl cleansed ev'ry atom of my being.

The sixth has made me kin to the Immortals.

The seventh is the utmost I can drink

This poem was a thank you note from Yu espousing the virtues of tea after receiving it as a gift. Giving gifts of tea was a common practice at this time and usually was reciprocated with a note and high-quality tea given in return. Often artists would send a poem along with the gift of tea, and the recipient would send another poem with a return gift of tea. From the gifts the term 'benevolent tea'(huicha) was coined.

Writing poetry was extremely popular during the Tang and Song dynasties and was considered a requirement to be among this group of scholarly men. According to Hinsch, "... readers today can still enjoy more than forty-eight thousand surviving poems written by two thousand poets from the Tang dynasty alone... Songwriters continued to use tea as a stock poetic theme, and some of the greatest literary figures of that era, such as Su Shi, wrote enthusiastically and repeatedly about tea."

Calligraphy is another art form that was very popular among the artisans of the Tang and Song, in which they integrated tea culture. Some of the calligraphy considered masterpieces of this era are centered around tea. For example, a casual note from Su Shi to a friend inviting him to tea housed at the National Palace Museum in Beijing, is considered an artistic treasure because of its beauty.

== Tea drinking customs ==
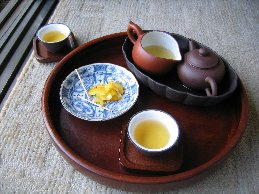
A set of equipment for drinking tea

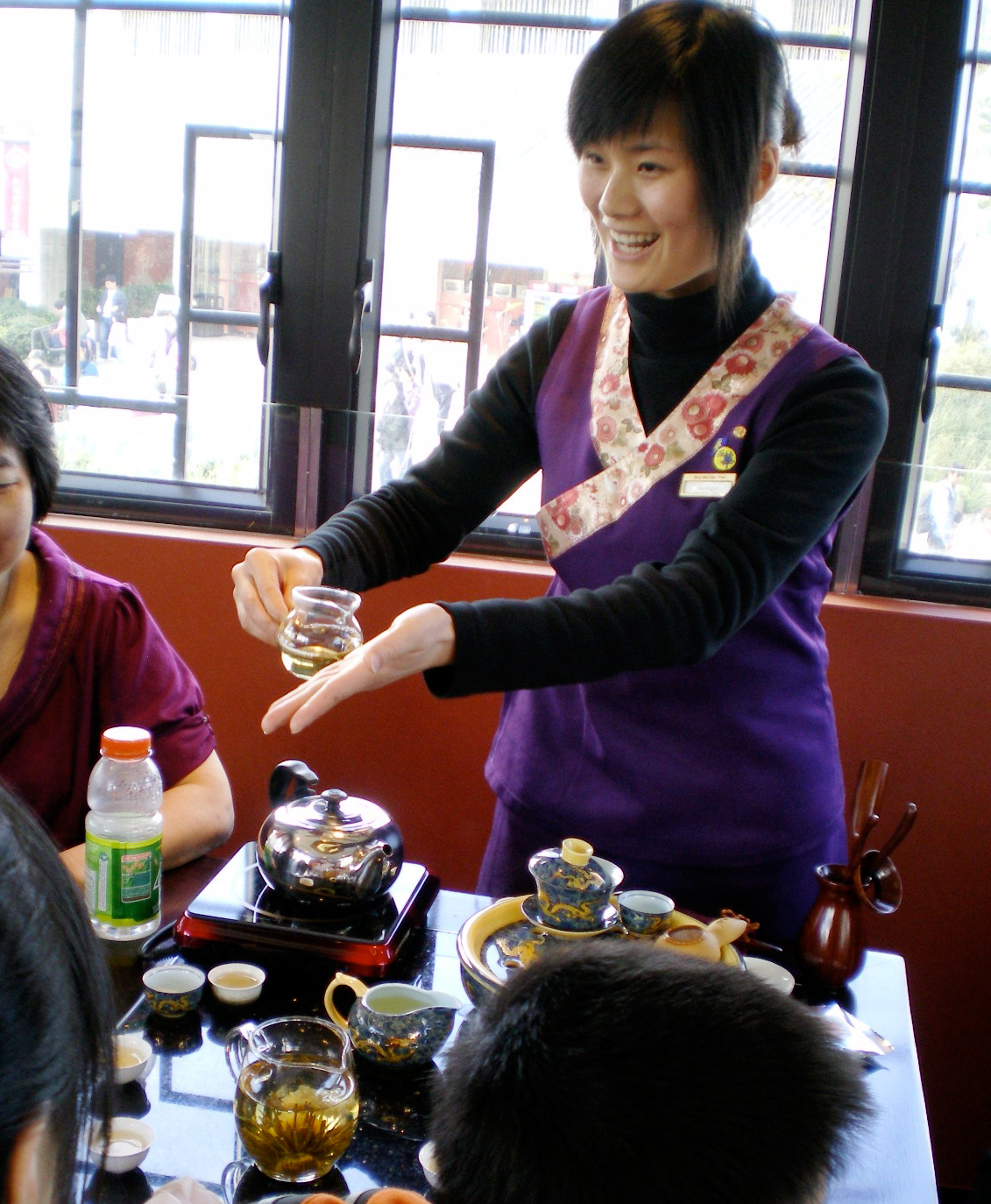
A hostess serves tea at a traditional Chinese tea house.

Tea customs vary among different groups of people, regions, lifestyles, and religions. "Chinese tea arts include Confucianism tea, Taoism tea, Buddhism tea, and vulgar tea (俗茶) 'tea of the public', which conform to the corresponding religious morals and behavior standards." Drinking tea for the Taoists represents how the body and soul are regarded as one and improving oneself through self-cultivation; tea helps the Buddhist understand the meaning of Zen; while the Confucians believe tea and drinking tea are used for hospitality representing their humanistic views.

China's national minority cultures have their own tea customs. In the words of Li Xiousong, "The Tibetans put tea before food." A gift of brick tea is considered the most valuable gift. They give butter tea to the most distinguished guests, salt tea to regular guests, and plain tea to people of Han nationality. Mongolian herdsmen drink milk tea. When a guest visits, they are invited in and presented with a cup of tea from the host, prepared by the hostess. Not accepting the tea would be considered extremely rude and offensive.

There are several special circumstances in which tea is prepared and consumed in Chinese culture, and is preserved completely in mainland China and Taiwan.

=== The Justice Cup ===
Chahai tea utensils, also known as Gong Dao Bei or "Cup of Equality," are a key tool for tea connoisseurs. It is used to ensure that each glass has the same strength and flavor. It can be made of different materials (glass, porcelain or clay).

The history of Chahai is closely linked to Chinese tea culture. With the growing popularity of tea ceremonies, it became important to provide exactly the same drink to each guest, avoiding the risk of the first and the last pour having a different taste. Chahai, also known as the "Cup of Equality," was created as a response to this challenge.

=== A sign of hospitality ===
Hospitality is important in Chinese culture, and offering tea to a guest is considered customary practice. A guest is expected to accept the tea and take at least a sip as a sign of appreciation.

=== A sign of respect ===
According to Chinese tradition, members of the younger generation should show their respect to members of the older generation by offering a cup of tea. Inviting their elders to restaurants for tea is a traditional holiday activity. Newly married couples serve tea to their elder family members. In the past, people of a lower social class served tea to the upper class in society. Today, with the increasing liberalization of Chinese society, this rule and its connotations have become blurred.

=== To apologize ===
In Chinese culture, tea may be offered as part of a formal apology. For example, children who have misbehaved may serve tea to their parents as a sign of regret and submission.

=== To show gratitude and celebrate weddings ===
In the traditional Chinese marriage ceremony, the bride and groom kneel in front of their respective parents, as well as elderly relatives such as grand parents and serve them tea and then thank them, together which represents an expression of their gratitude and respect. According to the tradition, the bride and groom serve both families. This process symbolizes the joining of the two families.

=== Tea drinking style ===
==== Tang dynasty boiling tea method ====
The tea was cooked directly in the kettle. This was the most common tea method in China's Tang dynasty. Tea leaves are crushed while water is boiled, seasoning is added and the mixture sprinkle into the pot. When drinking, the tea dregs and tea soup together while hot, called "eat tea". Tang people cooking tea once like to add seasoning to the tea soup, such as salt, onion, ginger or orange peel, and so on.

==== Song dynasty point tea method ====
This method of drinking tea was used in the Song dynasty, and tea people ate from this method. Song dynasty tea drinking method rose to the height of aesthetics and reached the ultimate. They decorated the tea cake with many dragon and phoenix patterns, very delicate, called "dragon and phoenix group tea". When drinking tea, first, the cake tea is crushed into a fine powder, with boiling water, to brew some tea. To make the tea powder and water into one, with a tea brush quickly hit, the tea and water fully mingle and make a lot of white tea froth. This is where the Japanese matcha ceremony originated.

==== Ming dynasty tea brewing method ====
By the Ming dynasty, the tea-making and drinking method was simplified again and again. Zhu Yuanzhang vigorously promoted loose tea, which led to tea alienation, before only green tea, and then slowly appeared other tea types. The tea brewing method continues today, brewing tea without any seasoning, drinking the original taste of tea, the authentic flavor, while the tea tools and techniques used to brew tea also simplified a lot, more conducive to the spread of tea culture.

=== Finger tapping ===
Light finger tapping is an informal way to thank the tea master or tea server for tea. While or after one's cup is filled, the receiver of the tea may tap the index and middle fingers (one or more in combination) to express gratitude to the person who served the tea. This custom is common in southern China, where meals are often accompanied by many servings of tea.

This custom is said to have originated in the Qing dynasty when the Qianlong Emperor traveled in disguise throughout the empire and his accompanying servants were instructed not to reveal their master's identity. One day in a restaurant in southern China, the emperor poured tea for a servant. To that servant it was a huge honor to have the emperor pour him a cup of tea. Out of habit, he wanted to kneel and bow to express his thanks to the emperor, however he could not do this since that would reveal the emperor's identity. Instead, he tapped the table with bent fingers to represent kneeling to the Emperor and to express his gratitude and respect. In this sense, the bent fingers supposedly signify a bowing servant.

In formal tea ceremonies nodding the head or saying "thank you" is more appropriate.

== Tea growing and processing ==
Another important element of Chinese tea culture are the methods used to grow and process tea.

=== Roasting and brewing ===
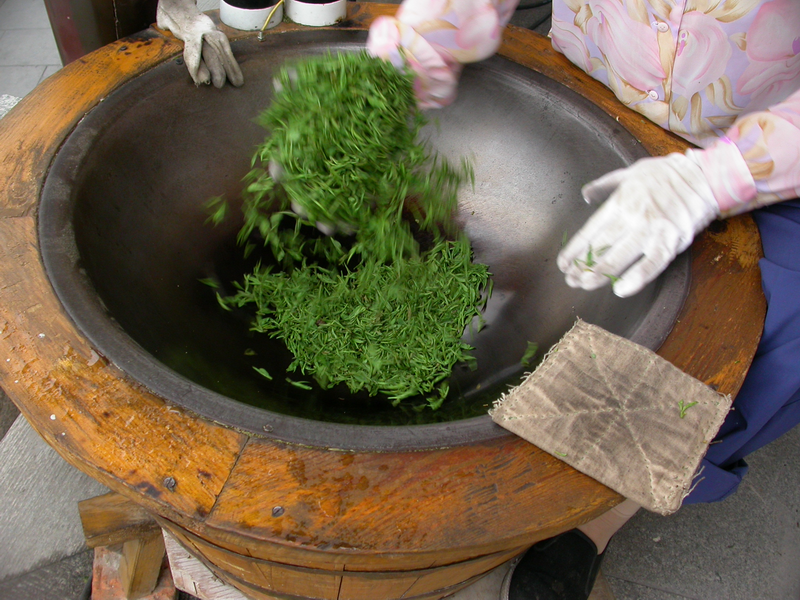
Tea roasting

Steaming tea leaves was the primary process used for centuries in the preparation of tea. After the transition from compressed tea, the production of tea for trade and distribution changed once again. The Chinese learned to process tea in a different way in the mid-13th century. Back in the Tang Dynasty, tea was commonly prepared by bringing water to a boil and taking a cup of water out from the pot. Afterwards, the water would be stirred and tea powder would be poured into the swirling water. Finally, the water which was scooped out earlier was then poured back in which prevented the tea from over-boiling.

=== Fermentation ===
After cutting, tea is subjected to a so-called "fermentation." This process is not actually a fermentation, which is an anaerobic process, but rather an enzymatic oxidization of the polyphenols in the tea leaves, yielding theaflavins and thearubigins. When the tea leaves are dry, fermentation stops, allowing some control of the process by manipulation of the drying rate or adding water after drying. Fermentation can also be interrupted by heat, for example by steaming or dry-panning the tea leaves through a technique known as shāqīng (殺青). In 17th century China numerous advances were made in tea production. In the southern part of China, tea leaves were sun dried and then half fermented, producing Oolong or "black dragon tea." However, this method was not common in the rest of China. Tea was used for medical purposes, and salt was often added to alter its bitter taste.

== Influence on Chinese culture ==
The culture of tea has been an essential part of self-cultivation since roughly the Tang dynasty, especially associated with Chinese Chan Buddhism (in Japan Zen).

=== Teaware ===
Different teawares can affect people's expectations of tea. First of all, different teaware will affect how people feel about drinking tea. When tea is drunk with a tea set that looks ornamental, people's mood will become pleasant; when the teaware is not so ornamental, people's pleasure in drinking tea will be reduced. Secondly, the visual effect of the teaware affects people's expectations of the bitterness of the tea. The better the teaware, the more bitter people will think the tea is, and the more bitter the tea is, the better the tea is. So the teaware also influences people's judgment of the value of tea when no price information was provided. The practice of drinking tea was considered to be an expression of personal morality, education, social principles, and status. The price of tea ware varies depending on the material and quality of it. A set of jade tea ware can cost hundreds of thousands dollars whereas a set of low quality tea ware may only cost less than a hundred dollars. Increased enthusiasm for tea drinking led to the greater production of teaware.

=== Teahouse ===
Ancient Chinese scholars used the teahouse as a place for sharing ideas. The teahouse was where political allegiances and social rank were said to have been temporarily suspended in favor of honest and rational discourse. It is a paradise for tea lovers, but also a place for people to rest, recreation and socialization. Likewise, the teahouse is a microcosm or window of society, Chinese teahouse has a long history, as early as the Tang Emperor Xuanzong period, only then not called the teahouse called "tea store". The leisurely consumption of tea promoted conviviality and civility among the participants. The teahouse is not only a minor by-product of Chinese tea culture; it offers historical evidence of Chinese tea history. Today, people can also sense a humanistic atmosphere in Beijing's Lao She Teahouse and other East China cities like Hangzhou, Suzhou, Yangzhou, Nanjing, Wuxi, Shaoxing, Shanghai, and other places. The teahouse atmosphere is still dynamic and vigorous.

=== Spirituality and religion ===
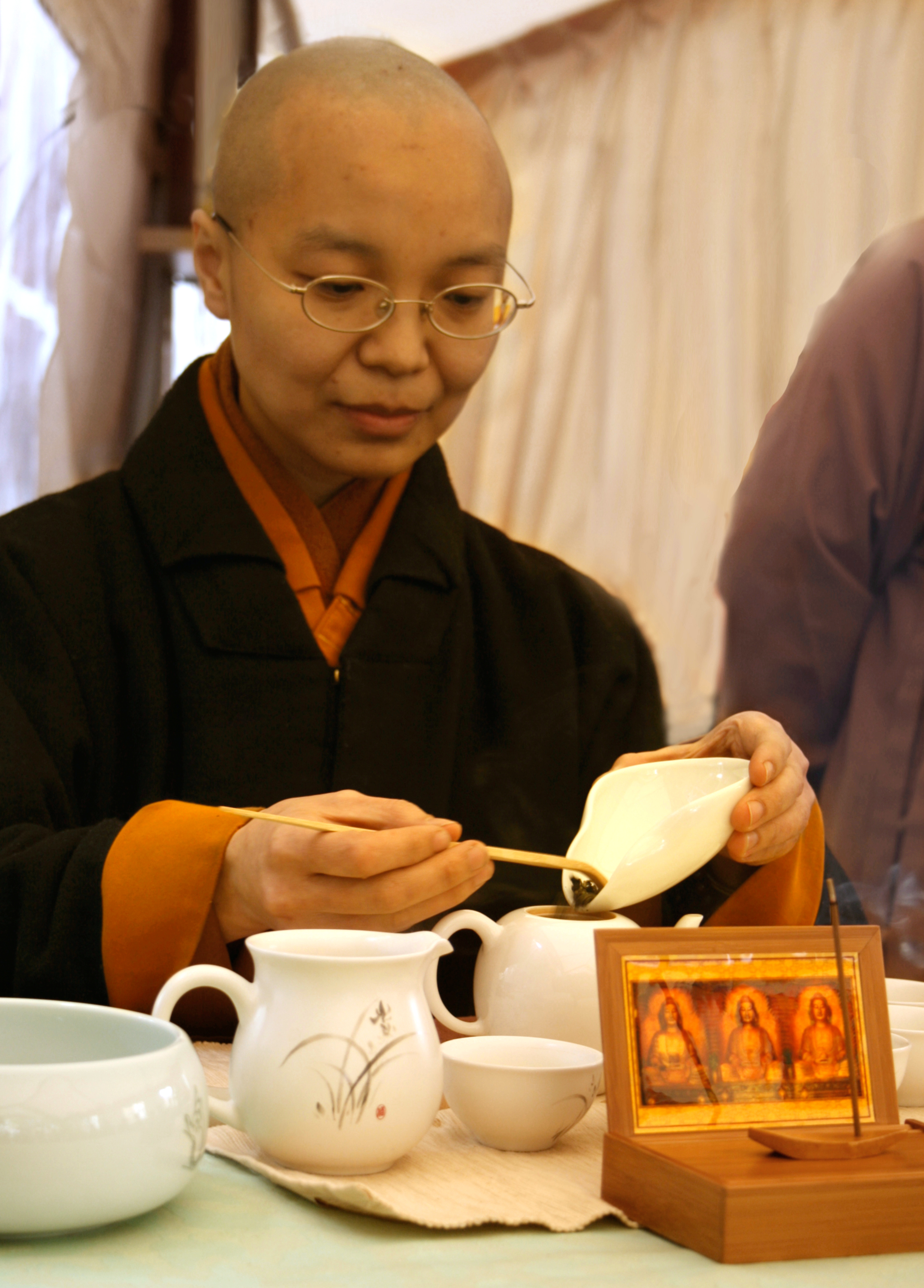
Taiwanese bhiksuni (Buddhist nun) at a Vesak celebration, serving Oolong tea in the gongfu style.

Chinese tea culture holds a significant place not only as a social and cultural activity but also within Chinese spirituality and religion. The interplay between tea culture and Chinese religion is profound, influencing the practices, and worldviews of the various Chinese religions. A modern Chinese article on tea states "It is believed that a tea-drinking process is a spiritual enjoyment, an art, a means of cultivating the moral character, and nourishing the mind." The modern Chinese tea ceremony may be seen to have spiritual components by some contemporary practitioners, depending on their worldview. Chinese tea culture may be associated with values like harmony, propriety, peace, happiness, simplicity, and physical cultivation.

Tea has played a crucial role in Buddhist monastic life, especially within Chan (Zen) Buddhism. The preparation and drinking of tea helped Buddhist monks in staying awake and focused during long hours of meditation. The simplicity and naturalness of drinking tea resonated with Buddhist values of simplicity and mindfulness and tea drinking was often an occasion for religious and philosophical discussion. As such, Buddhist monasteries became centers for tea cultivation and production. The exchange of tea among monasteries and lay followers facilitated a sense of community and mutual support, and allowed monasteries to raise funds. Tea is also used as a ceremonial offering to the Buddhas and is often placed on Buddhist altars.

In Confucian thought, tea drinking became associated with social rituals and the cultivation of social harmony. The tea ceremony is seen to reflect the Confucian ideals of propriety (li) and respect in social interactions. The act of preparing and serving tea, especially for one's family, is also seen as a means of self-cultivation, promoting Confucian virtues such as respect, filial piety, and humility. Furthermore, Confucian scholars often used tea gatherings as a way to discuss Confucian philosophy.

Daoists often sees tea as an important drink for promoting health since they believe that tea aids in the cultivation and balancing of qi (breath energy, vital energy). The energy or spirit of tea (cha qi) is seen as being able to harmonize the body and mind, promoting health and longevity as well as aiding one in attaining spiritual enlightenment. In Daoist practice, the preparation and consumption of tea may even be seen as part of Chinese alchemy.

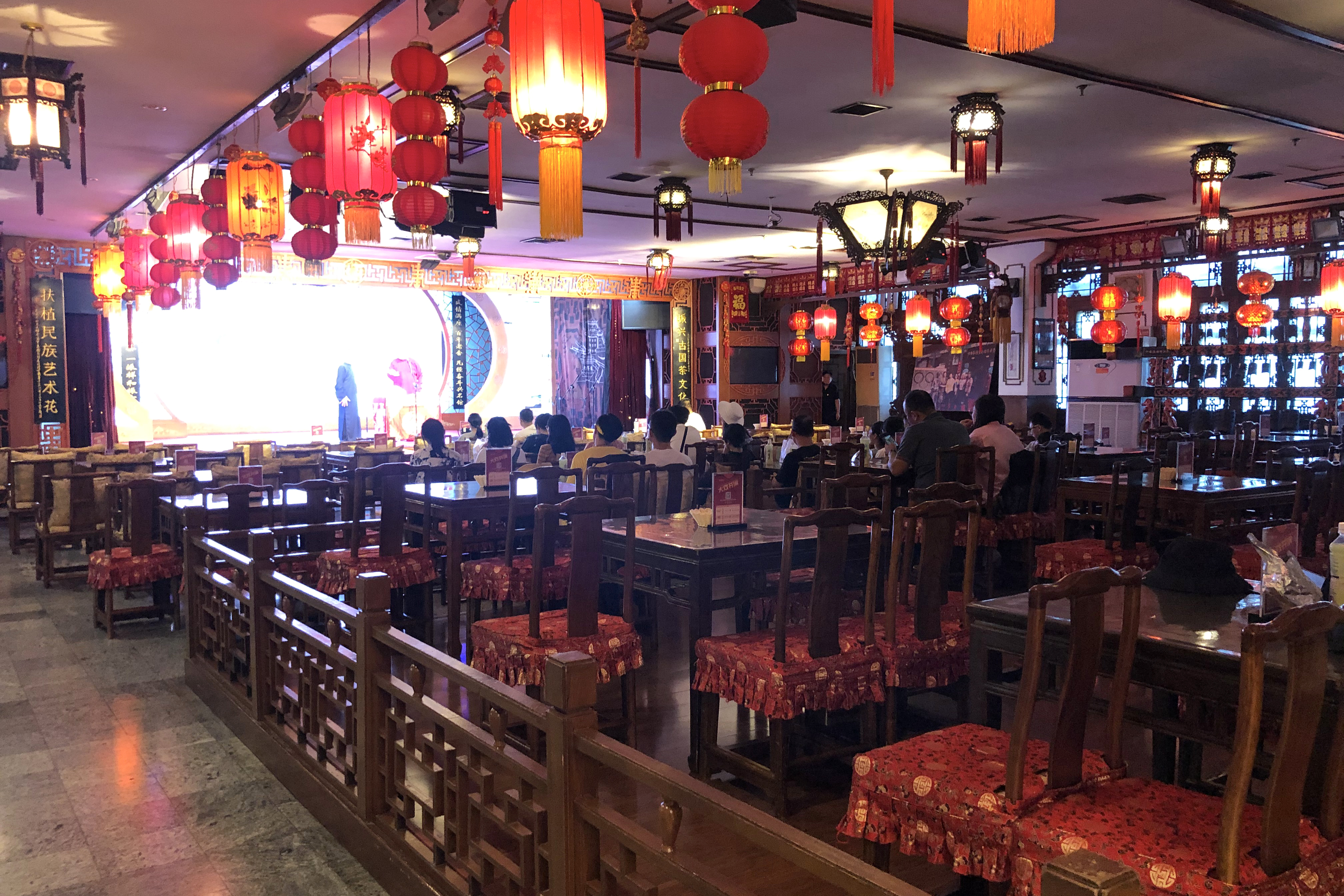
Large teahouses can be equipped with stages performing traditional arts

=== Modern culture ===
In modern China, virtually every dwelling has a set of tea implements for brewing a cup of hot tea. They are symbols of welcome for visitors or neighbors. Traditionally, a visitor to a Chinese home is expected to sit down and drink tea while talking; visiting while remaining standing is considered uncouth.

Tea was regarded as one of the seven daily necessities, the others being firewood, rice, oil, salt, soy sauce, and vinegar. There are many different types of tea such as: green tea, oolong tea, red tea, black tea, white tea, yellow tea, puerh tea and flower tea. Traditionally, fresh tea leaves are regularly turned over in a deep bowl. This process allows the leaves dry in a way that preserves their full flavor, ready for use.

== See also ==
- Chinese tea
- China National Tea Museum
- Chinese social relations
- Chinese tea ceremony schools
- East Asian tea ceremony
- Gongfu tea ceremony
- Tea classics
- Tea pet
- Tea-picking opera
- Teaism
- The Classic of Tea
- Yum cha
