= Tea classics =

Historical treatises or notable writings on tea and tea brewing

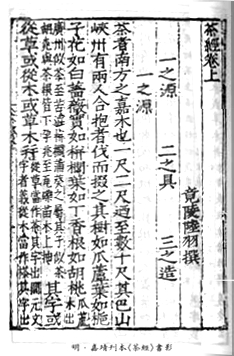
- Lu Yu: The Classic of Tea

Chinese name
- Traditional Chinese: 茶書
- Simplified Chinese: 茶书
Transcriptions
Standard Mandarin
- Hanyu Pinyin: chá shū

Japanese name
- Kanji: 茶書

Tea as a drink was first consumed in China and the earliest extant mention of tea in literature is the Classic of Poetry, although the ideogram used (荼) in these texts can also designate a variety of plants, such as sowthistle and thrush.

Chinese literature contains a significant number of ancient treatises on tea. Together, there exist approximately one hundred monographs or treatises on tea published from the Tang dynasty through the end of the Ming dynasty. Writers of non-Chinese backgrounds have also emulated the style of the Chinese tea classics.

The more famous books on tea are listed below.

== Chinese ==
=== Tang dynasty ===
- The Classic of Tea (茶經) by Lu Yu, 780.
- Report on Water for Brewing Tea by Zhang Youxin, 814.
- Records of Tea Picking (采茶录; Chai Cha Lu) by Wen Tingyun (温庭筠), 860.

=== Song dynasty ===
- The Record of Tea (茶录) by Cai Xiang (蔡襄), 1049.
- Report on Tasting of East Brook Tea (东溪试茶录; Dong Qi Shi Cha Lu) by Song Zian (宋子安), 1064.
- Treatise on Tea (大观茶论) by Emperor Song Huizong (宋徽宗), 1107.
- Record of Xuan He Era Tribute Tea in The North Farm (宣和北苑贡茶录; Xuan He Bei Yuan Gong Cha Lu) by Xiong Fan (熊蕃).
- Essential Record of Tea Tasting (品茶要录; Pin Cha Yiao Lu) by Huang Ru (黄儒), 1075.
- Pictorial of Tea Ware (茶具图赞) by The Old Man Shenan (审安老人).

=== Ming dynasty ===
- Zhu Quan (朱权): Cha Pu (茶谱), 1440.
- Gu Yuanqing (顾元庆): Classification of Tea (茶谱; Cha Pu), 1541.
- Lu Shusheng (陆树声): A Report on Tea House (茶寮记; Cha Liao Ji), 1570.
- Tu Long (屠隆): Kao Pan Yu Shi (考槃余事; "Desultory Remarks on Furnishing the Abode of the Retired Scholar"), c.1590.
- Gao Lian (高濂): Eight Discourses on the Art of Living/ Tea (遵生八笺; Jun Sheng Ba Jian), 1591.
- Hu Wenhuan (胡文焕): Tea Collection (茶集), 1593.
- Chen Shi (陈师): Research on Tea (茶考; Cha Kao), 1593.
- Chen Jiru (陈继儒): Tea Talks (茶话), 1595.
- Zhang Yuan (张源): Tea Notes (茶录), 1595.
- Zhang Qiande (张谦德): The Book of Tea (茶经), 1598.
- Xiong Mingyu (熊明遇): Report on Lu Jie Tea, (罗岕茶记; Luo Jie Cha Ji), c.1608.
- Feng Shike (冯时可): Tea Record (茶录; Cha Lu), 1609.
- Wen Zhenheng (文震亨): Treatise on Superfluous Things/ Incense and Tea (长物志; Zhang Wu Zhi), 1621.
- Wen Long (闻龙): Tea Notes (茶笺; Cha Jian), 1630.
- Zhou Gaoqi (周高起): Treatise On Yixing Teapots (陽羨茗壺系; Yángxiàn Mínghú Xì), c.1640.
- Zhou Gaoqi: Report on Tongshan Jie Tea (洞山岕茶系; Tongshan Jie Cha Xi), 1640.

=== Qing dynasty ===
- Lu Tingcan (陸廷燦): The Sequel to Classic of Tea (續茶經).
- Qianlong Emperor (乾隆帝): Imperial Record of Jade Spring Hill, First Spring under Heaven (御製玉泉山天下第一泉記), 1784.

== Japanese ==
- Myōan Eisai (明菴栄西): Treatise on Tea Drinking for Health (喫茶養生記), 1193.

Eisai (Yosai) came to Tiantai mountain of Zhejiang to study Chan (Zen) Buddhism (1168 AD); when he returned home in 1193 AD, he brought tea from China to Japan, planted it and wrote the first Japanese treatise on tea, called Kissa yojoki (喫茶養生記, Treatise on Drinking Tea for Health). This was the beginning of tea cultivation and tea culture in Japan.

- Sen no Rikyū (千利休) (1522 – April 21, 1591): Southern Record (南方録).

== English ==
- Okakura Kakuzō (岡倉 覚三): The Book of Tea (originally written in English by Okakura), 1906.
- A Nice Cup of Tea essay by George Orwell, 1946.

== Translations ==
=== Modern Chinese ===
- 陆羽《茶经》 －解读与点校, 程启坤 杨招棣 姚国坤. 上海 上海文艺出版社 2003 ISBN 7-80646-567-7
- 茶经 ISBN 957-763-053-7
- 遵生八笺——白话全译, 重庆大学出版社

=== Czech ===
- Lu Jü : Kniha o čaji. Translated by Olga Lomová. Spolek milců čaje a DharmaGaia, Praha, 2002, ISBN 80-86685-01-2.
- Karel Valter : Vše o čaji pro čajomily, Granit s.r.o., Praha, 2000

=== English ===
- The Classic of Tea (ISBN 0-316-53450-1) Lu, Yu; Intro & Translation By Francis Ross Carpenter, Illustrated by Hitz, Demi;Boston, MA: Little, Brown & Co. 1974
- The Classic of Tea: Origins & Rituals (ISBN 0-88001-416-4) Lu, Yu; Yu, Lu; Carpenter, Francis Ross; New York, U.S.A.: Ecco Press. 1995 reprint of 1974 edition. This is a complete translation.

=== French ===
- Vianney, Soeur Jean-Marie: Le Classique Du The Par Lu Yu, Morel - 1977

=== Hungarian ===
- Lu Jü: Teáskönyv – A teázás szent könyve a nyolcadik századi Kínából. (Translation By Zsolt Tokaji and Barbara Nyiredy.) Terebess Kiadó, Budapest 2005, ISBN 963-9147-69-9
- Teáskönyv. (Trans., ed, by Zsolt Tokaji.) Fapadoskonyv.hu, Budapest, 2010. ISBN 978-963-329-005-7

=== Italian ===
- Lu Yu: IL CANONE DEL TÈ, Traduzione (dal cinese) di Marco Ceresa, Leonardo. November 1990.
- Marco Ceresa, Ph.D. Dissertation:I trattati sul tè di epoca Tang (Tang Dynasty Monographs on Tea) Far Eastern Studies, Istituto Universitario Orientale of Naples.1992

=== Russian ===
- Лу Юй: Канон чая; перевод с древнекитайского, введение и комментарии Александра Габуева и Юлии Дрейзис. Москва: Гуманитарий, 2007. — 123 с. ISBN 978-5-91367-004-5

== See also ==
- History of tea in China
