= History of tea =

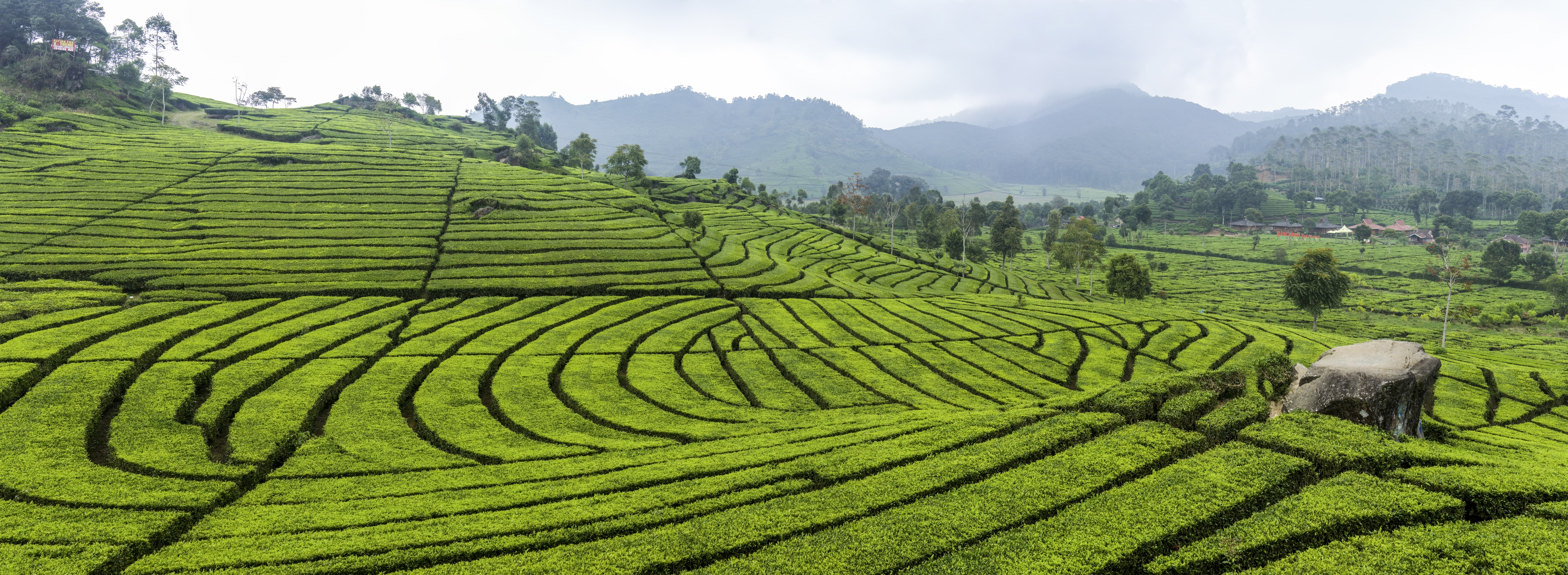
A tea plantation in Ciwidey, Bandung in Indonesia

The history of tea spreads across many cultures throughout thousands of years. The tea plant Camellia sinensis is both native and probably originated in the borderlands of China and northern Myanmar. One of the earliest accounts of tea drinking is dated back to China's Shang dynasty, in which tea was consumed in a medicinal concoction. One traditional method of preparing tea involves steeping loose tea leaves in a teapot and straining them into a cup, a practice that became common in Europe following the introduction of tea by Chinese traders. An early credible record of tea drinking dates to the 3rd century AD, in a medical text written by Chinese physician Hua Tuo. It first became known to the western world through Portuguese priests and merchants in China during the early 16th century. Drinking tea became popular in Britain during the 17th century. To compete with the Chinese monopoly on tea, the British East India Company introduced commercial tea production to British India.

== Geographic origins ==
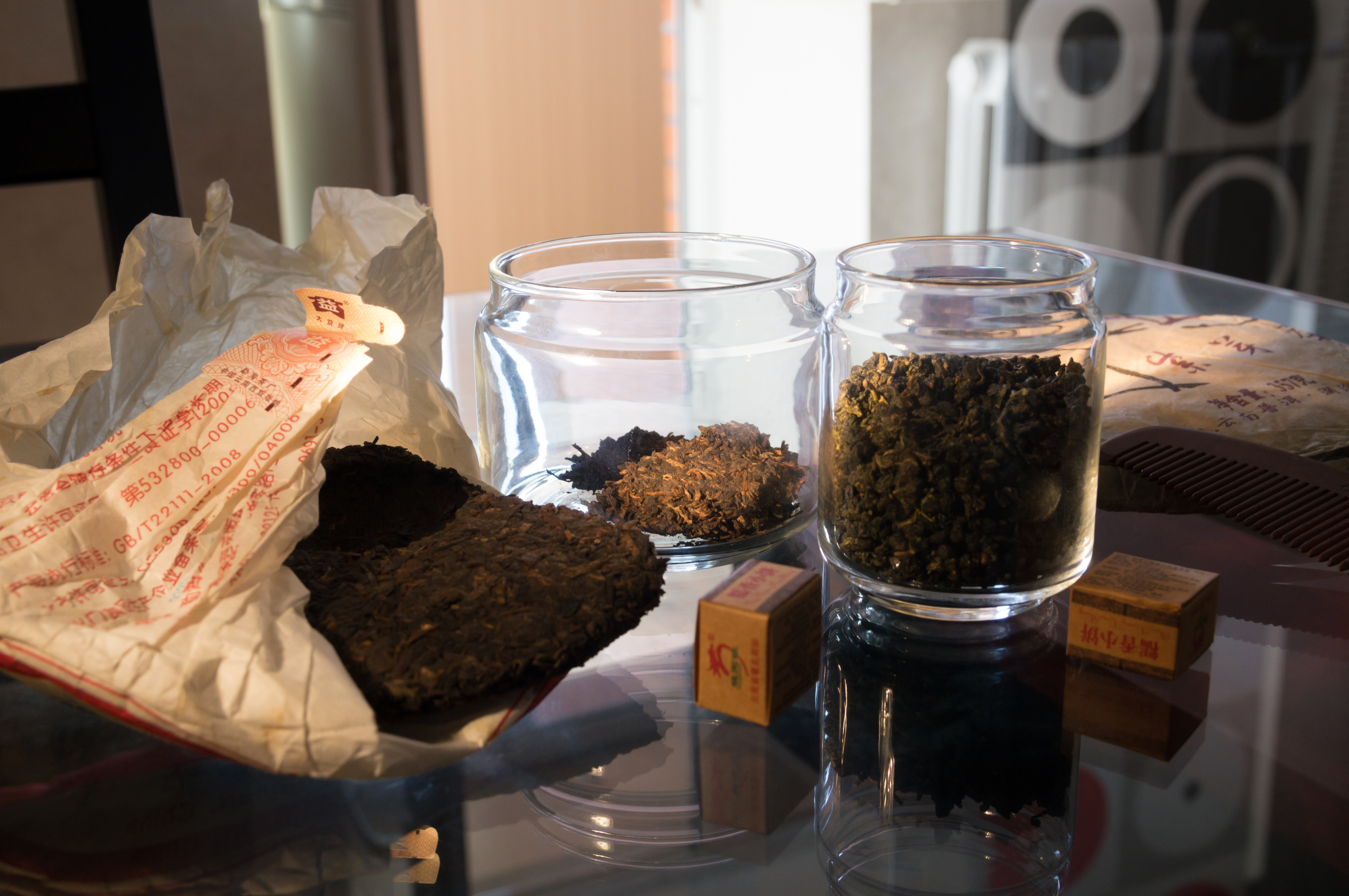
Tea from Yunnan

Camellia sinensis originated specifically around the intersection of latitude 29°N and longitude 98°E, the point of confluence of the lands of southwest China, Tibet, north Myanmar, and northeast India. The plant was introduced to more than 52 countries, from this centre of origin.

On morphological differences between the Assam and Chinese varieties, botanists have long asserted a dual botanical origin for tea; however, statistical cluster analysis, the same chromosome number (2n=30), easy hybridization, and various types of intermediate hybrids and spontaneous polyploids all appear to demonstrate a single place of origin for Camellia sinensis—the area including the Yunnan and Sichuan provinces of China, and northern part of Myanmar.

Tea consumption likely began in Yunnan province during the 2nd millennium BC as a medicinal concoction. From there, the use spread to Sichuan, and it is believed that there "for the first time, people began to boil tea leaves for consumption into a concentrated liquid without the addition of other leaves or herbs, thereby using tea as a bitter yet stimulating drink, rather than as a medicinal concoction."

== Origin narratives ==
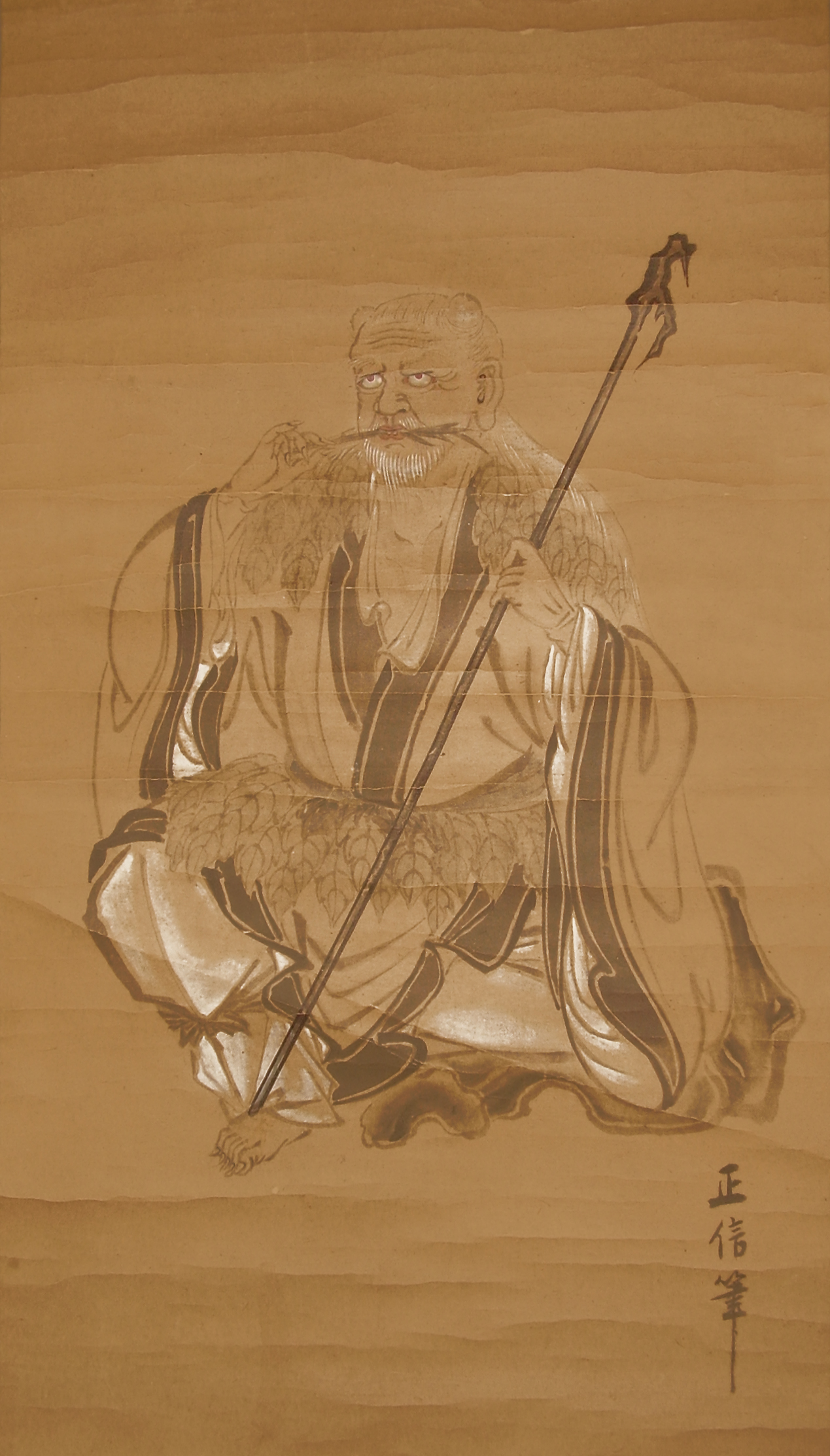
Japanese painting depicting Shennong

In Chinese legend, some time around 2737 BCE, Emperor Shennong was drinking a bowl of just boiled water because of a decree that his subjects must boil water before drinking it. A few leaves were blown from a nearby tree into his water, changing the color and taste. The emperor took a sip of the brew and was pleasantly surprised by its flavor and restorative properties. A variant of the legend tells that the emperor tested the medical properties of various herbs on himself, some of them poisonous, and found tea to work as an antidote. Shennong is also mentioned in Lu Yu's famous early work on the subject, The Classic of Tea. A similar Chinese legend states that Shennong would chew the leaves, stems, and roots of various plants to discover medicinal herbs. If he consumed a poisonous plant, he would chew tea leaves to counteract the poison.

A later legend comes from Japan. In this telling, Bodhidharma, the founder of Chan Buddhism, accidentally fell asleep after meditating in front of a wall for 9 years. He woke up in such disgust at his weakness that he cut off his eyelids. They fell to the ground and took root, growing into tea bushes, the leaves of which could make a drink to keep people from falling asleep. Another version of the story has Gautama Buddha in place of Bodhidharma.

== Early history ==
=== China ===
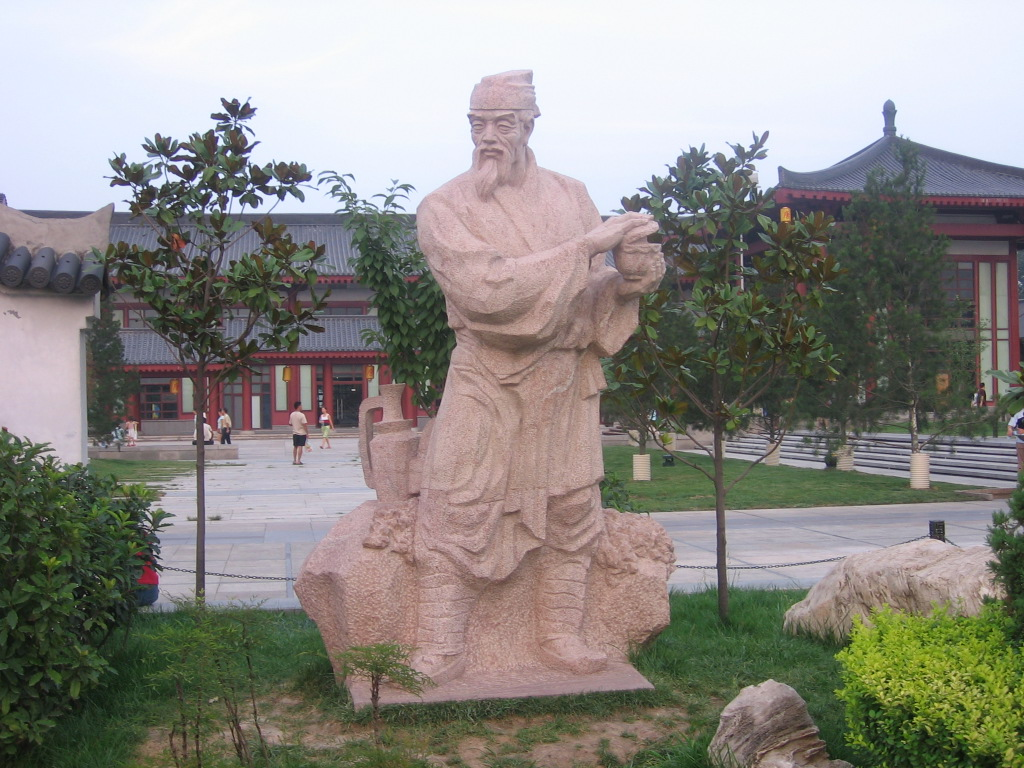
Lu Yu's statue in Xi'an

The Chinese have consumed tea for thousands of years. The earliest physical evidence known to date, found in 2016, comes from the mausoleum of Emperor Jing of Han in Xi'an, indicating that tea was drunk by Han dynasty emperors as early as the 2nd century BCE. The samples were identified as tea from the genus Camellia particularly via mass spectrometry, and written records suggest that it may have been drunk earlier. People of the Han dynasty used tea as medicine (though the first use of tea as a stimulant is unknown). China is considered to have the earliest records of tea consumption, with possible records dating back to the 10th century BC. Note however that the current word for tea in Chinese only came into use in the 8th century AD, there are therefore uncertainties as to whether the older words used are the same as tea. The word tu 荼 appears in Shijing and other ancient texts to signify a kind of "bitter vegetable" (苦菜), and it is possible that it referred to several different plants, such as sow thistle, chicory, or smartweed, including tea. In the Chronicles of Huayang, it was recorded that the Ba people in Sichuan presented tu to the Zhou king. The state of Ba and its neighbour Shu were later conquered by the Qin, and according to the 17th century scholar Gu Yanwu who wrote in Ri Zhi Lu (日知錄): "It was after the Qin had taken Shu that they learned how to drink tea."

The first known reference to boiling tea came from the Han dynasty work "The Contract for a Youth" written by Wang Bao where, among the tasks listed to be undertaken by the youth, "he shall boil tea and fill the utensils" and "he shall buy tea at Wuyang". The first record of cultivation of tea also dated it to this period (Ganlu era of Emperor Xuan of Han) when tea was cultivated on Meng Mountain (蒙山) near Chengdu. From the Tang to the Qing dynasties, the first 360 leaves of tea grown here were picked each spring and presented to the emperor. Even today its green and yellow teas, such as the Mengding Ganlu tea, are still sought after.

An early credible record of tea drinking dates to 220 AD, in a medical text Shi Lun (食论) by Hua Tuo, who stated, "to drink bitter t'u constantly makes one think better." Another possible early reference to tea is found in a letter written by the Qin dynasty general Liu Kun. However, before the mid-8th century Tang dynasty, tea-drinking was primarily a southern Chinese practice. It became widely popular during the Tang dynasty, when it was spread to Korea, Japan, and Vietnam. During the Tang dynasty in China, tea was prepared differently than it is today. Instead of steeping tea leaves in hot water, the tea was boiled with various ingredients such as ginger, onions, and spices to create a savory broth. It was not until the Song dynasty that the practice of steeping tea leaves in hot water became popular.

Laozi, the classical Chinese philosopher, was said to describe tea as "the froth of the liquid jade" and named it an indispensable ingredient to the elixir of life. Legend has it that master Lao was saddened by society's moral decay, and sensing that the end of the dynasty was near, he journeyed westward to the unsettled territories, never to be seen again. While passing along the nation's border, he encountered and was offered tea by a customs inspector named Yin Hsi. Yin Hsi encouraged him to compile his teachings into a single book so that future generations might benefit from his wisdom. This became known as the Dao De Jing, a collection of Laozi's sayings.

Tang dynasty writer Lu Yu's (simplified Chinese: 陆羽; traditional Chinese: 陸羽; pinyin: lùyǔ) Cha Jing (The Classic of Tea) (simplified Chinese: 茶经; traditional Chinese: 茶經; pinyin: chá jīng) is an early work on the subject. According to Cha Jing, tea drinking was widespread. The book describes how tea plants were grown, the leaves processed, and tea prepared as a beverage. It also describes how tea was evaluated. The book also discusses where the best tea leaves were produced. Teas produced in this period were mainly tea bricks which were often used as currency, especially further from the center of the empire where coins lost their value. These were made by compressing tea leaves into a dense, round shape that was easy to transport and store. The cakes were valued based on their weight, and they could be traded for other goods or used to pay taxes.

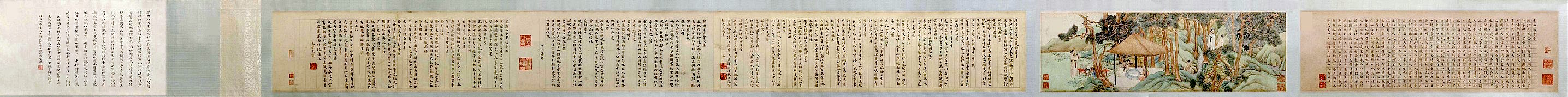
A Ming dynasty painting by artist Wen Zhengming illustrating scholars greeting in a tea party

During the Song dynasty, production and preparation of all tea changed. The tea included many loose-leaf styles (to preserve the delicate character favored by court society), and it is the origin of today's loose teas and the practice of brewed tea. A powdered form of tea also emerged. Steaming tea leaves was the primary process used for centuries in the preparation of tea. After the transition from compressed tea to the powdered form, the production of tea for trade and distribution changed once again.

Illustration of the legend of monkeys harvesting tea

The Chinese learned to process tea in a different way in the mid-13th century. Tea leaves were roasted and then crumbled rather than steamed. By the Yuan and Ming dynasties, unfermented tea leaves were first pan-fried, then rolled and dried. This stops the oxidation process which turns the leaves dark and allows tea to remain green. In the 15th century, oolong tea, where the tea leaves were allowed to partially ferment before pan-frying, was developed. Western taste, however, preferred the fully oxidized black tea, and the leaves were allowed to ferment further. Yellow tea was an accidental discovery in the production of green tea during the Ming dynasty, when apparently sloppy practices allowed the leaves to turn yellow, which yielded a different flavour as a result.

Tea production in China, historically, was a laborious process, conducted in distant and often poorly accessible regions. This led to the rise of many apocryphal stories and legends surrounding the harvesting process. For example, one story that has been told for many years is that of a village where monkeys pick tea. According to this legend, the villagers stand below the monkeys and taunt them. The monkeys, in turn, become angry, and grab handfuls of tea leaves and throw them at the villagers. There are products sold today that claim to be harvested in this manner, but no reliable commentators have observed this firsthand, and most doubt that it happened at all. For many hundreds of years the commercially used tea tree has been, in shape, more of a bush than a tree. "Monkey picked tea" is more likely a name of certain varieties than a description of how it was obtained.

In 1391, the Hongwu emperor issued a decree that only loose tea would be accepted as a "tribute". As a result, tea production shifted from cake tea to loose-leaf tea and processing techniques advanced, giving rise to the more energy efficient methods of pan-firing and sun-drying, which were popular in Jiangnan and Fujian respectively. The last group to adopt loose-leaf tea were the literati, who were reluctant to abandon their refined culture of whisking tea until the invention of oolong tea. By the end of the 16th century, loose-leaf tea had entirely replaced the earlier tradition of cake and powdered tea.

=== Japan ===
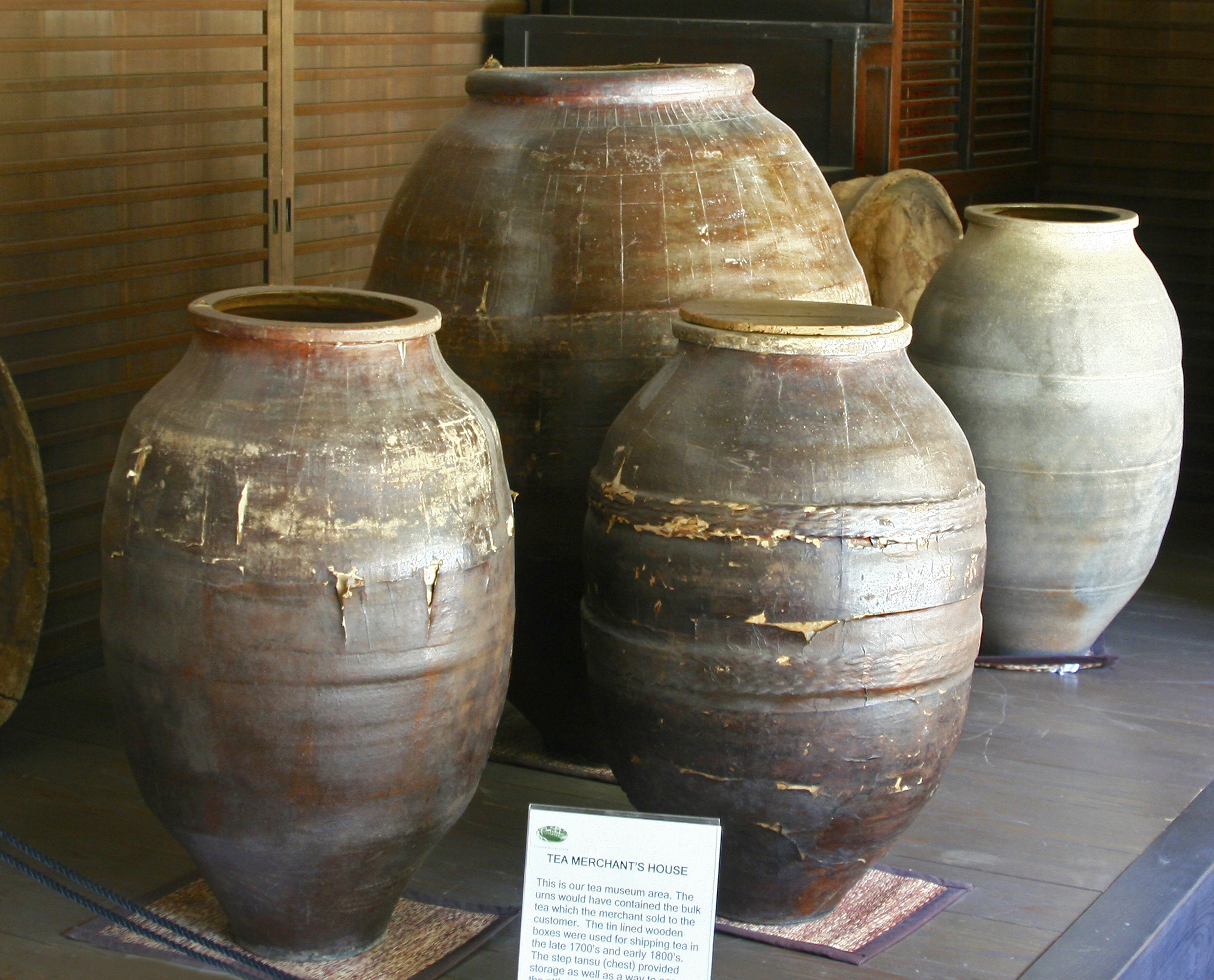
Ancient Tea Urns used by merchants to store tea

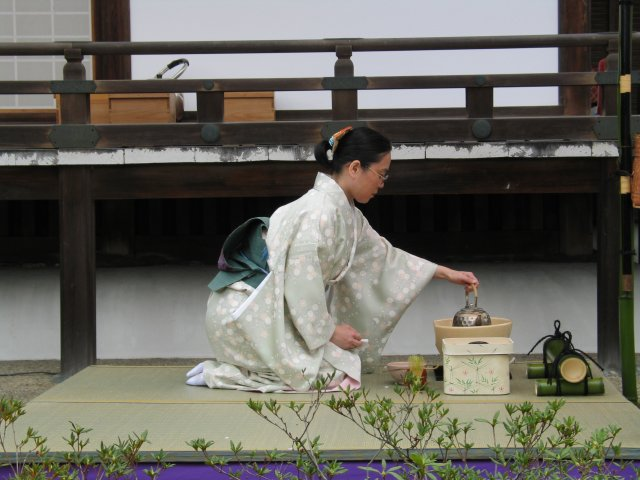
Japanese tea ceremony

During the Sui dynasty in China, tea was introduced to Japan by Buddhist monks. Tea use spread during the 6th century AD. Tea became a drink of the religious classes in Japan when Japanese priests and envoys, sent to China to learn about its culture, brought tea to Japan. Ancient recordings indicate the first batch of tea seeds were brought by a priest named Saichō (最澄) in 805 and then by another named Kūkai (空海) in 806. It became a drink of the royal classes when Emperor Saga (嵯峨天皇) encouraged the growth of tea plants. Seeds were imported from China, and cultivation in Japan began.

In 1191, Zen priest Eisai (栄西) introduced tea seeds to Kyoto. Some of the tea seeds were given to the priest Myoe Shonin, and became the basis for Uji tea. The oldest tea specialty book in Japan, Kissa Yōjōki (喫茶養生記; How to Stay Healthy by Drinking Tea), was written by Eisai. The two-volume book was written in 1211 after his second and last visit to China. The first sentence states, "Tea is the ultimate mental and medical remedy and has the ability to make one's life more full and complete." Eisai was also instrumental in introducing tea consumption to the warrior class, which rose to political prominence after the Heian period.

Green tea became a staple among cultured people in Japan—a brew for the gentry and the Buddhist priesthood alike. Production grew and tea became increasingly accessible, though still a privilege enjoyed mostly by the upper classes. The tea ceremony of Japan was introduced from China in the 15th century by Buddhists as a semi-religious social custom. The modern tea ceremony developed over several centuries by Zen Buddhist monks under the original guidance of the monk Sen no Rikyū (千 利休). In fact, both the beverage and the ceremony surrounding it played a prominent role in feudal diplomacy.

In 1738, Soen Nagatani developed Japanese sencha (煎茶), literally simmered tea, which is an unfermented form of green tea. It is the most popular form of tea in Japan today. The name can be confusing because sencha is no longer simmered. While sencha is currently prepared by steeping the leaves in hot water, this was not always the case. Sencha was originally prepared by casting the leaves into a cauldron and simmering briefly. The liquid would then be ladled into bowls and served. In 1835, Kahei Yamamoto developed gyokuro (玉露), literally jewel dew, by shading tea trees during the weeks leading up to harvesting. By the 20th century, machine manufacturing of green tea was introduced and began replacing handmade tea.

=== Korea ===
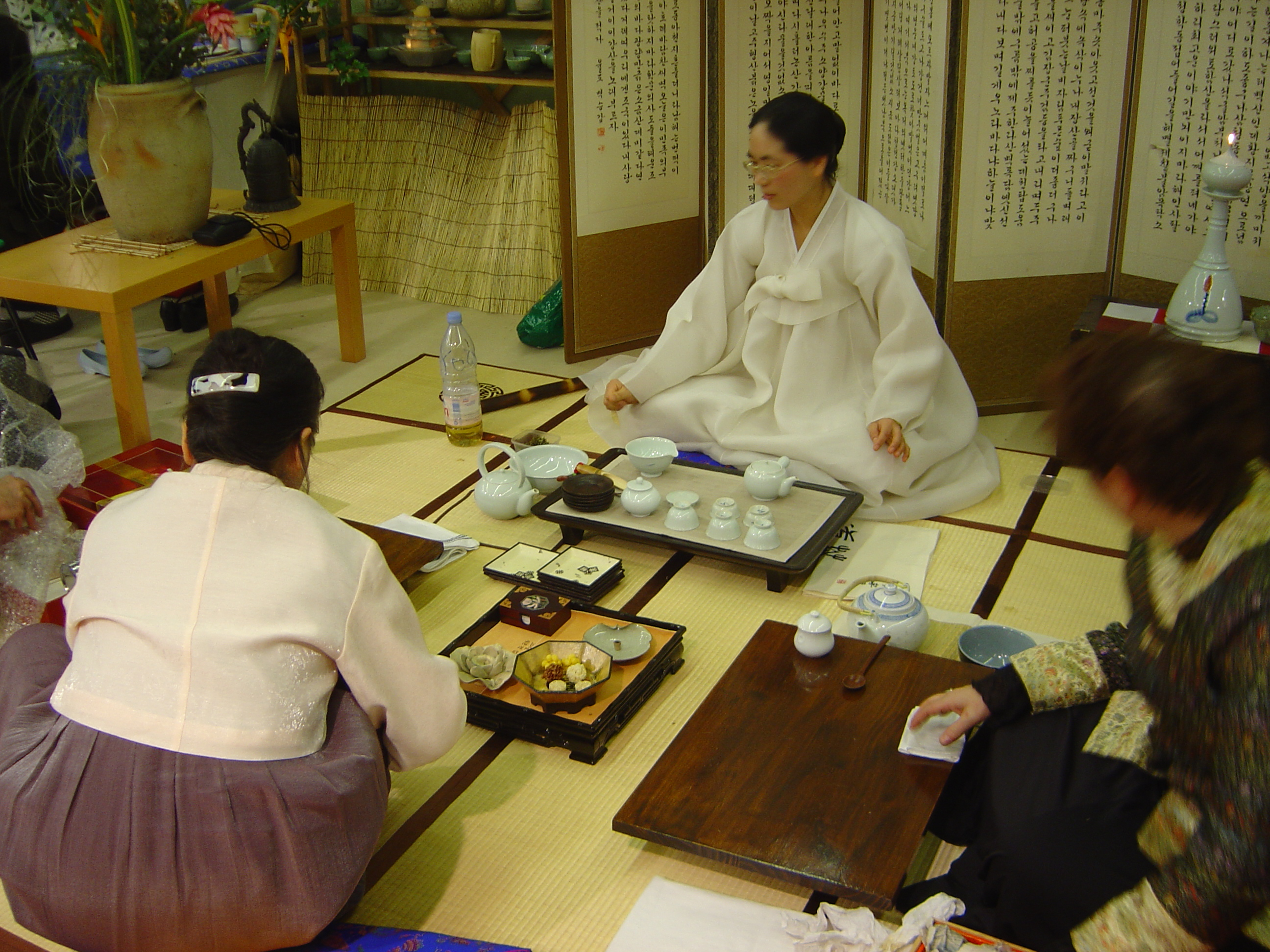
Darye, Korean tea ceremony

The first historical record documenting the offering of tea to an ancestral god describes a rite in 661 AD in which a tea offering was made to the spirit of King Suro, the founder of the Geumgwan Gaya Kingdom. Records from the Goryeo dynasty (918–1392) show that tea offerings were made in Buddhist temples to the spirits of revered monks. During the Joseon dynasty (1392–1910), the royal Yi family and the aristocracy used tea for simple rites. The "Day Tea Rite" was a common daytime ceremony, whereas the "Special Tea Rite" was reserved for specific occasions. Toward the end of the Joseon dynasty, commoners joined the trend and used tea for ancestral rites, following the Chinese example based on Zhu Xi's text formalities of family.

Stoneware was common, ceramic more frequent, mostly made in provincial kilns, with porcelain rare, imperial porcelain with dragons the rarest. The earliest kinds of tea used in tea ceremonies were heavily pressed cakes of black tea, the equivalent of aged pu-erh tea in China. However, importation of tea plants by Buddhist monks brought a more delicate series of teas into Korea, and the tea ceremony. Green tea, "Jakseol (작설, 雀舌)" or "Jungno (죽로, 竹露)", is most often served. However, other teas such as "Byeoksoryeong (벽소령, 碧宵嶺)" Cheonhachun (천하춘, 天下春), Ujeon (우전, 雨前), Okcheon (옥천, 玉泉), as well as native chrysanthemum tea, persimmon leaf tea, or mugwort tea, may be served at different times of the year.

== Global expansion ==
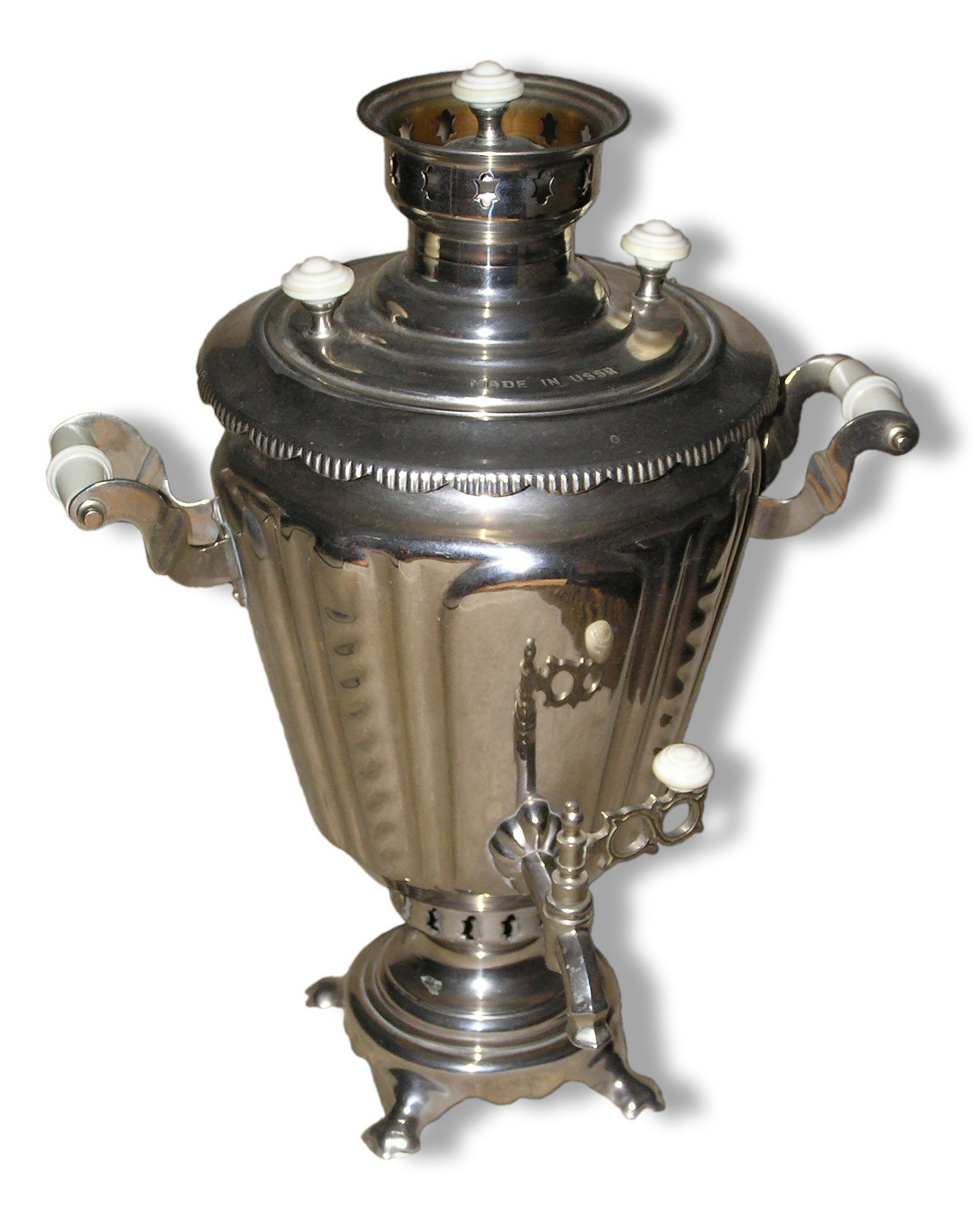
A conical urn-shaped silver-plated samovar used for boiling water for tea in Russia and some Middle eastern countries

The earliest record of tea in a more occidental writing is said to be found in the statement of an Arabian traveler, that after 879 the main sources of revenue in Canton were the duties on salt and tea. Marco Polo records the deposition of a Chinese minister of finance in 1285 for his arbitrary augmentation of the tea taxes. In 1557, Portugal established a trading port in Macau, and word of the Chinese drink "chá" spread quickly, but there is no mention of them bringing any samples home. In the early 17th century, a ship of the Dutch East India Company brought the first green tea leaves to Amsterdam from China. Tea was known in France by 1636. It enjoyed a brief period of popularity in Paris around 1648. The history of tea in Russia can also be traced back to the 17th century. Tea was first offered by China as a gift to Czar Michael I in 1618. The Russian ambassador tried the drink; he did not care for it and rejected the offer, delaying tea's Russian introduction by fifty years. By 1689, tea was regularly imported from China to Russia via a caravan of hundreds of camels traveling the year-long journey, making it a precious commodity at the time. Tea was appearing in German apothecaries by 1657 but never gained much esteem except in coastal areas such as Ostfriesland. Tea first appeared publicly in mainland Britain during the 1650s, where it was introduced through coffeehouses. From there it was introduced to British colonies in America and elsewhere.

Tea taxation was a large issue; in Britain tea smuggling thrived until the repeal of tea's tax in 1785. In Holland, tea drinkers had to pay for an annual license per person.

=== Portugal and Italy ===
Tea was first introduced to Europe by Italian traveler Giovanni Battista Ramusio, who in 1555 published Voyages and Travels, containing the first European reference to tea, which he calls "Chai Catai"; his accounts were based on second-hand reports in the polities of the Gulf of Aden; Yemen and Somalia.

Portuguese priests and merchants in the 16th century made their first contact with tea in China, at which time it was termed chá. The first Portuguese ships reached China in 1516, and in 1560 Portuguese missionary Gaspar da Cruz published the first Portuguese account of Chinese tea; in 1565 Portuguese missionary Louis Almeida published the first European account of tea in Japan.

=== India ===
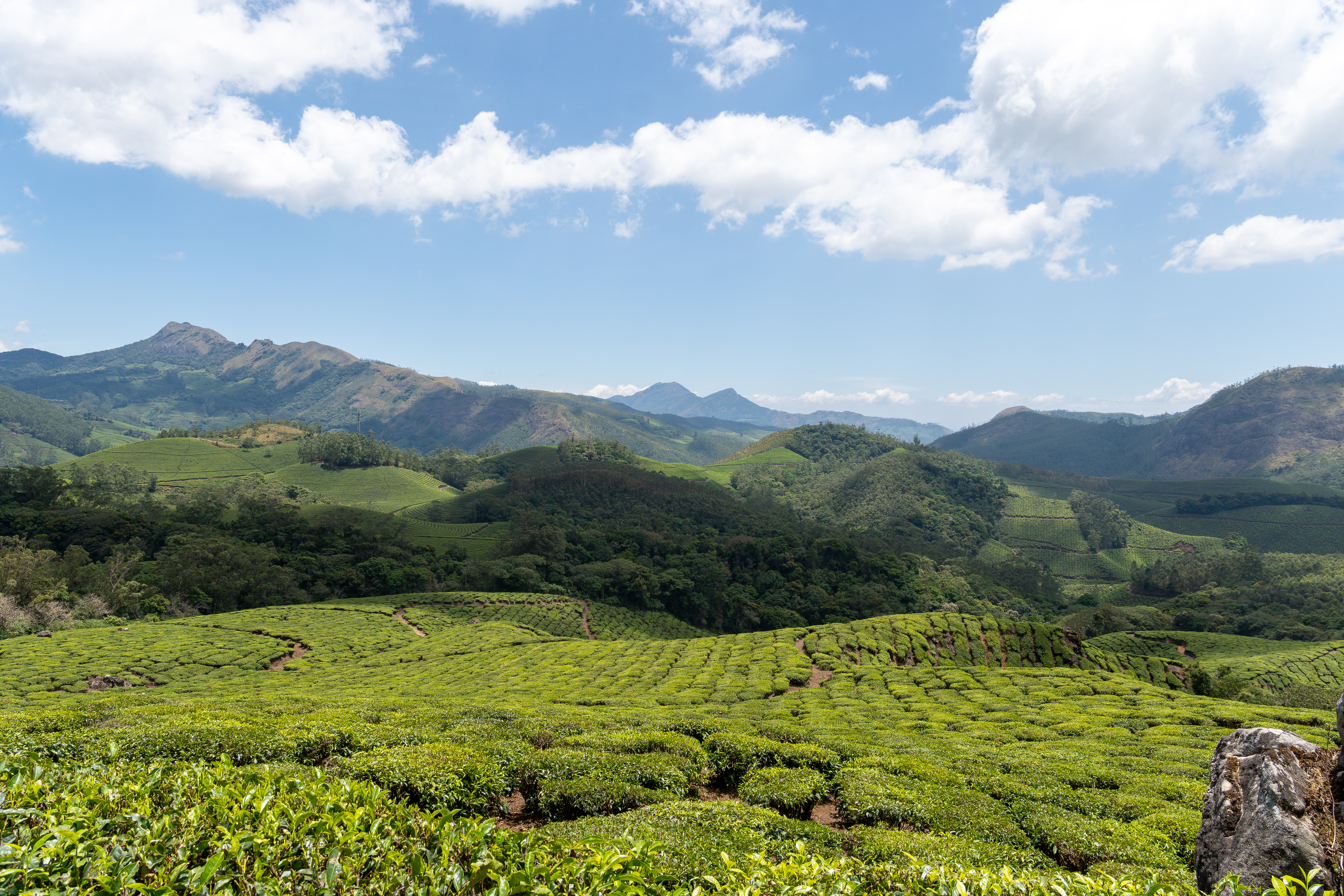
A view of tea plantations near Eravikulam National Park in Kerala, India

Commercial production of tea was first introduced into India by the British, in an attempt to break the Chinese monopoly on tea. The British, using Chinese seeds, plus Chinese planting and cultivating techniques, launched a tea industry by offering land in Assam to any European who agreed to cultivate tea for export. Tea was originally only consumed by Anglicized Indians; it was not until the 1950s that tea grew widely popular in India through a successful advertising campaign by the India Tea Board. Prior to the British, the plant may have been used for medicinal purposes. Some cite the Sanjeevani plant as the first recorded reference of tea use in India. However, scientific studies have shown that the Sanjeevani plant is in fact a different plant and is not related to tea. In Assam, there is evidence of pre-modern medicinal use of tea among the Singpho and Khamti tribes. However, commercial production of tea in India did not begin until the arrival of the British East India Company, at which point large tracts of land were converted for mass tea production.

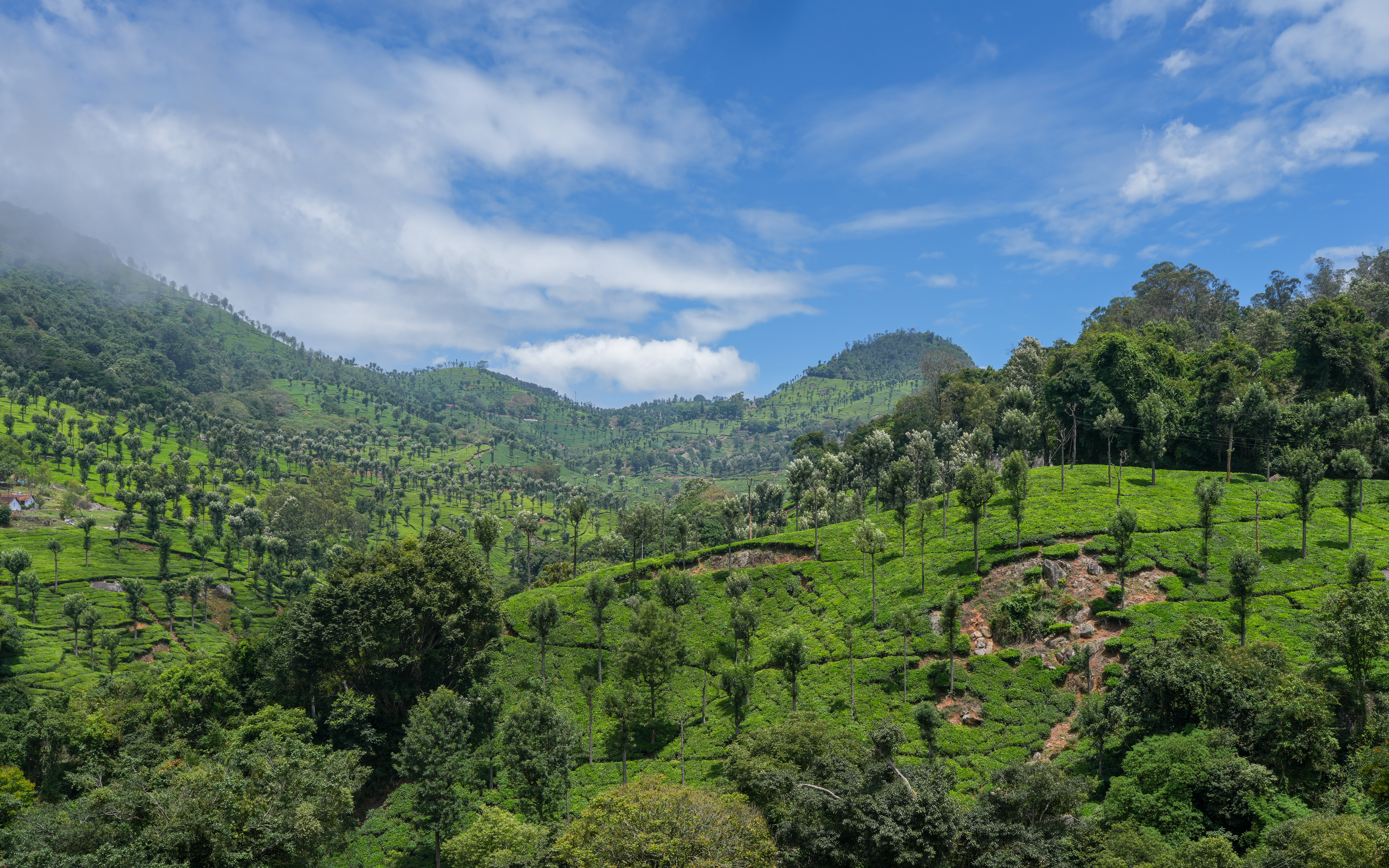
Tea plantations in the Nilgiris of Tamil Nadu in southern India

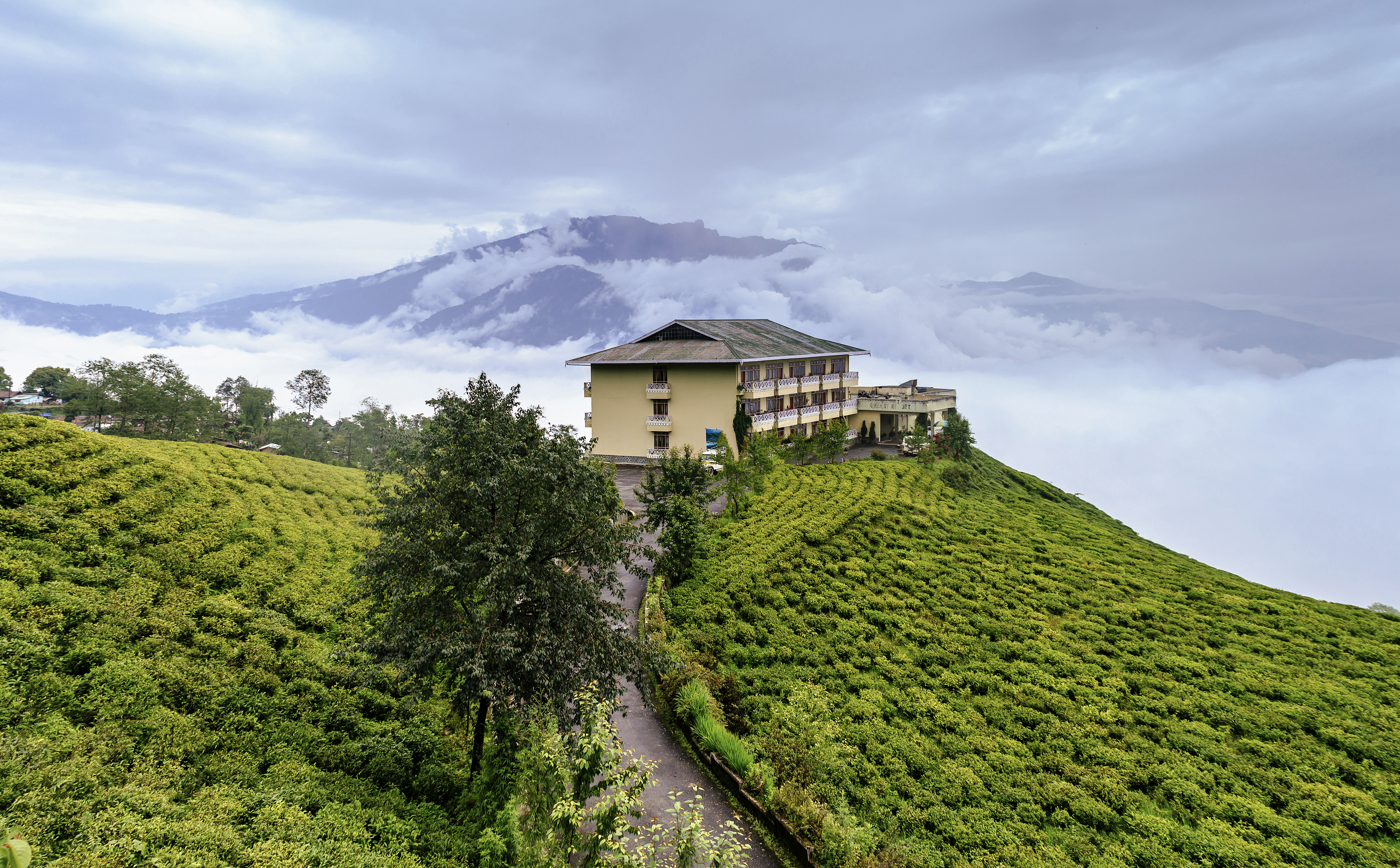
Tea garden in the lower Himalayas of Sikkim in northeast India

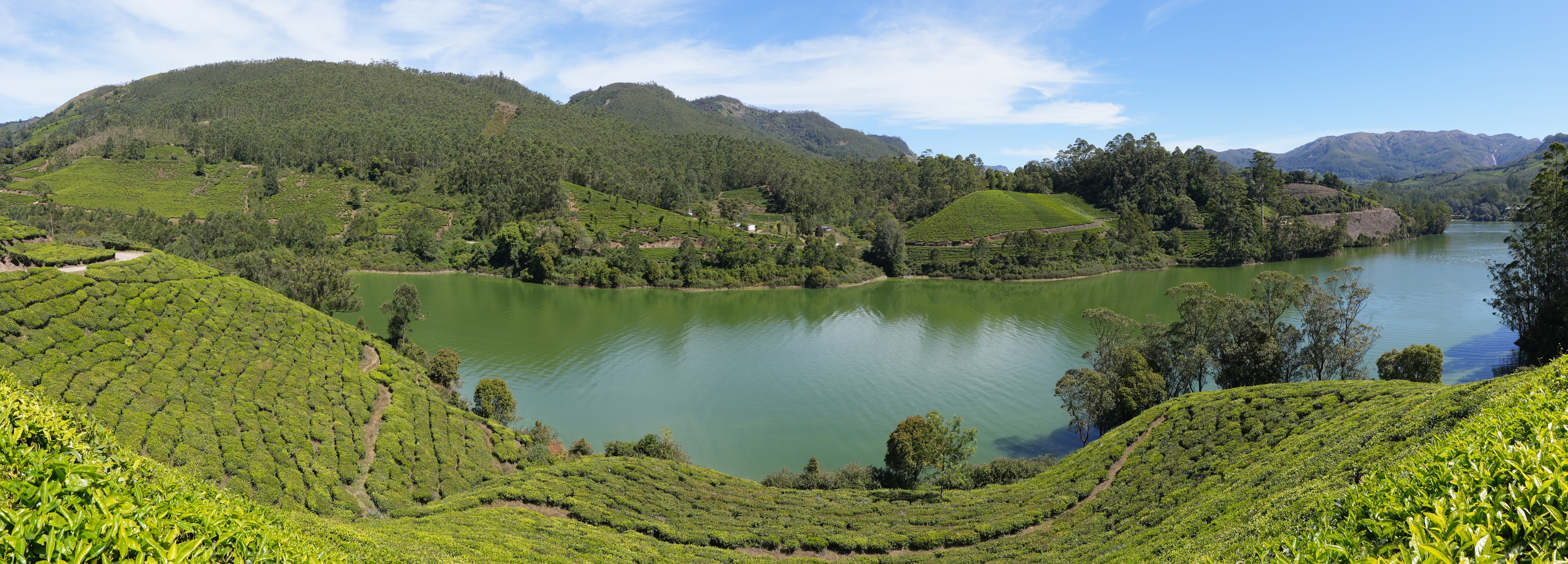
Panoramic view of tea plantations around Mattupetty Lake in Kerala, India

The Chinese variety is used for Sikkim, Darjeeling tea, and Kangra tea, while the Assam variety, clonal to the native to Assam, was used everywhere else. The British started commercial tea plantations in India and in Ceylon: "In 1824 tea plants were discovered in the hills along the frontier between Burma and Assam. The British introduced tea culture into India in 1836 and into Ceylon (Sri Lanka) in 1867. At first they used seeds from China, but later seeds from the clonal Assam plant were used." Only black tea was produced until recent decades mostly in India, except in Kangra (present-day Himachal Pradesh) which produced green tea for exporting to central Asia, Afghanistan and neighboring countries.

India was the top producer of tea for nearly a century but was displaced by China as the top tea producer in the 21st century. Indian tea companies have acquired a number of iconic foreign tea enterprises including British brand Tetley. Most of the Indian tea garden owners have focused on exports to markets like Europe and Russia, while very few have focused on building their own brands such as Makaibari, Dharmsala Tea Company, and a few others. While India is the largest consumer of tea worldwide, the per-capita consumption of tea in India remains a modest 750 grams per person annually. Recently consumption of green tea has seen a great upsurge across the cities, and regions such as Kangra which were known for their green tea production historically, have seen a resurgence of their green teas in the domestic market.

=== Iran ===
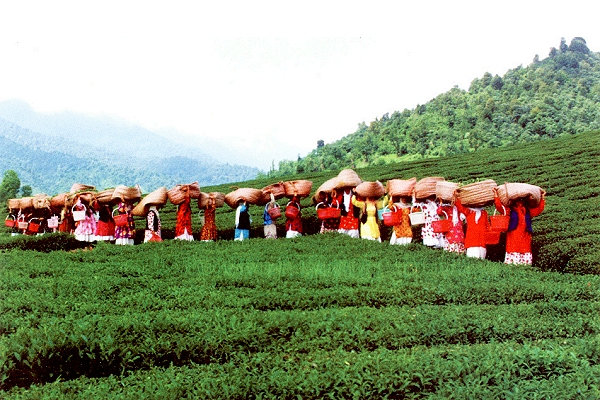
Tea harvest in Lahijan, Iran

Gilan in north of Iran is main production center of Iranian tea. Historically, Lahijan is the first town in Iran to have tea plantations. With its mild weather, soil quality and fresh spring water, Lahijan stands to have the largest area of tea cultivation in Iran. "Lahijan Spring Tea" is the best quality tea produced in the country. Tea is cultivated at other cities of Gilan, for example Fuman and Roudsar.

=== Taiwan ===
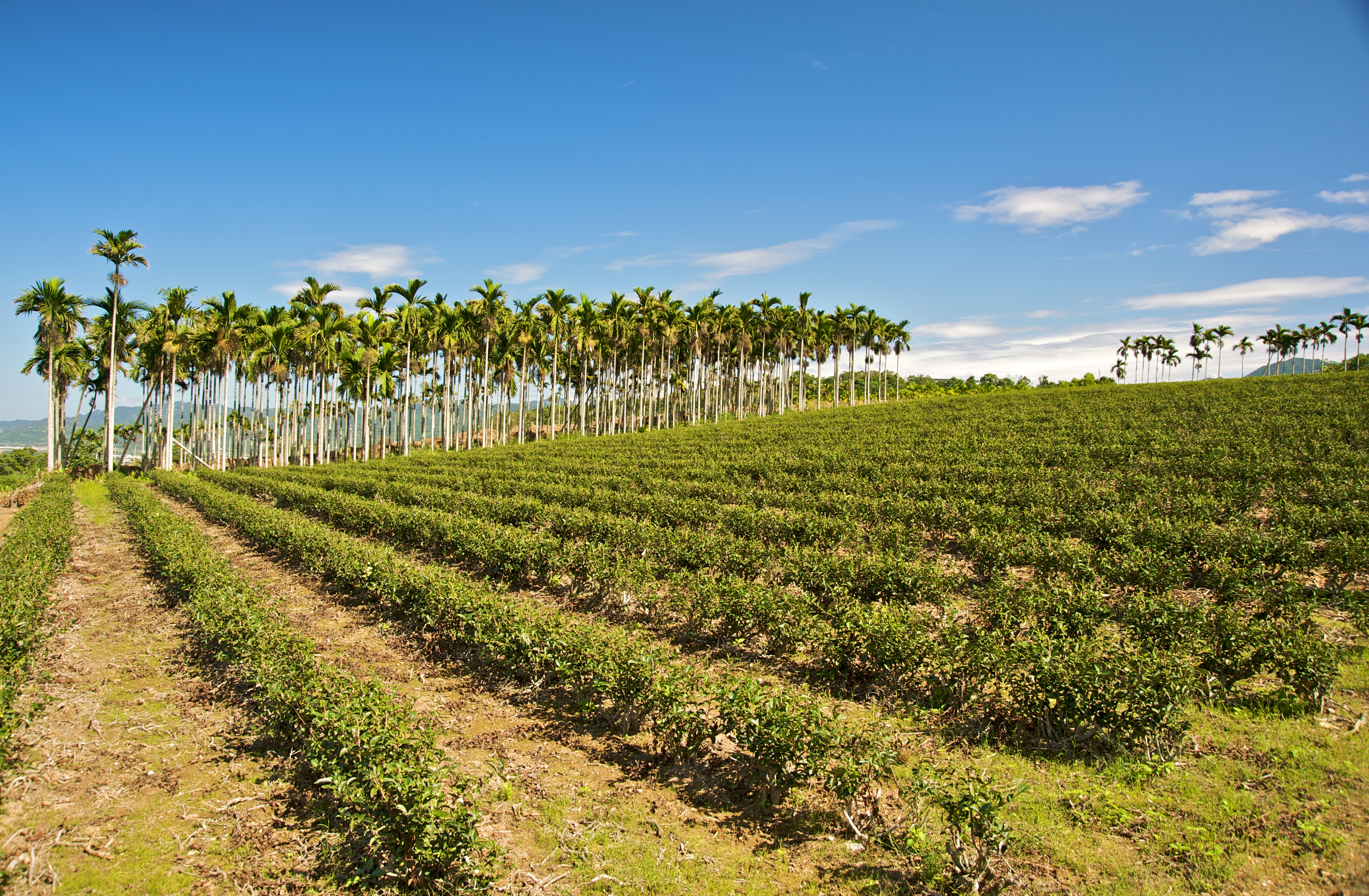
Tea plantation in Taiwan

Taiwan is famous for the making of oolong tea and green tea, as well as many western-styled teas. Bubble tea or "Zhen Zhu Nai Cha" (Mandarin: 珍珠奶茶) is black tea mixed with sweetened condensed milk and tapioca. Since the island was known to Westerners for many centuries as Formosa—short for the Portuguese Ilha Formosa, or "beautiful island"—tea grown in Taiwan is often identified by that name.

=== United Kingdom ===
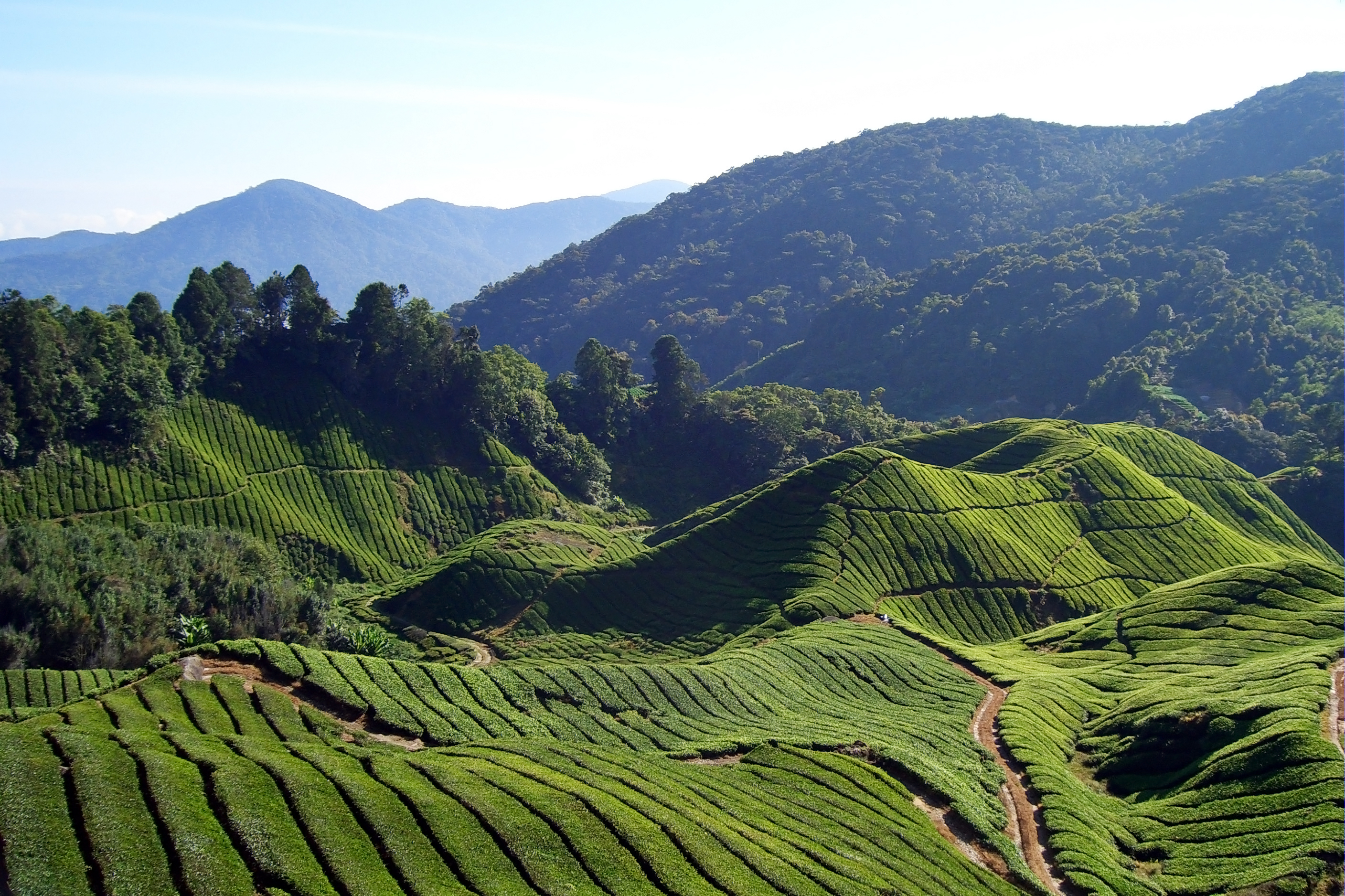
Tea plantation in the Cameron Highlands, Malaysia

The first record of tea in English came from a letter written by Richard Wickham, who ran an East India Company office in Japan, writing to a merchant in Macao requesting "the best sort of chaw" in 1615. Peter Mundy, a traveller and merchant who came across tea in Fuji in 1637, wrote, "chaa—only water with a kind of herb boiled in it". In 1657, Thomas Garway, a "tobacconist and coffee-man" was the first to sell tea in London at his house in Exchange Alley, charging between 16 and 50 shillings per pound. The same year, tea was listed as an item in the price list in a London coffee house, and the first advertisement for tea appeared in 1658. In 1660 Samuel Pepys recorded in his diary: "I did send for a cup of tee (a China drink) of which I never had drank before." It is probable that early imports were smuggled via Amsterdam or through sailors arriving on eastern boats. The marriage of King Charles II in 1662 to the Portuguese princess Catherine of Braganza brought the tea drinking habit to court. Official trade of tea began in 1664 with an import of only two pound two ounces for presentation to the king, which grew to 24 million pounds per year by 1801.

Regular trade began in Canton (now Guangzhou), where it was controlled by two monopolies: the Chinese Cohong (trading companies) and the British East India Company. The Cohong acquired tea from 'tea men' who had an elaborate supply chain into the mountains and provinces where tea grew. The East India Company brought back many products, of which tea was just one, which proved one of the most successful. It was initially promoted as a medicinal beverage or tonic but by the end of the 17th century was taken as an all-purpose drink, albeit mainly by the elite, as it was expensive. Tea was traded in significant amounts by the 18th century, when tea was being sold by grocers and tea shops in London. By the 1720s black tea overtook green tea in popularity as the price dropped, and early on British drinkers began adding sugar and milk to tea, a practice that was not done in China. By the 1720s European maritime trade with China was dominated by exchange of silver for tea. As prices continued to drop, tea became increasingly popular and by 1750 had become the British national drink. A fungus reduced coffee production in Ceylon by 95% in the 19th century, cementing tea's popularity. The escalation of tea importation and sales over the period 1690 to 1750 is mirrored closely by the increase in importation and sales of cane sugar: the British were not drinking just tea but sweet tea. Thus, two of Britain's trading triangles converged: the sugar sourced from Britain's trading triangle encompassing Britain, Africa and the West Indies and the tea from the triangle encompassing Britain, India and China.

In China, the Qing dynasty Qianlong Emperor wrote to King George III in response to the Macartney Mission's request for trade in 1793: "Our Celestial Empire possesses all things in prolific abundance and lacks no product within its borders. There is therefore no need to import the manufactures of outside barbarians in exchange for our own produce." Tea had to be paid in silver bullion, and to generate the silver, Britain began supplying opium from the traditional growing regions of British India (in present-day Pakistan and Afghanistan) for smuggling into China. Although opium use in China had a long history as medicine, but the new practice of smoking increased demand. Imports increased fivefold between 1821 and 1837. The Qing government attitudes hardened because of the fiscal and social problems opium created and the court took serious measures to curtail importation of opium in 1838–39. Tea had become an important source of tax revenue for the British Empire, and the banning of the opium trade and thus the creation of funding issues for tea importers was one of the main causes of the First Opium War.

As an attempt to circumvent its dependence on Chinese tea, the East India Company sent Scottish botanist Robert Fortune to China to purchase and bring out of China tea plants, which were then taken to India. With the exception of a few plants which survived in established Indian gardens, most of the Chinese tea plants Fortune introduced in the north-western provinces of India perished. Due to the British preference and fashion for a strong dark tea brew, which was discovered to be best made from the native varieties of tea plant in India Assam subspecies (Camellia sinensis var. assamica), it proved more important for the development of production there. However the technology and knowledge that was brought from China was instrumental in the later flourishing of the Indian tea industry in Assam and Sri Lanka. From 1940 to 1952 tea was rationed but coffee was exempted.

=== The Americas ===
The drinking of tea in the United States was largely influenced by the passage of the Tea Act and its subsequent protest during the American Revolution. Tea consumption sharply decreased in America during and after the Revolution, when many Americans switched from drinking tea to drinking coffee, considering tea drinking to be unpatriotic. The American specialty tea market quadrupled in the years from 1993 to 2008, now being worth $6.8 billion a year. Specialty tea houses and retailers also started to pop up during this period.

Canadians were big tea drinkers from the days of British colonisation until the Second World War, when they began drinking more coffee like their American neighbors to the south. During the 1990s, Canadians begun to purchase more specialty teas instead of coffee.

In South America, the tea production in Brazil has strong roots because of the country's origins in Portugal, the strong presence of Japanese immigrants, and because of the influences of Argentina's yerba mate culture. Brazil had a big tea production until the 1980s, but it has weakened in the past decades.

=== Australia ===
The Aboriginal Australians drank an infusion from the plant species leptospermum. Upon reaching Australia, Captain Cook noticed the aboriginal peoples drinking it and called it tea. Today the plant is referred to as the "ti tree".

Through colonisation by the British, tea was introduced to Australia. In fact, tea was aboard the First Fleet in 1788. In 1884, the Cutten brothers established the first commercial tea plantation in Australia in Bingil Bay in northern Queensland Nerada Tea. In 1883, Alfred Bushell opened the first tea shop in Australia in Queensland. In 1899, Bushell's sons moved the enterprise to Sydney and began selling tea commercially, founding Australia's first commercial tea seller Bushell's Company.

In 2000, Australia consumed 14,000 tonnes of tea annually. Tea production in Australia remains very small and is primarily in northern New South Wales and Queensland. Most tea produced in Australia is black tea, although there are small quantities of green tea produced in the Alpine Valleys region of Victoria.

=== Sri Lanka ===
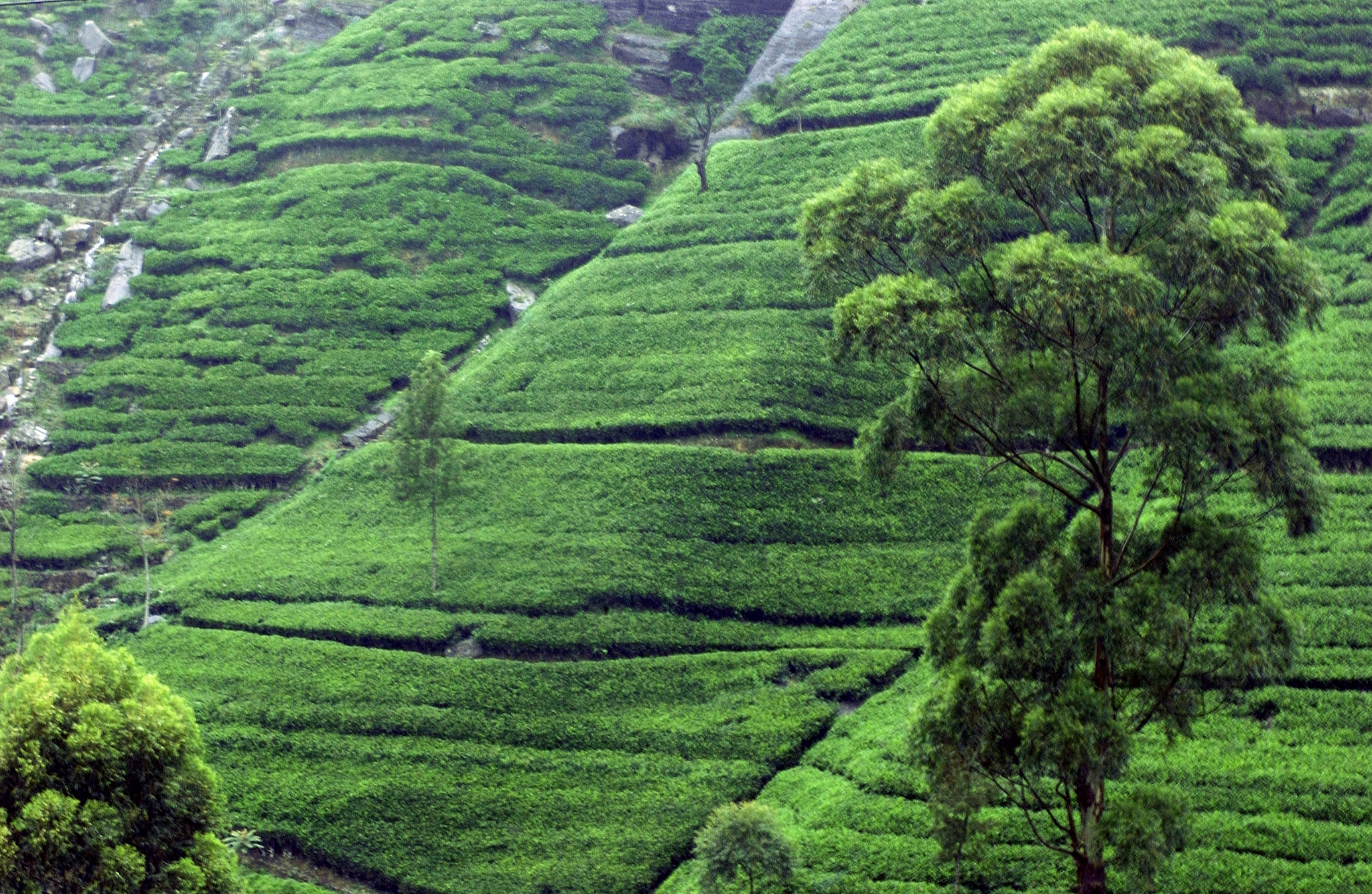
Tea garden in Sri Lanka

Sri Lanka is renowned for its high quality tea and as the fourth biggest tea producing country globally, after China, India and Kenya, and has a production share of 9% in the international sphere. The total extent of land under tea cultivation has been assessed at approximately 187,309 hectares. The plantations started by the British were initially taken over by the government in the 1960s but have been privatized and are now run by plantation companies which own a few estates or tea plantations each. Ceylon tea is divided into 3 groups as Upcountry, Mid country and Low country tea based on the geography of the land on which it is grown.

=== Africa ===
The Somali Ajuran empire which established bilateral trading ties with Ming dynasty China in the 13th century brought with them a myriad of commodities including tea. Africa has seen greatly increased tea production in recent decades, the great majority for export to Europe and North America respectively, produced on large estates, often owned by tea companies from the export markets. Almost all production is of basic mass-market teas, processed by the crush, tear, curl method.

== See also ==
- Tea classics
- Tea culture
