= Cha Pu =

1440 written work by Zhu Quan

The Cha Pu (Chinese: 茶谱; pinyin: Chápǔ; lit. 'Tea Manual') is a short work written in 1440 by Zhu Quan, the Prince of Ning, the 17th son of the Hongwu Emperor of the Ming dynasty, and relates the methods of tea preparation and degustation. It is considered by some to be a milestone in Chinese tea culture.

Following the Hongwu Emperor's ban on manufacturing of tea cake, Zhu Quan advocated a simpler way of steeping loose tea, a radical departure from the involved tea cake preparation methods of the Tang and Song dynasties, thus pioneered a new era in Chinese tea culture. There is also a short discussion of tea wares.

== Content ==
The Tea Manual includes a preface and sixteen chapters:

- Preface
1. Selecting Tea (品茶)
2. Storing Tea (收茶)
3. Whisking Tea (點茶)
4. Scenting Tea Method (熏香茶法)
5. Tea Brazier (茶爐)
6. Tea Stove (茶竈)
7. Tea Mill (茶磨)
8. Crushing Roller (茶碾)
9. Tea Sieve (茶羅)
10. Tea Stand (茶架)
11. Tea Spoon (茶匙)
12. Tea Whisk (茶筅)
13. Tea Cup (茶甌)
14. Tea Pitcher (茶瓶)
15. Water Heating Method (煎湯法)
16. Selecting Water (品水)

== Tea wares of the Ming dynasty ==
Some of the tea wares can be derived from the tea wares of the Tang dynasty (The Classic of Tea by Lu Yu) and Song dynasty (Old Man Shen-an).

== See also ==
- The Classic of Tea (Tang dynasty)
- Pictorial of Tea Ware (Song dynasty)
