= Zsolt Tokaji =

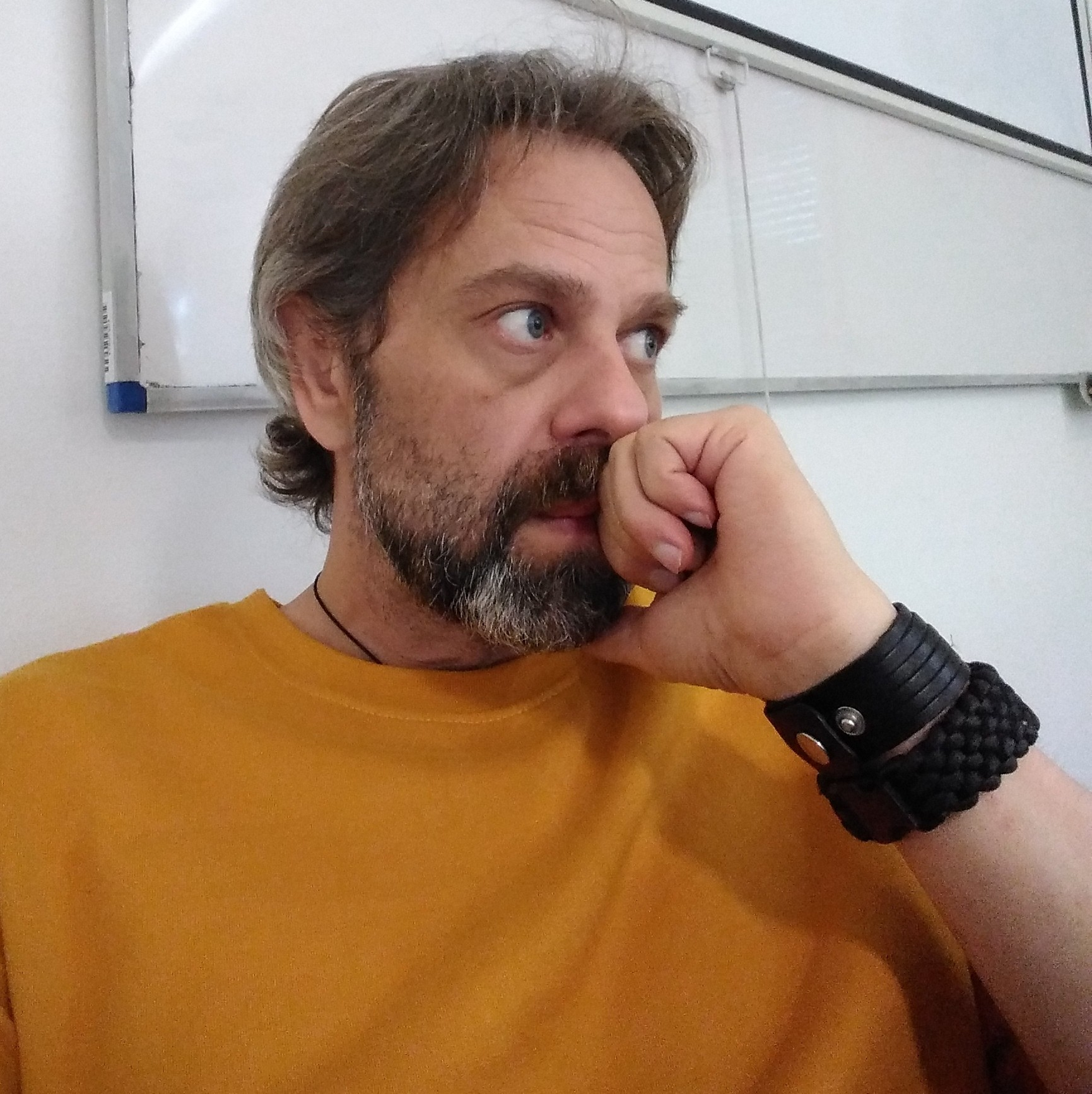
- Tokaji in 2019
- Born: 25 March 1971 (age 55); Debrecen, Hungary
- Education: Eötvös Loránd University (M.A.) Károli Gáspár University of the Reformed Church in Hungary (Ph.D.)
- Occupations: writer, translator, sinologist
- Years active: present

Zsolt Tokaji (simplified Chinese: 陶凯; traditional Chinese: 陶凱; pinyin: Táo Kǎi: Wade–Giles: T'ao K'ai; born 25 March 1971 in Debrecen (Hungary) is a Hungarian writer, sinologist and translator chiefly known for translating many classic and early Chinese texts into Hungarian, most famously the Inner Canon of Huangdi.

== Biography ==
Zsolt Tokaji received his MA degree from Eötvös Loránd University in 1999, (Chinese and Tibetan studies).

== Translations ==
- Szun mester: A' hadakozás regulái (1997) ISBN 963 85631 8 4
- Pu Szung-ling: A templom démona (1997) ISBN 963 85631 3 3
- Wu Qi: Beszélgetések a hadviselésről (1999) ISBN 963 9147 09 5
- Liu Csang: Csung Kuj, az ördögűző (1999) ISBN 963 9147 16 8
- Szun Pin: A háború művészete (2003) ISBN 963 9344 63 X
- Lu Jü: Teáskönyv (2005) ISBN 963 9147 69 9
- Guo Pu: Temetkezések könyve (2011) ISBN 978 963 329 457 4
- Tai Gong hat titkos tanítása (2011) ISBN 978 963 329 482 6
- Zhang Qiande: Aranyhal-jegyzetek (2011) ISBN 978 963 329 563 2
- A Sárga Császár belső könyvei – Egyszerű kérdések (2011) ISBN 978 963 329 189 4
- A Sárga Császár belső könyvei – Szellemi tengely (2012) ISBN 978 963 344 054 4
- A Sárga Császár nyolcvanegy nehéz kérdésének könyve (2012) ISBN 978 963 344 063 6
- Wenzi: A titkok feltárásának igaz könyve (2013) ISBN 978 963 366 615 9
- Song Ci: Egy kínai halottkém feljegyzései (2013) ISBN 978 963 366 618 0

== See also ==
- List of Sinologists
