= Southern Record =

Southern Record (南方録, Nanpōroku) is a purported book of secrets describing the teachings of the tea saint, Sen no Rikyū.

After the death of Rikyu, the book was lost with its author, Nanbo Sokei, a Zen priest and Rikyu's leading disciple. About one hundred years later, in 1686, Tachibana Jitsuzan, the chief vassal of the Kuroda clan purportedly happened to find the book while heading to Edo with his lord. Tachibana set about the task of transcribing the work into five volumes, adding two further volumes when more documents came to light. He then made a fair copy of the seven volumes, and the book was named Southern Record for the first time. The collection was highly regarded as a direct record of Rikyu's teachings and exerted a great influence on the process of the concept building of wabi-cha. However, modern researchers believe that the book contains information not from Sen no Rikyū and regard it as a forgery.

== Chapters ==
First Scroll: Memorandum 巻一 覚書
Second Scroll: Gatherings 巻二 会
Third Scroll: Shelves 巻三 棚
Fourth Scroll: Schools 巻四 書院
Fifth Scroll: Tables 巻五 台子
Sixth Scroll: Citations 巻六 墨引
Seventh Scroll: Memoirs 巻七 滅後

== Outline ==
There are two opinions regarding the origin of the book's name. The first holds that it derived from the opening passage of the work by the Chinese writer, Lu Yu, entitled Chá Ching (Cha-kyo in Japanese, The Classic of Tea or Tea Classic in English), in which he writes "Tea is a good tree in the south". The alternative view asserts that it came from the name of the original author, Nanbo Sokei.
