= Daming Temple =

Buddhist temple in Yangzhou, China

- 大明寺
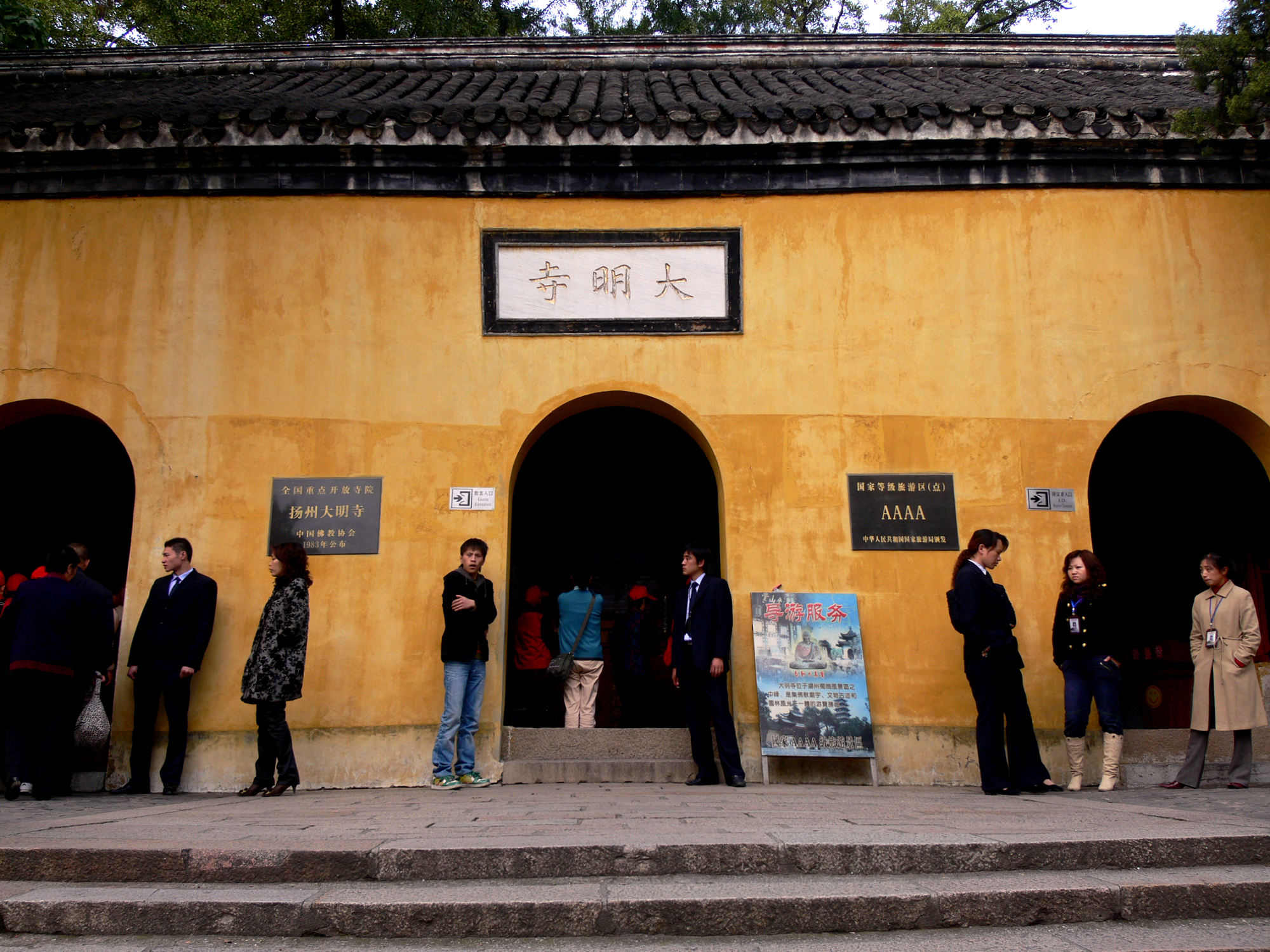
- Daming Temple

- Location in Jiangsu Location in China

Religion
- Affiliation: Buddhism

Location
- Location: Yangzhou, Jiangsu
- Country: China
- Interactive map of Daming Temple
- Coordinates: 32°25′18″N 119°24′30″E

Architecture
- Style: Chinese architecture
- Established: 457-464

Daming Temple (Chinese: 大明寺; pinyin: Dàmíng Sì) is a temple located at the middle peak of Shugang Mountain (蜀冈山), Yangzhou, Jiangsu province, China. This temple is known for a famous monk, Jianzhen, who studied the sutras and initiated people into monkhood here in 742 AD before he left for Japan.

== History ==
Daming Temple is so named because it was constructed during the periods in the reign of Xiaowu Emperor of the Liu Song dynasty during the period of Daming (453–464 AD). In the first year of Renshou in the Sui dynasty (601), Emperor Wen Yang Jian issued an edict to build 30 pagodas across the country for the worship of Buddhist relics (佛骨) to celebrate his birthday. So the Qi Ling Tower was built in this temple. The magnificent tower had nine floors and was known as "China's most magnificent and special architecture", so the temple was also called "Qi Ling Temple".

During the periods of the Wuzong reign of the Tang dynasty (618–907), it was called Qiling Temple.

In the Qing dynasty (1644–1911), due to social taboo of "Daming" (Daming Chinese: 大明 means Ming dynasty), its name was changed into "Qiling Temple" (栖灵寺). In 1765, during the 30th year of Qianlong period (1736–1795), Qianlong Emperor honored the name "Fajing Temple" (法净寺).

In 1922, Japanese scholar Tokiwa Daijo (常盘大定) built a pavilion, a gallery and a memorial hall before Daming Temple to commemorate master Jianzhen.

In 1973, Jianzhen Memorial Hall, designed by Liang Sicheng, was constructed.

In 1980, the temple reverted to its former name of "Daming Temple".

== Architecture ==
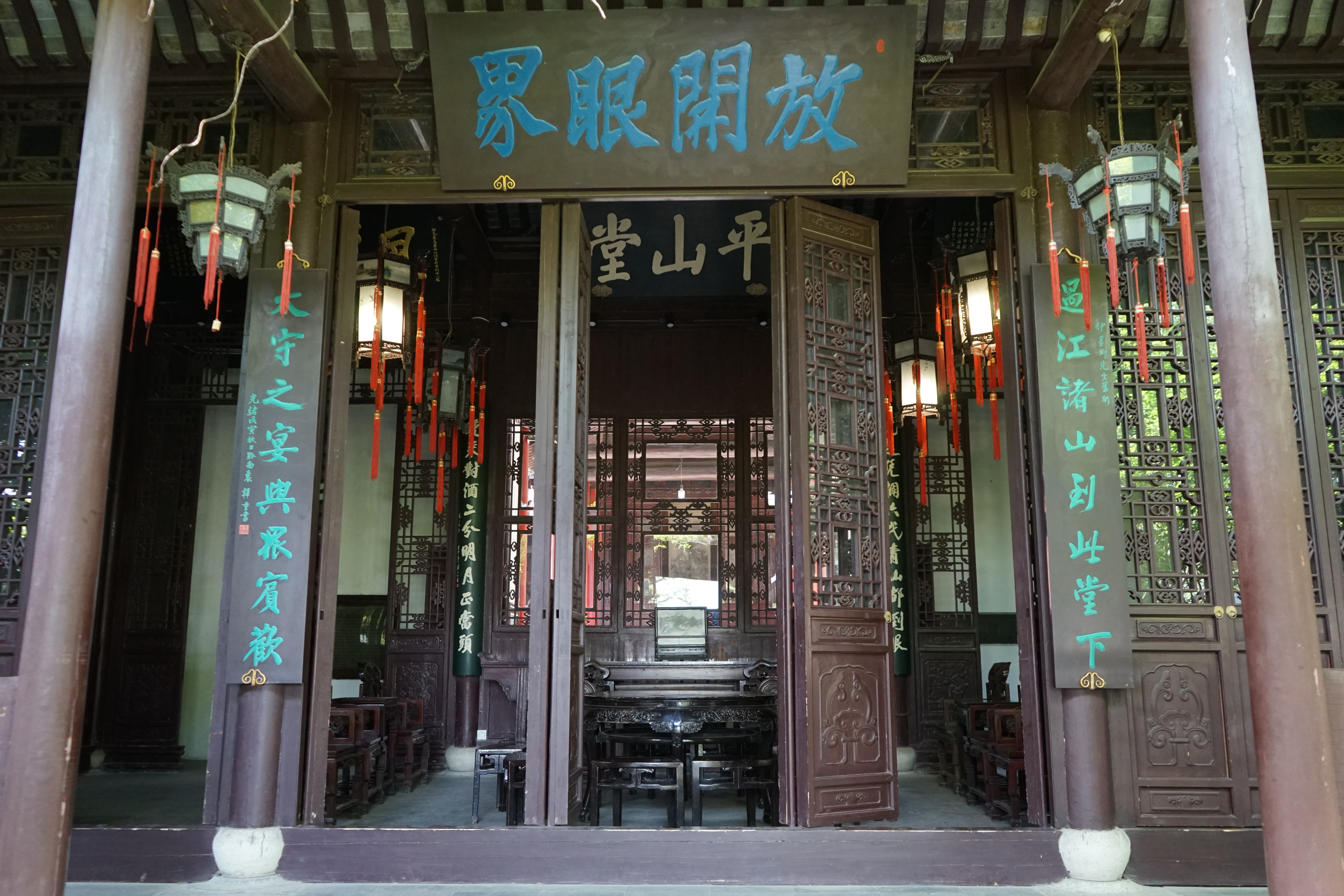
Pingshan Hall

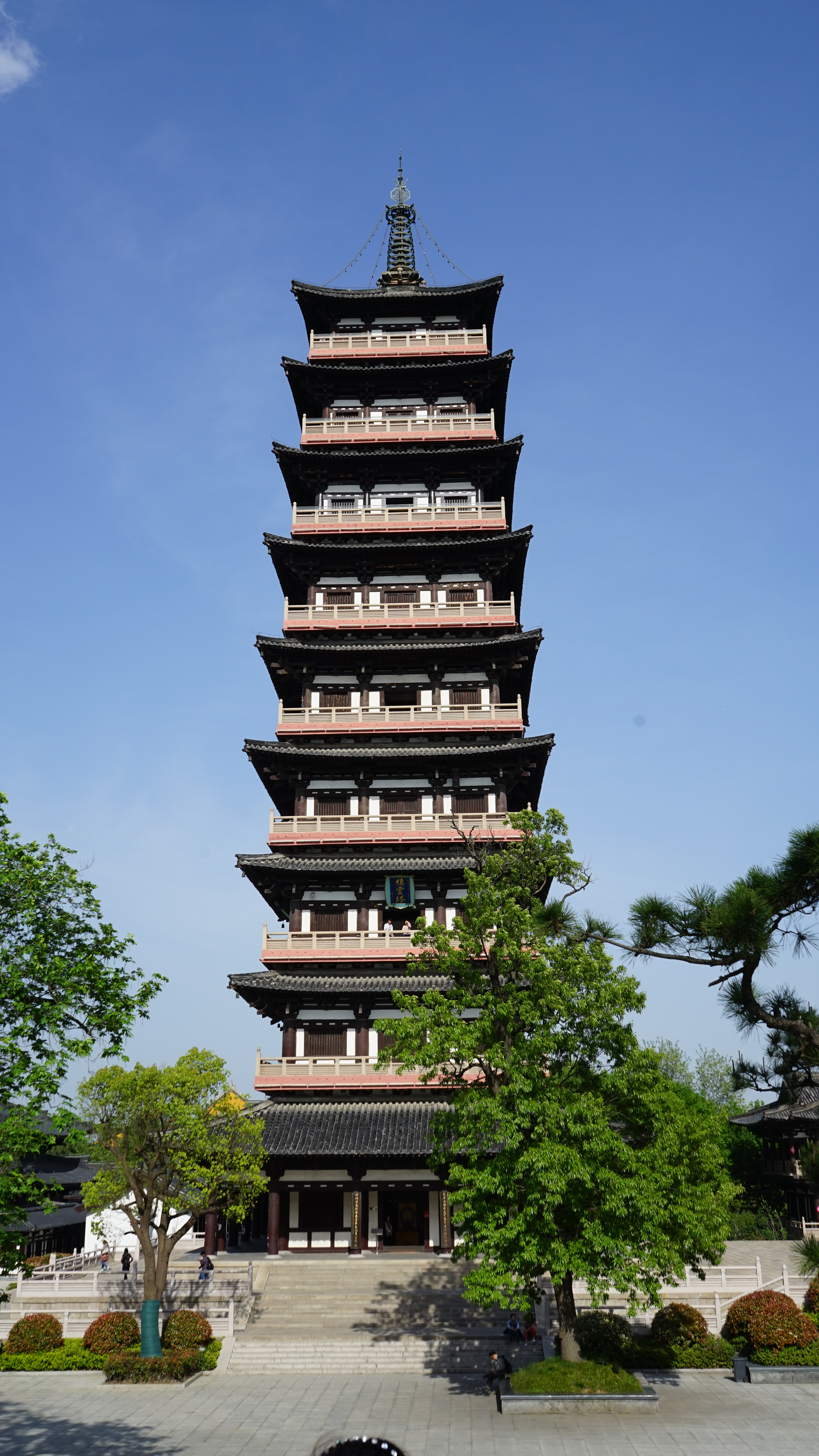
Qiling Temple

The temple was constructed around the hill, which consisted of three parts. The central part consistes of the Hall of the "Four Heavenly Kings" ("Fēng Tiáo Diàn") and the Great Hall. The eastern part consisted of Pingyuan Hall and the "Jianzhen Memorial Hall". The western part consisted of Pingshan Hall, Si Garden and other features. The palaces and pavilions are well integrated with each other and well-arranged in structure.

=== Memorial Hall ===
The Memorial Hall modeled the style of the Main Hall in the Tōshōdai-ji which was organized and built by Jianzhen in Japan. A wood carving sitting statue of Jianzhen which was dry-lacquered and wrapped with linen layer by layer is enshrined in the hall.

=== Pingshan Hall ===
The Pingshan Hall (平山堂) was built by Song dynasty scholar official Ouyang Xiu in 1048 during the Qingli period when he was prefecture chief of Yangzhou. When people overlook the distant scenes, the mountains are at the same level with sight line, hence the name "Pingshan Hall" (平山堂; Ping means the same level and shan means mountains).

=== Qiling Pagoda ===
Some time during the Renshou reign of the Sui dynasty – between 601 and 604 AD, the nine-story "Qiling Pagoda" (栖灵塔) was completed.

== See also ==
- Report on Water for Brewing Tea
