= Zhu Quan =

Chinese prince (1378–1448)

Zhu Quan 朱權

Prince of Ning
- Reign: 1391–1448
- Successor: Zhu Dianpei, Prince Jing
- Born: 1378
- Died: 1448 (aged 69–70)
- Burial: Tomb of Zhu Quan (in present-day Xinjian District, Nanchang, Jiangxi)
- Issue: Zhu Panshi, Hereditary Prince Zhuanghui; Second son; Zhu Panye, Prince Kangxi of Linchuan; Zhu Panyao, Prince Anjian of Yichun; Zhu Panzhu, Prince Anxi of Xinchang; Zhu Panmuo, Prince Daohui of Xinfeng; Princess Yongxin; Princess Yushan; Princess Qingjiang; Princess Fengxin; Princess Jinxi; Princess Taihe; Princess Pengze; Princess Luling; Princess Xinyu; Princess Xincheng; Princess Fuliang; Twelfth daughter; Princess Nanfeng; Princess Yongfeng
Names
- Zhu Quan (朱權)
Posthumous name
- Prince Xian of Ning (寧獻王)
- Father: Hongwu Emperor
- Mother: Imperial Concubine Yang
- Occupation: Historian, military commander, musician, playwright

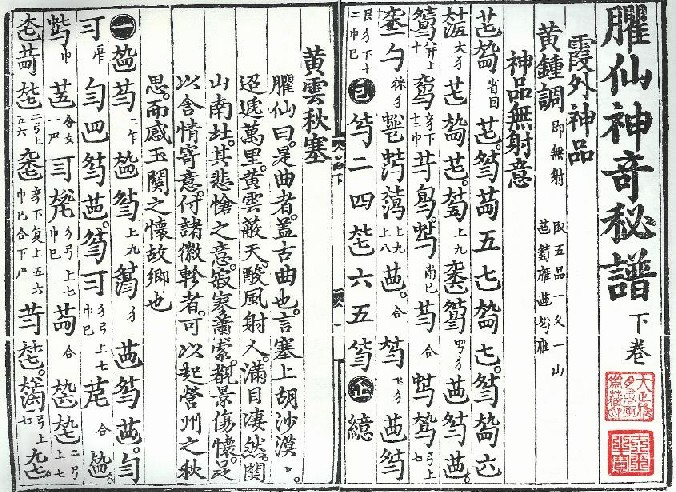
First page / leaf of volume 3 of Zhu Quan's Shenqi Mipu. From right to left: Full title of tablature collection 臞仙神奇秘譜 with volume number 下卷 (lower or third) plus seals of the owner of this copy (if any), title of the volume 霞外神品, the tuning and method of tuning 黃鐘調, name of the 'modal preface' 調意, the tablature (shorthand) of the modal preface, [next page] title of the piece, description of the piece's origins, and the tablature of said piece.

Zhu Quan (simplified Chinese: 朱权; traditional Chinese: 朱權; pinyin: Zhū Quán; 1378–1448), the Prince of Ning (simplified Chinese: 宁王; traditional Chinese: 寧王; pinyin: Nìngwáng), was a Chinese historian, military commander, musician, and playwright. He was the 17th son of the Hongwu Emperor of the Ming dynasty. During his life, he served as a military commander, feudal lord, historian, and playwright. He is also remembered as a great tea connoisseur, a zither player, and composer.

== Other names ==
In addition to Prince of Ning, Zhu Quan was also known as the Strange Scholar of the Great Ming (大明奇士, Da Ming Qi Shi). As part of his Taoist attempts to avoid death, he adopted the aliases the Emaciated Immortal (臞仙, Qúxiān), the "Master who Encompasses Emptiness" (涵虚子, Hánxūzi), "Taoist of the Mysterious Continent" or "Taoist of the Mysterious Island" (玄洲道人, Xuánzhōu Dàoren), and "Perfected Gentleman of the Marvelous Way of the Unfathomable Emptiness of the Southern Pole" (南极沖虚妙道真君, Nánjí Chōngxū Miàodào Zhēnjūn).

== Biography ==
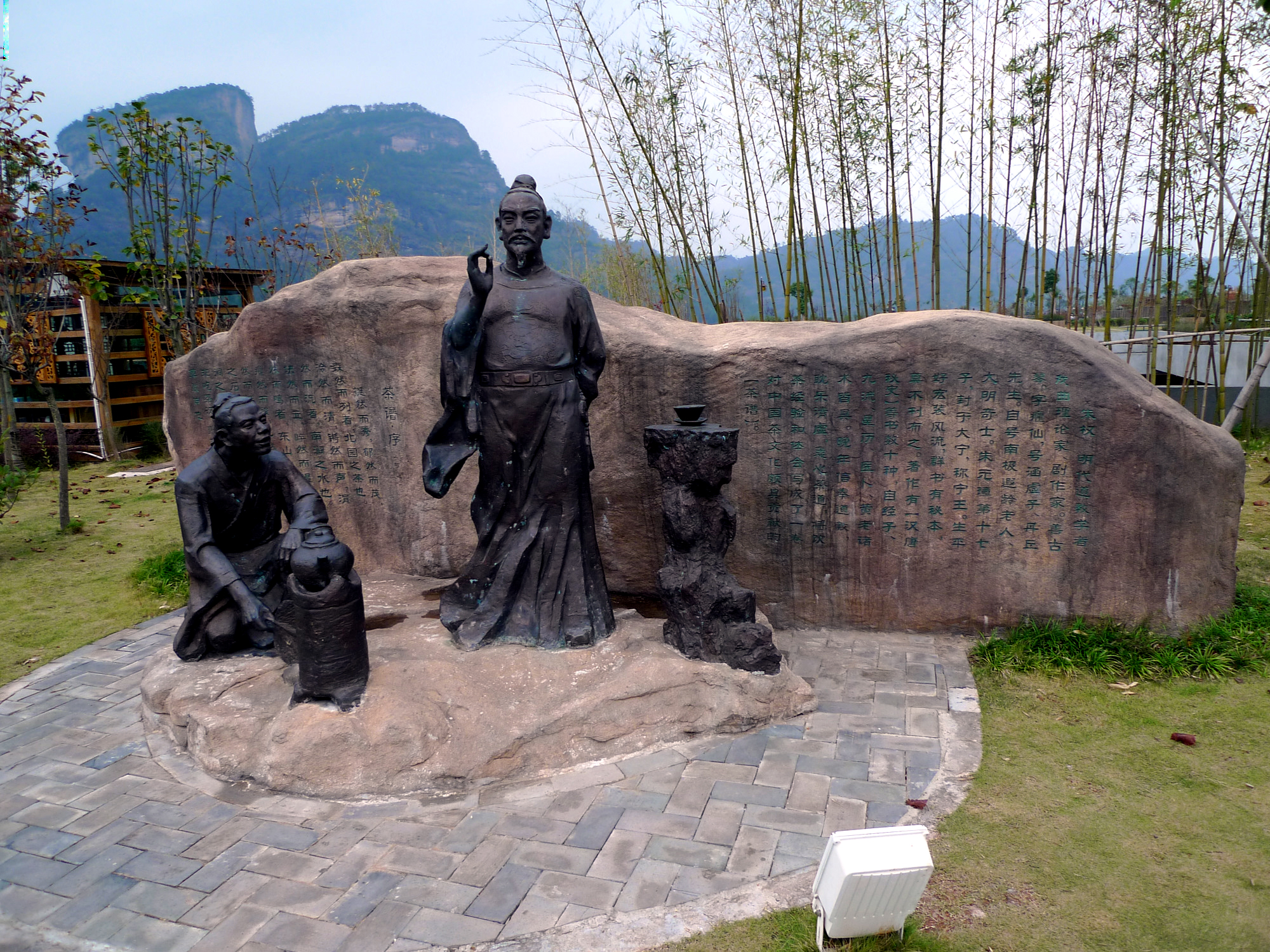
Statue of Zhu Quan in Wuyi Mountain Tea Theme Park

Zhu Quan was initially a military commander in service to his father, the Hongwu Emperor who founded the Ming dynasty. He was granted the frontier fief of Ning with his capital at Daning in present-day Chifeng, Inner Mongolia in 1391. He was famous for his mastery of art and war and played an important role during the unrest surrounding the ascension of his teenage nephew, Jianwen Emperor, in 1399.

Under the advice of his Confucian advisors, the Jianwen Emperor summoned his uncle to an audience in the imperial capital Nanjing. Wary of the emperor's intentions, as other uncles were demoted or executed the same year, Zhu Quan refused and lost three of his divisions for insubordination.

Zhu Di, the Prince of Yan, was preparing for his own uprising against the emperor and considered it a major point to neutralize Zhu Quan, a talented leader of well-trained troops located behind his lines. Taking advantage of Wu Gao's attack on Yongping near modern Shanhaiguan, the Prince of Yan – after crushing Wu Gao's force – rode hastily to Daning and feigned defeat and distress. After several days, his forces were in position and successfully captured Zhu Quan as he was seeing his brother off. The official history of the Ming records Daning's evacuation, with Zhu Quan's harem and courtiers removed to Songtingguan and the prince himself kept in the Yan capital at Beiping, but passes over Zhu Di's setting of the entire city to the torch and the destruction of Zhu Quan's extensive library.

From that point, Zhu Quan assisted his brother in his uprising, with the History of Ming recording that the Prince of Yan offered to split the entire empire between them. After his elevation as the Yongle Emperor in 1402, however, he swiftly reneged and refused to appoint his brother to lordship over Suzhou or Qiantang, instead giving him a choice only of backwater appointments. He settled upon Nanchang, the capital of Jiangxi. After a scare where he was accused of practicing wugu sorcery, (Note: A kind of Chinese black magic where poisonous insects were kept together in a small container until only the deadliest was left. The last surviving insect was then burned and used in the preparation of a potion.) Zhu Quan essentially retired from any interference with the realm, devoting his time instead to cultural pursuits.

Meeting daily with local or visiting scholars and Taoists, he pursued immortality. He treasured and revised his Secret Book of Origins (原始秘书, Yuánshǐ Mìshū), a text which survived the fire of Daning and sharply attacked Buddhism as a foreign "mourning cult" at odds with Chinese culture and proper governance. His encyclopedia of Taoism, the Most Pure and Precious Books on the Way of August Heaven (天皇至道太清玉册, Tiānhuáng Zhìdào Tàiqīngyù Cè), was so esteemed it joined the Taoist canon. His brother ordered him to complete the Comprehensive Mirror of Extensive Essays (Tongjian Bolun) and was also credited with writing Family Advice (Jia Xun), Ceremonial Customs of the Country of Ning (Ningguo Yifan), The Secret History of the Han and Tang (汉唐秘史, Hàn-Táng Mìshǐ), History Breaks Off (Shi Duan), a Book of Essays (文谱, Wén Pǔ), a Book of Poetry (诗谱, Shī Pǔ), and several other annotated anthologies. His most successful was his Tea Manual (茶谱, Chá Pǔ). In addition, he personally funded the publication of many rare books and composed several operas.

Zhu Quan is an important figure in the history of the Chinese zither, or guqin, for his compilation of the important Manual of the Mysterious and Marvellous (神奇秘谱, Shénqí Mì Pǔ) in 1425. This is the earliest known large scale collection of qin scores to have survived to the present day.

== Family ==
Consort:

- Lady Zhang (張氏), Commander of the Wardens Zhang Tai's (兵馬指揮 張泰) daughter, died before his own death.

Sons:

- Zhu Panshi (朱盤烒; 16 October 1395 – 23 February 1437), Hereditary Prince of Ning (寧世子), first son (Note: He was made Hereditary Prince of Ning in May 1404 and initially posthumously honored as Hereditary Prince Zhuanghui (莊惠世子) in 1437, later being honored as Prince Hui of Ning (寧惠王) in 1449.)
  - Married Commander of the East City Wardens Yu Sheng's (東城兵馬指揮 俞盛) daughter as Hereditary Princess of Ning (寧世子妃) in March 1417
- Second son, died young
- Zhu Panye (朱盤燁), third son (Note: He was originally made Prince Kangxi of Linchuan (臨川康僖王), but was later demoted to commoner rank in 1461.)
  - Married Deputy Commander of the North City Wardens Huang Fu's (北城兵馬副指揮 黃福) daughter (d. January 1440) in August 1426, later married Company Commander Wang Xing's (百戶 王興) daughter in May 1455.
- Zhu Panyao (朱盤烑; October 1414 – July 1492), Prince Anjian of Yichun (宜春安簡王), fourth son (Note: He was made Prince Anjian of Yichun in August 1428. His mother was Lady Wang (王氏).)
  - Married Jinwu Rear Guard Commander Liu Xun's (金吾後衛指揮 劉勛) daughter in October 1430
- Zhu Panzhu (朱盤炷; October 1419 – 1459), Prince Anxi of Xinchang (新昌安僖王), fifth son (Note: He was made Prince Anxi of Xinchang in October 1430, but his title was later abolished due to his not having a son. However, he had a daughter, Princess Nankang (南康縣主).)
  - Married Xiaoling Guard Commander Ge Tan's (孝陵衛指揮使 葛覃) daughter in March 1437
- Zhu Panmou (朱盤㷬; 1420 – January 1439), Prince Daohui of Xinfeng (信豐悼惠王), sixth son (Note: He was made Prince Daohui of Xinfeng in October 1432, but his title was later abolished due to his not having a son. His mother was Lady You (尤氏).)

Daughters:

- Princess Yongxin (永新郡主), first daughter (Note: She was made Princess Yongxin in July 1427.)
  - Married Jinxiang Guard Drafter Gao Heling (金鄉衛舍人 高鶴齡)
- Princess Yushan (玉山郡主), second daughter (Note: She was made Princess Yushan in July 1427.)
  - Married Chief Commissioner Drafter Fang Jingxiang (都督舍人 方景祥)
- Princess Qingjiang (清江郡主), third daughter (Note: She was made Princess Qingjiang in February 1427.)
  - Married Xi'ning Guard Commander Chen Tong's (西寧衛指揮 陳通) younger brother Chen Yi (陳逸)
- Princess Fengxin (奉新郡主), fourth daughter (Note: She was made Princess Fengxin on 2 March 1427.)
  - Married Wang Shuang (王爽)
- Princess Jinxi (金溪郡主; d. August 1449), fifth daughter (Note: She was made Princess Jinxi in February 1427.)
  - Married the Right Army Commissioner Han Guan's (右軍都督 韓觀) younger brother Han Fu (韓輔)
- Princess Taihe (泰和郡主), sixth daughter (Note: She was made Princess Taihe in February 1427.)
  - Married Wang Yencheng of Poyang County's (鄱陽縣 汪彥誠) son Wang Zhanran (汪湛然)
- Princess Pengze (彭澤郡主), seventh daughter (Note: She was made Princess Pengze in February 1427.)
  - Married Longxiang Guard Commander Wang Gang's (龍驤衛指揮 王剛) nephew Wang Zhi (王質)
- Princess Luling (廬陵郡主), eighth daughter (Note: She was made Princess Luling in February 1427.)
  - Married Qizhou Guard Commander Tian Sheng's (蘄州衛指揮 田晟) younger brother Tian Yu (田昱)
- Princess Xinyu (新喻郡主), ninth daughter (Note: She was made Princess Xinyu in February 1427.)
  - Married Ganzhou Prefecture Record Keeper Hu Yu's (贛州府照磨 胡羽) son Hu Guangji (胡光霽)
- Princess Xincheng (新城郡主), tenth daughter (Note: She was made Princess Xincheng in February 1427.)
  - Married Regent (Liushou) Central Guard Commander Li Jun's (留守中衛指揮 李俊) son Li Huan (李瓛)
- Princess Fuliang (浮梁郡主), 11th daughter (Note: She was made Princess Fuliang in July 1427.)
- Twelfth daughter, died young, no title
- Princess Nanfeng (南豐郡主), 13th daughter (Note: She was made Princess Nanfeng in February 1427.)
  - Married Jiangxi Military Commissioner Zhang Xiang's (江西都指揮 張祥) son Zhang Wen (張雯)
- Princess Yongfeng (永豊郡主), 14th daughter (Note: She was made Princess Yongfeng in June 1438.)

== Descendants ==
Zhu Quan's descendant, Zhu Chenhao, the Prince of Ning, rebelled against the Zhengde Emperor in what is known as the Chenhao rebellion. It was only forty-three days before it was put down by Wang Yangming, the Governor of Nan'gan, resulting in the abolition of the Prince of Ning's fiefdom. The famous painter Bada Shanren was his seventh-generation grandson, and Lin Shiyi (林時益), one of Yitang Jiuzi (易堂九子), was his eighth-generation grandson.

== See also ==
- Tea Classics
- Guqin
