= Report on Water for Brewing Tea =

9th-century monograph written by Zhang Youxin (张又新)

- Author: Zhang Youxin
- Language: Mandarin
- Subject: Quality of water for brewing tea
- Published: 814
- Media type: Monograph

Chinese name
- Traditional Chinese: 《煎茶水記》
- Simplified Chinese: 《煎茶水记》
Transcriptions
Standard Mandarin
- Hanyu Pinyin: Jiāncháshuǐ jì
- Wade–Giles: Chien-ch'a-shui Chi

Report on Water for Brewing Tea (simplified Chinese: 煎茶水记; traditional Chinese: 煎茶水記; pinyin: Jiāncháshuǐ jì) is a monograph written by the late Tang dynasty-era author Zhang Youxin (simplified Chinese: 张又新; traditional Chinese: 張又新) in AD 814. This book is the earliest monograph wholly devoted to the quality of water for brewing tea. It was compiled alongside several other texts on tea from the same period into the 13th-century Baichuan Xuehai (百川學海).

== Content ==
The primary content of the work was a pair of lists of water sources and the quality of these sources. Parts included:

- A short list of water sources from seven locations, ranked from best to worst:
1. Nanling on the lower Yangtze River
2. Huishan Spring near Wuxi in Jiangsu
3. Spring at Tiger Hill Temple near Suzhou in Jiangsu
4. Spring at Guanyin Temple in Danyang in Jiangsu
5. Pingshan Spring at Daming Temple in Yangzhou in Jiangsu
6. Wusong River, now Suzhou Creek in Jiangsu and Shanghai
7. Huai River
- An anecdote about Lu Yu's marvellous ability as water connoisseur.
- A longer list of water quality ranking from twenty locations, with water from melting snow placed last.
