= Record of Xuan He Era Tribute Tea in Bei Yuan District =

Chinese ancient treatise on tea

- Author: Xiong Fan (熊蕃)
- Original title: 宣和北苑貢茶錄; Xūan hé běi yuàn gòng chā lù
- Language: Mandarin Chinese

Record of Xuan He Era Tribute Tea in Bei Yuan District (simplified Chinese: 宣和北苑贡茶录; traditional Chinese: 宣和北苑貢茶錄; pinyin: Xūan hé běi yuàn gòng chā lù) is a book written by Xiong Fan during the Song dynasty.

The book contains detailed descriptions of the names of various tribute tea cakes and their packaging, some even with dimensions. Two examples of such descriptions are "Longevity Dragon cake, silver mold, bamboo frame, one inch diameter" and "Eternal Spring Jade Leaf, bamboo frame, diameter 3½ inch.".

The book is one of the Chinese tea classics, ancient treatises on tea.

== See also ==
- Chinese tea
