= Book of Vermilion Fish =

Book of Vermilion Fish 硃砂魚譜
- Author: Zhang Qiande 張謙德
- Translator: A. C. Moule
- Language: Chinese
- Genre: Monograph
- Publication date: 1596
- Publication place: China
- English publication date: 1950

Book of Vermilion Fish (simplified Chinese: 朱砂鱼谱; traditional Chinese: 硃砂魚譜; pinyin: Zhūshāyú pǔ; Wade–Giles: Chu-sha-yü-p'u) is the first monograph on goldfish in the world, written by Chinese writer Zhang Qiande (simplified Chinese: 张谦德; traditional Chinese: 張謙德; pinyin: Zhāng Qiāndé; Wade–Giles: Chang Ch'ien-te) (1577－1643) in 1596 during the Ming dynasty.

== See also ==
- Fishkeeping
