= Pictorial of Tea Ware =

1269 picture book on teaware by Shenan

Tea Ware Pictorial (simplified Chinese: 茶具图赞; traditional Chinese: 茶具圖贊; pinyin: chájùtúzàn) is a book by "Old Man Shenan" (审安老人; 審安老人; shěnān lǎorén) compiled in 1269 and is the earliest picture book on tea ware used in preparation of Song dynasty tea cakes for drinking.

Tea during the Song dynasty was prepared by using the whisking tea method. The green tea was ground into a fine powder and hot water was added then whisked in a bowl with a brush to make tea and foam, this Chinese method of preparing tea spread to Japan and became the way matcha tea is made in Japan today. While in China this method gave way to the brewing tea method, which is the infusion of loose tea.

== Old Man Shenan’s 12 Tea Ware ==
This book described 12 tea wares (審安老人的12茶具):

Some of the tea terms of Shenan and Lu Yu, author of The Classic of Tea, have the same names and use because some of the tea wares from the Tang dynasty were also used in the Song dynasty. Shenan does give them special names noted in parentheses.

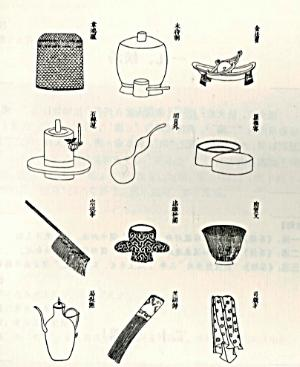
Song dynasty tea ware

- Brazier 風爐 (韋鴻臚; hong lu)
- Crushing Block 砧椎 (木待制; mu dai zhi)
- Crushing Roller 碾 (金法曹; jin fa cao)
- Stone Mill 石磨 (石轉運; shi zhuan yun)
- Gourd Scooper 瓢 (胡員外; hu yuan wai)
- Sieve Box 羅合 (羅樞密; luo shu mi)
- Brush 札 (宗從事; zong cong shi)
- Bowl Basket 畚 (漆雕秘閣; qi diao mi ge)
- Bowl 碗 (陶寶文; tao bao wen)
- Water Vessel 水方 (湯提點; tang ti dian)
- Tea Whisk 茶筅 (竺副師; zhu fu shi)
- Tea Cloth 巾 (司職方; si zhi fang)

The above tea wares, except for stone mill (石磨) and tea whisk (茶筅), were also mentioned by Lu Yu in The Classic of Tea.

== See also ==
- The Classic of Tea (Tang dynasty)
