= Lu Yu =

Chinese writer who influenced tea drinking

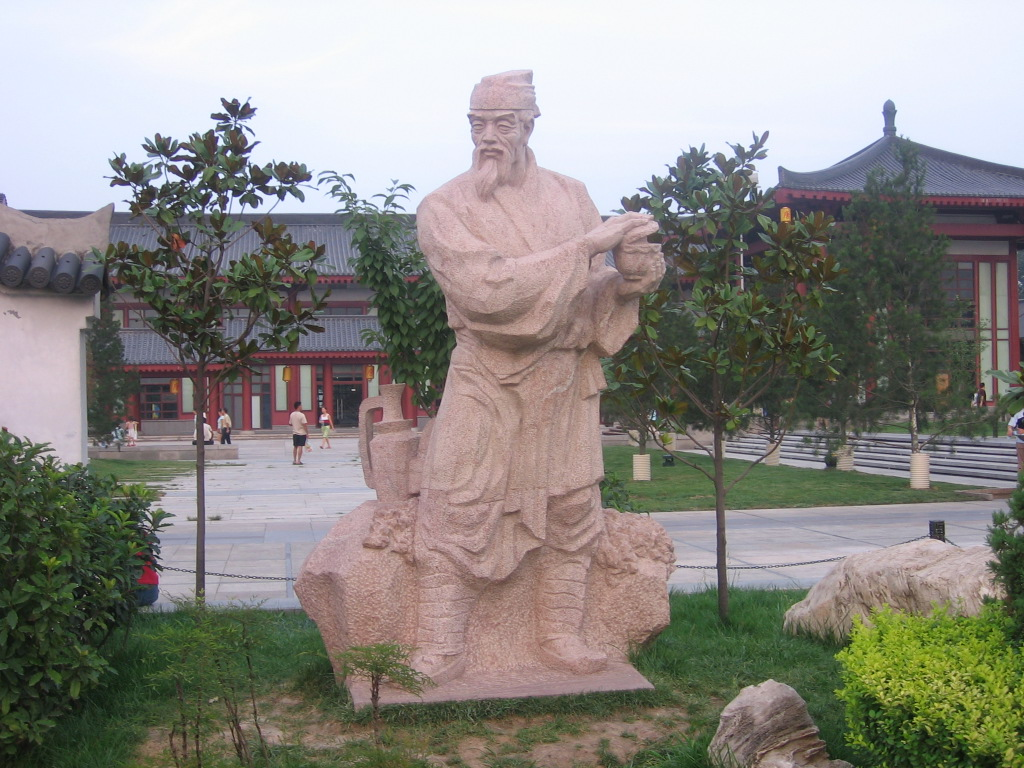
A statue of Lu Yu in Xi'an

Lu Yu (traditional Chinese: 陸羽; simplified Chinese: 陆羽; pinyin: Lù Yǔ; 733–804) or Lu Ji (陆疾), courtesy name Jici (季疵) was a Chinese tea master and writer. He is respected as the Sage of Tea for his contribution to Chinese tea culture. He is best known for his monumental book The Classic of Tea, also known as Cha Ching/Cha Jing (simplified Chinese: 茶经), the first definitive work on cultivating, making and drinking tea.

== Biography ==
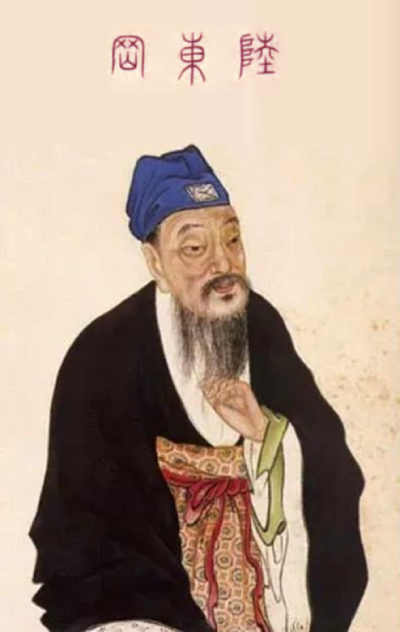
Qing dynasty illustration featuring Lu Yü's name in small seal script (Qianlong Emperor era).

Lu Yu was born in 733 in Tianmen, Hubei. For six years, Lu Yu stayed in Huomen mountain studying under the guidance of master Zou Fuzi. During this period, Lu Yu often brewed tea for his teacher. He also took care of fellow students' health using his remarkable knowledge in tea and herbs that he learned while at the Longgai Monastery.

Whenever time permitted between his studies Lu Yu often went to the countryside to gather tea leaves and herbs. In one of those trips Lu Yu stumbled upon a spring underneath a 6-foot round rock and the water from the spring was extremely clear and clean. When Lu Yu brewed tea with this spring water, he found the tea tasted unexpectedly better than usual. From then on, Lu Yu realised the importance of quality water in brewing tea.

Zou Fuzi was moved by Lu Yu's obsession with tea and his skill in brewing good tea. He cleared the rock together with some of his students and dug a well around the fountainhead of that spring.

In 1768, just over a thousand years later during the Qing dynasty (1616–1911), Jingling was hit by drought and the whole city was badly in need of water. City folks found water still flowing from this well uncovered by Lu Yu and dug by Zou Fuzi. A Qing official ordered three wells to be dug around the spring and a structure constructed near the wells named "Lu Yu Hut" and the "Literary Spring".

In 752 Lu Yu concluded his studies, bade farewell to his Shifu (teacher) Zou Fuzi (邹夫子) and returned to Jingling to meet his benefactor Li Qiwu (李齐物). However, a year earlier Li Qiwu was reinstated and returned to the Tang capital Chang'an. The new Chief Official of Jingling now was Cui Guofu (崔国辅). Cui, a senior official who held a position similar to an Education Minister of today, was demoted to Jingling as a Chief Official for offending a member of the royalty.

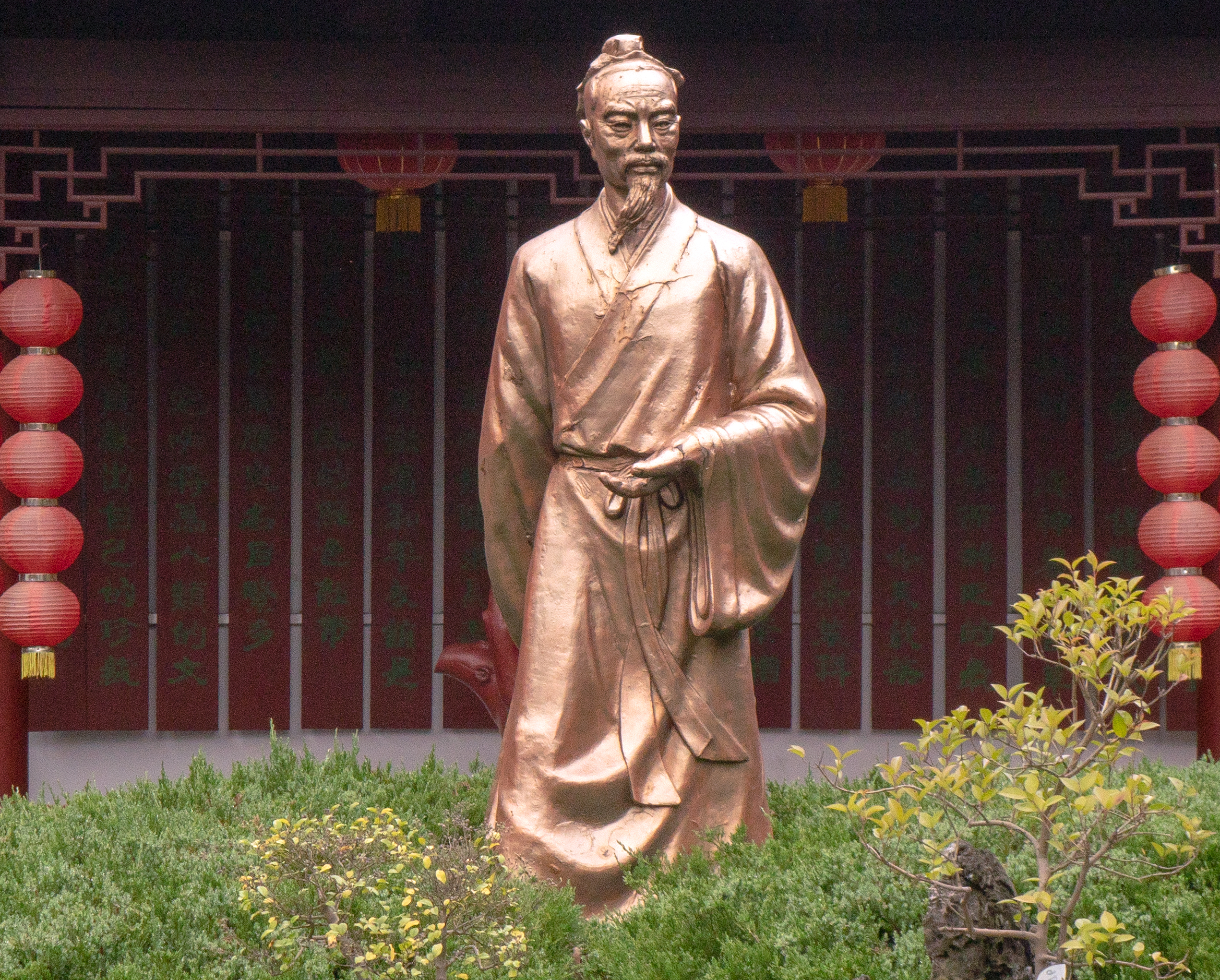
Statue of Lu Yu, at the Dragon Well Tea Plantation, Meijiawu, Hangzhou

Cui Guofu was a scholar and poet well known for his magnificent 5 characters per verse short poem. After his demotion to Jingling, Cui Guofu took life fairly easy. Even though Cui was many years older than Lu Yu, both men shared the same interest in tea, literature, and poetry. As such they became good friends soon after they met. During this period, Lu Yu stayed with Cui Guofu and assisted him in his administrative tasks. The two spent much time traveling, drinking tea, and writing poems, and they co-authored several books on poems.

This period with Cui Guofu was the growing phase for Lu Yu as a man of letters; an incubation period for Lu Yu to practise and sharpen what he learned from Zou Fuzi. Cui Guofu, with his vast experience and skill in literary work, became a coach that provided the necessary guidance to enhance and mature Lu Yu's writing and literary skills. During this time he wrote The Classic of Tea.

The original version of The Classic of Tea consisted of 3 books totaling 10 chapters: book 1 consisted of the first 3 chapters; book 2 consisted of chapter 4 only; book 3 consisted of chapters 5 to 10. After the Tang dynasty all three books were bound into a single volume, and the three-volume version was no longer available.

== Lu Yu in New Book of Tang ==
The New Book of Tang is the historical record of the Tang dynasty (618–907) by scholars in the Song dynasty (960–1279). A chapter in the New Book of Tang is Lu Yu's biography. The book recorded Lu Yu's obsession with tea, and he wrote a three-volume book Ch'a Ching about details of tea's origin, the method of cultivating and drinking tea, and the tools of tea drinking. The tea sellers of that time would make pottery statues of Lu Yu and worship him as the "tea god."

The new imperial supervisor Li Jiqing (李季卿) supervised the southeastern region of the Tang dynasty. Li Jiqing knew there were two masters of brewing tea, Chang Boxiong (常伯熊) and Lu Yu. When Li Jiqing visited Chang Boxiong, Li respected Chang by raising the teacup several times. When Li Jiqing visited Lu Yu, Lu was in a costume of villagers, so Li did not salute Lu. Lu Yu considered that as shame and wrote Hui Chalun (毁茶论), a book about behaviors that could ruin tea culture. After Ch'a Ching and Hui Chalun, drinking tea became popular in the Tang dynasty.

== See also ==
- History of tea in China
- Tea Classics
- Lu-Yu Tea Culture Institute
