= The Classic of Tea =

Monograph on tea written by Lu Yu in the 760s CE

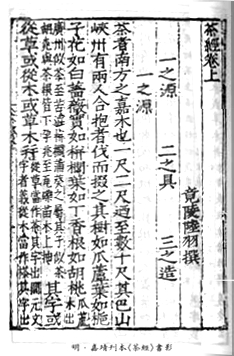
- The Classic of Tea by Lu Yu
- Traditional Chinese: 《茶經》
- Simplified Chinese: 《茶经》
Transcriptions
Standard Mandarin
- Hanyu Pinyin: Chájīng; Chá Jīng
- Wade–Giles: Ch'a-ching; Ch'a Ching

The Classic of Tea, Tea Classic, or Chajing is a Chinese philosophy monograph (zibu) on tea and tea culture written by Tang dynasty writer Lu Yu between 760 and 762 CE, and is the first known tea classics in the world. Lu Yu's original manuscript is lost; the earliest editions currently available was dated to the Ming dynasty.

According to tea lore, Lu Yu was an orphan of Jinling county (now Tianmen City in Hubei Province) who was adopted by a Buddhist monk of the Dragon Cloud Monastery. He refused to take up the monastic robes and was assigned menial jobs by his stepfather. Lu Yu ran away and joined the circus as a clown. At age 14, Lu Yu was discovered by the local governor Li Qiwu, who offered Lu Yu the use of his library and the opportunity to study with a teacher. During the An Lushan rebellion, Lu Yu retired to Shaoqi (now Wuxing county, Zhejiang). Lu Yu made friends with many literati, including the calligrapher Yan Zhenqing and the poet Huangfu Zheng.

For Lu Yu, tea symbolized the harmony and mysterious unity of the universe. "He invested the Ch'a Ching with the concept that dominated the religious thought of his age, whether Buddhist, Taoist, or Confucian: to see in the particular an expression of the universal".

In Lu Yu's hometown, Tianmen, there is an ancient styled tower named according to the classic in honour of the great writer.

== Huangfu Zeng's poem about Lu Yu ==
A thousand mountains will greet my departing friend,
When the spring teas blossom again.
With such breadth and wisdom,
Serenely picking tea—
Through morning mists
Or crimson evening clouds—
His solitary journey is my envy.
We rendezvous at a remote mountain temple,
Where we enjoy tea by a clear pebble fountain.
In that silent night,
Lit only by candlelight,
I struck a marble bell—
Its chime carrying me
A hidden man
Deep into thoughts of ages past.

— "The Day I Saw Lu Yu off to Pick Tea"

== Content ==
Lu Yu's Tea Classic is the earliest known treatise on tea, and perhaps the most famous work on tea. The book is not large, about 7000 Chinese characters in the literary language of the Tang dynasty, a condensed, refined and poetic style of Chinese. It is made of "Three Scrolls Ten Chapters" (三卷十章):

=== One: Origin (一之源) ===
This chapter covers the mythological origins of tea in China. It also contains a horticultural description of the tea plant and its proper planting as well as some etymological speculation, features and characteristics of tea trees. The characteristics of quality tea leaves, and soils and topography compared to tea quality. Benefits of good teas and bad teas. The geographical region, harvest seasons and growing methods in relation to tea quality.

=== Two: Tools (二之具) ===
This chapter describes fifteen tools for picking, steaming, pressing, drying and storing tea leaves and cakes.

=== Three: Making (三之造) ===
This chapter recommends methods for the production of tea cake.

=== Four: Utensils (四之器) ===
This chapter describes twenty eight items used in the brewing and drinking of tea.

Brazier

- crushing block (砧椎)
- brazier (風爐)
- charcoal basket (炭筥)
- charcoal mallet (炭檛)
- fire chopsticks (火筴)
- cauldron (鍑)
- cauldron stand (交床)
- tea tongs (夾)
- paper wallet (紙囊)
- crushing roller (碾)
- sieve box (羅合)
- tea holder (則)
- water vessel (水方)
- water filter bag (漉水囊)
- gourd scooper (瓢)
- bamboo tongs (竹夾)
- salt container (鹺簋)
- boiled water vessel (熟盂)
- bowl (碗)
- bowl basket (畚)
- brush (劄)
- water basin (滌方)
- spent tea basin (滓方)
- tea cloth (巾)
- utensil table (具列)
- utensil basket (都籃)

=== Five: Boiling (五之煮) ===
This chapter covers:

- Guidelines for the proper preparation of tea.

=== Six: Drinking (六之飲) ===
This chapter discusses the actual consumption of tea, some of its properties, the history of tea drinking, and the various types of tea known in 8th century China.

=== Seven: History (七之事) ===
This chapter gives various anecdotes about the history of tea in Chinese records, from Shennong through the Tang dynasty. It begins with an index list of influential individuals related to tea before the Tang dynasty. Further topics include a collection of literature and historical records on tea legends and famous people, folklore and customs, tea poems and tea stories, health benefits of tea in recorded medical books, tea as medical herb and tea cure formula, tea usage in cooking and tea recipes.

=== Eight: Growing Regions (八之出) ===
This chapter compares and ranks eight tea producing regions in China at its time.

=== Nine: Simplify (九之略) ===
This chapter lists procedures that may be omitted and under what circumstances, tools and methods that can be excluded in cultivation and processing under abnormal conditions, and tea utensils and brewing methods that can be simplified or improvised under various outdoor and unusual habitat environments.

=== Ten: Pictorialize (十之圖) ===
This chapter consists of how to transfer the contents onto placards or large scrolls for hanging on the wall for quick references. The silk scrolls that provide an abbreviated version of the previous nine chapters.

== See also ==
- Tea classics
- Chinese tea culture
