= Matcha =

Fine powder green tea

matcha
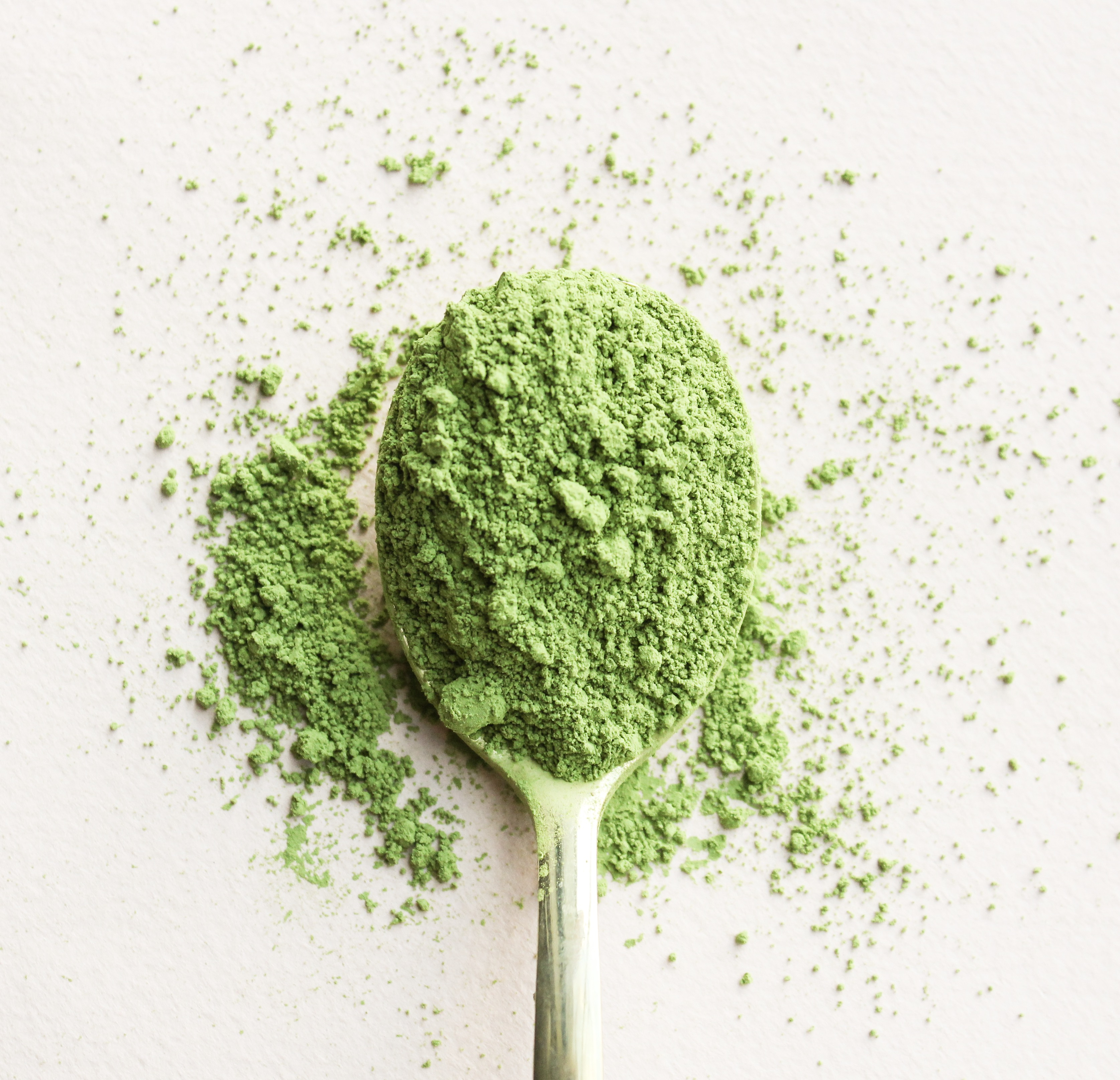
- Type: Green tea
- Other names: 抹茶,"fine powder tea"
- Origin: China (powdered tea); Japan (modern matcha)
- Quick description: Japanese stone-ground powder green tea

Regional names
- "Matcha" in kanji

Chinese name
- Chinese: 末茶 抹茶
Transcriptions
Standard Mandarin
- Hanyu Pinyin: mǒchá
- IPA: [mwǒ.ʈʂʰá]
Yue: Cantonese
- Jyutping: mut3-caa4
- IPA: [mut̚˧.tsʰa˩]

Korean name
- Hangul: 말차
- Hanja: 抹茶
Transcriptions
- Revised Romanization: malcha
- McCune–Reischauer: malch'a

Alternative Korean name
- Hangul: 가루차
Transcriptions
- Revised Romanization: garucha
- McCune–Reischauer: karuch'a

Japanese name
- Kanji: 抹茶
- Kana: まっちゃ
Transcriptions
- Revised Hepburn: matcha

Matcha (Note: "Matcha", also called fine powder tea or powdered tea, is the most common spelling, and accords with Hepburn romanization of the hiragana まっちゃ. In Kunrei-shiki romanization (ISO 3602) it is "mattya". "Maccha" is a nonstandard and uncommon spelling.) (/ˈmætʃə, ˈmɑːtʃə/; Japanese: 抹茶) is a finely ground powder of green tea specially processed from shade-grown tea leaves. Shade growing gives matcha its characteristic bright green color and strong umami flavor. Matcha is typically consumed suspended in hot water.

Matcha originated through cultural exchanges between China and Japan in the premodern period, developing from earlier powdered tea practices in China that were transmitted to Japan by Zen Buddhist monks. During the Song dynasty, tea leaves were ground into a fine powder and whisked with hot water. This method was introduced to Japan by the monk Eisai around 1191, where it continued to develop and ultimately evolved into what the world knows today as matcha even as such practices declined in China.

During the Muromachi period in the sixteenth century, Japanese tea farmers developed shading techniques to produce tencha (碾茶), the tea leaves used for grinding into matcha. This innovation contributed to the development of modern matcha, characterized by its vivid green color and rich umami flavor, the latter derived from theanine, distinguishing it from earlier forms of powdered tea. It also contributed to the development in Japan of new tea styles such as sencha and gyokuro. Traditionally, matcha was produced almost exclusively in Japan, although it is now also produced in other countries such as China and South Korea. In the twenty-first century, to meet the rising global demand for matcha, China invited Japanese specialists for technical guidance, introduced the necessary equipment, and has promoted mass production in Guizhou Province since 2018. While Japan still produces the finest matcha, the quality of Chinese matcha has been improving rapidly enough to be used in the food processing industry at more competitive prices.

The traditional Japanese tea ceremony, typically known as chanoyu (茶の湯) or sadō/chadō (茶道), centers on the preparation, serving and drinking of matcha as hot tea, and embodies a meditative and spiritual practice.

Matcha is also used to flavor and dye foods such as mochi and soba noodles, green tea ice cream, matcha lattes, and a variety of Japanese wagashi confectionery. For this purpose, matcha made green by color additives instead of expensive shade-grown matcha is often used.

== Definition ==
Strict definitions of matcha are given by the International Organization for Standardization, ISO 20715:2023 "Tea — Classification of tea types", and the Japanese food labeling standard defined by Japan Tea Central Public Interest Incorporated Association (日本茶業中央会).

Both definitions require that matcha must be:

- made from Camellia sinensis var. sinensis (Chinese, small-leaf tea)
- grown in the shade
- steamed and dried without being rolled
- ground to a fine powder

The Japanese food labeling standard requires the tea leaves to be shaded for 2–3 weeks before harvesting using covering materials such as yoshizu, (Note: covering material made by reed) komo, (Note: covering material made by manchurian wild rice) or cheesecloth. Tea leaves after processing the first three steps are called tencha (碾茶) in this standard. ISO 20715:2023 allows matcha to be made from tender leaves, buds, or shoots, but Japanese food labeling standard allows it to be made only from leaves.

Inexpensive green tea, hunmatsucha (粉末茶), made by crushing non-shade grown tea leaves, is sometimes sold under the name of "matcha" although it does not satisfy the above definitions. The cheaper alternative is used to flavor and dye foods.

== History ==
=== China ===
==== Powdered and compressed teas ====
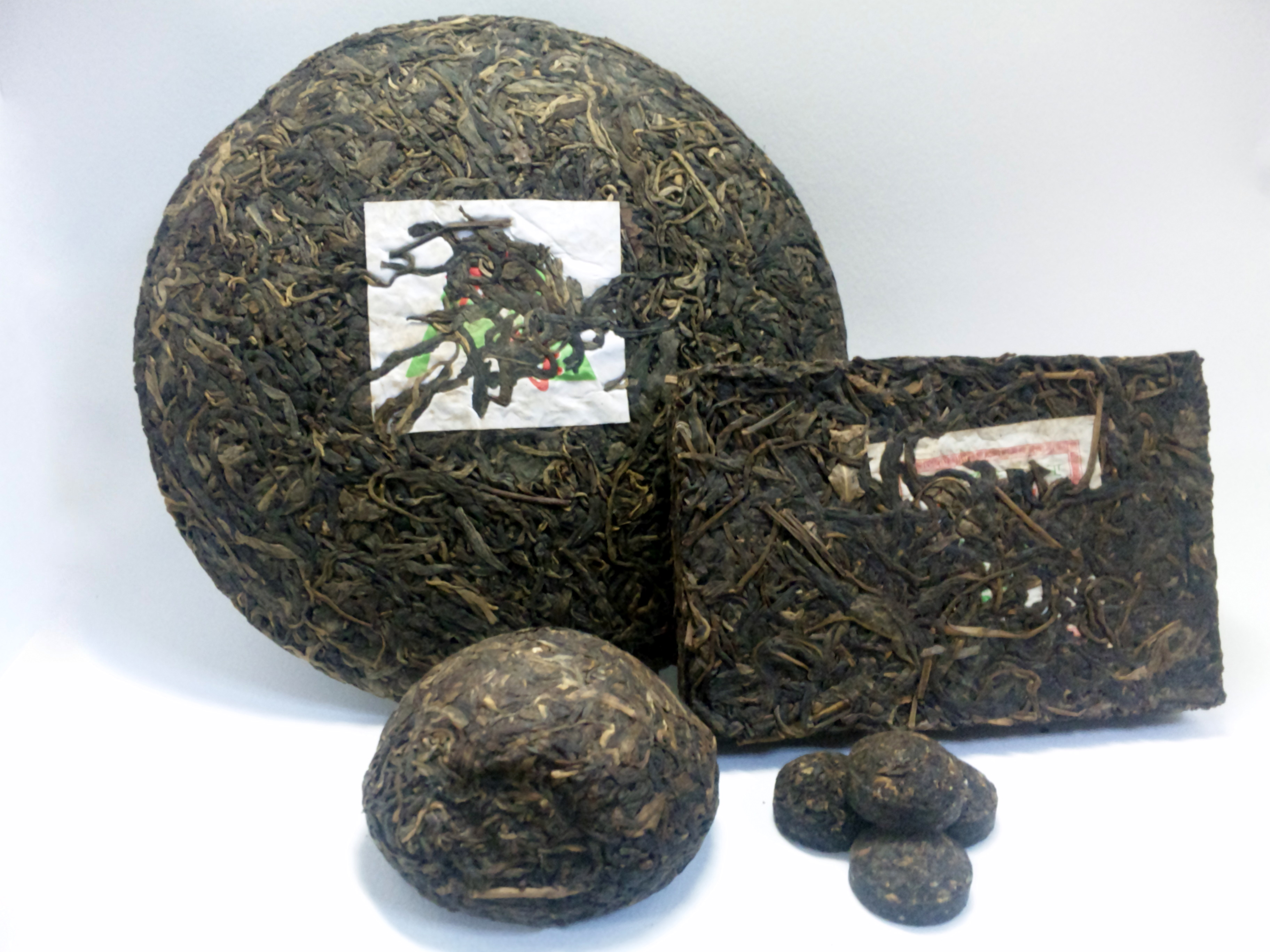
Various types of compressed teas

Powdered tea originated in China during the Tang dynasty (618–907) where tea leaves were pounded and then milled into fine powder before being shaped into "cakes". The Classic of Tea, written by Chinese tea master Lu Yu roughly between 760 to 762 CE, had documented the practise of steeping powdered tea in hot water. This involved first roasting compressed tea over a fire and then grinding it in a wooden grinder called a niǎn (碾, Japanese: yagen), boiling water in a pot, adding salt once it comes to a boil, then adding the tea powder to the boiling water and boiling it until it began to foam. The tea was also sometimes mixed with green onions, ginger, jujubes, mandarin orange peels, Tetradium ruticarpum, and mint.

It wasn't until the Song dynasty (960–1279) when whisks, bowls, and other tools first appeared in China that was used to froth up a drink called "mo cha", which translates to "powdered tea", and was made from steamed and dried tea leaves. According to Katharine P. Burnett, a tea scholar at the University of California, Davis, it was also during this era when Zen Buddhist monks from Japan began to visit China to attain books and sutras from Chinese scholars, and Japanese Buddhist monks will often encounter mo cha and its style of preparation in the Chinese temples. The beverage was prepared by whipping the tea powder with hot water in a bowl. Although the term "matcha" (抹茶) was not yet used, the practice of preparing powdered tea with a tea whisk is believed to have originated in China no later than the 11th century.

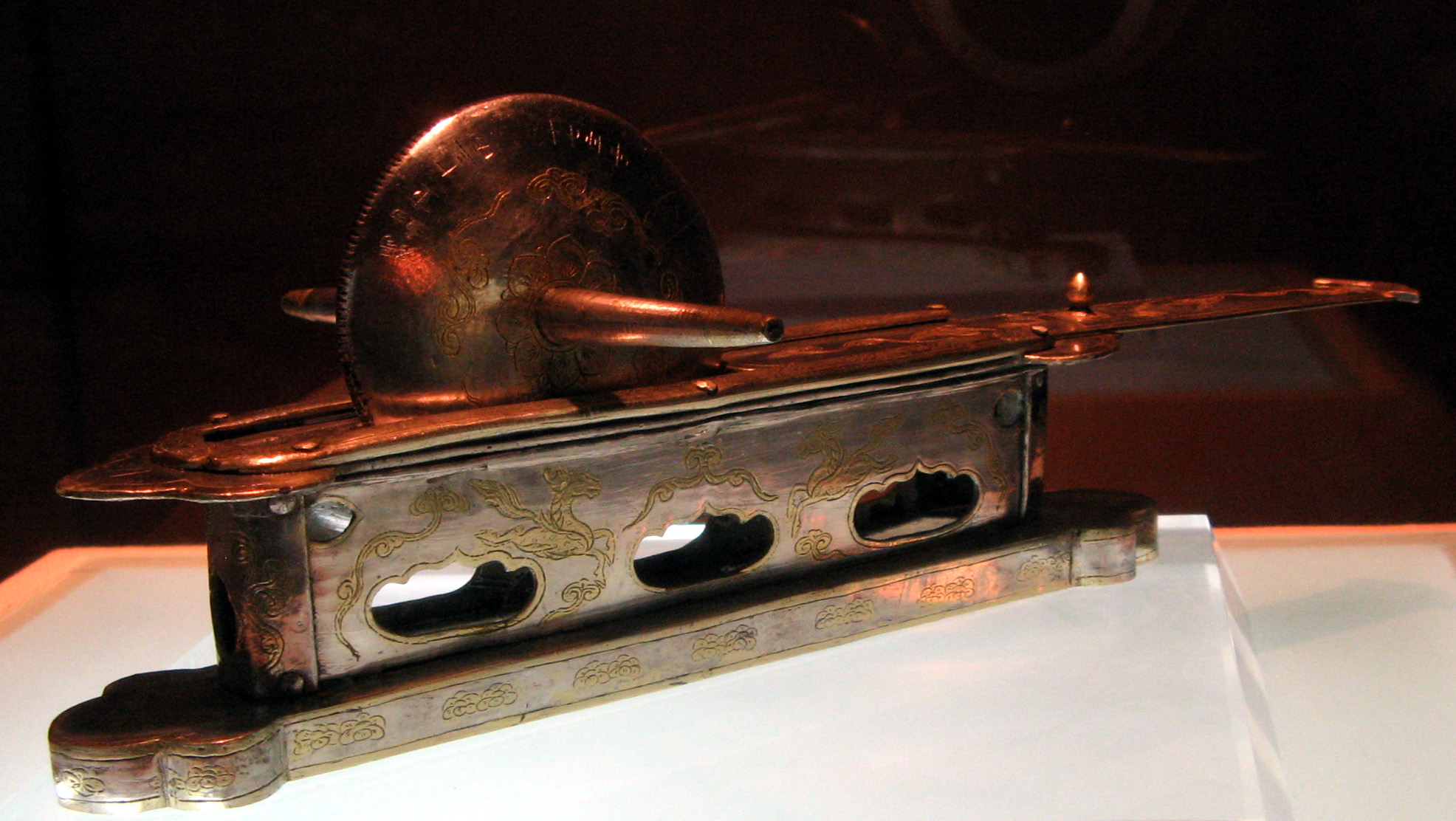
Niǎn(茶碾子), Tea Grind in tea set preserved in Famen Temple Crypt, Xi'an, China. Xizong Era of Tang Dynasty, 9th Century.

The most famous references to powdered tea are Cai Xiang's Record of Tea (1049–1053) and Emperor Huizong's Treatise on Tea (1107), both written during the Song dynasty (960–1279). These documents describe the preparation of high-grade compressed tea, such as Lóngfèng Tuánchá (龍鳳團茶, lit. 'Dragon and Phoenix Lump Tea'). The tea was ground into powder using a metal niǎn, then sifted. The powder was poured into a tea bowl, hot water was added, and the mixture was whisked.

According to the Record of Tea, the finer the sieve, the more the tea would float; the coarser the sieve, the more it would sink. This suggests that the powder particles were larger than those of modern matcha. Tea ceremonies at Kennin-ji in Kyoto and Engaku-ji in Kamakura are thought to preserve traditions from the Song dynasty.

The lump tea presented to the emperor was mixed with borneol, a strongly aromatic substance, and coated with oily flavorings to give it a glossy surface—so much so that the tea's original aroma was lost. Cai Xiang criticized such processing.

In addition, the ideal color of tea was considered to be white, rather than green or brown. However, since tea powder could not usually be made white, various processing methods had to be employed to whiten it. For example, tea buds were plucked just after sprouting, repeatedly squeezed, and water was added repeatedly during grinding. A type of white tea called "water buds" (水芽) was also made, in which the leafy part of the sprout was removed, leaving only the veins as raw material.

==== Declining usage of compressed tea ====
The complex manufacturing process of lump tea during the Song dynasty required significant labor and expense, and even the slightest error could result in failure. As a result, it was costly and inaccessible to the common people. During the Tang dynasty, "bitter when sipped and sweet when swallowed" (The Classic of Tea) was regarded as the ideal taste of tea. However, in the Song dynasty, this ideal was deliberately replaced with four desirable qualities: "aroma, sweetness, richness, and smoothness" (Treatise on Tea). This shift represented an attempt to eliminate the natural bitterness of tea. As a result, lump tea became an expensive and complicated product, and some scholars suggest this contributed to its rapid decline after the Ming dynasty.

In the Ming dynasty, the founding emperor Zhu Yuanzhang issued a ban on the production of compressed tea in 1391. This decree led to the abandonment of compressed tea in China. Instead, a new method—similar to modern tea preparation—in which loose tea is steeped in hot water and extracted, became the mainstream practice.

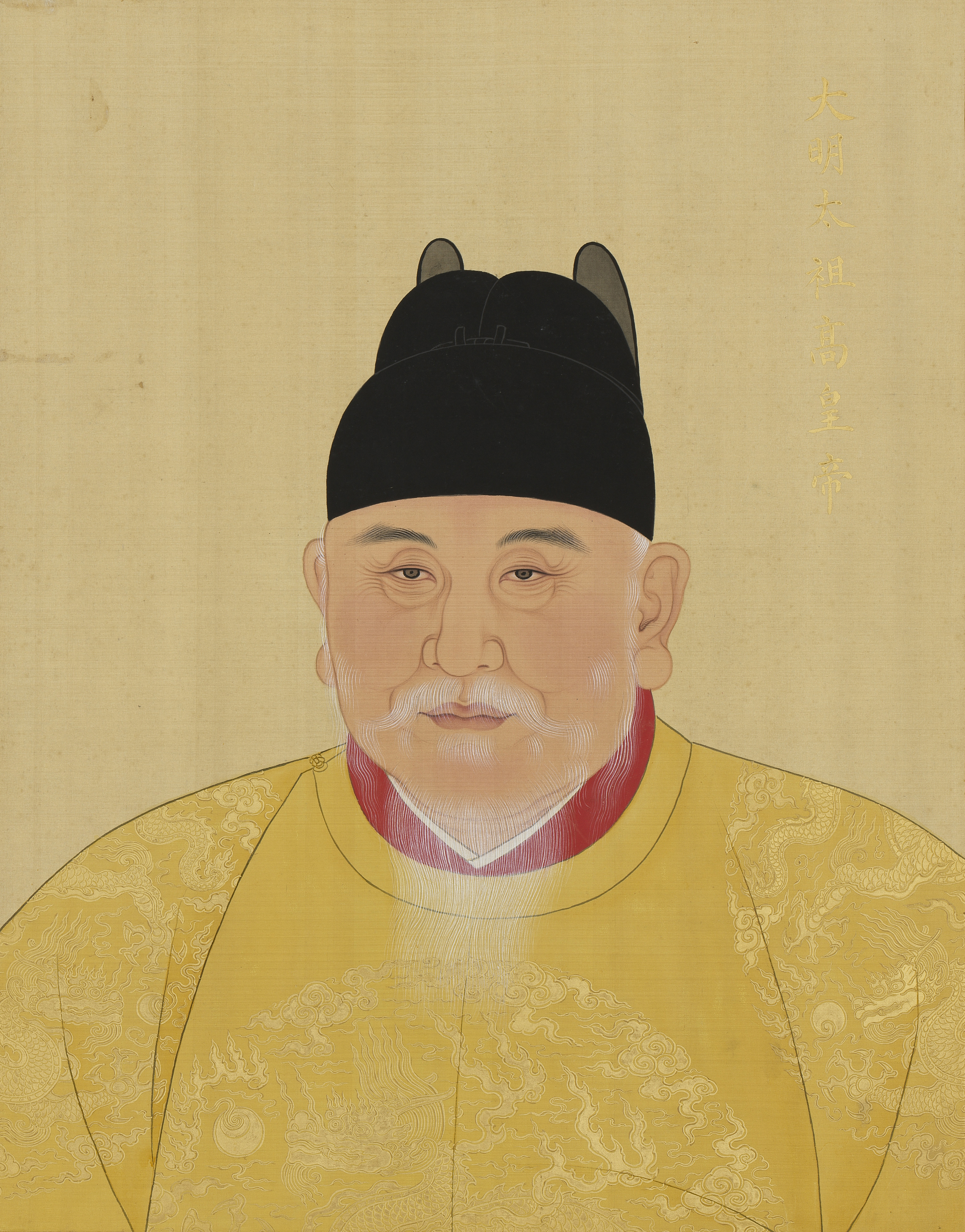
Emperor Zhu Yuanzhang in his old age, c. 1397

In Shen Defu's Wanli ye huo bian ("Unofficial Gleanings of the Wanli Era", 萬厲野獲編), it is recorded:

At the beginning of the Ming dynasty, teas from all over China were offered to the emperor, among which Jianning tea and Yángxiàn tea were the most highly valued. At that time, the Song dynasty production method was still in use, and all the tea offered was ground and kneaded with a medicine grinder into shapes known as lóngtuán (龍團, lit. 'lump of dragon'), both large and small. However, in September of the 24th year of Hongwu, the emperor discontinued the production of lóngtuán due to the heavy burden it placed on the people. Instead, he ordered that only tea buds be plucked and offered to the court. (Note: The original text is: "國初四方供茶，以建寧、陽羨茶品為上，時猶仍宋製，所進者俱碾而揉之，為大小龍團。至洪武二十四年九月，上以重勞民力，罷造龍團，惟采茶芽以進.")

With the prohibition of compressed tea, the powdered tea associated with it also fell into disuse in China.

In Japan, however, a tradition of powdered tea preparation was preserved. Through innovations such as shade cultivation of tea leaves (覆下栽培) and stone-milling, Japan eventually developed what is now known as matcha, which over time was deeply shaped by Japanese aesthetics and cultural principles.

Some historians have pointed out that, as the Ming dynasty emphasized agriculture and held a strong military ethos—and since the Hongwu Emperor himself had risen from the lowest social strata—he may have viewed the elaborate and refined nature of compressed tea with disdain.

=== Japan ===
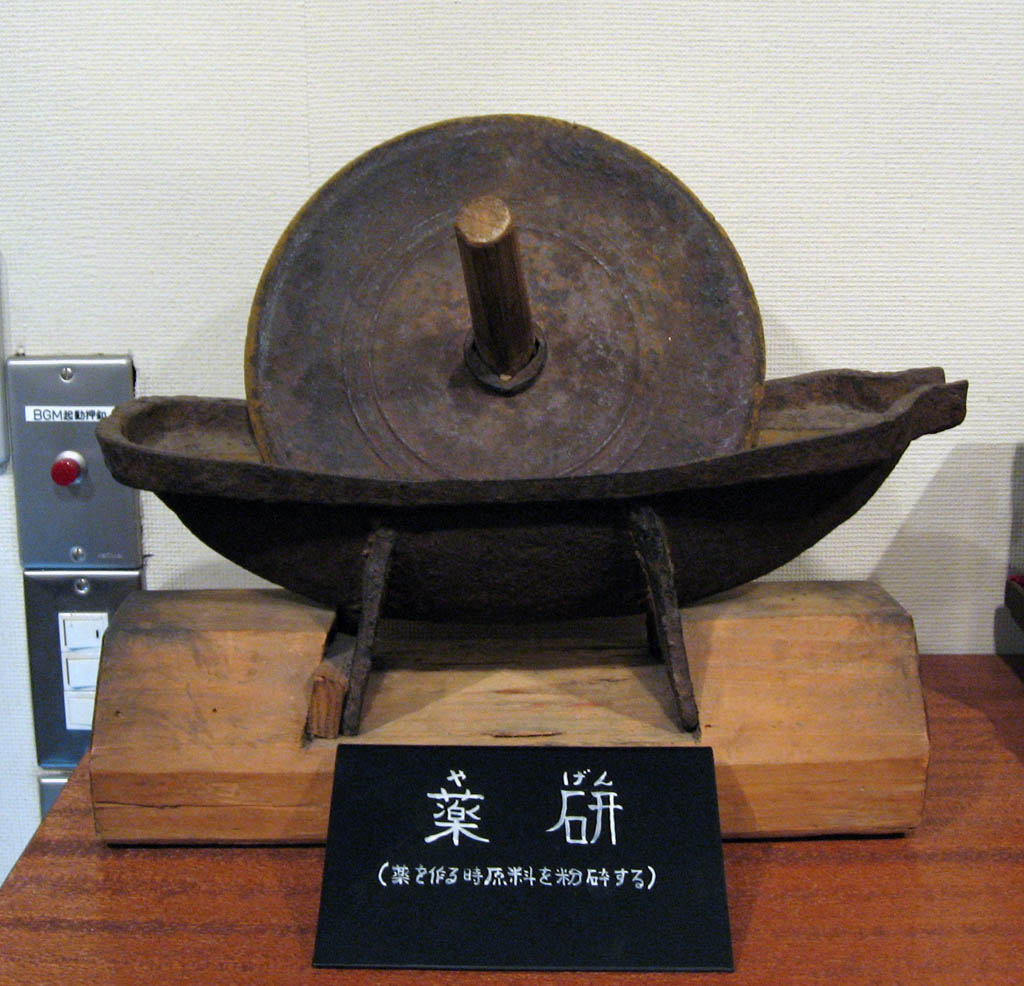
Yagen (藥研), meaning "Medicine Grindstone"

The earliest documented reference to tea in Japan appears in the 9th century, in an entry in the Nihon Kōki concerning the Buddhist monk Eichū (永忠), who is believed to have brought tea back from China. According to the entry, Eichū personally prepared and served sencha (煎茶) to Emperor Saga during an imperial excursion to Karasaki (in present-day Shiga Prefecture) in 815. This sencha is believed to have been Chinese compressed tea, rather than the modern form of sencha in which tea leaves are steeped in hot water for infusion.

In 816, by imperial order, tea plantations were established in the Kinki region. However, public interest in tea soon declined.

Powdered tea first arrived in Japan around the 12th century. It can be traced back to Tang dynasty China, where Chinese Zen (Chan) monks were the first to grind bricks of tea into fine powder with a pestle and mortar. Japanese monk Myoan Eisai traveled to China around the late 1180s, and encountered a drink at the temples there that the Chinese called as "mo cha", which involved pouring hot water over powdered tea and whisking it with a bamboo whisk. Eisai was credited to have brought back this Song dynasty style of tea preparation to Japan. In China, this practice of mo cha however faded over the next centuries during the Ming dynasty, but it continued in Japan, and become a key part of Japanese Zen Buddhist culture.

According to the Report of the 2020 Culture of Life Research Project (Tea Ceremony) published by the Government of Japan, they wrote;

During the Kamakura period, a new method of tea drinking—matcha (tencha)—was introduced by Chinese merchants visiting for trade or by monks who had studied in China... During this period, matcha was served by having guests hold a tenmoku bowl filled with powdered tea (matcha). Servants carrying a jōhei (tōbin) and a chasen (tea whisk) would circulate, pour hot water, and stir the mixture. This method of preparing tea was documented in Song Dynasty tea texts, such as Emperor Huizong's Grand Treatise on Tea, confirming it was existed during the Song Dynasty. The "Four-Head Tea Ceremony" performed at ancient Zen temples like Kennō-ji and Kennin-ji actually preserves this ancient form.

Eisai authored the Kissa Yōjōki (喫茶養生記; lit. 'Book of Drinking Tea for Health') and presented it to Minamoto no Sanetomo, the third shōgun of the Kamakura shogunate, in 1214. At the time, tea was regarded as a form of medicine. The Kissa Yōjōki describes the methods of tea preparation Eisai observed during his time in the Song dynasty. According to the text, tea leaves were plucked in the morning, steamed immediately, and then placed on a roasting rack to be left overnight. This method is believed to have been introduced to Japan at that time. However, a major difference is that modern matcha production omits the long roasting process, apart from drying for approximately 30 minutes. At the time, the tea was a brownish-black lump, rather than the bright green powder of modern matcha. It is thought that this lump tea was ground into powder and consumed in a manner similar to modern matcha.

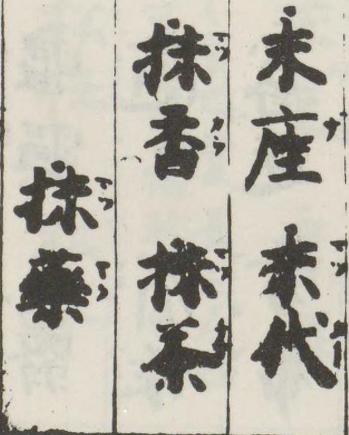
Characters for matcha (抹茶) in the Japanese dictionary Unpo Iroha Shū (1548)

In Japan, illustrations of "matcha jars" (抹茶壺, in this case referring to tea caddies) appear in the Kundaikan sōchōki (君台観左右帳記, literally "Record of Appraising Objects for the Lord’s Viewing Stand"), a Muromachi-period manual on art connoisseurship and interior decoration compiled by the art connoisseurs Nōami and Sōami for the shogun Ashikaga Yoshimasa. The "Nōami-bon" (1476) and "Sōami-bon" (1511) versions of this text both include such illustrations, indicating that the term matcha (抹茶) was already in use in the late 15th century. Furthermore, in the oldest surviving manuscript of the Sōami-bon, the "Tōhoku University manuscript" (dated to 1559, the second year of Eiroku), the characters 抹茶 are glossed with the phonetic reading "Surichatsubo" (スリチヤツホ), indicating that the word may originally have been pronounced suricha rather than matcha.

The characters for matcha (抹茶) also appear in the Japanese dictionary Unpo Iroha Shū (1548), compiled during the Muromachi period. The Book of Agriculture (1313) by Wang Zhen (fl. 1290–1333) of the Yuan dynasty includes the terms mòchá (末茶) and mòzichá (末子茶). One theory suggests that these words were adopted and transformed into the term "matcha" in Japan. However, as this book was published about a century after Eisai, no documentary evidence confirms whether these terms were introduced to Japan or evolved into "matcha" by the 16th century.

Moreover, whether read as matcha or suricha, the term 抹茶 literally means "tea that has been ground". In contrast, the terms 末茶 (mòchá) and 末子茶 (mòzichá) mean "tea reduced to powder," and thus differ not only in characters and pronunciation, but also in meaning.

Eisai's disciple, the monk Myōe (1173–1232), received a tea urn containing seeds from Eisai and established a tea plantation in Togano'o, Kyoto, by sowing them there. During the Kamakura period (1185–1333), Togano'o tea was known as honcha (本茶; lit. 'real tea'), while teas from other regions were referred to as hicha (非茶; lit. 'non-tea'). Togano'o tea gained the highest reputation at the time. Myōe also established tea plantations in Uji, Kyoto, which subsequently became Japan's foremost tea-producing region.

==== Popularization and refinement of matcha ====
In Japan, matcha became an important item at Zen monasteries and was highly valued by the upper classes from the 14th to the 16th centuries. Until the 13th century, matcha was made by grinding tea leaves with a grinder called a yagen (薬研), but the particles were rough and coarse in texture. In the 14th century, however, a stone mill specialized for tea appeared, producing finer powder and improving the quality of matcha.

During the Muromachi period (1336–1573), tea spread among the general public. Among the elite, it became fashionable to drink tea using expensive Chinese ceramics known as karamono (唐物; lit. 'Tang Dynasty things'). In the 16th century, however, tea masters such as Murata Jukō and Sen no Rikyū emphasized simplicity, giving rise to the Japanese tea ceremony. This practice prioritized introspection over ostentation and came to favor simple utensils. The wabi-sabi aesthetic, which finds beauty in modesty, simplicity, and imperfection, became closely associated with the tea ceremony.

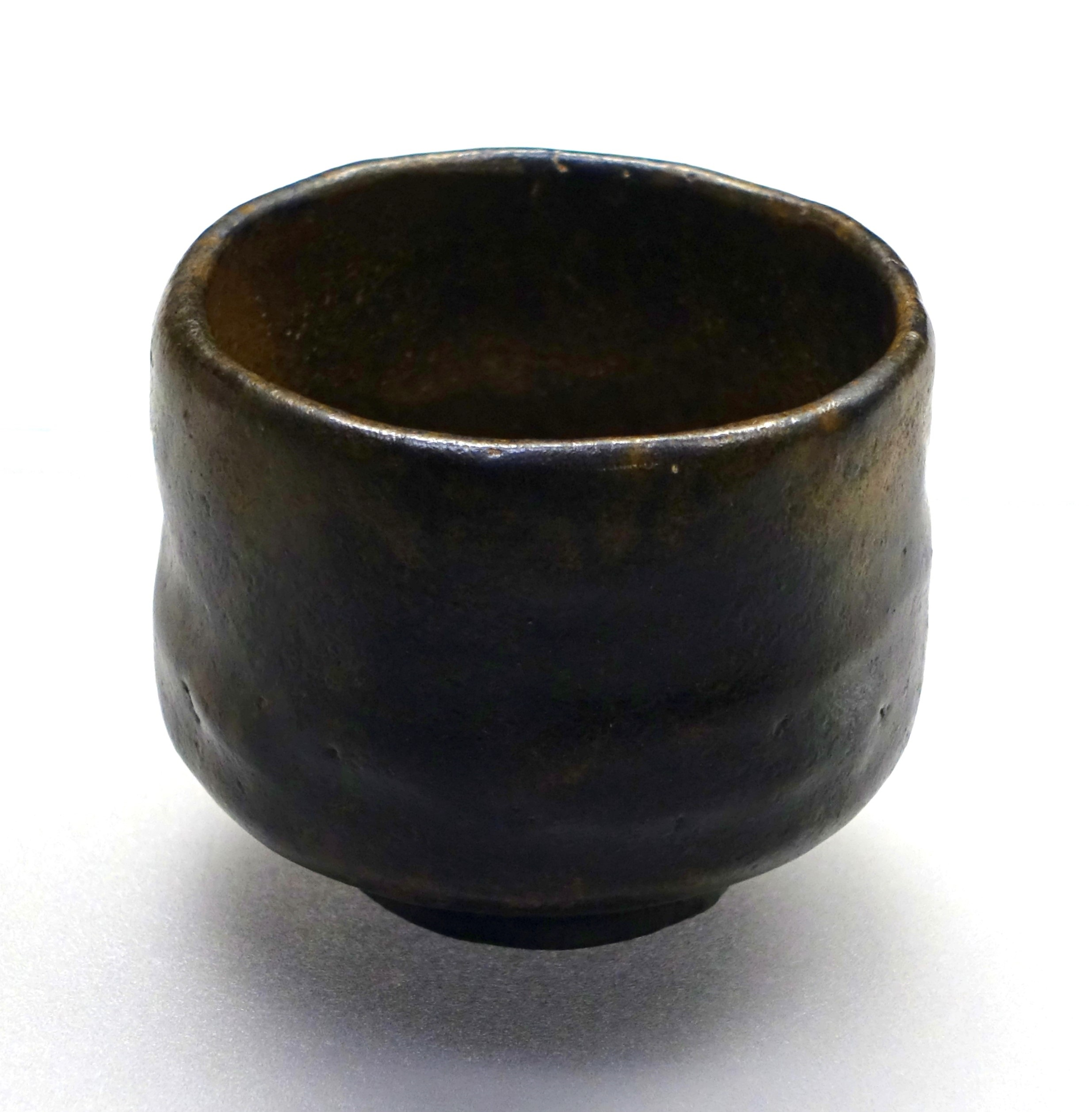
Tea bowl, known as Suehiro, studio of Chōjirō

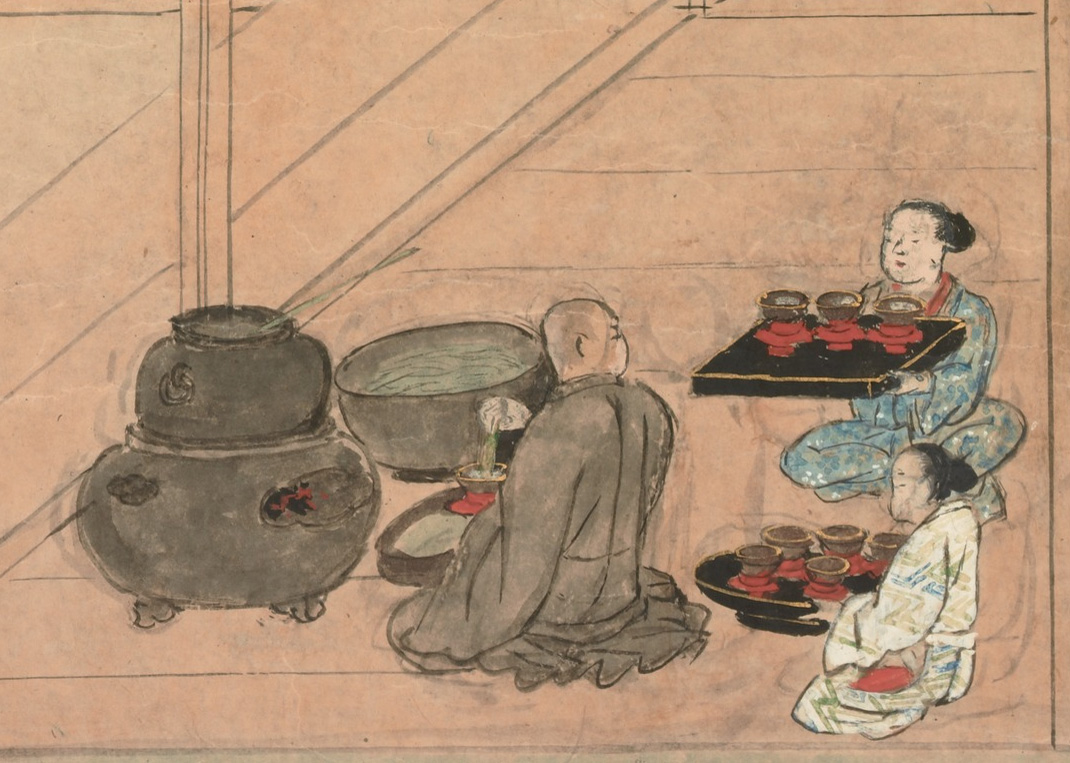
The part of "Making tea" from the Picture Scroll of the Origin of Kiyomizu-dera Temple, 1517

It was long believed that the practice of growing tea plants under shade by covering them with straw or reeds began in Japan in the late 16th century. For example, the Portuguese missionary João Rodrigues Tçuzu, who arrived in Japan in 1577, wrote about shaded cultivation in his 1604 work, History of the Japanese Church (Historia da Igreja do Japão). However, recent soil analyses of Uji tea plantations suggest that the practice began in the first half of the 15th century at the latest.

This technique, originally intended to protect tea sprouts from frost damage, led to the development of a unique Japanese matcha (tencha) that was bright green and had a distinctive aroma and flavor. By limiting exposure to sunlight, photosynthesis in the leaves is inhibited, preventing the conversion of theanine—a component responsible for umami—into tannins, which cause bitterness and astringency. As a result, the tea leaves retain a higher umami content. Shaded cultivation also increases the concentration of chlorophyll in the leaves, resulting in a vibrant green color. Until then, matcha introduced from China was brown in color—hence the Japanese word for "brown", 茶色 (chairo), literally means "tea color".

==== Traditions ====
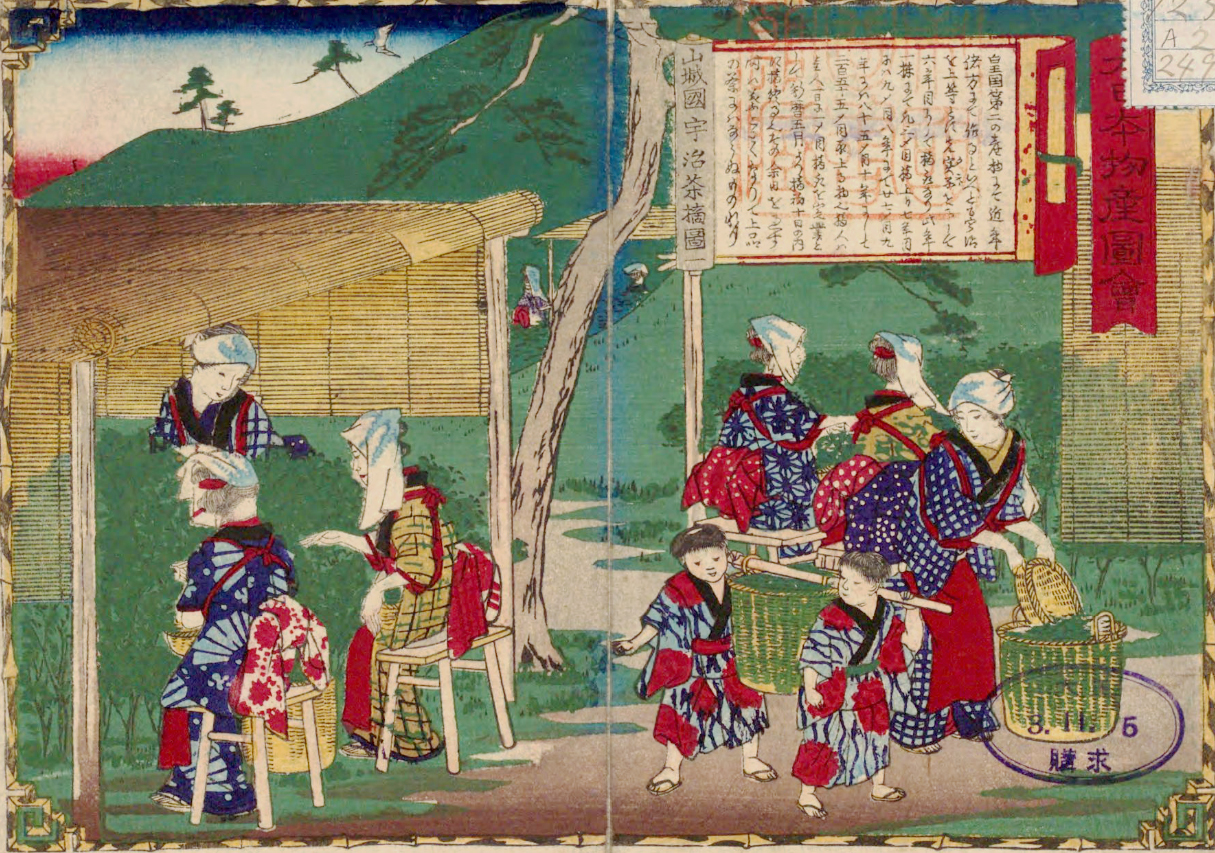
Ukiyo-e depicting tea picking in Uji, Kyoto. The painting was made by Hiroshige III (1842–1894).

Since the Muromachi period, the term tea master (茶師, chashi) referred to tea manufacturers and sellers. During the Edo period (1603–1867), it came to refer specifically to the official tea masters (御用茶師, goyō chashi) of Uji, Kyoto, whose status was guaranteed by the Tokugawa shogunate. Uji tea masters were divided into three ranks: gomotsu tea masters (御物茶師, gomotsu chashi), ofukuro tea masters (御袋茶師, ofukuro chashi), and otōri tea masters (御通茶師, otōri chashi). They were permitted to use their family names and carry swords like samurai. They dealt exclusively with the shogun, the imperial court, and feudal lords, and did not sell tea to commoners. Shaded cultivation of tea was permitted only for Uji tea masters, who held a monopoly on the production of high-grade matcha and gyokuro (premium sencha).

The oldest known brand of matcha is Baba Mukashi (祖母昔; lit. 'grandmother's old days'). "Grandmother" refers to Myōshūni (妙秀尼, d. 1598), daughter of Rokkaku Yoshikata, who married Kanbayashi Hisashige. She was affectionately called "Baba" by Tokugawa Ieyasu. Myōshūni was skilled in tea preparation, and Ieyasu often drank her tea. The matcha made using her method was named Baba Mukashi and was later served to the shogun. According to one theory, the name Baba Mukashi was bestowed by Ieyasu himself.

Other well-known brands included Hatsu Mukashi (初昔; lit. 'first old days') and Ato Mukashi (後昔; lit. 'later old days'), both of which were also presented to the shogun. Taka no Tsume (鷹の爪; lit. 'hawk's claw') and Shiro (白; lit. 'white') were also well-known.

At the time, matcha was shipped in tea jars filled with tencha (unground leaf tea), which was later ground into powder using a tea grinder. The event of transporting tea jars from Uji to Edo (now Tokyo) for presentation to the shogun was called the Ochatsubo Dōchū (御茶壺道中; lit. 'tea jar journey'), and even feudal lords were required to stand aside when the procession passed. The tradition continued from 1633 until 1866, near the end of the Edo period.

==== Modern developments ====
Following the Meiji Restoration in 1868, Japan underwent rapid modernization and political restructuring. As the feudal system was abolished and the power of the shogunate dissolved, the traditional clientele for matcha—including the shogun, feudal lords, and imperial court nobles—disappeared. This led to a sharp decline in the cultural and economic significance of matcha, which had long been a symbol of elite refinement and ceremonial practice.

Tea producers in Uji, who had enjoyed exclusive rights to shaded cultivation and the production of tencha, lost their privileged position in the industry. Until then, only authorized Uji tea masters had been permitted to grow tea under shade and supply the high-quality leaves used for matcha and gyokuro. With the end of these monopolistic privileges, shaded cultivation techniques gradually spread to other regions of Japan, allowing tea farmers outside Uji to produce tencha as well.

Despite this shift, the industry adapted through technological advancements and modernization. One notable development was the invention of the tencha dryer (碾茶乾燥機, tencha kansōki) during the Taishō (1912–1926) to early Shōwa (1926–1989) periods. These machines used radiant heat to efficiently dry steamed tea leaves, significantly improving product quality compared to the earlier hoiro (焙炉) method, which used charcoal-fired hearths and paper supports to dry the leaves by hand.

The establishment of research institutions, such as the Kyoto Prefectural Tea Industry Research Institute (京都府茶業研究所), further contributed to the modernization and quality improvement of matcha production.

Throughout the 20th century, matcha remained central to the practice of the Japanese tea ceremony, preserved by major tea schools such as Urasenke and Omotesenke. Its role in cultural education expanded through school tea ceremony clubs and public workshops, maintaining its status as a traditional beverage in Japan.

It has been adopted into various products such as matcha lattes, desserts, and confections. The term "matcha" has become widely recognized globally, and Japanese producers have promoted exports of high-quality matcha under regional brands, particularly from Uji, Nishio, and Shizuoka Prefecture.

As demand grows, concerns have also emerged about maintaining quality standards and ensuring the authenticity of Japanese matcha. Both the public and private sectors are working to preserve traditional production methods and promote environmentally sustainable cultivation practices.

In recent years, some Kyoto-based tea companies have implemented purchase limits on premium matcha due to supply constraints, particularly of first-flush matcha, which was historically reserved for tea ceremonies but is now widely consumed overseas.

The labor-intensive nature of production, limited grinding capacity, and a shrinking number of tea farmers have added further strain to the supply chain. In response, both government and industry stakeholders are exploring policy reforms, subsidies, and regional diversification to protect traditional cultivation and meet ongoing international demand.

In 2025, Matcha became more popular in Thailand, and its international popularity was seen as part of a trend for "affordable luxury" products.

=== United States ===
Matcha likely first entered the U.S. market through Japanese grocery stores in cities with large Japanese populations, particularly Los Angeles and San Francisco. While initially available through specialty importers and Japanese markets, matcha remained relatively obscure in mainstream American culture for decades. The powdered green tea began gaining significant traction in the early 2000s when specialty brands started targeting health food retailers including Whole Foods Market. The beverage's photogenic bright green color proved particularly well-suited to social media platforms like Instagram and TikTok, helping it gain viral popularity among wellness enthusiasts and influencers. Major coffee chains including Starbucks and Dunkin' Donuts subsequently added matcha lattes and other matcha-based drinks to their permanent menus, cementing its place in American café culture, with countless U.S.-based brands popping up, including matcha-focused brands like Jade Leaf, Kettl, Shinzo Matcha, and Encha Matcha, and lifestyle brands offering matcha options like Chamberlain Coffee.

Because of the increased demand, a matcha shortage ensued in Japan. Major Japanese producers including Marukyu Koyamaen and Ippodo announced limited availability or suspended sales of matcha products in late 2024, with the 2025 harvest yielding 20% less than the previous year. The shortage was further complicated when the United States imposed new 15% tariffs on Japanese imports in August 2025, compounding already-doubled wholesale prices and raising ethical questions about whether Western consumer trends were placing unsustainable pressure on traditional Japanese tea farming practices.

=== Australia ===
A 2026 report found that matcha consumption in Australia increased by 133% year-over-year. The Guardian described the drink as having become a "staple" in the country. This has been linked to a global increase in matcha popularity driven by social media.

== Characteristics ==
The characteristics of matcha are as follows:

- Color: bright green, might be dark green depending on which leaves are used
- Flavor: strong umami flavor
- Aroma: unique ooikou (覆い香), like green laver

The characteristic bright green color is due to the increased chloroplasts that the plants need to collect more light in the shade. The flavor of matcha is dominated by its amino acids. The ooikou aroma is due to the matcha's dimethyl sulfide content.

Green tea is more umami oriented than black tea and the matcha form is particularly rich in umami flavor with twice the amino acids (the source of umami) as sencha green tea. The amino acids, theanine, succinic acid, gallic acid, and theogallin are the primary contributors to matcha's umami flavor. The growing of tencha, which serves as the material for producing matcha, relies on the tencha plant being grown in shade, therefore, not breaking down the content of theanine on the leaves. Shading increases the amount of caffeine and total free amino acids but also reduces the accumulation of catechins in leaves.

Matcha tea contains polyphenols, including high amounts of chlorogenic acid. Like all tea, matcha naturally contains oxalates. Research, published in Soil Science and Plant Nutrition journal, found that shading, a cultivation method that is used in the production of matcha, may increase oxalate concentration. The study further suggests that oxalate concentration in matcha may be higher than in unshaded teas like sencha.

Different type of colored Matcha's also exist , although matcha is traditionally known for its green appearance. It's color can vary depending on the tea leaf cultivars used. These differences in appearance are associated with various of flavors as well. For example , Purple matcha uses higher concentration caffeine and anthocyanin related compounds that result of a more bitter and dry taste ,and astringent feeling. Yellow matcha is known for higher levels of total amino acids and Theanine , resulting in a smoother and mellow taste.

== Production ==
The majority of matcha is produced in Japan, where it is highly regarded as part of the tea ceremony (chanoyu (茶の湯)) as well as used in sweets, baking, and confections. China and Vietnam also produce some matcha intended for export. This is a more recent modern development, and their production methods may differ significantly from the traditional Japanese method.

In Japanese production, the leaves of tencha are steamed and dried to prevent any further oxidation. It is usually steamed at 100 °C (212 °F) for 10–15 seconds. The steaming softens the tea leaves and deactivates the oxidizing enzymes. The leaves are then dried in a tea processing machine and spread on a conveyor belt. The temperature inside the machine is set to approximately 170–200 °C (338–392 °F) in the drying process, but the temperature of the tea leaves themselves is around 70 °C. This leads to the suppression of glycosides.

After drying, the tencha is aged for several months in cool, dry conditions, and blended by expert tasters. The leaves are then ground in a grinding mill to make matcha.

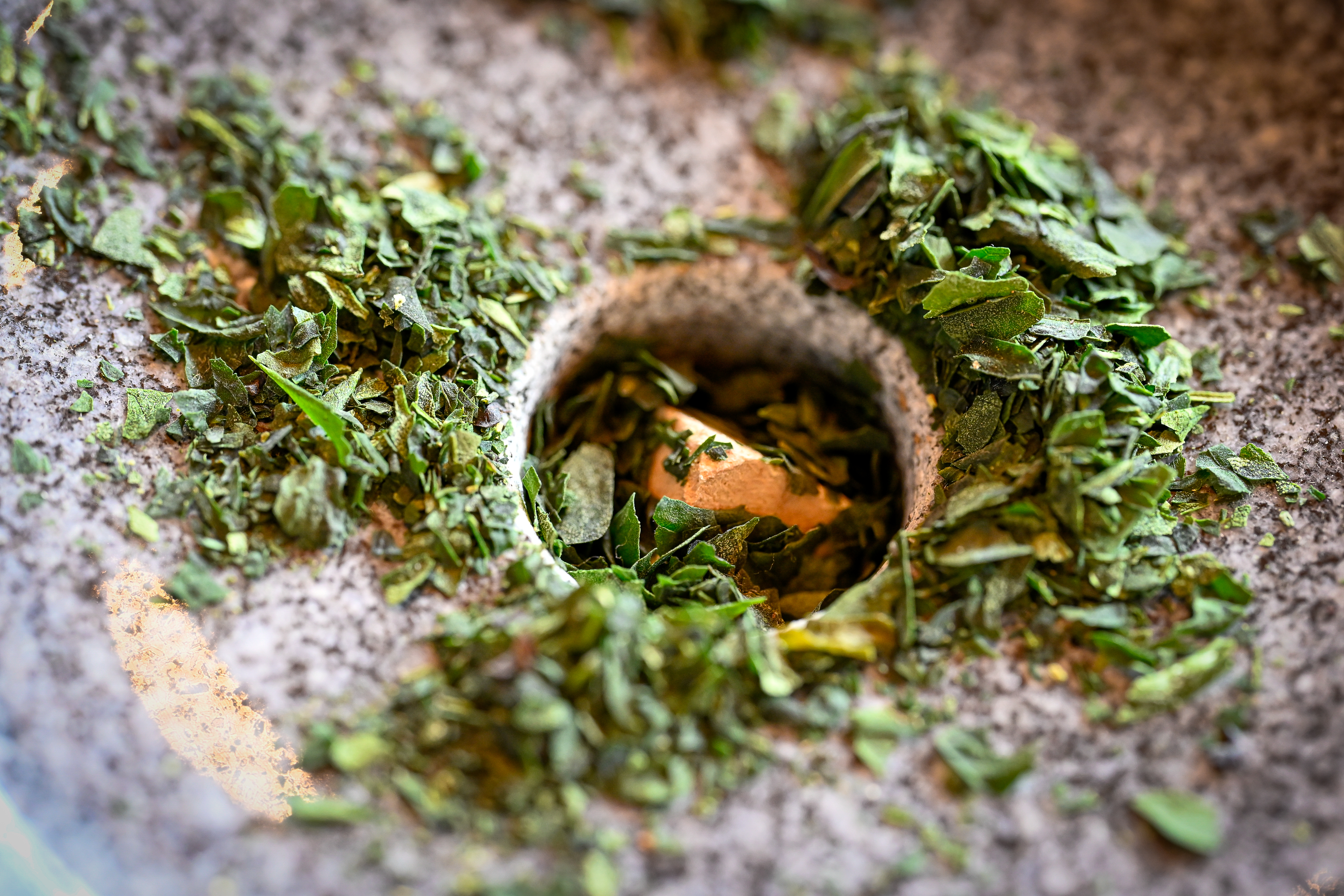
Tencha on traditional stone mill in Uji Japan

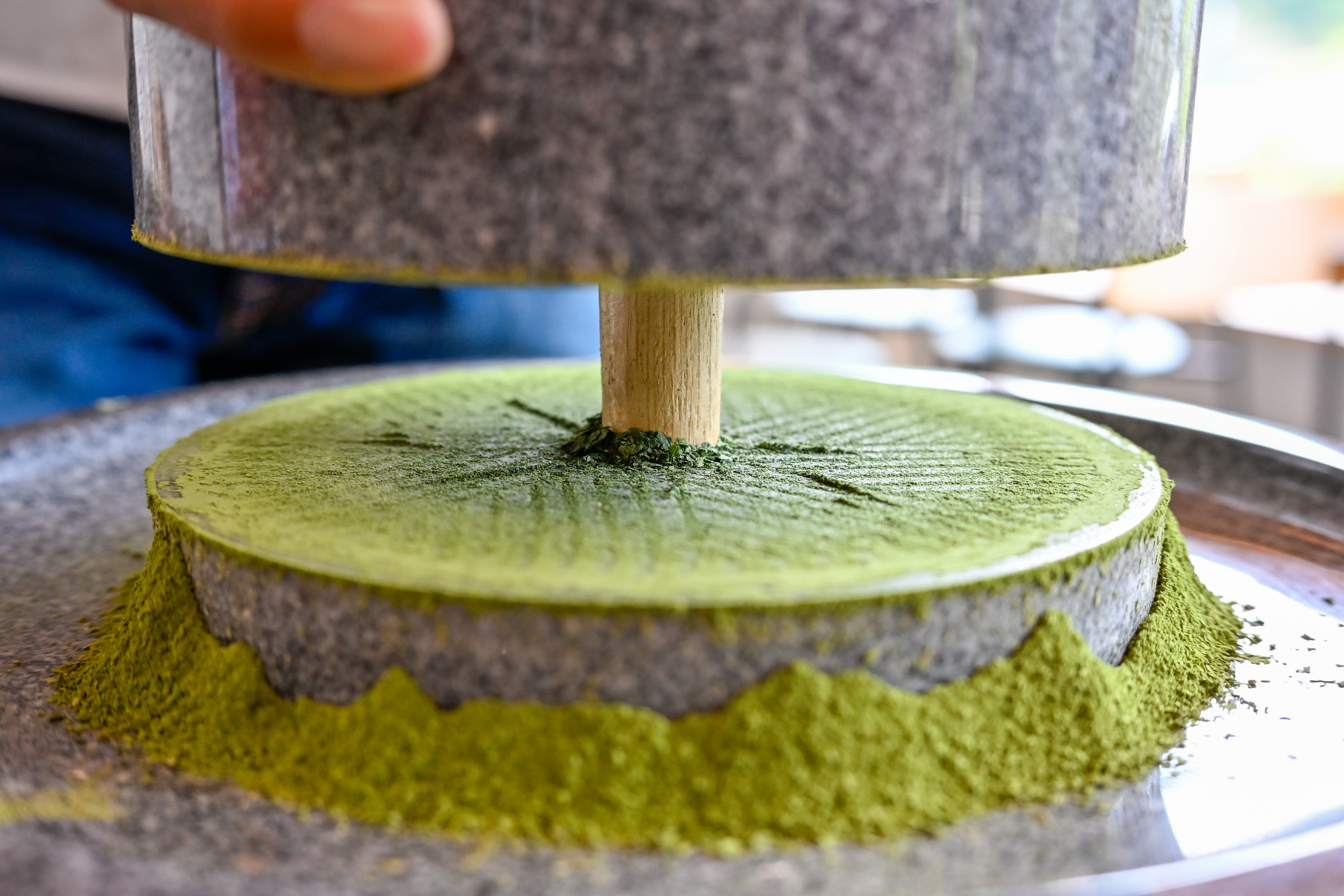
Close-up of a traditional granite stone mill grinding tencha leaves into fine matcha powder.

In the past, the prepared tea leaves would be ground by hand in a single-purpose stone mill, which produces a finer grind than those used for grain and pulse flours, but today matcha producers use mechanically turned stone mills – the slow speed of grinding and use of cool grinding rooms prevents heating the tea and deteriorating the quality.

== Preparation ==
Matcha is typically consumed by mixing with hot water. There are two kinds of matcha tea – koicha (濃茶) and usucha (薄茶). Koicha is made by higher-grade matcha and less hot water with a lower temperature than for usucha. Usucha is foamed to reduce astringency while koicha is not foamed. Specifically, koicha is made from 4 g (0.14 oz) matcha and 30 ml (1.1 imp fl oz; 1.0 US fl oz) of hot water at 80 °C (176 °F), and usucha is made with half matcha in twice the volume of hot water at 90 °C (194 °F). Due to the above differences, koicha has more of an original taste of matcha than usucha.

=== In Japanese ceremony ===
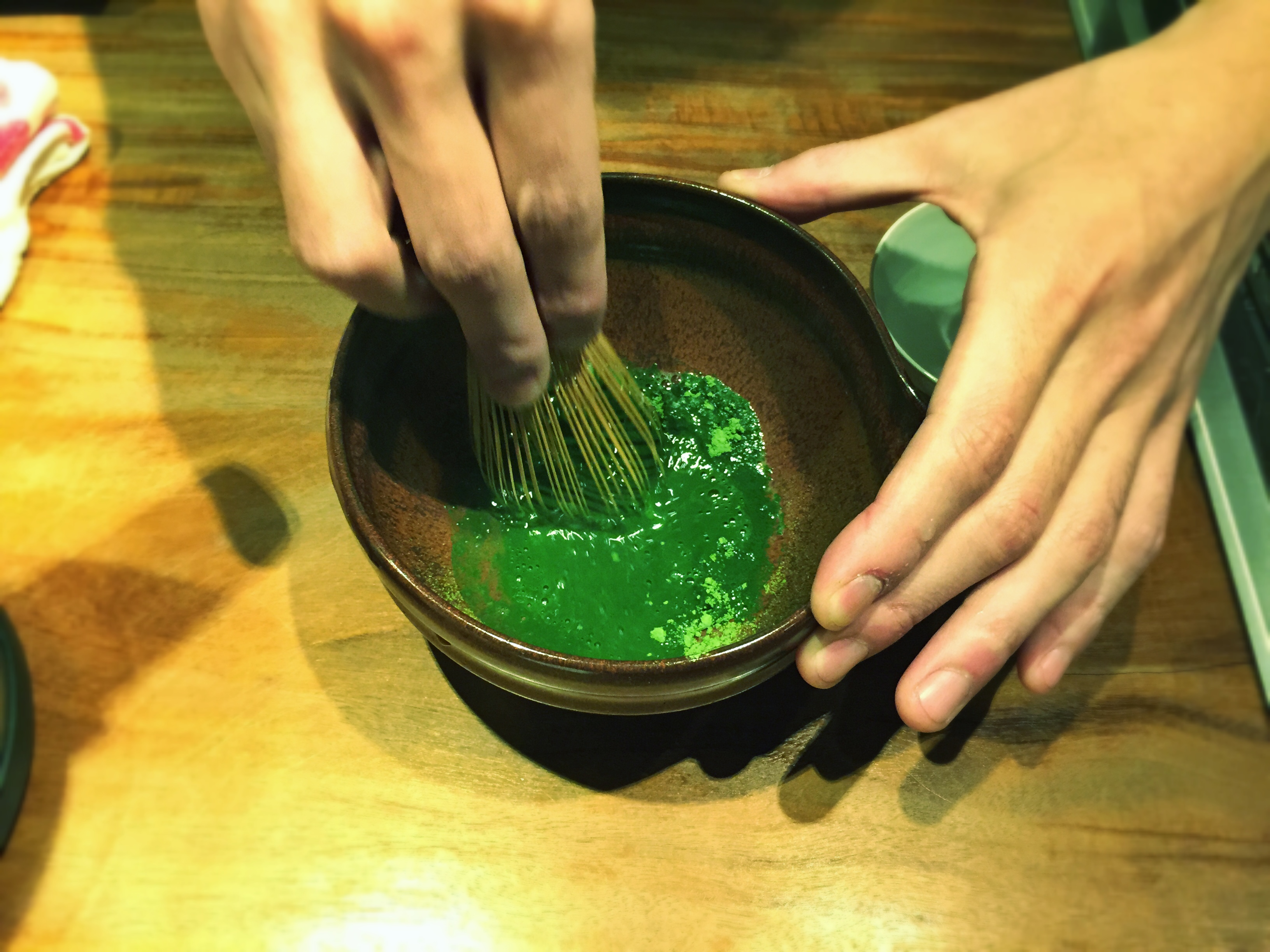
Koicha stirred with chasen in a chawan

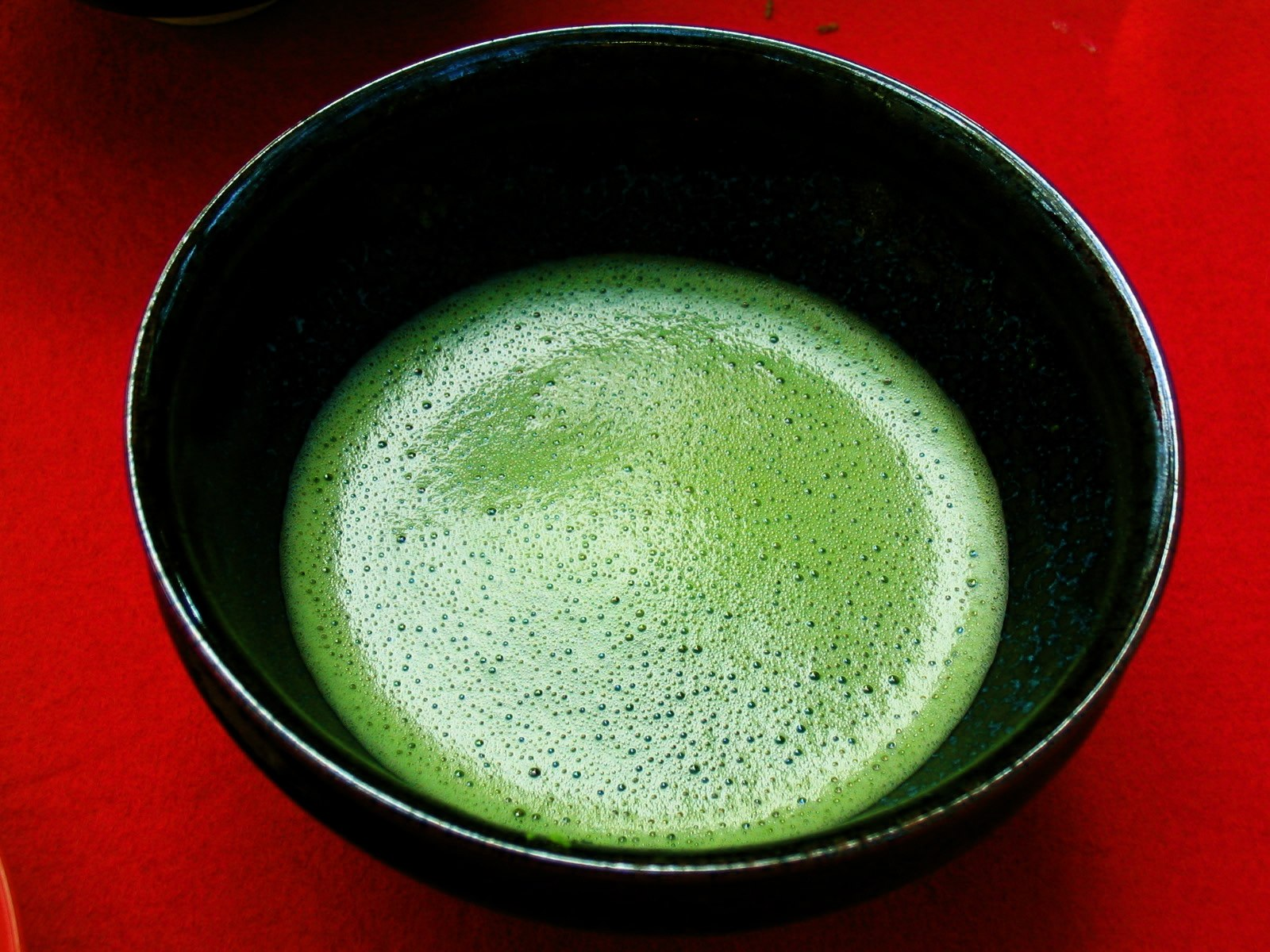
Usucha

Drinking koicha is considered the main part of Japanese tea ceremony, while drinking usucha is considered as a sub-part of it. In the ceremonies, matcha is stored and made using a special teaware called chaki. Specifically, matcha for koicha and usucha are stored in special containers named chaire (茶入) and natsume (棗) respectively. Before use, the matcha can be sifted through a sieve to reduce clumps. Matcha is scooped out from these containers by chashaku (茶杓), a traditional Japanese spoon. Matcha and hot water are then put in a chawan (茶碗), the bowl, and stirred with chasen (茶筅), a whisk usually made from bamboo. It is drunk from the chawan. One drinks matcha after finishing (not during) eating sweets to allow a prolonged taste of the matcha.

Tools related to Japanese tea ceremony

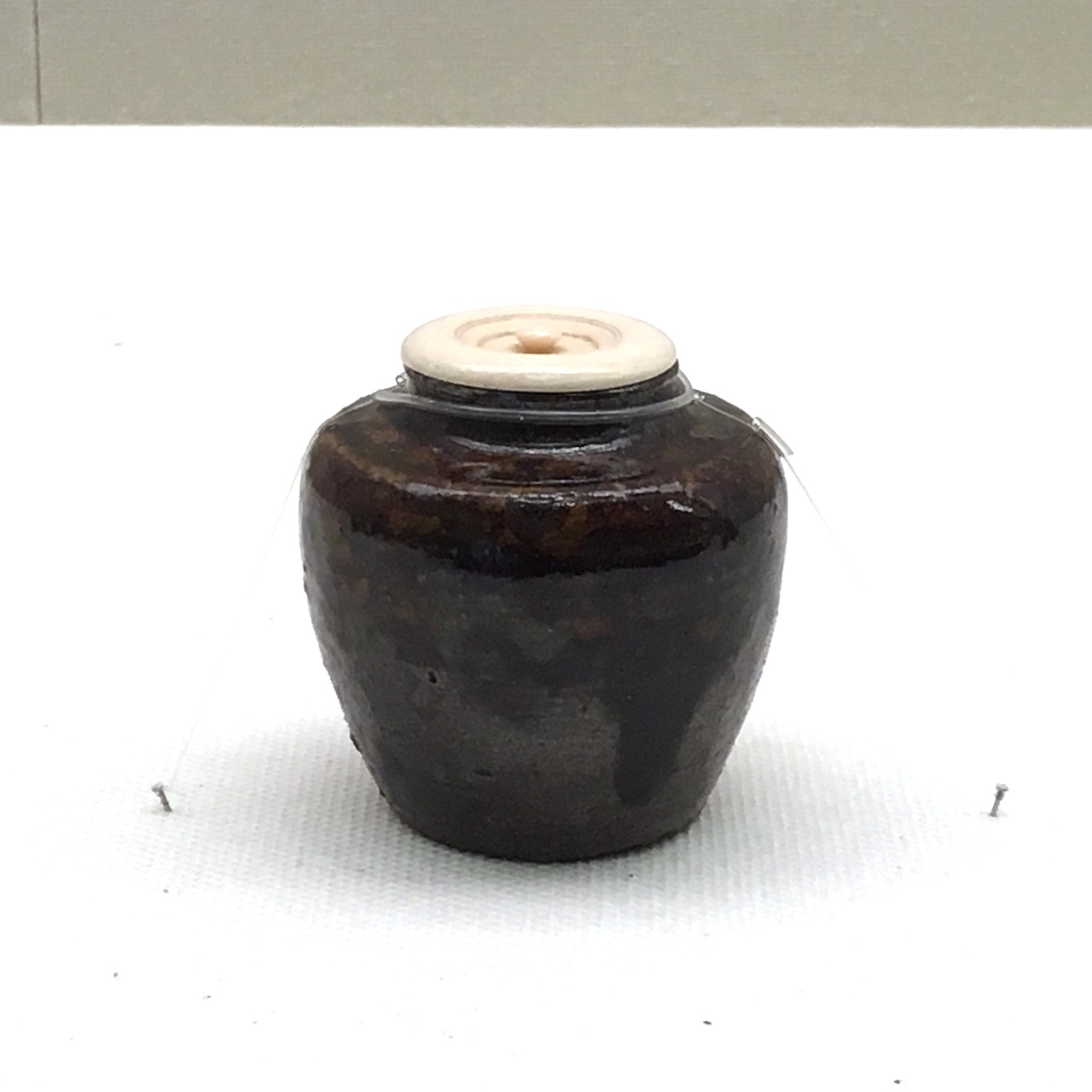
Chaire

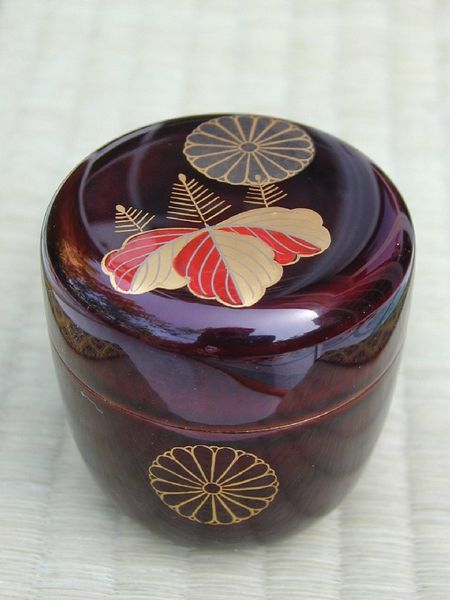
Natsume

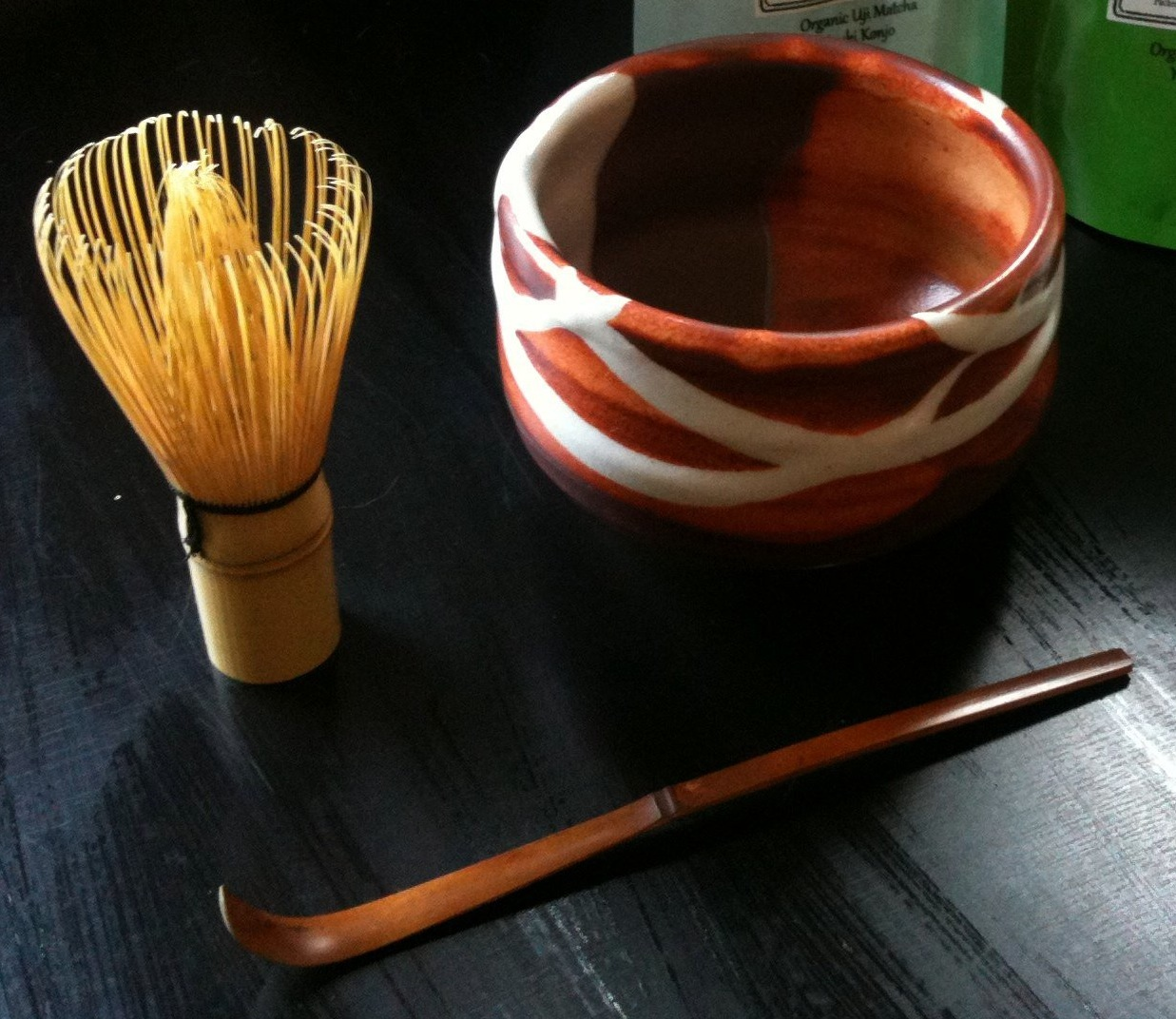
Upper left: chasen, upper right: chawan, lower right: chashaku

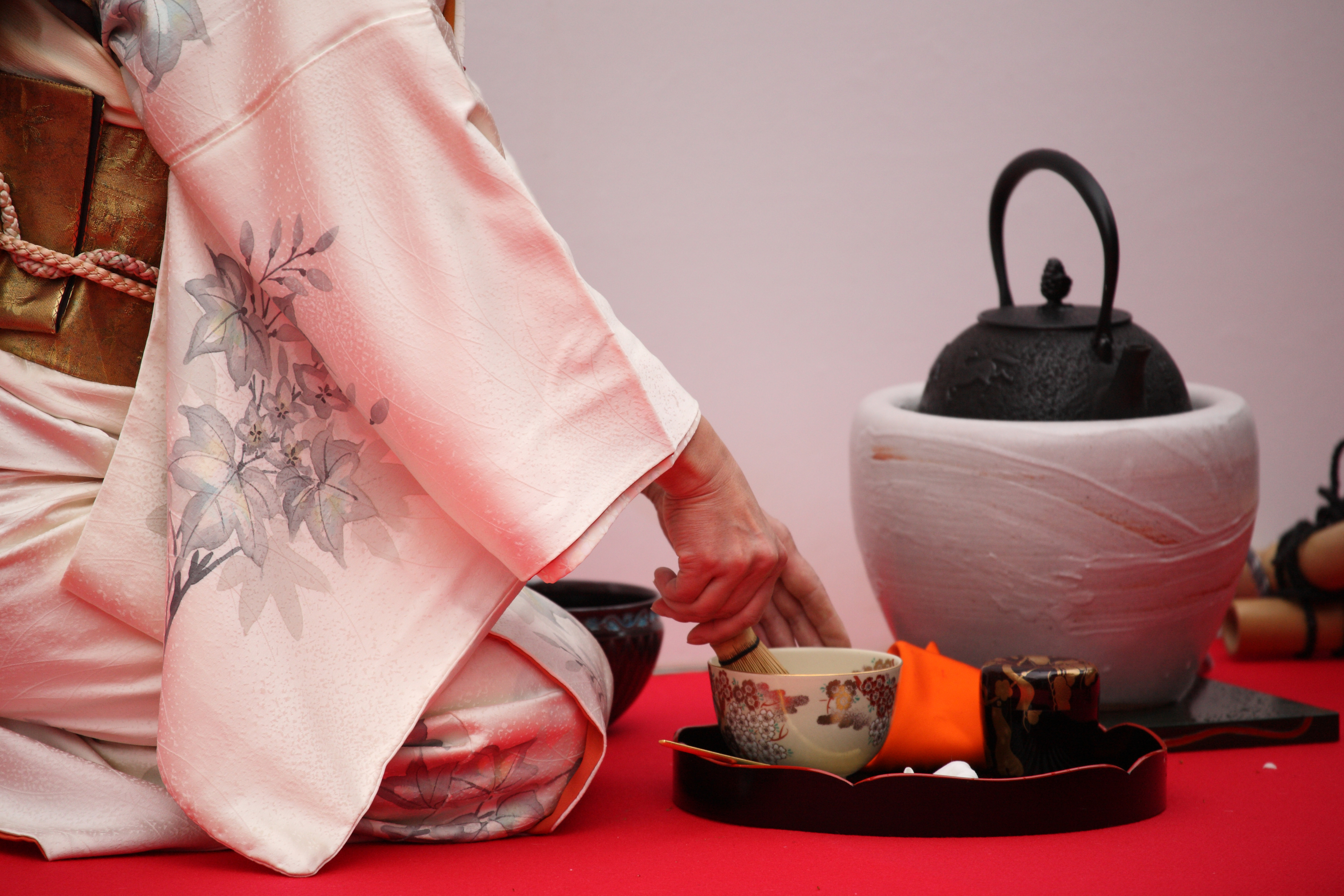
A hostess prepares matcha during a Japanese outdoor tea ceremony.

== Difference from other Japanese green tea ==
There are several types of powdered Japanese green tea and the differences are as follows.

Differences in Japanese powdered green tea types
Name	Feature	How to drink
matcha (抹茶)	Tea grown in the shade, steamed, and dried without being rolled and ground to a fine powder	Drink by mixing with hot water
matcha hōjicha	Hōjicha (charcoal roasted green tea) that has been powdered into matcha	Drink by mixing with hot water
funmatsucha (粉末茶)	A powdered green tea that does not use tencha, instead other Japanese greens are used, like kabusecha.	Drink by mixing with hot water
konacha (粉茶)	Leftover dust, leaves and bits from the green tea production process, which is sieved during the finishing process. Less expensive than other green teas.	Drink using a teapot or a tea strainer
instant tea (インスタントティー)	Water-soluble component extracted from green tea, concentrated, dried, and made into powder	Drink tea dissolved in hot water

All of the above ones are made from Camellia sinensis var. sinensis (Chinese, small-leaf tea).

== Other uses ==
Matcha (or funmatsucha under the name of "matcha") is used in castella, manjū, and monaka; as a topping for shaved ice (kakigōri); mixed with milk and sugar as a drink; and mixed with salt and used to flavor tempura in a mixture known as matcha-jio. It is also used as flavoring in many Western-style chocolates, candy, and desserts, such as cakes and pastries, including Swiss rolls and cheesecake, cookies, chou à la crème, castella, pudding, mousse, and green tea ice cream. Matcha frozen yogurt is sold in shops and can be made at home using Greek yogurt. Matcha cookies are also a popular frozen yogurt topping in Japan. The snacks Pocky and Kit Kat have matcha-flavoured versions in Japan. It may also be mixed into other forms of tea. For example, it is added to genmaicha to form matcha-iri genmaicha (literally, roasted brown rice and green tea with added matcha).

The use of matcha in modern drinks has also spread to North American cafés, such as Starbucks, which introduced "green tea lattes" and other matcha-flavored drinks after they became successful in their Japanese store locations. As in Japan, it has become integrated into matcha lattes, iced drinks, milkshakes, and smoothies.

Matcha used as an ingredient

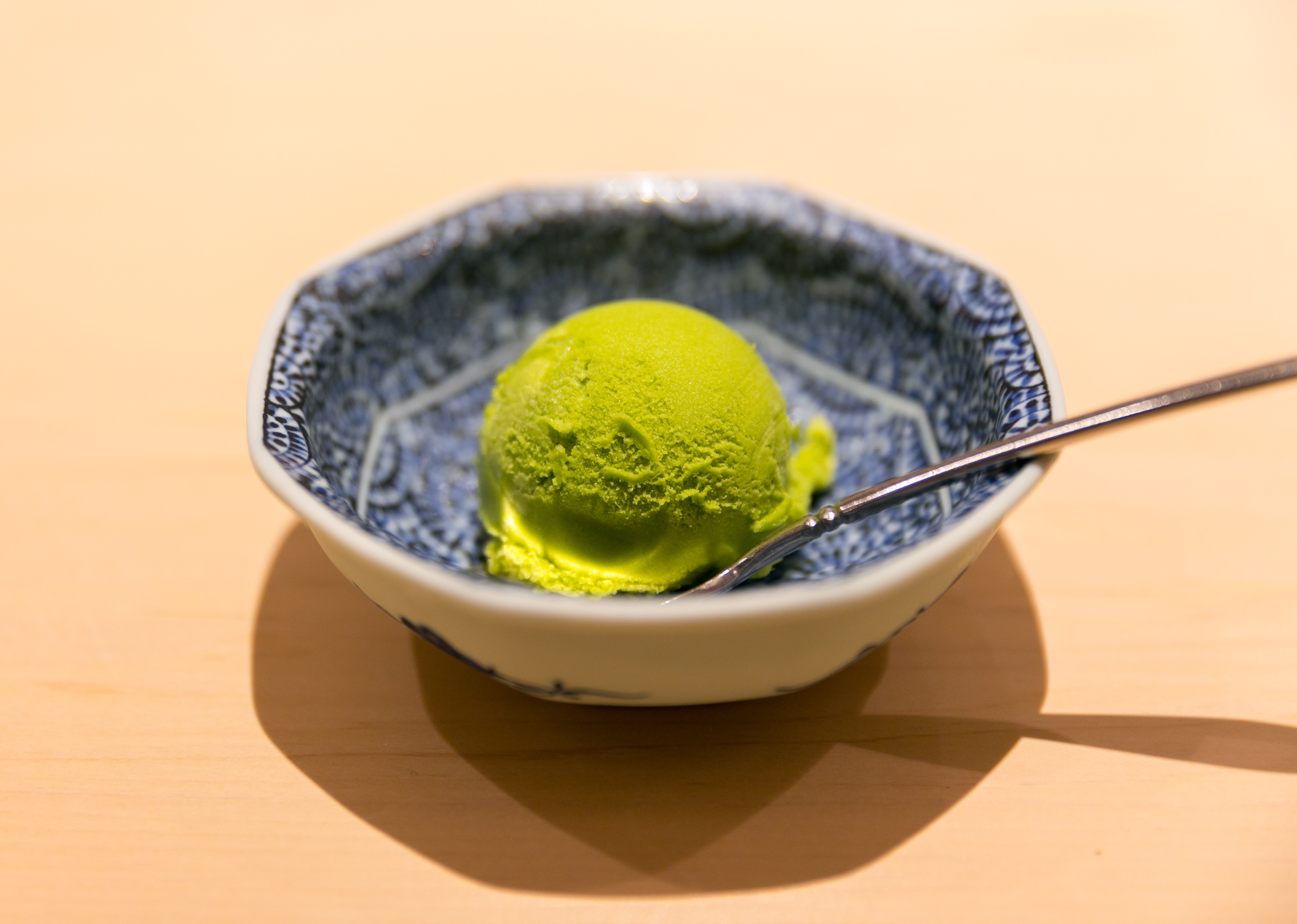
Matcha ice cream at a restaurant in Tokyo

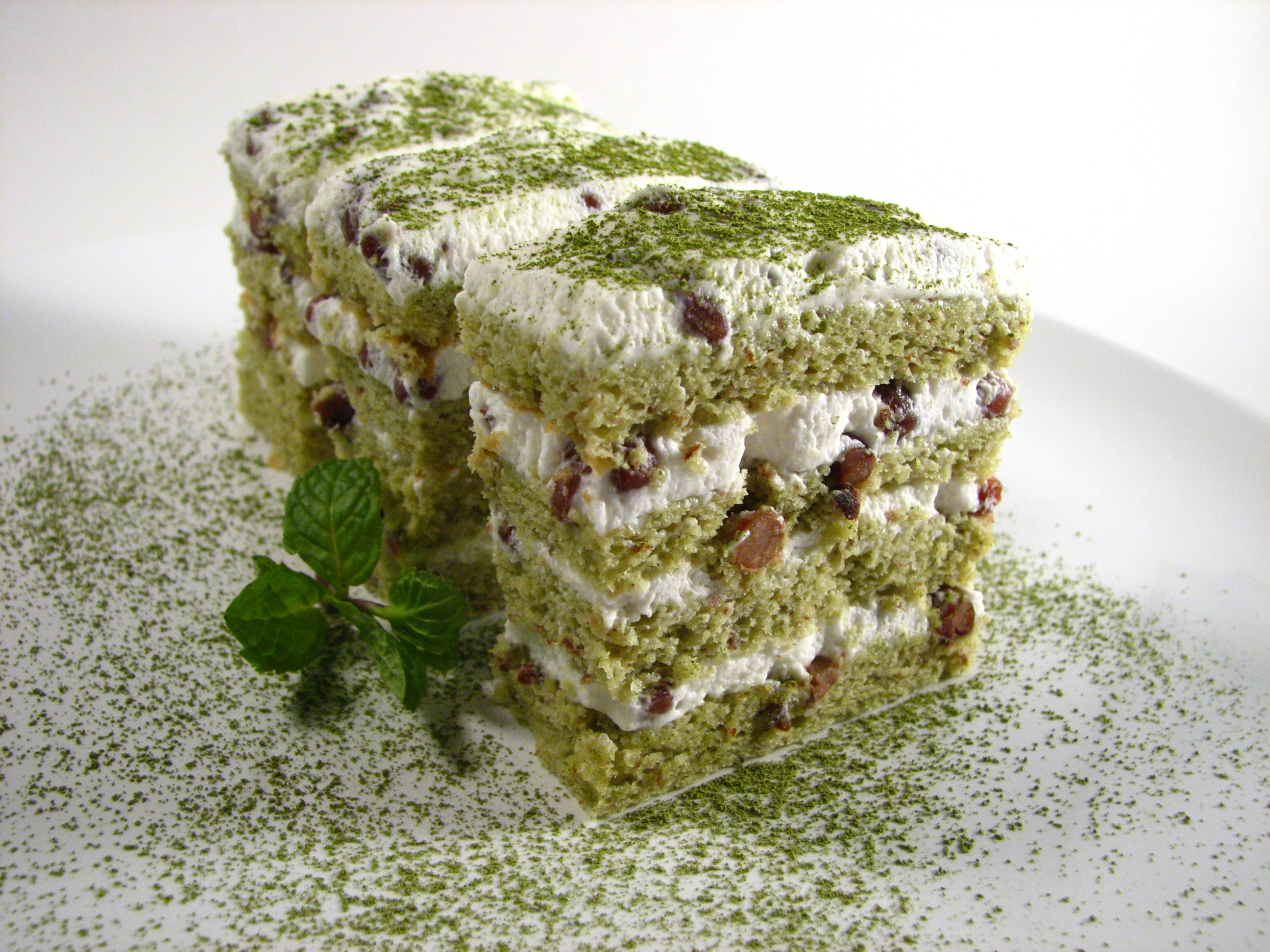
Matcha cake

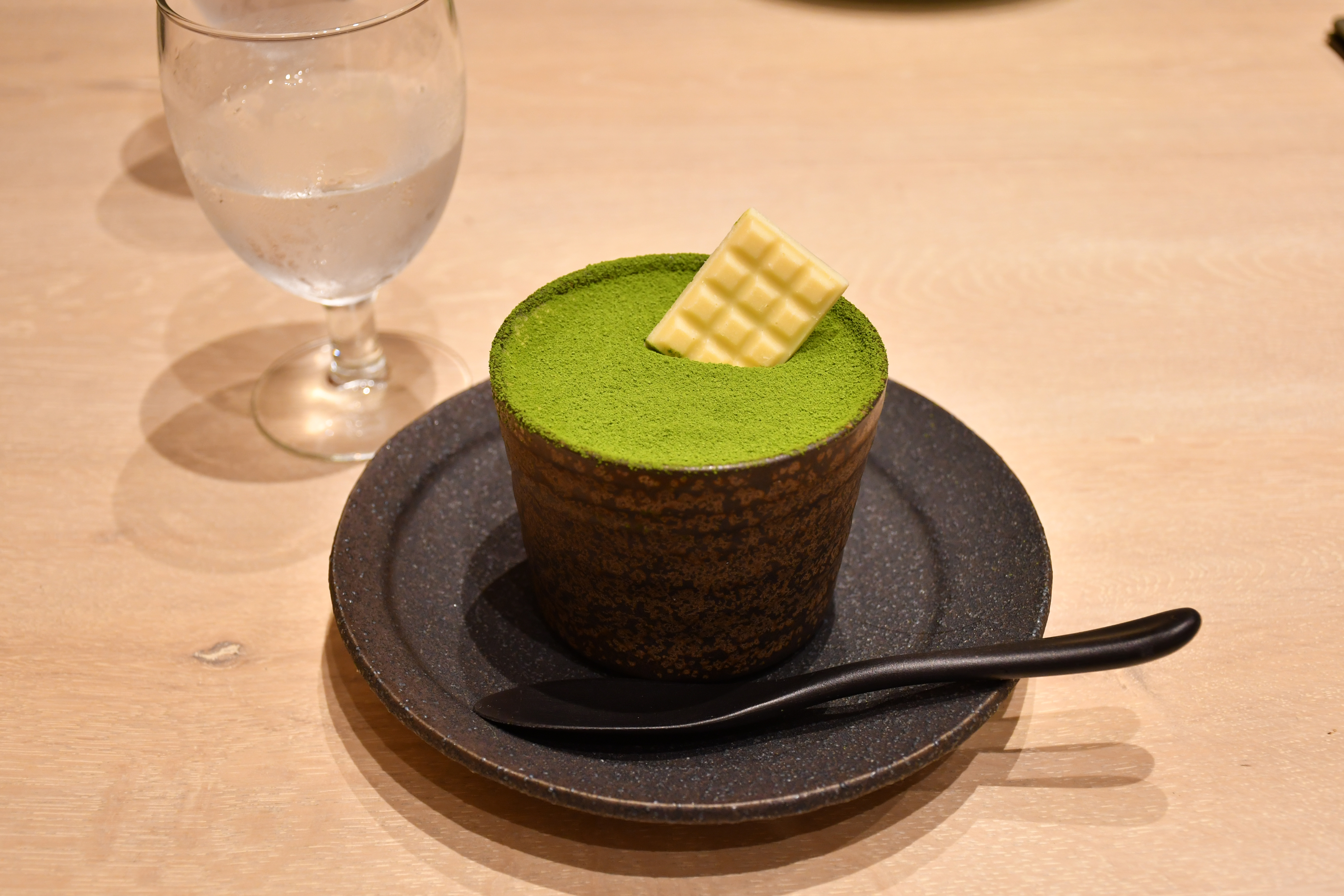
Matcha tiramisu

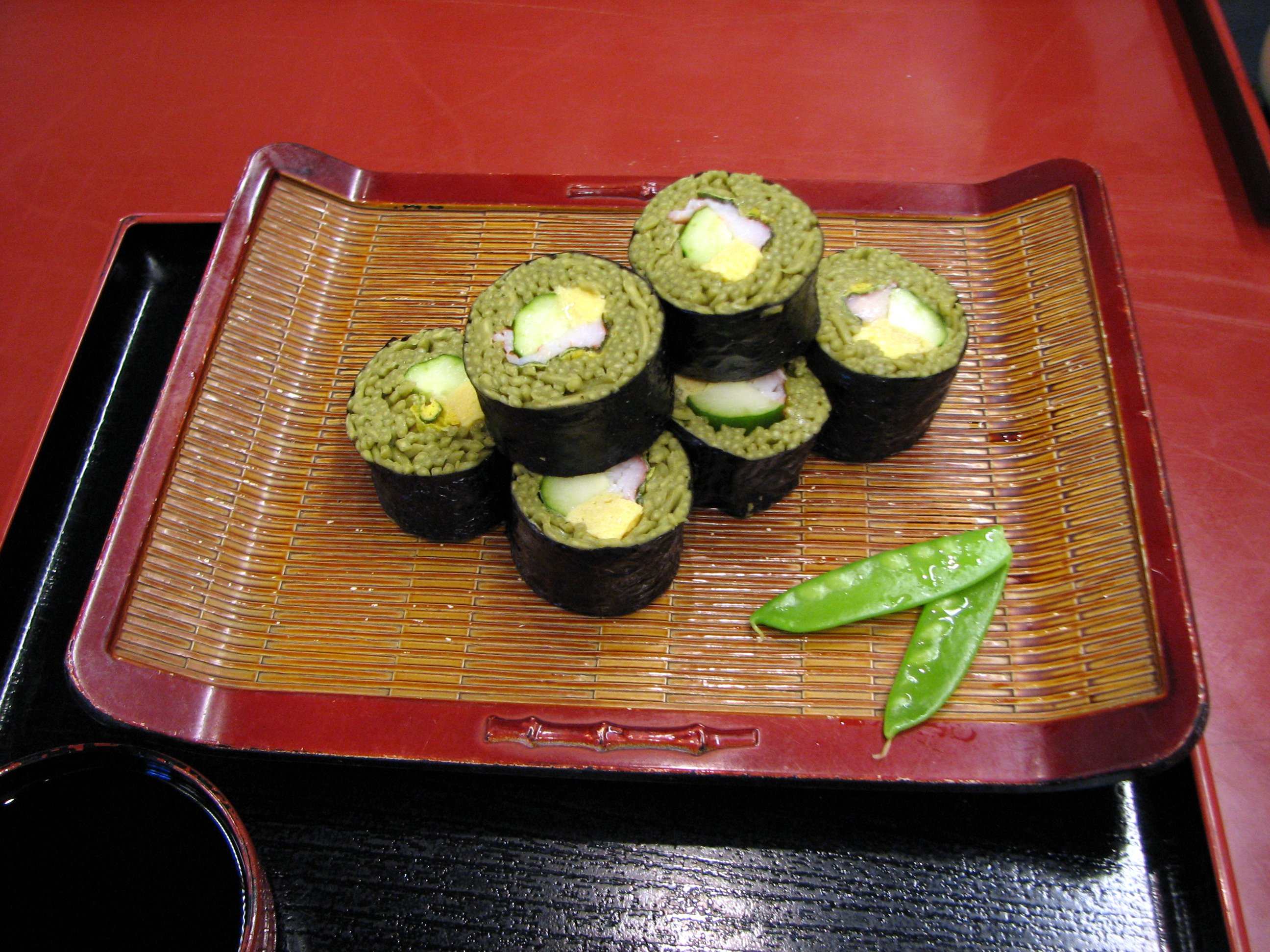
Cha-soba sushi roll

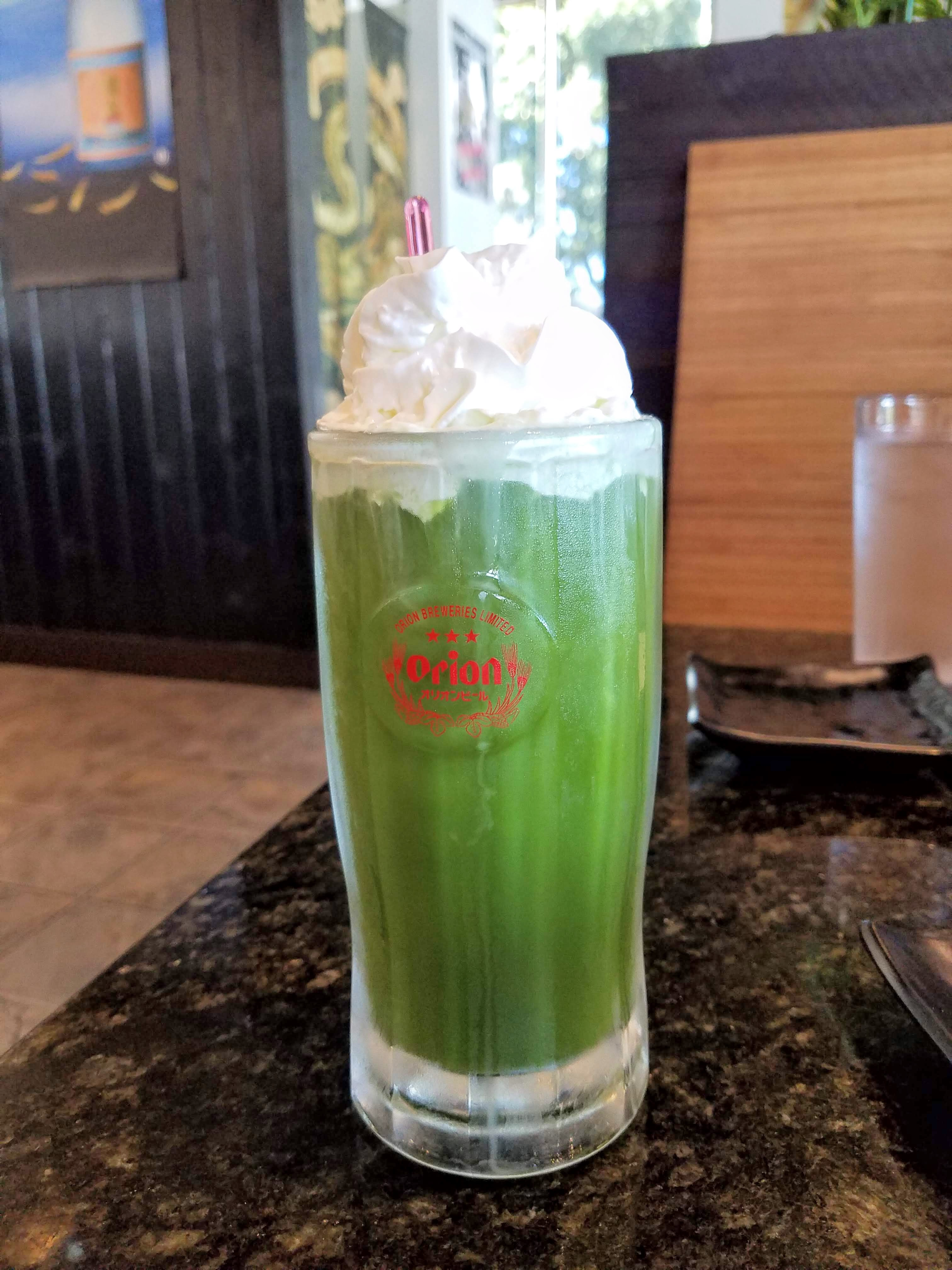
Matcha nitro cold brew topped with whipped cream

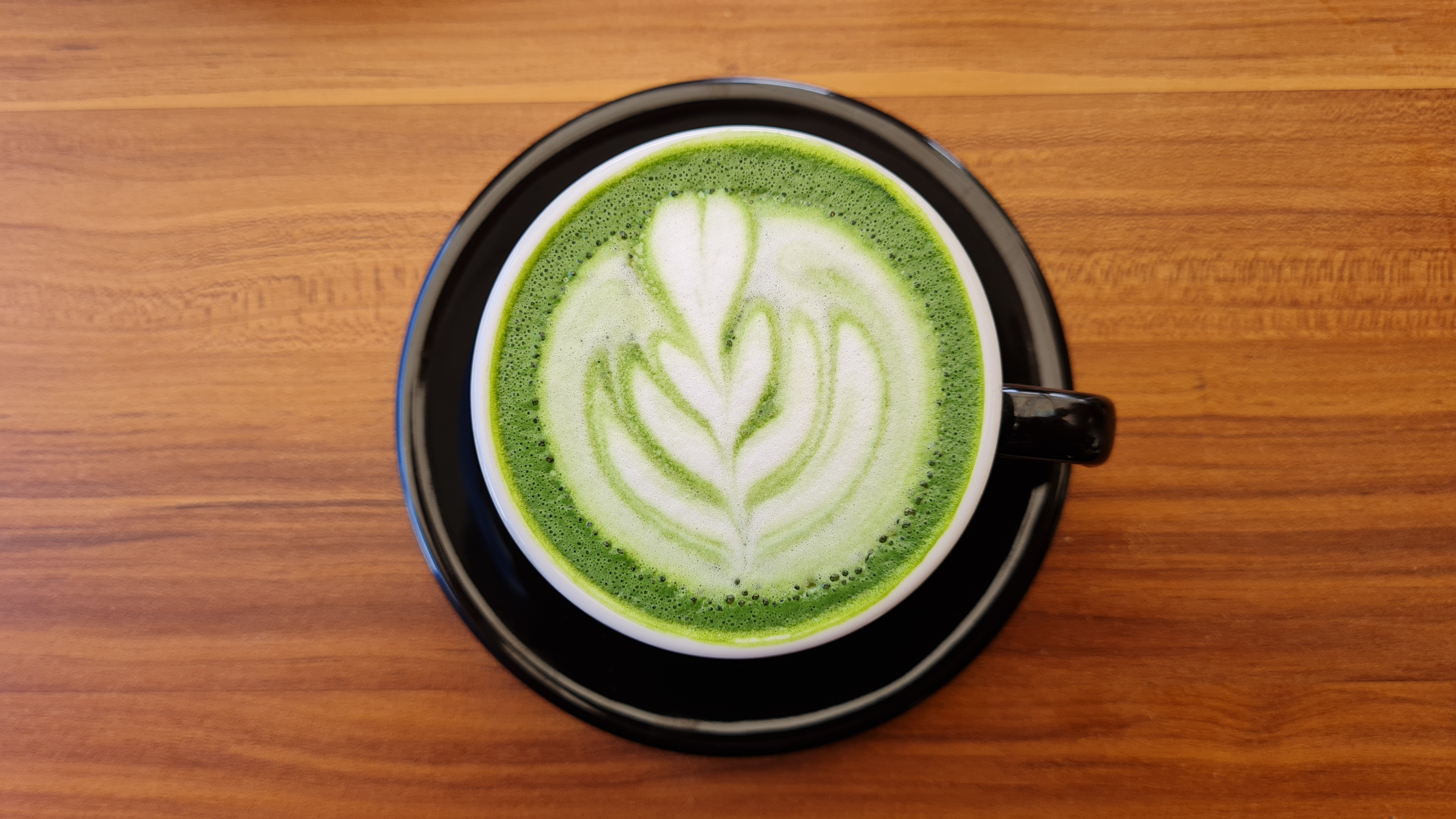
Matcha latte

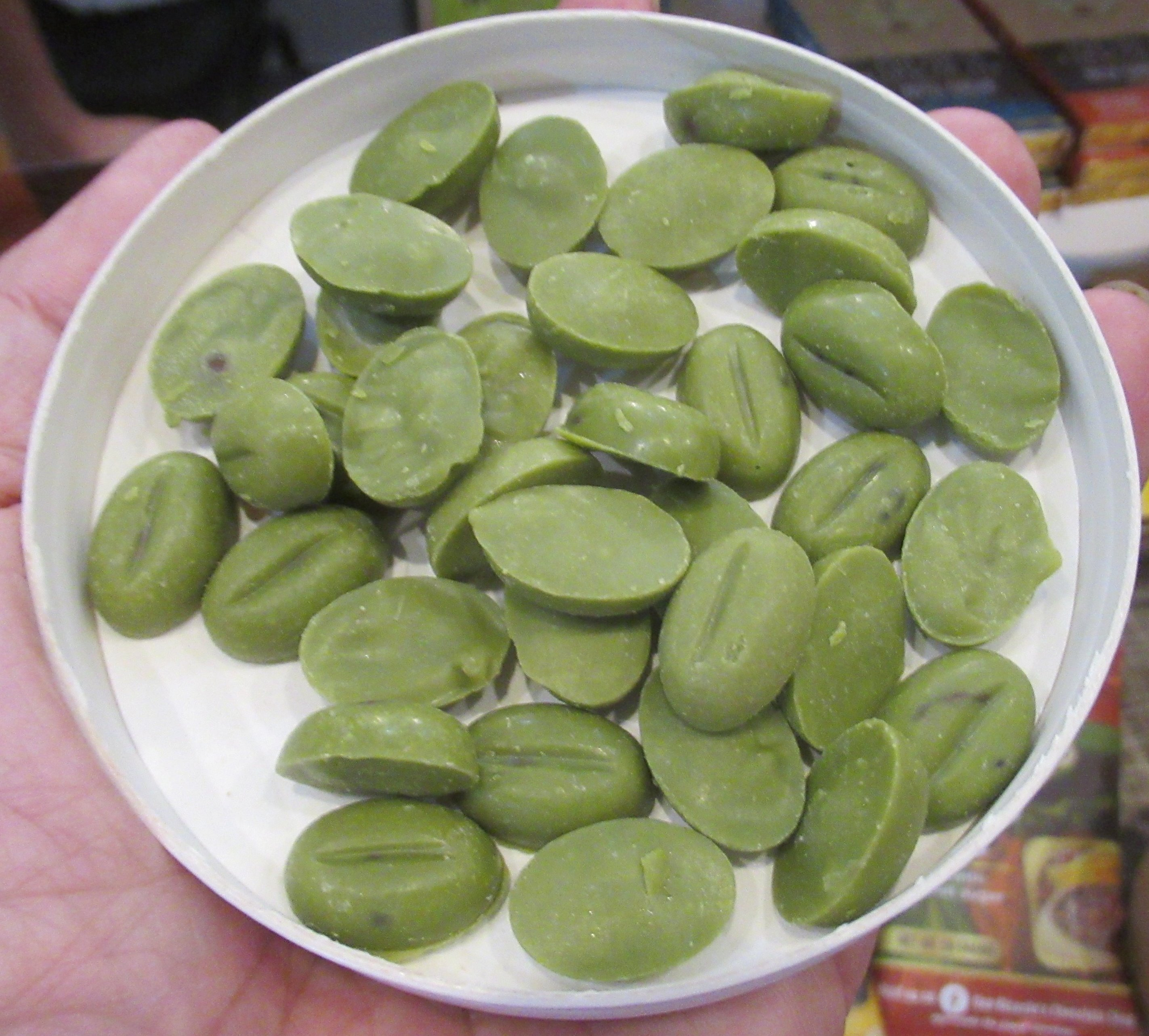
Coffee bean chocolate matcha in Maitum

== See also ==
- Coca flour, a similar ingredient made from powdered coca leaves
- Food powder
- Green tea
- Kinako, another powder common in Japanese cuisine made from soybeans
- Tea culture in Japan
