= Bissett (surname) =

Bissett is a surname that can be attributed to two or three origins. At the moment, it's somewhat more commonly Irish, descending from the Bissett family, who arrived in what is now County Antrim in Ulster in the mid-thirteenth century from Scotland. Many of the family remained in Scotland, but their descendants more commonly spelled their surname Bisset without doubling the final -t-, although this may have become much more common in the last two centuries. In any case, all share a common origin, and a considerable degree of movement between Ulster and Scotland has been witnessed throughout recorded history. A lineage might belong to one, then the other, and back again. A third possible origin for the surname in North America is as an "anglicization" of the French or French Canadian surname Bessette.

- Alan Bissett, Scottish author
- Bill Bissett (born 1939), Canadian poet
- Cora Bissett, Scottish actor, director and musician
- Cynthia Bissett (born 1954), American philanthropist
- Jacqueline Bisset (born 1944), American actress
- David Bissett (bobsleigh) (born 1979), Canadian bobsledder
- David Bissett (field hockey), Canadian field hockey player
- George Bissett (cricketer) (1905–1965), South African cricketer
- Jack Bissett (1900–1966), Australian footballer
- Josie Bissett (born 1970), American actress
- Phil Bissett (born 1956), American politician
- William Davidson Bissett (1893–1971), Scottish recipient of the Victoria Cross

== See also ==
- Clan Bissett
- Bisset
- Bessette
- Bessent
