= Bassetts =

Bassetts may refer to:

- Bassetts, California, an unincorporated community
- Bassetts Island, Bourne, Massachusetts
- Bassetts Ice Cream, an American ice cream company, oldest continuously operating ice cream company in the United States

== See also ==
- Bassett's, a former English confectionery company and brand
- Bassett (disambiguation)
