= Basset (disambiguation) =

A basset is a short-legged type of scenthound.

Basset may also refer to:

== Music ==
- Basset clarinet, a soprano member of the clarinet family with an extended range to written low C
- Basset horn (or basset-horn), an alto-tenor member of the clarinet family with an extended range to written low C
- Basset recorder, a historic term for a bass recorder
- Hohner Basset, a musical instrument, a keyboard bass from the 1960s

== Other uses ==
- Basset (surname), a list of people
- Basset (card game)
- Basset force, a hydrodynamics term
- Beagle Basset, British military communications aircraft
- The title character of Fred Basset, a UK-based comic strip

== See also ==
- Bassetlaw, the northernmost district of Nottinghamshire, England
- Bassett (disambiguation)
- Bissett (disambiguation)
