= Besant =

Besant may refer to:

- Besant (surname)
- Besant, Saskatchewan
- Besant Nagar, area of Chennai

== See also ==
- Bezant, coin
