= Bessent =

Bessent is a surname. Notable people with the surname include:

- Don Bessent (1931–1990), American baseball player
- Hattie Bessent (1908–2015), American psychiatric nurse
- Scott Bessent (born 1962), US Treasury Secretary, and hedge fund manager

== See also ==
- Besant (disambiguation)
- John Bessant (1892–1982), English cricketer
