= Bassett =

Bassett may refer to:

== People and fictional characters ==
- Bassett (surname)

== Places ==
=== United States ===
- Bassett, Arkansas, a town
- Bassett, California, an unincorporated community in Los Angeles County
- Bassett, Iowa, a city
- Bassett, Kansas, a city
- Bassett, Nebraska, a city
- Bassett, Virginia, a census-designated place
- Bassett, Wisconsin, an unincorporated community
- Bassett Hall, a home in Colonial Williamsburg, Virginia

=== United Kingdom ===
- Bassett, Southampton, a suburb and electoral of Southampton

== Other uses ==
- USS Bassett (APD-73), a United States high-speed transport in commission from 1945 to 1946 and from 1950 to 1957; also its predecessor USS Bassett (DE-672)
- Bassett Furniture, an American furniture manufacturer

== See also ==
- Bassett nicolo, a type of alto shawm (musical instrument)
- Bassett Green, a suburb of Southampton
- Bassett's, a former English confectionery company and brand
- Bassetts (disambiguation)
- Basset (disambiguation)
- Bissett (disambiguation)
