= Bassetts Ice Cream =

American ice cream company

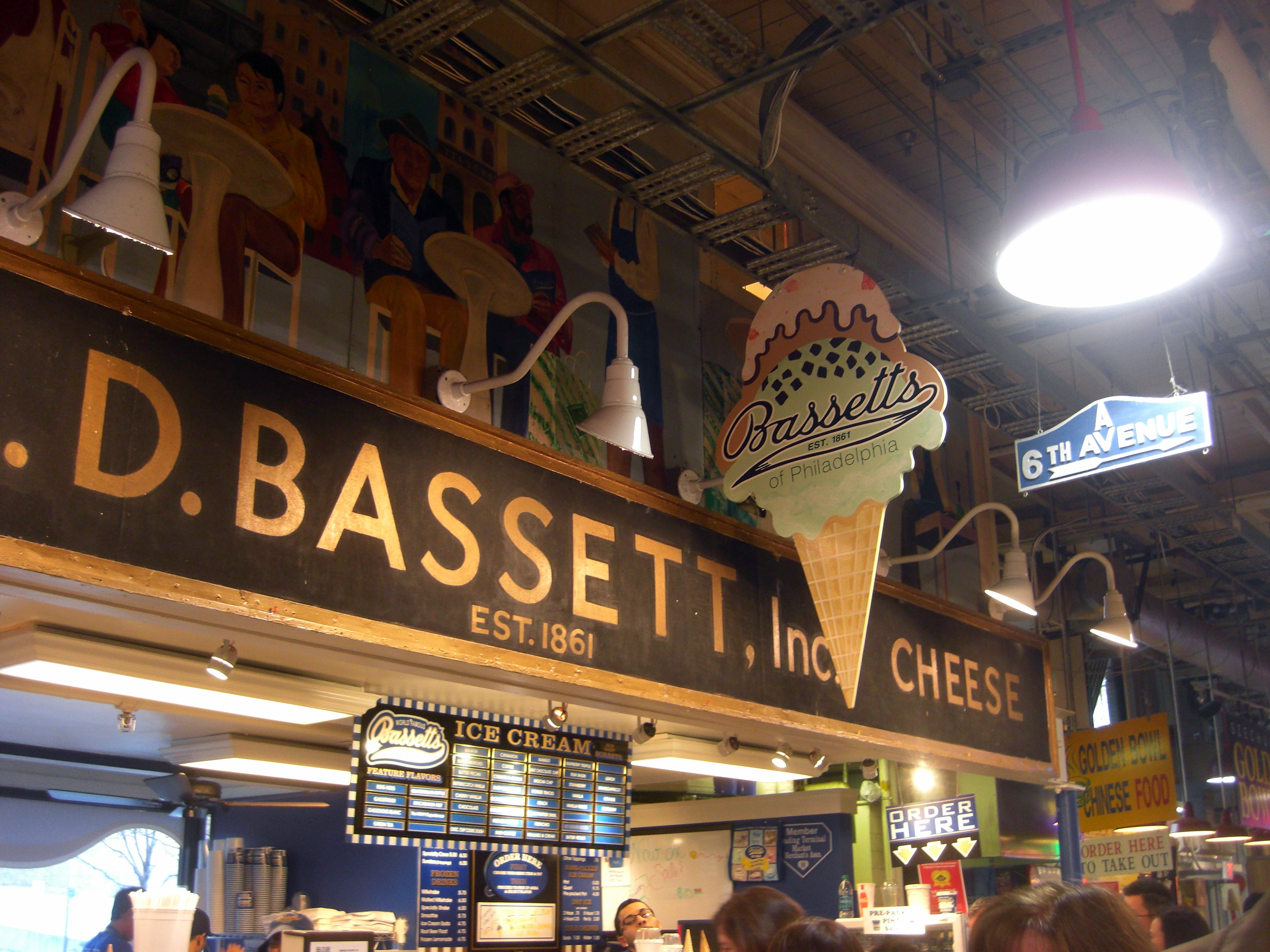
- Industry: Ice cream manufacturer and sales
- Founded: 1861; 165 years ago
- Founder: Lewis Dubois Bassett
- Headquarters: 45 North 12th Street, Philadelphia, Pennsylvania, U.S.
- Owner: Michael Bassett Strange
- Website: bassettsicecream.com

Bassetts Ice Cream is an American ice cream company founded in 1861 by Lewis Dubois Bassett in Salem, New Jersey, U.S.. Based at the Reading Terminal Market in Philadelphia, Pennsylvania, it is the oldest continuously operating ice cream company in the United States.

== History ==
Lewis Dubois Bassett, a Quaker school teacher and farmer, began Bassetts Ice Cream in 1861, employing a mule-driven churn at his Salem, New Jersey farm to create his dairy product. One of the company's earliest flavors was green tomato. Bassett took his ice cream to farmers' markets in Philadelphia, and due to popular demand, opened a shop at 5th and Market Streets in 1885. In 1892, the Reading Terminal Market opened, and Bassett set up shop there, where the business has remained ever since. It is the last remaining original merchant at the market.

Bassett died in 1906, and his son, Lewis Lafayette Bassett Jr., oversaw the business for the next 51 years. In 1959, Soviet premier Nikita Khrushchev visited the shop, and was given a borscht flavor to try.

In the modern era, Michael Bassett Strange runs the company, the fifth generation of the Bassett family to do so. The company sells to independent ice cream parlors, restaurants, country clubs, and retirement communities. Since 2008, Bassetts has sold in China where matcha and mango are flavors. In 2017, Bassetts started selling in Korea.

== Menu ==
Basssetts produces over 40 flavors, from vanilla to matcha green tea. Other flavors include chocolate pretzels and caramel swirl in vanilla bean ice cream, chocolate marshmallow, chocolate lace, and pomegranate blueberry chocolate chunk.
