= Record of Tea =

Historical treatise on tea

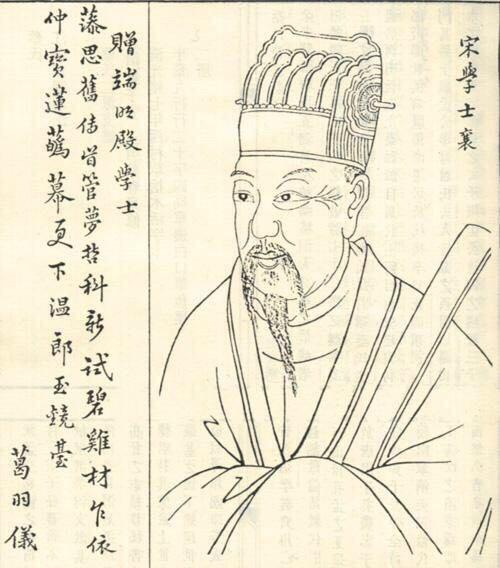
"The Record of Tea" was written by the scholar Cai Xiang in 1049–1053 CE

The Record of Tea (Chinese: 茶录; pinyin: Chá Lù), also known as the Tea Note, is a Chinese tea classic by Cai Xiang written in 1049–1053 CE.

Reputed as one of the greatest calligraphers of the Song dynasty, Cai Xiang was also a great tea connoisseur. During the Qingli (慶曆) era of the Renzong Emperor (1041–1048), Cai Xiang was the Officer of Transportation in Fujian. He pioneered the manufacture of a small "Dragon Tribute Tea Cake" (大小龙团 daxiao longtuan) of superlative quality.

He wrote the first tea treatise of the Song dynasty, The Record of Tea. In this book, he documents, explains in detail, comments and also criticizes the preparation and usage of tea and its vessels. He also made one of the first documented comments on Jian ware. The work consists of two volumes.

He was a native of Fujian; he was the first writer to report the tea spotting game of Jian'an (now Shuiji county in Fujian).

== Table of contents ==
- Part I: About Tea
  - Properties of Tea
  - On Storage
  - On Baking
  - On Pressing
  - On Sieving
  - On Boiling Water
  - On Preheating
  - On Tea Spotting
- Part II: Tea Utensils
  - Tea Warmer
  - Tea Canister
  - Tea Hammer
  - Tea Clamps
  - Tea Grinder
  - Tea Sieve
  - Tea Vessel
  - Tea Spoon
  - Tea Kettle

== See also ==
- Treatise on Tea by the Huizong Emperor, written in 1107 CE
- Pictorial of Tea Ware by Shenan, written in 1269 CE
