= Yagen =

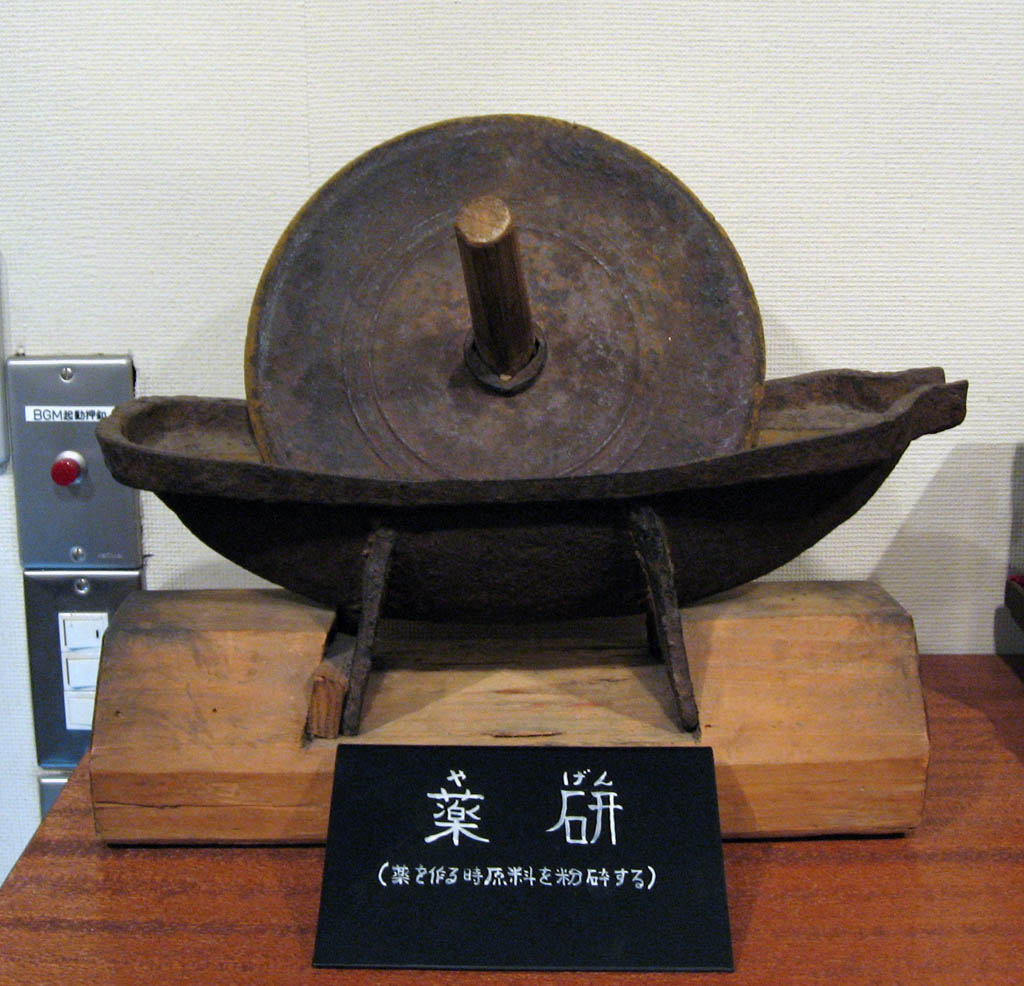
Yagen

Yagen (薬研) is a crushing tool used in grinding plant medicines in Asia. It consists of a disk and a boat-shaped mortar. The disk is rolled back and forth to crush ingredients.

It differs from the mortar and pestles used in Japanese cuisine, which are called suribachi (擂鉢) and surikogi (擂粉木).
