= Bisset =

Bisset is a surname of Scottish origin.

== History ==
Sir Thomas Gray in his Scalacronica states that William the Lion in 1174, on his return from captivity in Falaise and in England, brought back young Englishmen of family to seek their fortune in the Scottish Court; and among these were named the "Biseys". The first of the name recorded in Scotland is Henricus Byset, who witnessed a charter by William the Lion granted before 1198. His son, John Byset, who witnessed a charter by Henry de Graham in 1204, was the individual who obtained from the king the grant of lands in the north.

In 1242 the power of the Bissets was brought to a sudden end, though they still continued to be a family of importance. At a tournament held at Haddington in that year Walter Byset, lord of Aboyne, was worsted by the young earl of Atholl. In revenge Byset is stated to have burned the house in which the earl slept, and the earl with it. For this crime Walter Byset and his nephew, John Byset (founder of the Priory of Beauly in 1231), were exiled the kingdom, their property devolving to others of the family. At the desire of Sir William Byset and to free him of suspicion of guilt, Ralph, bishop of Aberdeen excommunicated those who had partaken of the murder of the earl at Haddington:

The bischope of Abbyrdeyn alssua He gert cursse denownsse al tha That gert be art, or part, or swyk, Gert bryn that tyme the Erl Patrik In al the kyrkis hallely In Abyrdenys dyocysi Schir Wiljam his processs Gert be don

— Wyntoun, bk. VII, c. IX.

Bissets still flourish in Aberdeenshire and Moray. The surname is a personal one, a diminutive of bis, OF. for "rock dove." Basok 1583, Beceit 1429, Besack 1677, Besate 1408, Besek 1584, Beset 1362, Biscet 1292, Biseth 1231, Bissait 1529, Bissaite 1468, Bissart 1542, Bissat 1579, Bissate 1543, Bissed 1640, Bissott 1674, Bizet 1686, Byssot 1489. A spelling of 1294, Buset, almost represents the present Gaelic pronunciation, Buiseid.

At the time of the British Census of 1881, its relative frequency was highest in Aberdeenshire (rate of 1:473), closely followed by Kincardineshire (rate of 1:474), Fife, Perthshire, Ross-shire, Linlithgowshire, Haddingtonshire, Forfarshire, Edinburghshire and Elginshire.

== Notable people ==
The name Bisset may refer to:

- Andrew Bisset (1953–2005), Australian author, music educator, and singer
- Baldred Bisset (c.1260–1311), Scottish lawyer
- Bill Bisset (1867–1958), South African rugby player
- Catriona Bisset (born 1994), Australian middle-distance runner, niece of Andrew
- Donald Bisset (1910–1995), British children's book writer, artist, stage director and actor
- George Bisset (footballer) (born 1943), Australian footballer
- Jacqueline Bisset (born 1944), English actress
- James Bisset (1836–1919), engineer, architect and politician of the Cape Colony
- Murray Bisset (1876–1931), South African cricketer and Governor of Southern Rhodesia
- Sonia Bisset (born 1971), Cuban javelin thrower
- James Gordon Partridge Bisset (1883–1967), British merchant seaman and a Commodore of the Cunard White Star Line

== See also ==
- Clan Bissett
- Bissett (disambiguation)
