= John Bessant =

English cricketer

Personal information
- Full name: John George William Thomas Bessant
- Born: 11 November 1892; Bedminster, Somerset
- Died: 17 January 1982 (aged 89); Frenchay, Bristol
- Batting: Right-handed
- Bowling: Right-arm fast-medium
- Role: Bowler

Domestic team information
- Years: Team
- 1921-1928: Gloucestershire

Career statistics
Competition	FC
Matches	113
Runs scored	1,200
Batting average	10.25
100s/50s	0/1
Top score	50
Balls bowled	8,414
Wickets	130
Bowling average	35.50
5 wickets in innings	5
10 wickets in match	0
Best bowling	5/29
Catches/stumpings	81/0
- Source: Cricinfo, 26 March 2014

John George William Thomas Bessant (11 November 1892 – 17 January 1982) was an English cricketer. He played for Gloucestershire between 1921 and 1928 as a hard-hitting lower-order batsman and a right-arm fast-medium bowler.

Bessant's obituary in Wisden Cricketers' Almanack states that although his career as a fast-medium bowler began promisingly in 1921 and he maintained a regular place in the Gloucestershire side for several seasons, he was often expensive in terms of runs conceded.
