= Besant, Saskatchewan =

Coordinates: 50.272°N 105.522°W

Location of Besant in Saskatchewan

Besant is an unincorporated community in Saskatchewan.
