= Bissett =

Bissett may refer to:

- Bissett, Manitoba, a community in Canada
- Bissett (surname), people with the surname Bissett
- Clan Bissett, a Scottish clan
- Bissett family (Ireland), a branch of the Scottish clan that settled in Ireland

== See also ==
- Bisset
