= Besant (surname) =

Besant is a surname. Notable people with the surname include:

- Annie Besant (1847–1933), British socialist, theosophist, women's rights activist, writer and orator
- Derek Michael Besant (born 1950), Canadian artist
- Walter Besant (1836–1901), English novelist and historian
- W. H. Besant (1828–1917), British mathematician

== See also ==
- James Anderson-Besant (born 1998), British organist and choir director
- Mabel Besant-Scott (1870–1952), British philosopher
