= Cai Xiang =

Chinese calligrapher, politician, engineer, and poet (1012–1067)

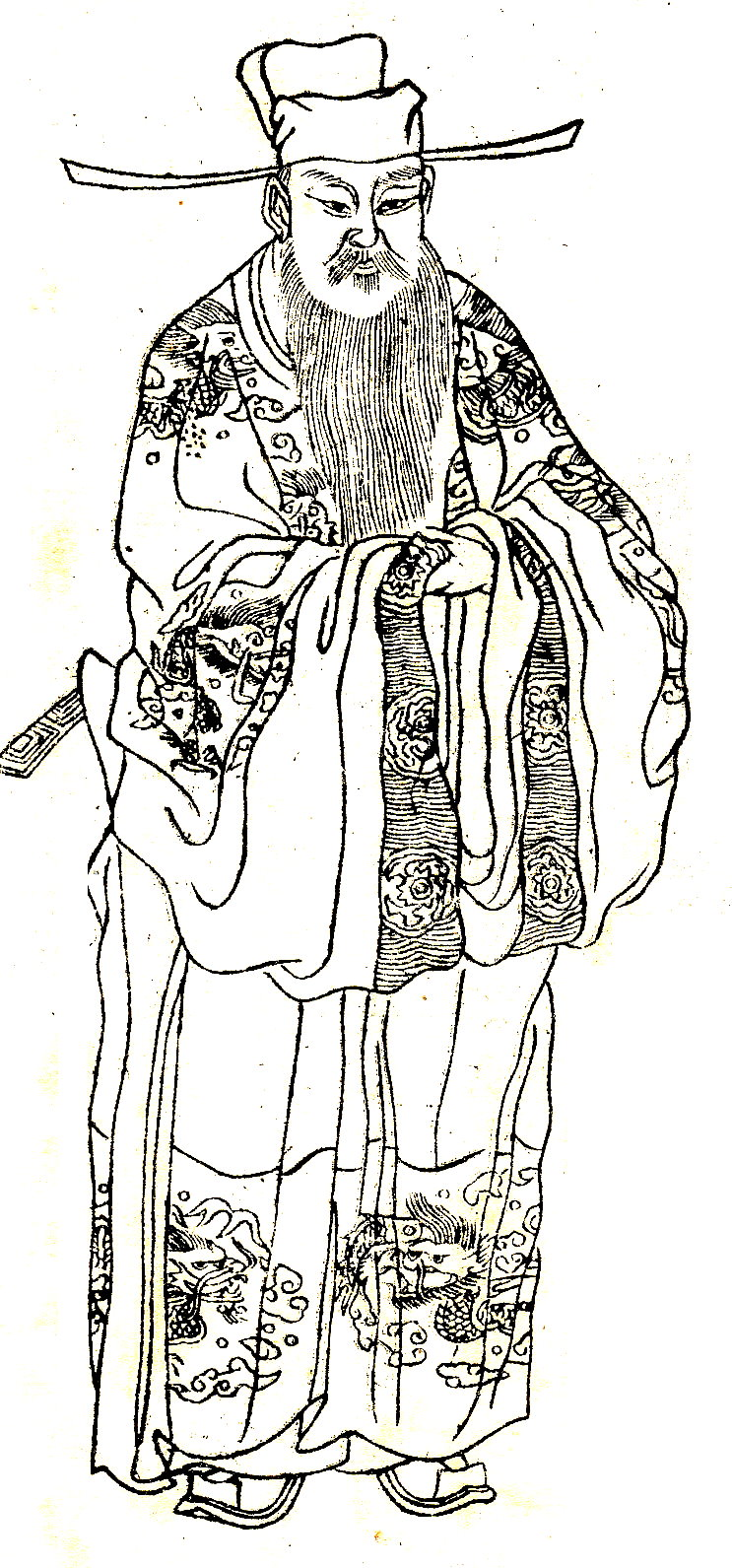
Image of Cai Xiang from the book "Wan hsiao tang-Chu chuang-Hua chuan（晩笑堂竹荘畫傳)", published in 1921

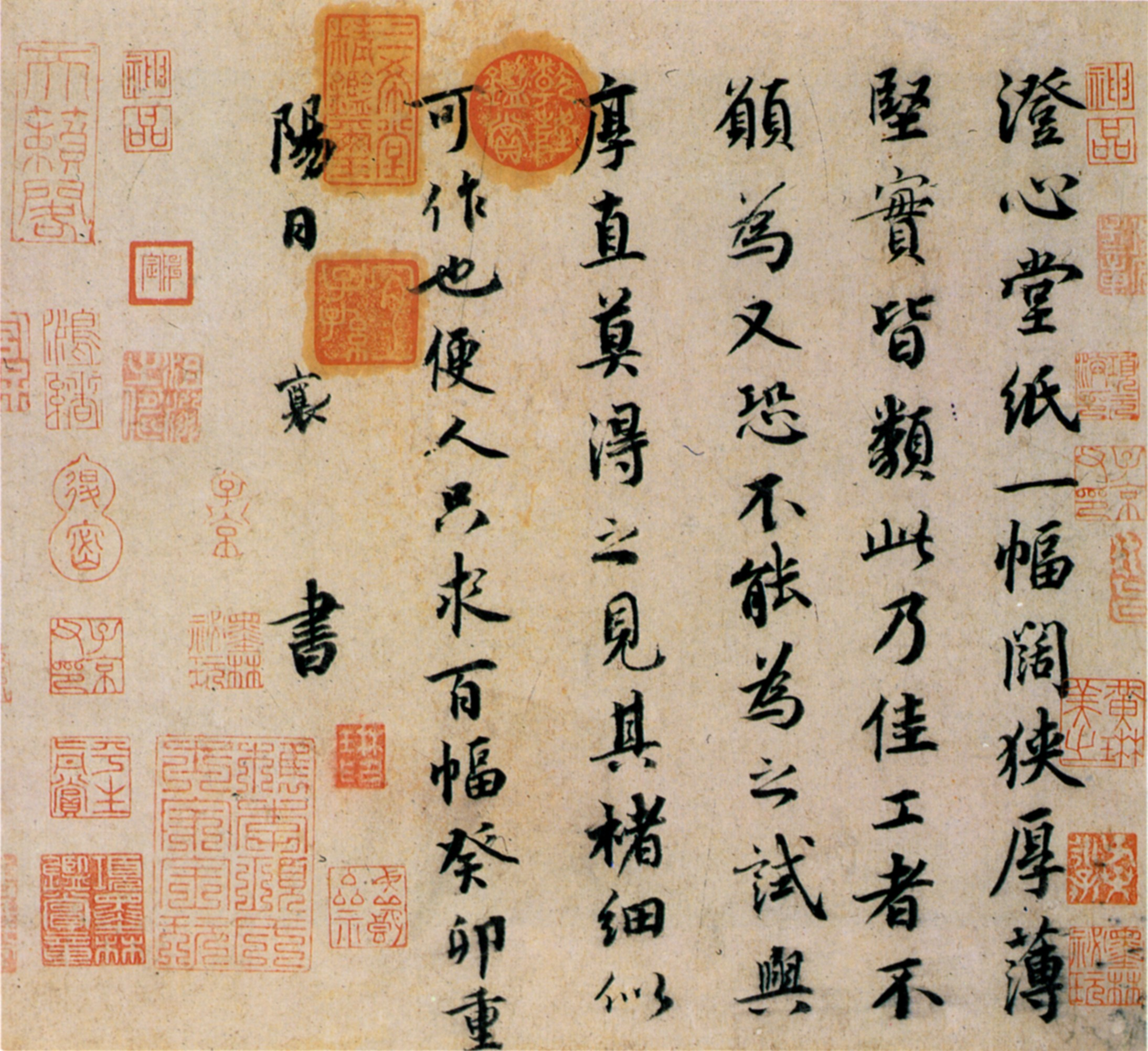
Letter on Cheng Xin Tang paper (求澄心堂紙尺牘) by Cai Xiang

Cai Xiang (Chinese: 蔡襄; pinyin: Cài Xiāng; Wade–Giles: Ts'ai Hsiang) (1012–1067) was a Chinese calligrapher, politician, structural engineer, and poet. Along with Su Shi, Huang Tingjian and Mi Fu, Cai Xiang is typically regarded as one of the Four Great Masters of the Song dynasty.

== Biography ==
He was born during the Dazhongxiangfu (大中祥符) era of the Song dynasty in Xianyou (仙游) county of Xinghua (興化) prefecture, now Xianyou County in Putian of Fujian province.

In the eight year of the Tiansheng (天聖) era (1030 CE) he obtained the degree of jinshi (進士, lit. "advanced scholar"), a graduate who passed the triennial court exam. His highest rank was Secretariat Drafter of the Duanming Court (Duanmingdian Xueshi), in charge of written communication of the imperial government. During the Qingli (慶曆) era (1041–1048 CE), he was the Officer of Transportation (Zhuanyunshi) in Fujian. While acting as a prefect in Fujian, he also was in charge of overseeing the construction of the Wan-an Bridge at Quanzhou.

He pioneered the manufacturing of small Dragon Tribute Tea Cake of superlative quality, as it was reputed to be harder to obtain than gold.

Cai Xiang's style name was Junmo (君謨), and his posthumous name was Zhonghuei (忠惠).

== Works ==
One of his most famous publications is his essay "The Record of Tea", also known as the "Tea Note", which he wrote in 1049–1053.

- Calligraphy: Wan'an Bridge Report Tablet
- Poetry: Collected Works of Cai Zhonghuei
- Letter: Letter on Cheng Xin Tang Paper

== See also ==
- Lu Yu (733–804), writer of "The Classic of Tea"
