= Bessette =

Bessette is a French Canadian surname. Notable people with the surname include:

- André Bessette, Holy Cross Brother and French-Canadian religious figure
- Carolyn Bessette-Kennedy, wife of John F. Kennedy Jr
- Gérard Bessette, Canadian author and educator
- Lauren Bessette, American investment banker, sister-in-law of John F. Kennedy Jr
- Lyne Bessette, Canadian bicycle racer from Quebec
- Matt Bessette, American mixed martial artist
