= Grand Treatise on Tea =

Book by Chinese Emperor Huizong

The Grand Treatise on Tea (simplified Chinese: 大观茶论; traditional Chinese: 大觀茶論; pinyin: Dàguān Chá Lùn) (Note: 大觀; Daguan was an era name of Emperor Huizong of Song.) is a book written by the Chinese Emperor Huizong of the Song dynasty in 1107.

Emperor Huizong was a great connoisseur of tea, with masterful skill in the art of tea ceremony. He often engaged in tea tasting and tea competitions with his subordinates at the Song imperial court. Emperor Huizong's favourite was Anji Bai Cha. (He wrote that what he loved was "Bai Cha." This should not be confused with the tea currently known as "White Tea," but was rather "a Green Tea which had the color of white jade".) In the Treatise on Tea, Emperor Huizong provided the most detailed, vivid and masterful description of the Song dynasty technique of tea spotting. The Emperor also laid down seven criteria for Tea Competitions (闘茶; Doucha).

The Treatise on Tea is a key document for understanding the most sophisticated tea ceremony in Chinese history. It stands as the monumental treatise on tea after Lu Yu's The Classic of Tea (c. 760–780).

== Contents ==
- Preface 茶論
- Locale 地產
- Season & Weather 天時
- Picking & Selection 采擇
- Steaming and Pressing 蒸壓
- Tea Making (Manufacture) 制造
- Appraising Tea 鑒辯
- White Tea 白茶
- Grinders and Sieves 羅碾
- Tea Bowls 盞
- Bamboo Whisk 筅
- Water Vase 瓶
- Ladle 構
- Water 水
- Dian; Preparing and Whisking the Tea 點
- Flavour 味
- Fragrance 香
- Colour 色
- Drying & Storage 藏焙
- Famous Teas 品名
- The Private Sector 外焙
