= Gaiwan =

Bowl for the infusion of tea leaves

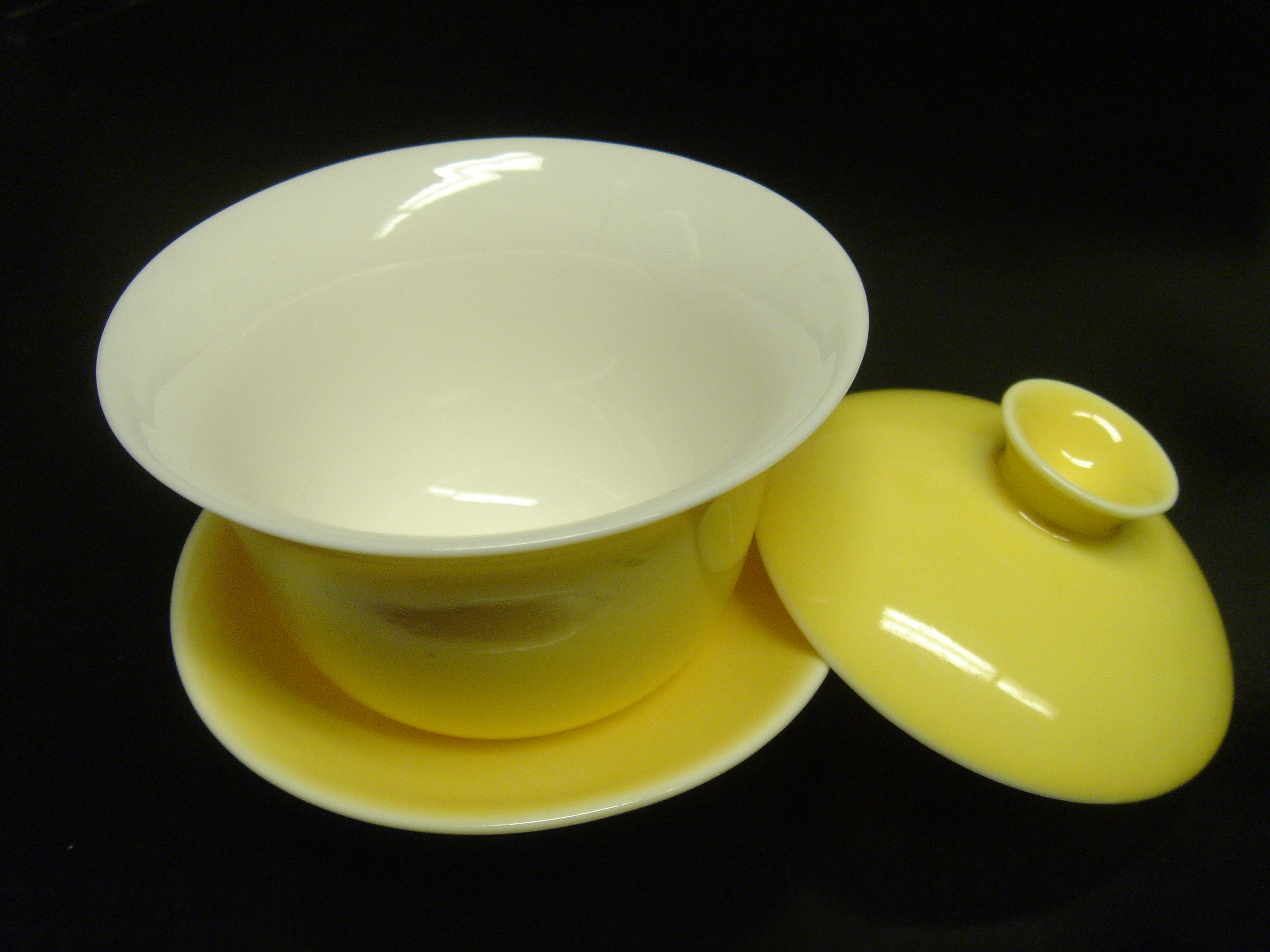
- Gaiwan, showing lid, cup, and saucer

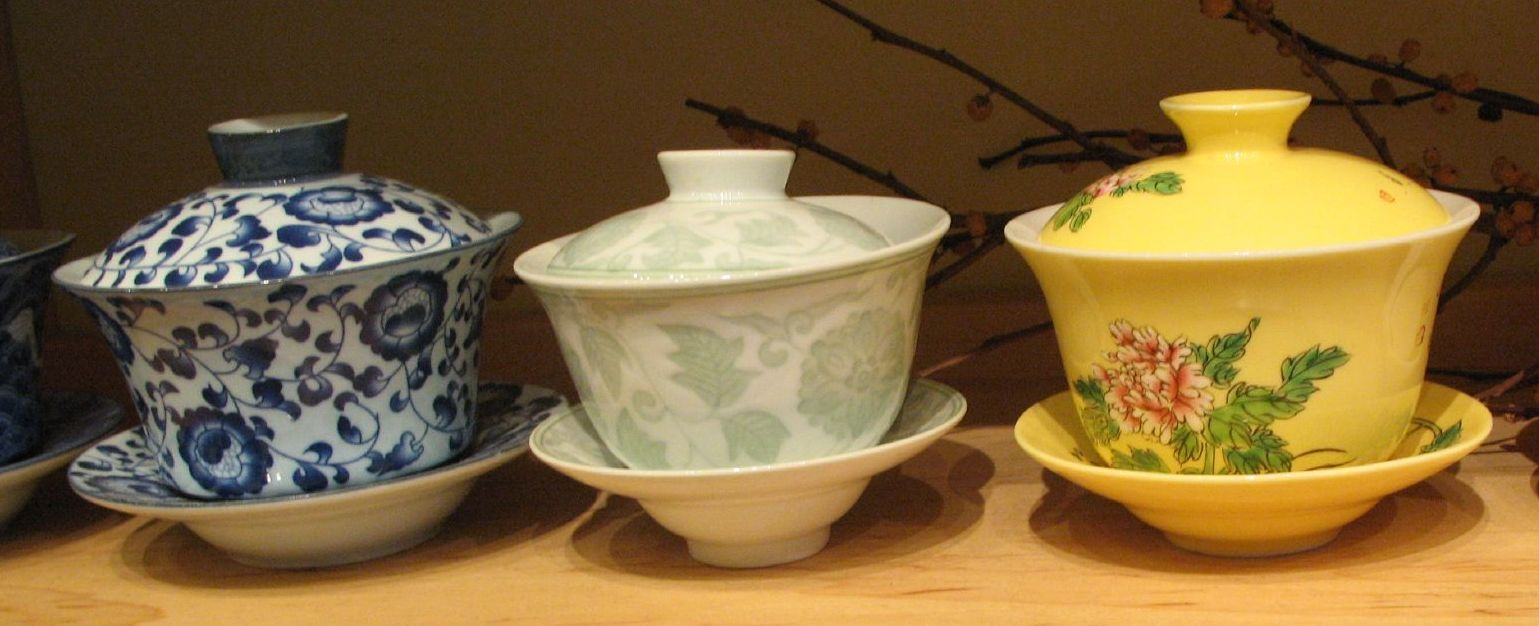
- Three gaiwans with various patterns
- Traditional Chinese: 蓋碗
- Simplified Chinese: 盖碗
- Literal meaning: lidded bowl
Transcriptions
Standard Mandarin
- Hanyu Pinyin: gàiwǎn
- IPA: [kâɪ.wàn]

Alternative Chinese name
- Traditional Chinese: 蓋杯
- Simplified Chinese: 盖杯
- Literal meaning: lidded cup
Transcriptions
Standard Mandarin
- Hanyu Pinyin: gàibēi
- IPA: [kâɪ.péɪ]

Second alternative Chinese name
- Chinese: 焗盅
- Literal meaning: hot-steeping vessel
Transcriptions
Standard Mandarin
- Hanyu Pinyin: júzhōng
- IPA: [tɕy̌.ʈʂʊ́ŋ]

A gaiwan (simplified Chinese: 盖碗; traditional Chinese: 蓋碗; /ˈɡaɪwɑːn/) or zhong (盅) is a Chinese lidded bowl without a handle, used for the infusion of tea leaves and the consumption of tea. It was invented during the Ming dynasty. It consists of a bowl, a lid, and a saucer.

== History ==
Prior to the Ming dynasty (1368–1644), tea was normally consumed from the vessel in which it was prepared. As described by the tea master Lu Yu, this special bowl had to be large enough to accommodate the implements and actions of tea brewing, though compact enough to be held comfortably in the hands for consumption. The term for this versatile piece of equipment was chawan (茶碗; lit. 'tea bowl'). It was during the Ming dynasty that the innovations in both tea ritual and tea preparation gave rise to the gaiwan.

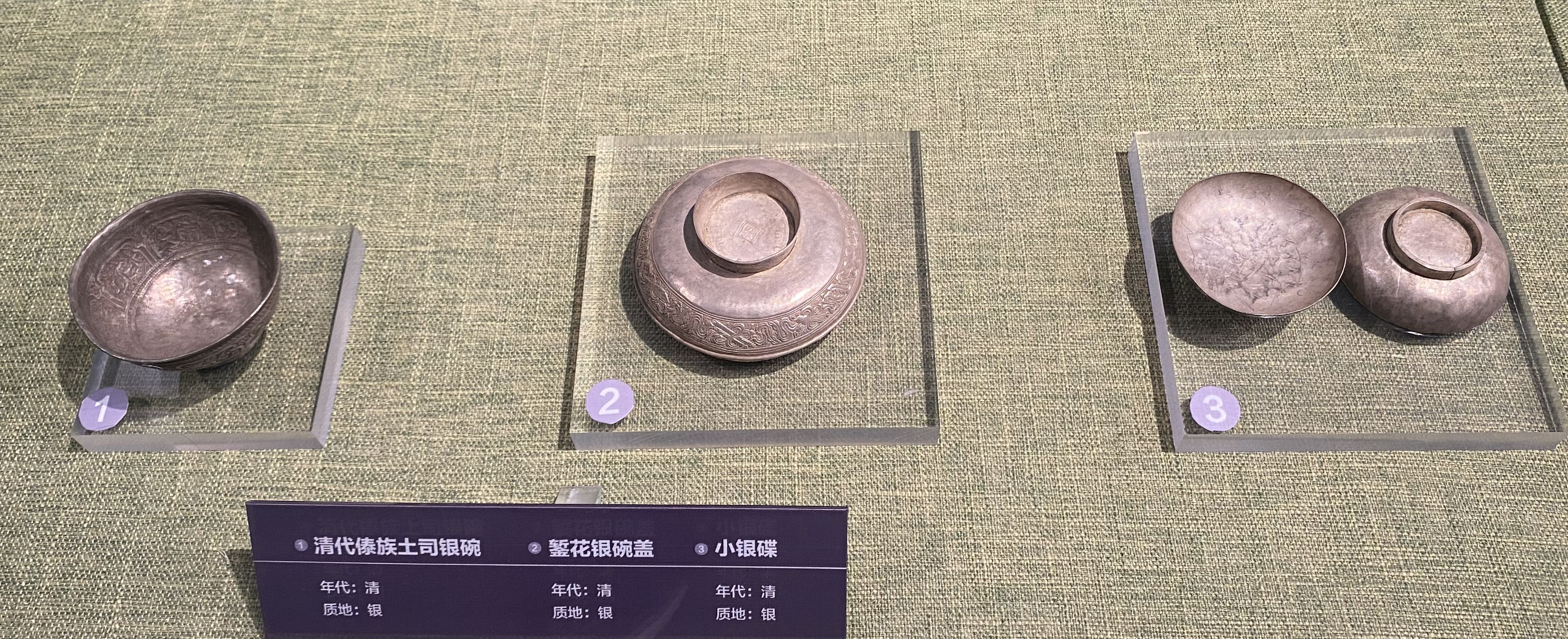
Qing dynasty metal gaiwans

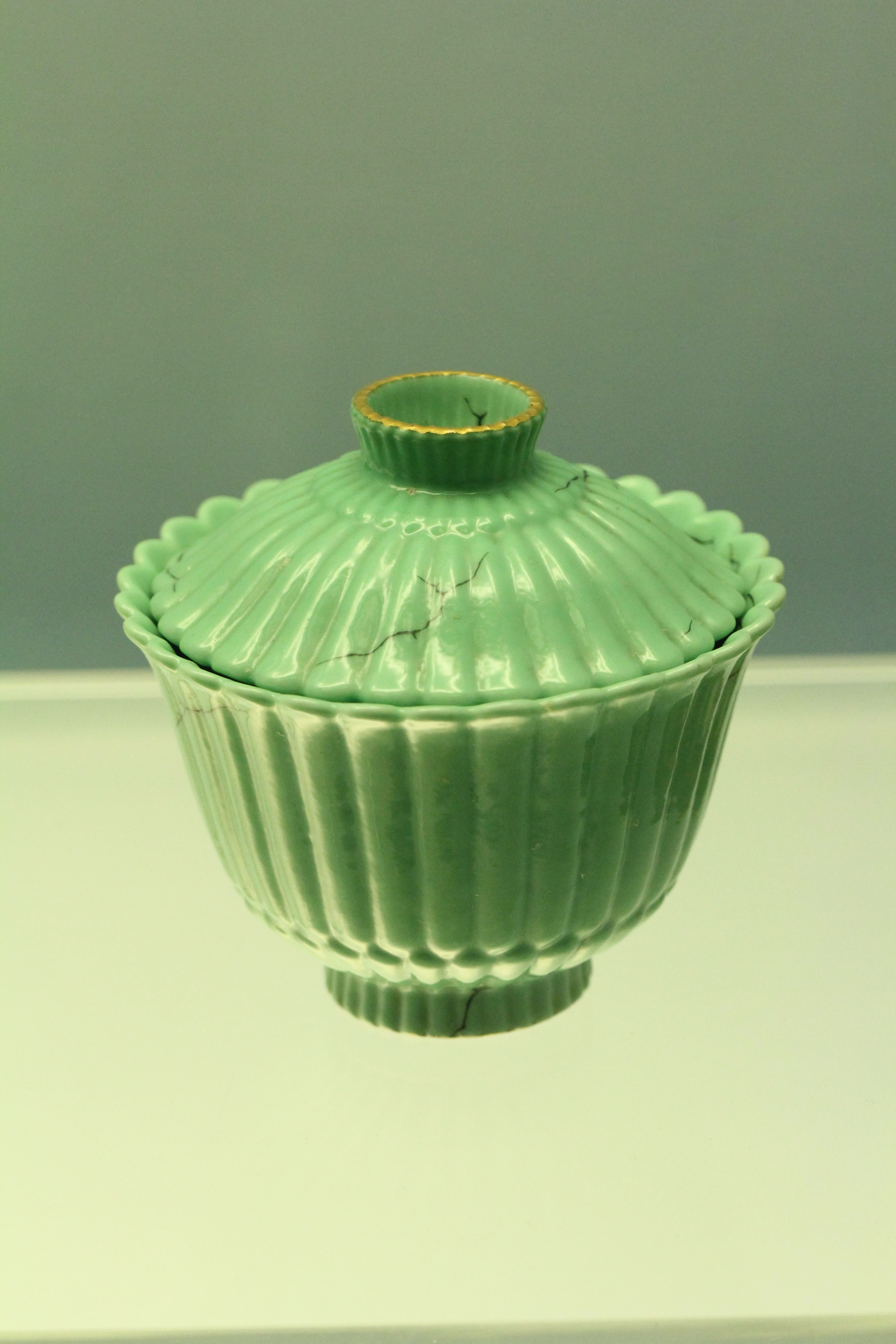
Jingdezhen porcelain, Qianlong Reign (1736–1795), Qing Dynasty.

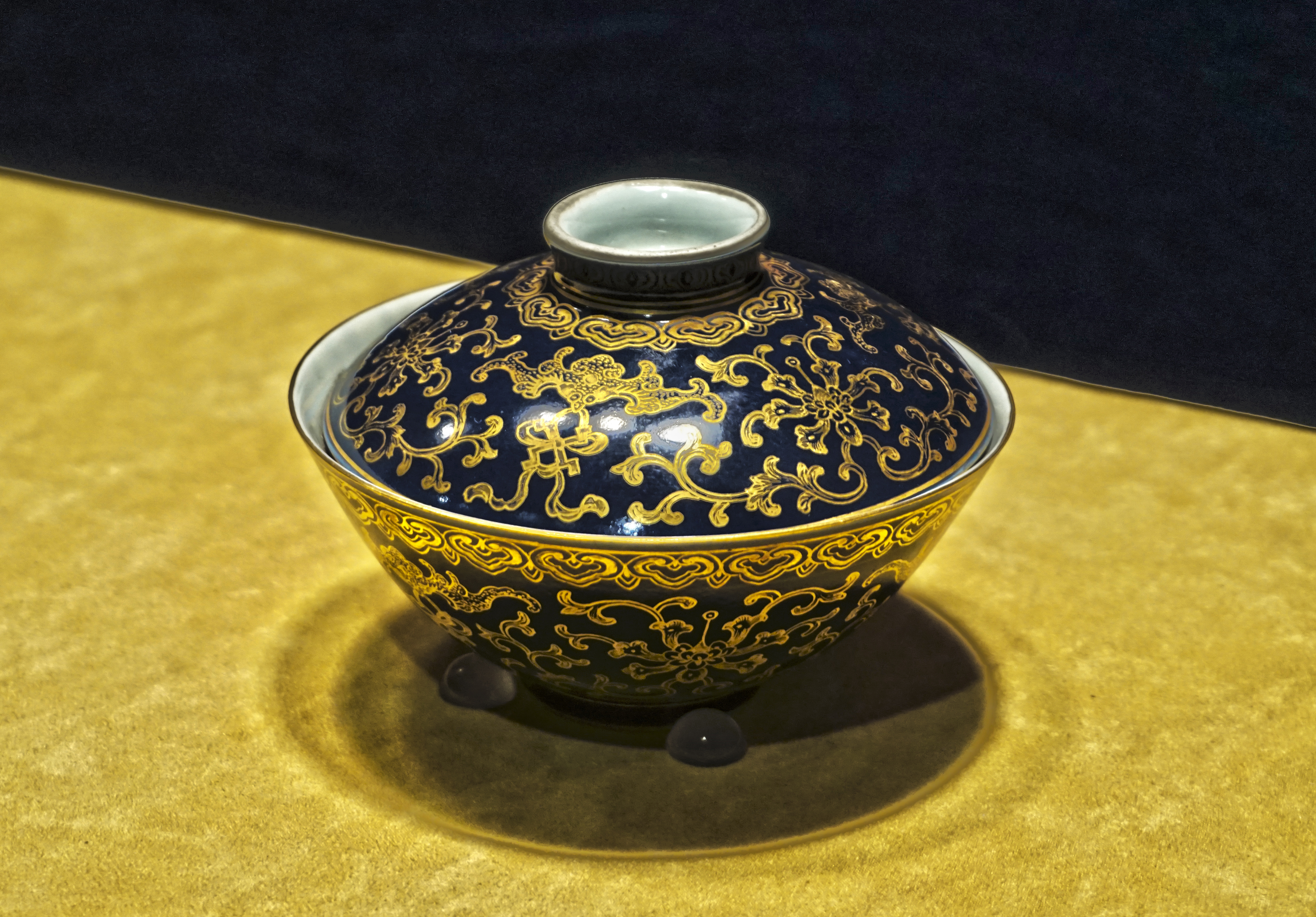
Gilded Qing dynasty porcelain, footed gaiwan.

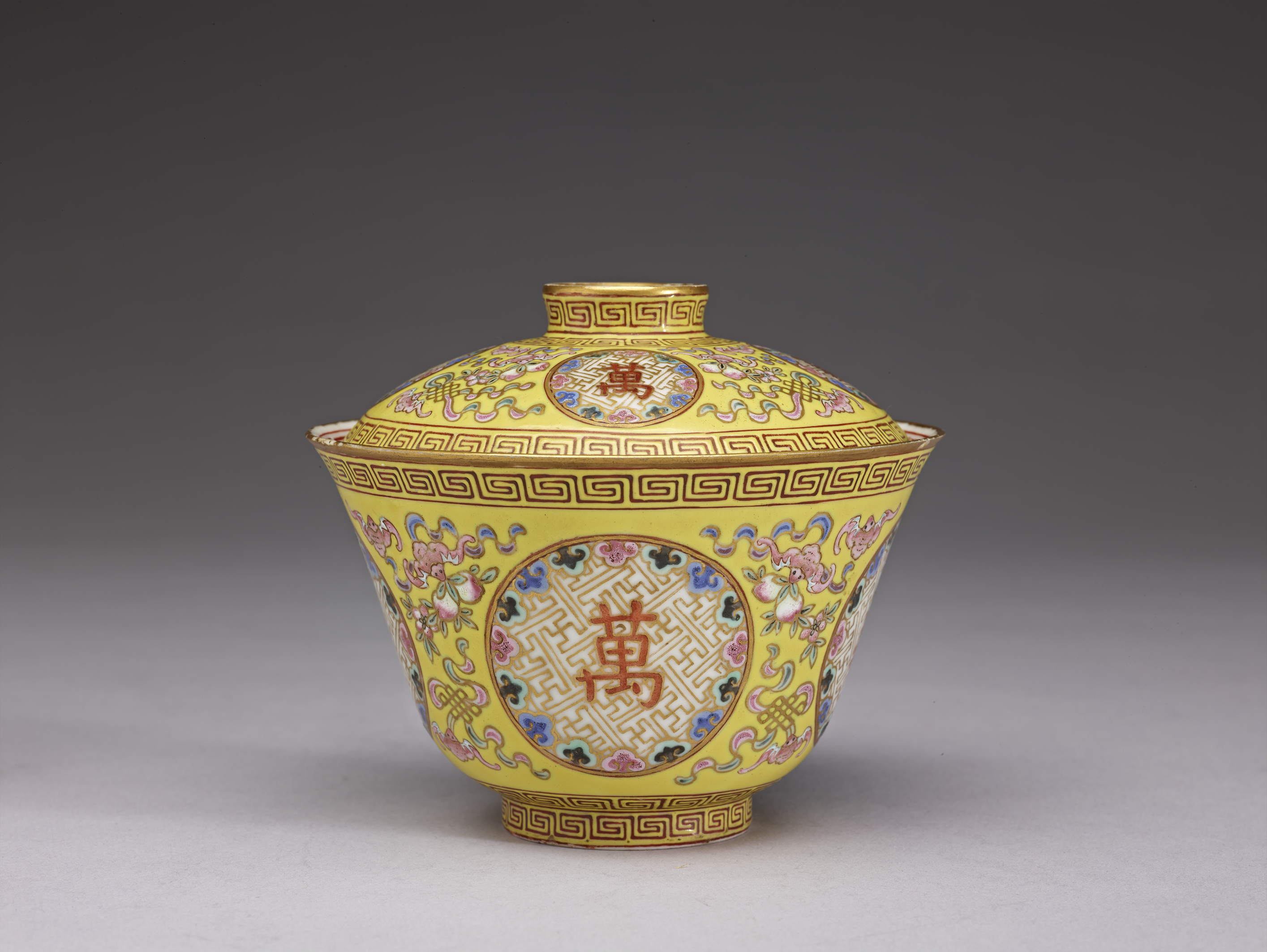
Gaiwan, Tongzhi porcelain (between 1862 and 1874, Qing dynasty)

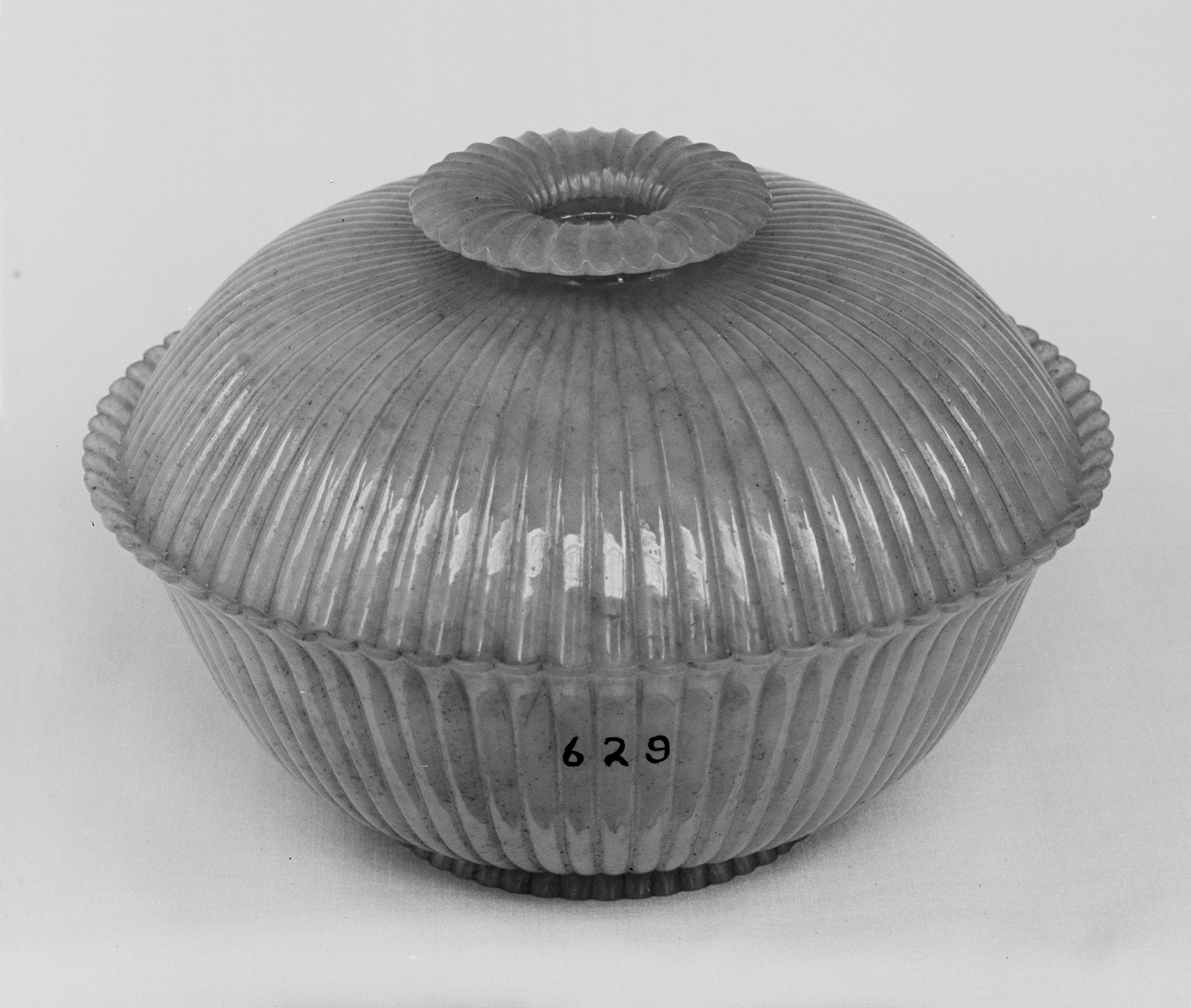
18th-century gaiwan carved from nephrite jade

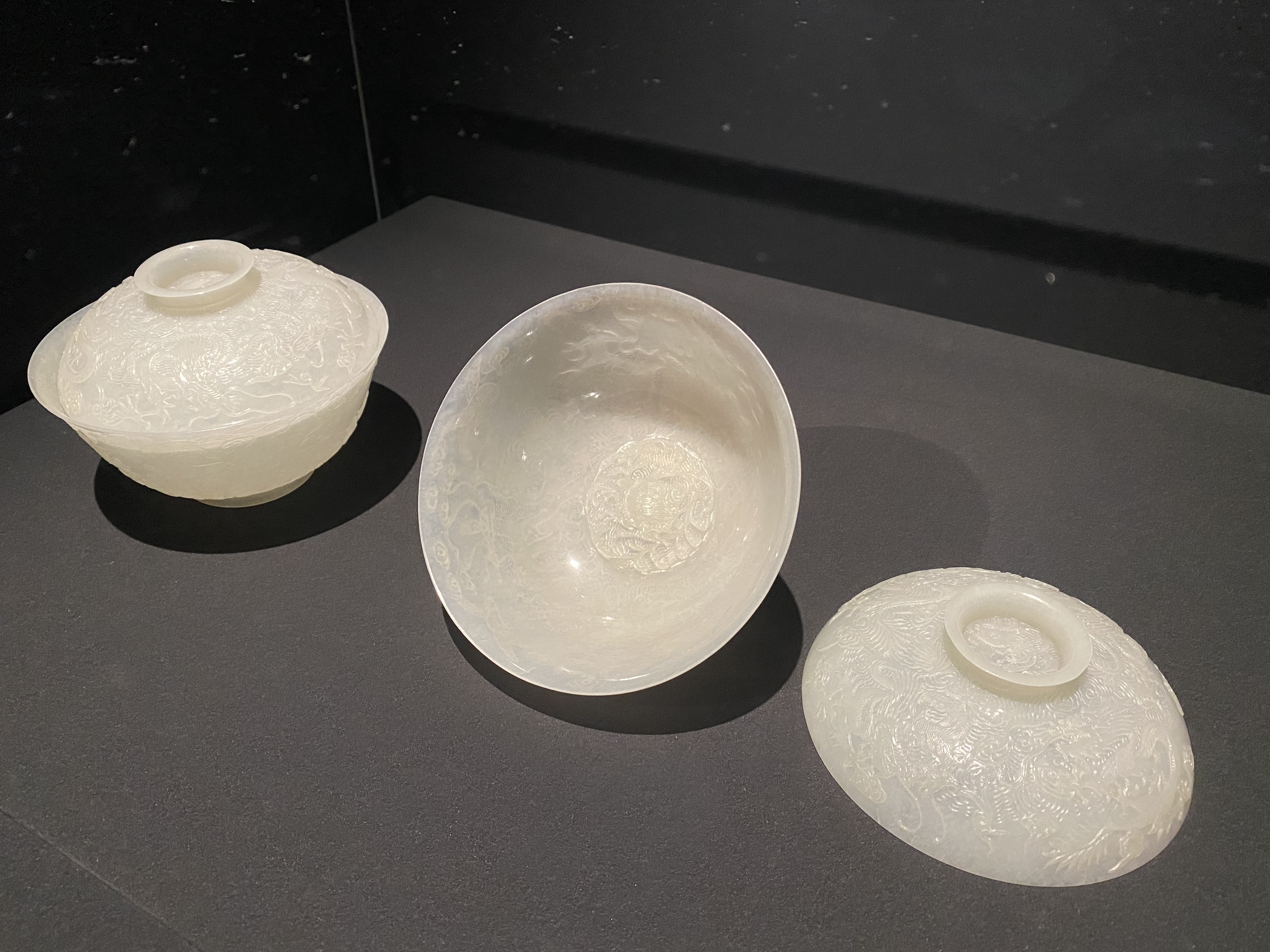
19th-century gaiwans carved from nephrite jade

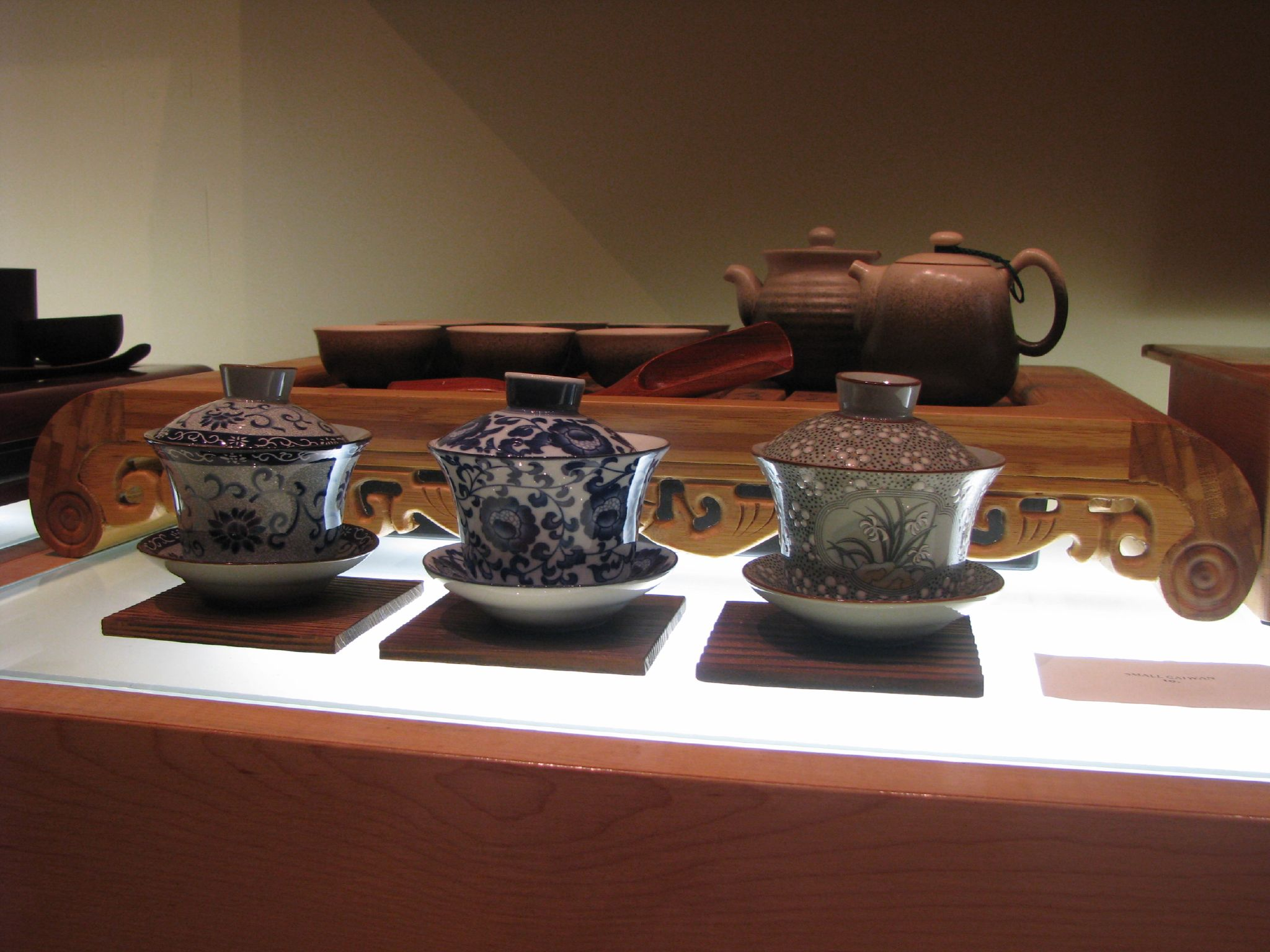
Three gaiwan in front of a tea tray bearing a tea set

== Design ==
Gaiwans are made up of three parts: a saucer, a bowl, and a lid. They can be made from a variety of materials, including porcelain and glass. Gaiwans are usually made from porcelain, but can also be made from less common materials such as Yixing clay or jade. Gaiwans are typically small, with a volume of around 100–150 ml, with some being as low as 80 ml.

A recently excavated Ming princely burial has yielded the first example to survive until modern times of a type of gaiwan set known from 15th-century paintings. There is a blue and white Jingdezhen porcelain stem cup, that has a silver stand and a gold cover (this dated 1437), all decorated with dragons. Presumably many such sets existed, but recycling the precious metal elements was too tempting at some point, leaving only the porcelain cups.

== Functions ==
The gaiwan is considered to be particularly good for brewing teas with delicate flavors and aromas, such as green tea and white tea. The versatility of the gaiwan is also noted in the preparation of oolong infusions because of this particular tea's ability to be infused multiple times, but the gaiwan is suitable for any type of tea. The gaiwan is important in tea tasting due to its open and glazed surfaces: the former allows the tea to be viewed while brewing, and the latter prevents altering of the flavour and aroma of the tea during brewing. The lid of the gaiwan allows the tea to be infused right in the bowl and either be drunk right from the bowl (traditionally using the lid to block the leaves for ease of consumption), or decanted into another container.

Gaiwan is the preferred method for brewing green and white teas as the gaiwan's porcelain absorbs the heat and does not damage the tea. Gaiwans are less suitable for black teas as the large lid allows heat to escape too quickly during the steeping process. They are especially common in the north of China for enjoying scented teas like jasmine tea.

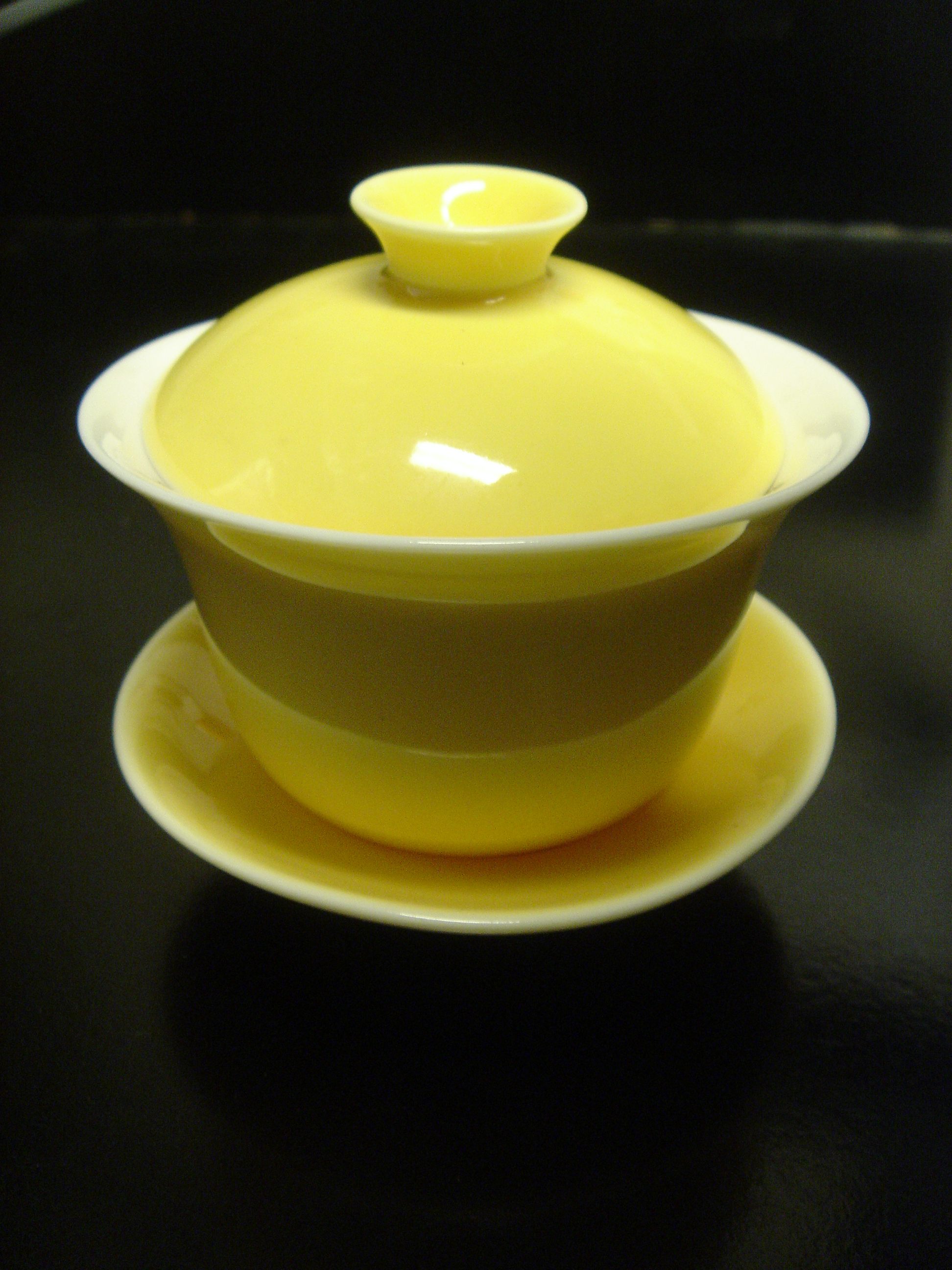
A porcelain gaiwan

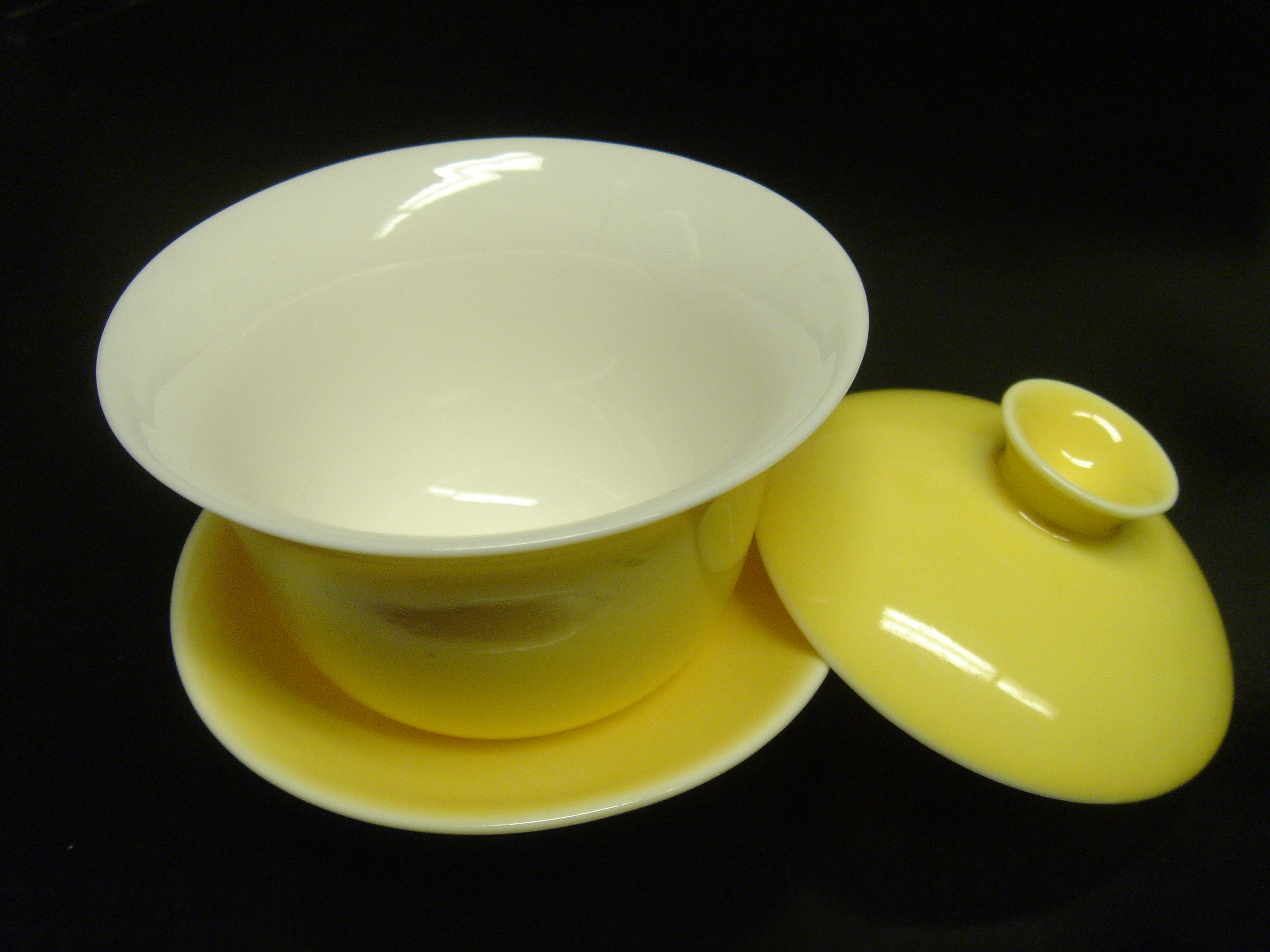
The same, lid removed

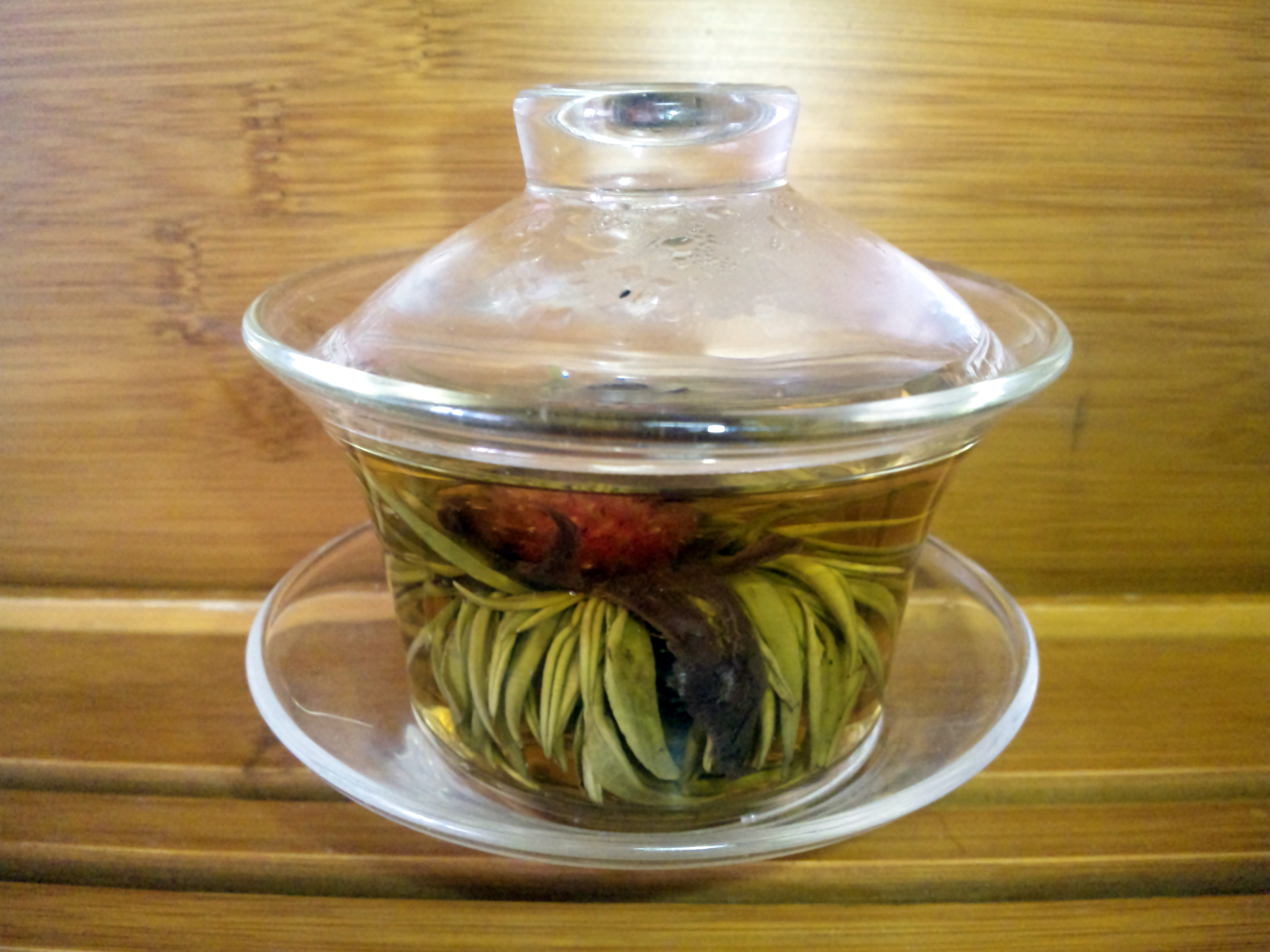
Glass gaiwan, with flowering tea, steeping lidded

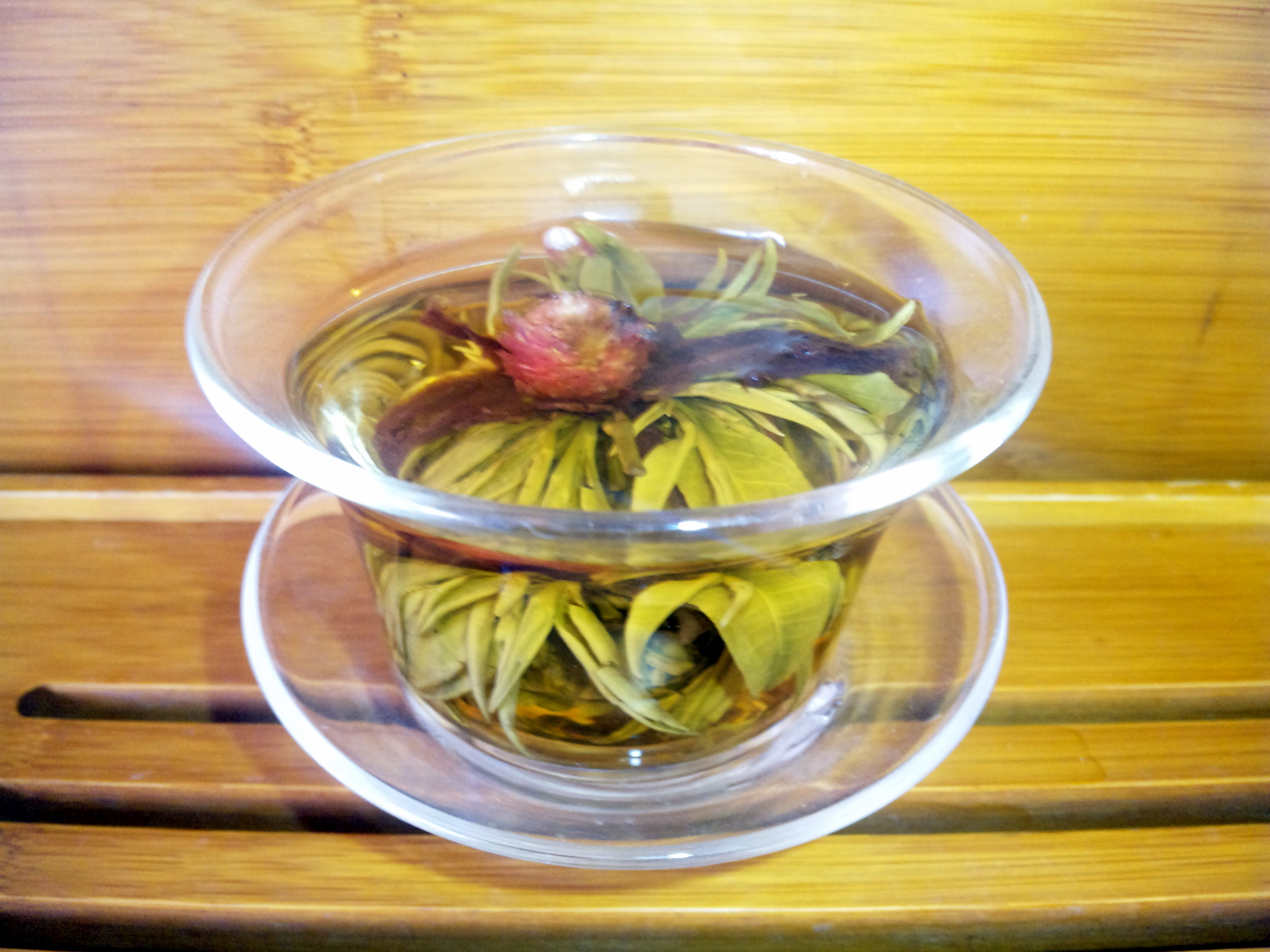
The same, unlidded

== Use ==
Usually all three parts are held at once with both hands. The saucer is held with the fingers of the right hand while the thumb rests on the edge of the bowl. The left hand then holds the lid, which is used to brush away the tea leaves before drinking. It can take some practice to do this, as the liquid is hot.

== See also ==
- Chinese tea
- Chawan
