= Chinese tea =

Traditional tea processing techniques and associated social practices in China
- UNESCO Intangible Cultural Heritage
- Country: China
- Reference: 1884

Inscription history
- Inscription: 2010 (17th session)
- List: Representative
- UNESCO Cultural Heritage

Chinese tea
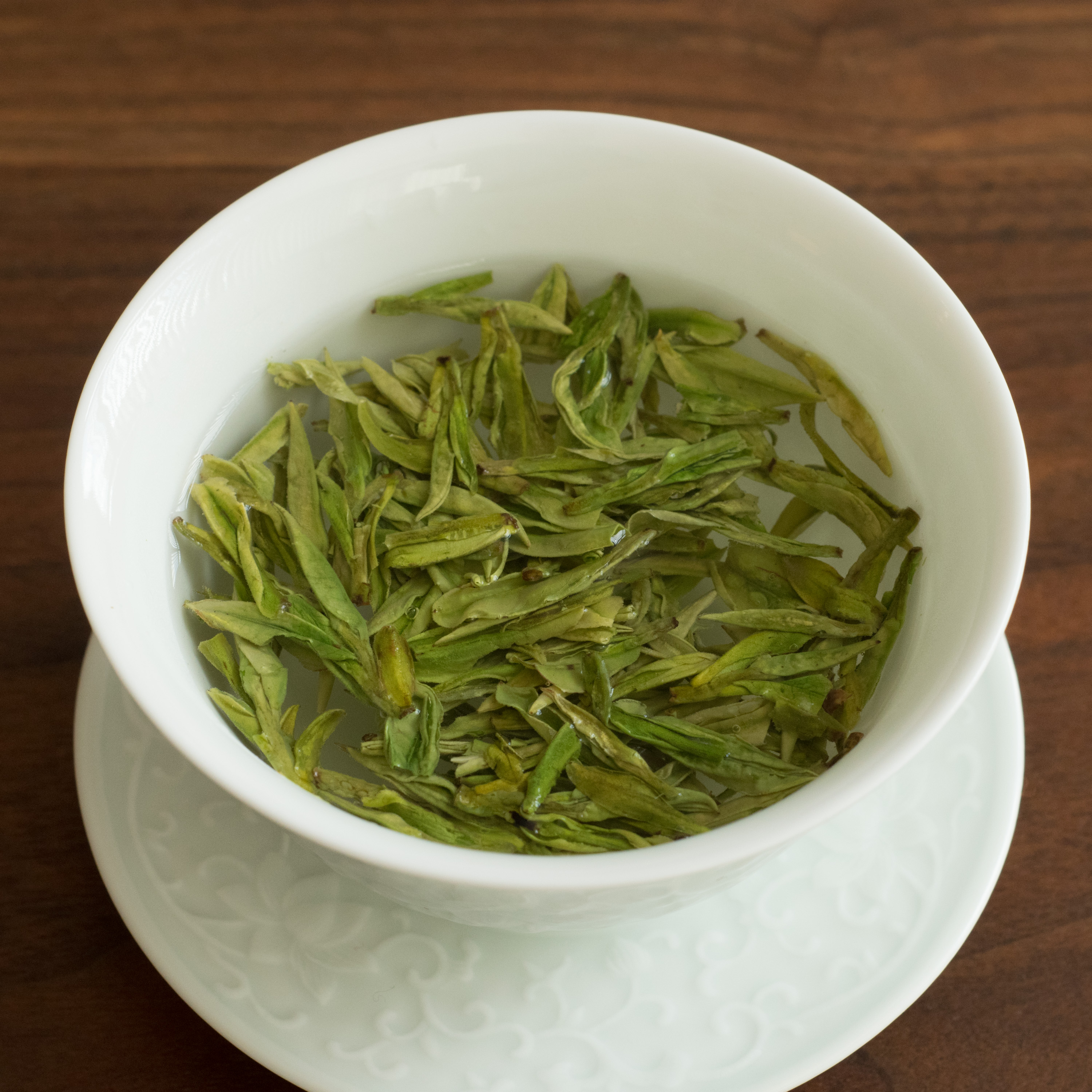
- Longjing tea being infused in a gaiwan
- Traditional Chinese: 茶
- Simplified Chinese: 茶
Transcriptions
Standard Mandarin
- Hanyu Pinyin: chá
- IPA: [ʈʂʰǎ]
Yue: Cantonese
- Yale Romanization: chàh
- Jyutping: caa4
- IPA: [tsʰa˩]
Southern Min
- Tâi-lô: tê

Chinese teas can be classified into six distinctive categories: white, green, yellow, oolong, black and post-fermented. Others add categories for scented and compressed teas. All of these come from varieties of the Camellia sinensis plant. Most Chinese teas are cultivated and consumed in China. It is commonly available in Chinese restaurants and grocery shops worldwide. Green tea is the most common type of tea consumed in China, while black tea is the second most common.

Within these main categories of tea are vast varieties of individual beverages. Some of the variations are due to different strains of the Camellia plant. However, the largest factor in the wide variations comes from differences in tea processing after the tea leaves are harvested. White and green teas are heat-treated (杀青; 殺青; shā qīng) soon after picking to prevent oxidation. Other differences come from variations in the processing steps.

== Categories ==
=== White ===
White tea is usually referred to as the least processed tea. It is delicate and sweet, and usually brewed into a light golden color depending on the variety. Usually, leaves wither in the open air immediately after picking and then dry to prevent any excessive oxidation. White tea is usually harvested and processed under very strict conditions, and for many people, a high shoot to leaf ratio (a large number of leaf buds rather than more mature leaves) is the preferred choice.

=== Green ===
For green tea, the tea leaves are harvested from camellia plants and then quickly heated and dried through frying or steaming to prevent excessive oxidation, which can turn the green leaves brown and alter their freshly picked taste.

=== Black ===
The difference between black tea and green tea is that during the production process, the tea leaves need to be completely oxidized before hot processing and drying. During the oxidation process, oxygen interacts with the cell walls of tea trees, causing the leaves to turn a rich dark brown to black color, which is famous for red tea.

=== Oolong ===
Oolong tea originated in China and was actually transliterated from two words in Mandarin, meaning "black" and "dragon". In addition to their inherent meanings, these two words also describe the shape of oolong leaves in a novel state. Oolong tea undergoes a unique semi oxidation process, ranging from 1% to 99%.

=== Yellow ===
The production process of yellow tea shares some similarities with green tea, except for the key point of making true yellow tea, which is oxidation before or after drying to give it a yellow appearance. Yellow tea began to be cultivated in the southeastern province of Sichuan, China around 2000 years ago.

== History ==
The practice of drinking tea has a long history in China, having originated there. Although tea originated in China, during the Tang dynasty, Chinese tea generally represents tea leaves which have been processed using methods inherited from ancient China. According to legend, tea was discovered by Chinese Emperor Shen Nong in 2737 BC when a leaf from a nearby shrub fell into water the emperor was boiling. The emperor was very interested in this new liquid because it had a pleasant aroma, so he drank the infusion and found it very refreshing, with a pleasant taste. He claims that tea brings vitality to the body; Therefore, tea was invented, but it is considered a medicinal beverage. Tea is deeply woven into the history and culture of China. The beverage is considered one of the seven necessities of Chinese life, along with firewood, rice, oil, salt, soy sauce and vinegar.

=== Song dynasty ===
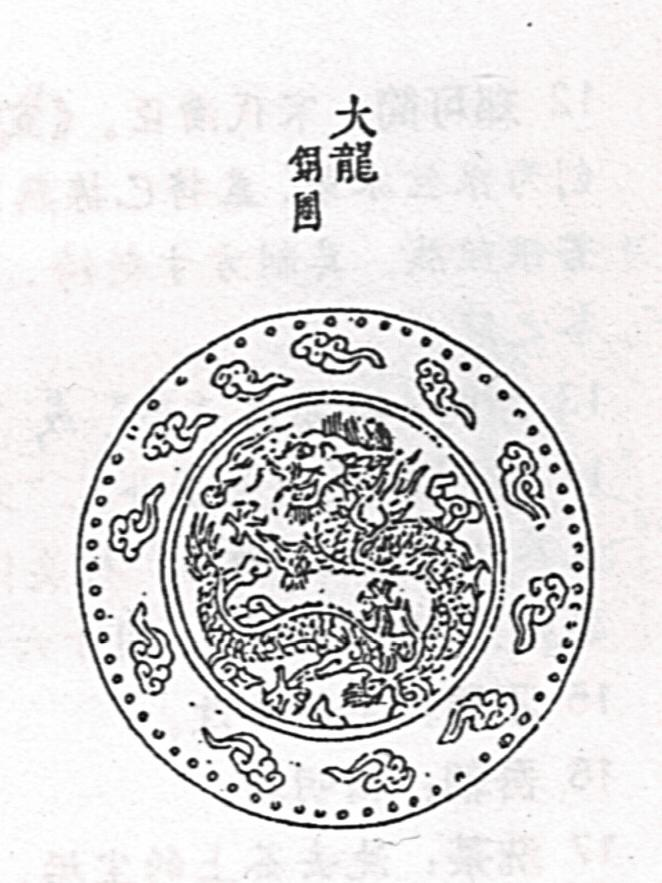
Large dragon tea cake

Tea was an important crop during the Song dynasty. Tea farms covered 242 counties during this time. This included expensive tribute tea, which was tea from Zhejiang and Fujian provinces that was exported to Southeast Asian and Arab countries.

In the Song dynasty, tea started to be pressed into tea cakes (usually black tea). Some were embossed with patterns of the Chinese dragon and the Phoenix, and were called exotic names including:

Large Dragon tea cake, Small Dragon tea cake, Surpassing Snow Dragon ball cake, Fine Silver Sprout, Cloud Leaf, Gold Money, Jade Flower, Inch of Gold, Longevity Sprout, Eternal Spring Jade Leaf, Dragon in the Clouds, Longevity Dragon Sprout, Dragon Phoenix and Flower, and Eternal Spring Silver Sprout.

=== Ming dynasty ===
The Ming dynasty scholar Wen Zhenheng's encyclopedic book Zhǎng Wù Zhì (simplified Chinese: 长物志; traditional Chinese: 長物志; Treatise on Superfluous Things), volume 12, contains the descriptions of several famous Ming dynasty teas.

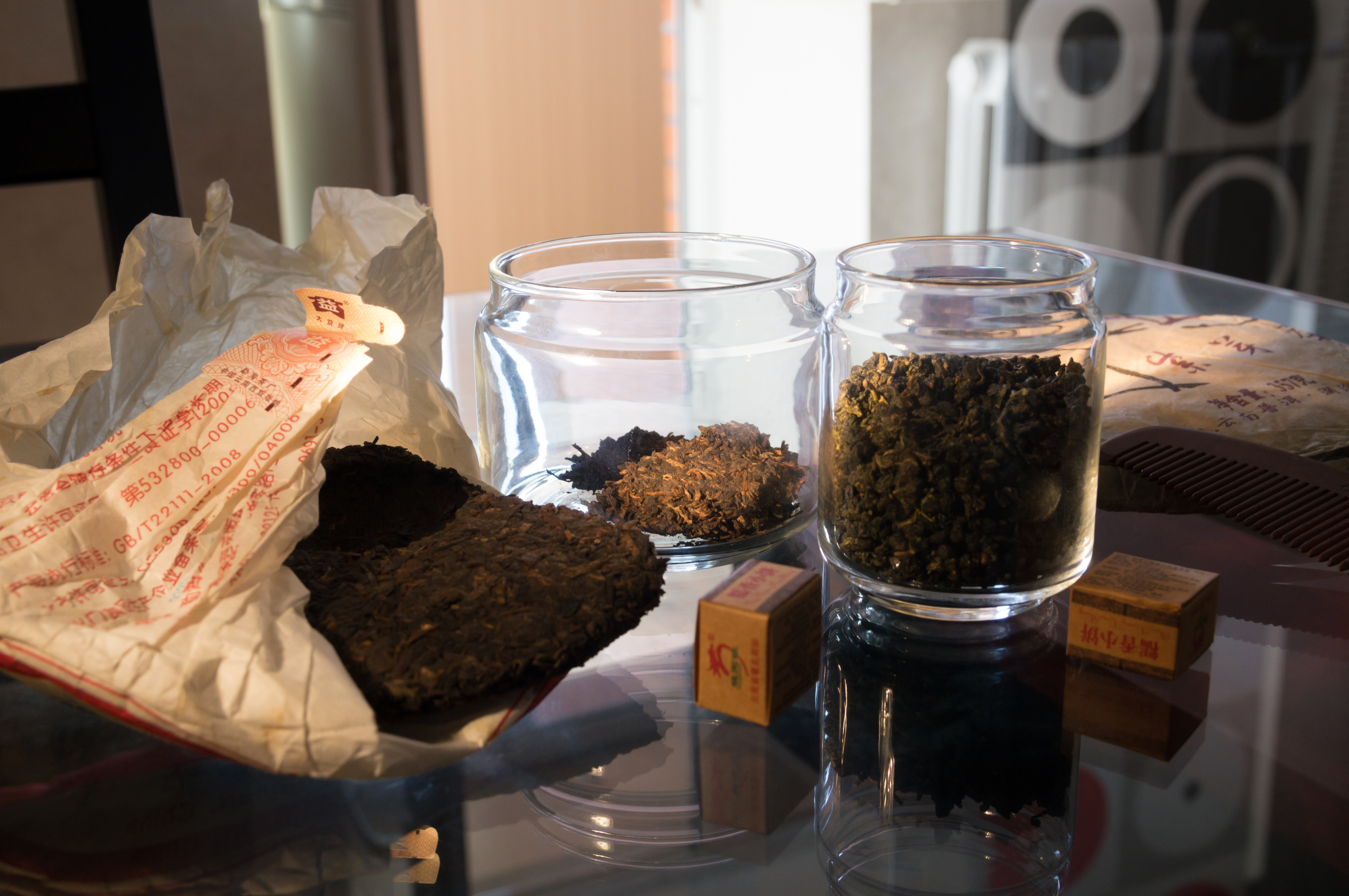
Pu'er tea and green tea from Yunnan

During Ming, tea was a form of currency also used to pay imperials tribute. Ming dynasty founder Zhu Yuanzhang (also known as the Hongwu emperor) was born to a poor family and understood the difficulties of the lives of farmers. He abolished the compressed tea brick style and replaced it with the whole, loose-leaf tea style, and also declared people instead pay tribute with tea buds. This amendment especially helped relieve tea farmers of some of the pressures of the laborious and complicated tea production processes. These complex processes for farmers included: steaming tea leaves, breaking them down into fine remnants, mixing the powder with plum juice, then baking them with molds to shape into tea bricks.

== Culture ==
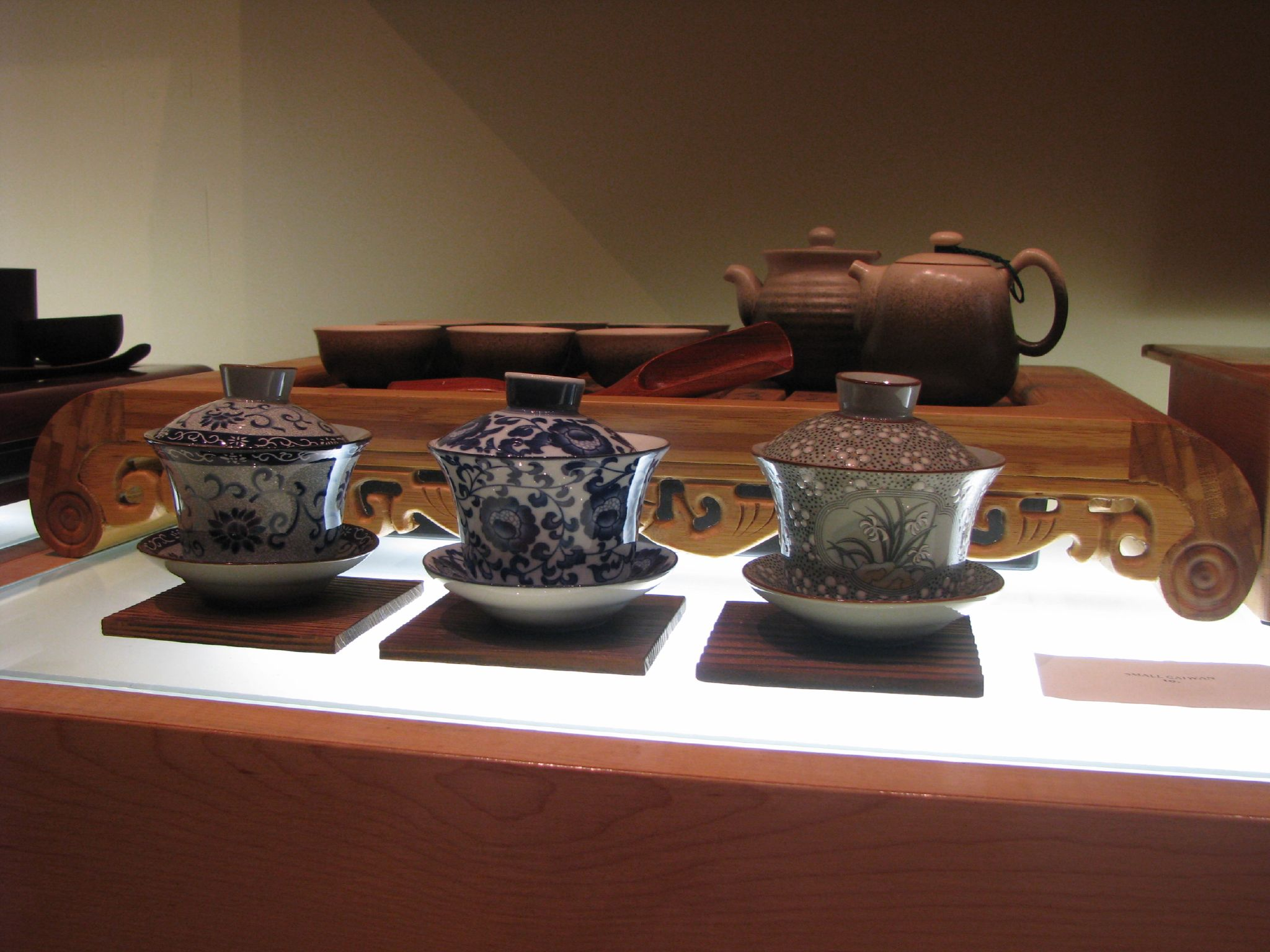
Chinese tea utensil including three gaiwan

=== Customs and etiquette ===
In some places of China, in restaurants, it is common for customers to clean their bowls and utensils at the table by rinsing them with tea from the pot. Tea may be poured over utensils into one of their bowls, or a larger bowl is may be provided as a waste receptacle for tea used to rinse bowls. In restaurants in China, tea is usually served in lieu of water, and hence tends to be a light drink flavoured.

However, when sipped as a daily beverage, Chinese people tend to use a special personal tea bottle, in which water is allowed to infuse with tea leaves for hours, and sipped continuously. This method, which is more prevalent in day-to-day Chinese life, involves the repeated use of the same tea leaves throughout the day.

=== Utensils ===
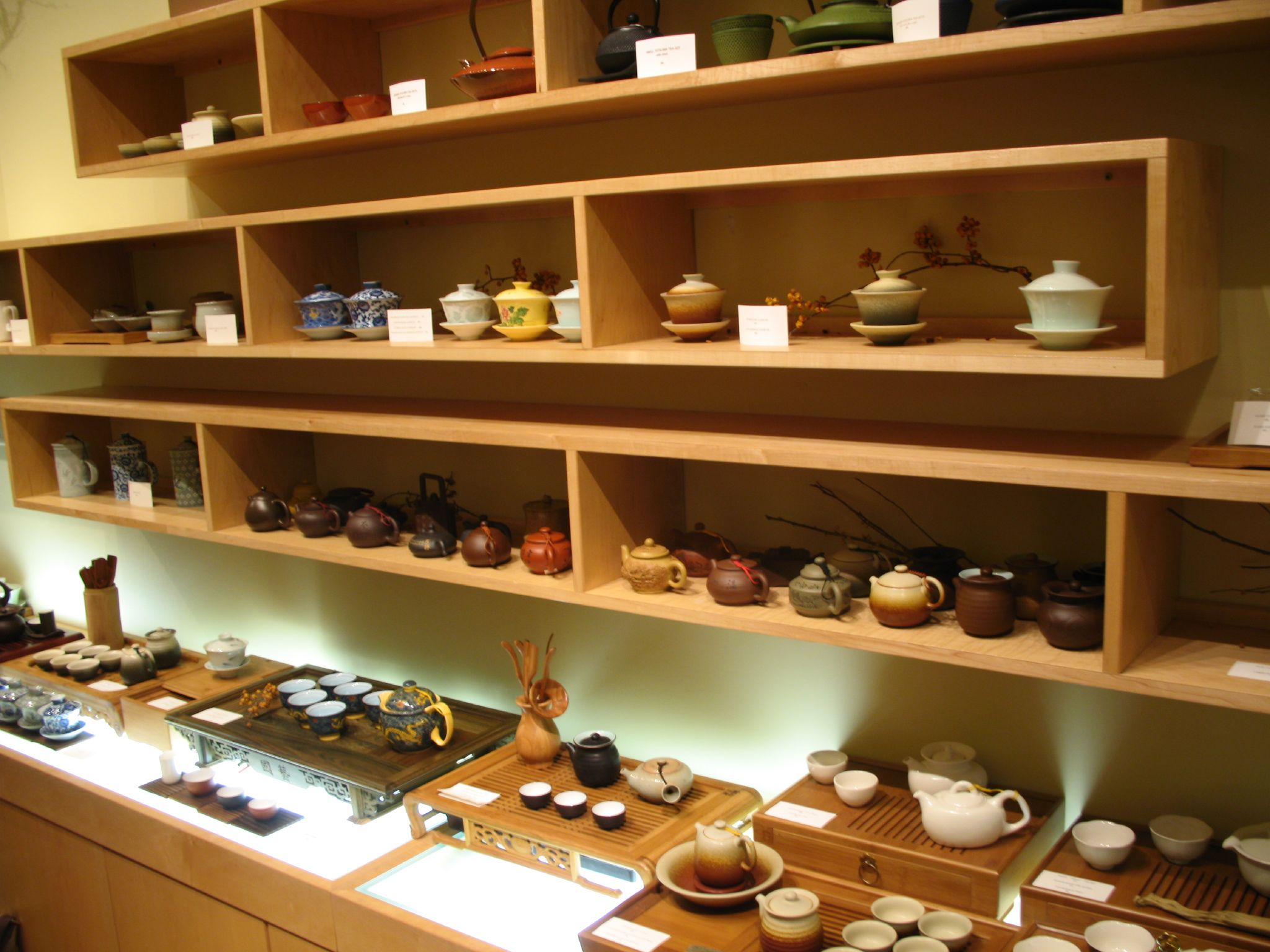
A collection of gaiwan, tea trays, Yixing teapots and other tea utensils

A traditional Chinese tea set consists of special clay or porcelain teapots, teacups, tea spoons, tea strainers, draining trays, tea forceps (for the leaves), a large forceps (for the tea cups) and occasionally, tea caddies. All of these are kept on a special wooden tea tray with an inbuilt draining arrangement and a holder for the drained water. however, in more modern times, specially built electric hotplates for tea sets are used by some Chinese people.

== Tea houses ==
Chinese tea houses refer to the public place where people gathered to drink tea and spend their spare time. Chinese tea houses have a long history. It first took shape during the Tang dynasty Kaiyuan era (713–714) and became common during the Song dynasty. From the Ming and Qing dynasties, tea house culture became integral to regional culture.

Drinking morning tea is a custom within various provinces regardless of what status or identity people are. People often go to tea house in twos to threes to relax, be entertained, and gather information all while sipping tea. One could find old folks reminiscing over their joys and sorrows, or youth discussing their ambitions.

In 1970s, Chinese tea houses spread to Hong Kong. Some notable ones include “Yen Yen”, “Tsui Heung Yuen”, “Pak Cheuk”, “Yin Bun Lau”, and “Wun Tin”, among others. Merchants would use tea houses as a place for exchanging information and business. For example, a jade merchant might complete a transaction in a tea house.

A tea garden is a tea house which features a Chinese garden or a domestic Chinese garden in which people enjoy their tea.

Chinese tea houses are one of the few traditional social institutions, and their broader social and cultural appeal outweighs their main business. From a historical perspective, it has been closely linked to the living structure of the Chinese people.

=== Ba-Shu culture and Sichuan teahouses ===
Sichuan teahouses have various sizes. The large ones have hundreds of seats, while the small ones, only a few. They also have excellent services. Traditional Sichuan teahouses use red copper teapots, tin saucers, teacups with covers made of Jingdezhen porcelain, tuocha- a bowl-shaped compressed tea leaves- and tearoom keepers expert at all manner of work. What's more, Sichuan teahouses have social functions. They play an important role in spreading the state affairs information. People can chat with each other there. They also serve as unofficial courts.

=== Wu-Yue culture and Hangzhou teahouses ===
Wu-Yue area is famous for tea producing and green tea produced in Zhejiang province play a decisive role. In Hangzhou, most tearooms are refined, simple and unsophisticated. They emphasize making tea with good-quality water and tasting tea in an excellent environment in order to achieve the true meaning of tea art.

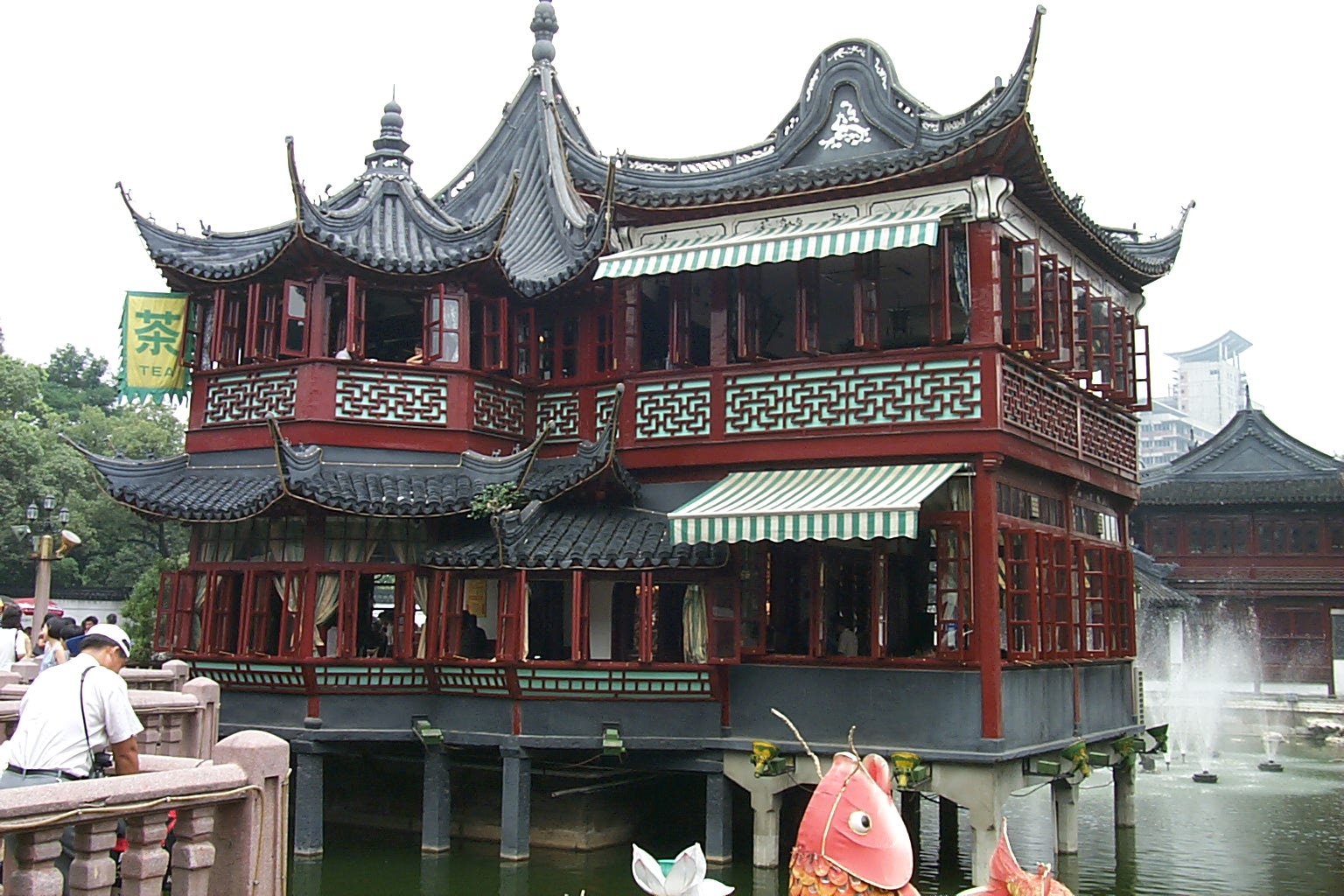
Shanghai-Huxinting Tea House

=== Tianjin teahouses, Shanghai Fuchaguan teahouses and Guangdong tearooms ===
Most of the Tianjin teahouses meet the needs of business people from different parts of China. People of various trades drink tea while eating refreshments and appreciating performances which include singing of opera arias, storytelling and dagu (a versified story sung to the accompaniment of a small drum and other instruments).

In the past, Shanghai teahouses are regarded as learned and refined places in Shanghai. Shanghai people called teahouses fuchaguan to express their longing for leisure. The most typical teahouse with local features was situated in the old Chenghuangmiao area.

The old Guangdong tearooms were inexpensive. Regular customers would be served with a cup of tea, and two steamed buns stuffed with diced grilled pork, steamed dumplings with the dough gathered at the top, or dumplings with shrimp stuffing. However, teahouses become different now. Nowadays, customers are provided with a pot of strong tea as soon as they arrive, and have many choices from a great variety of refreshments on the food cart.

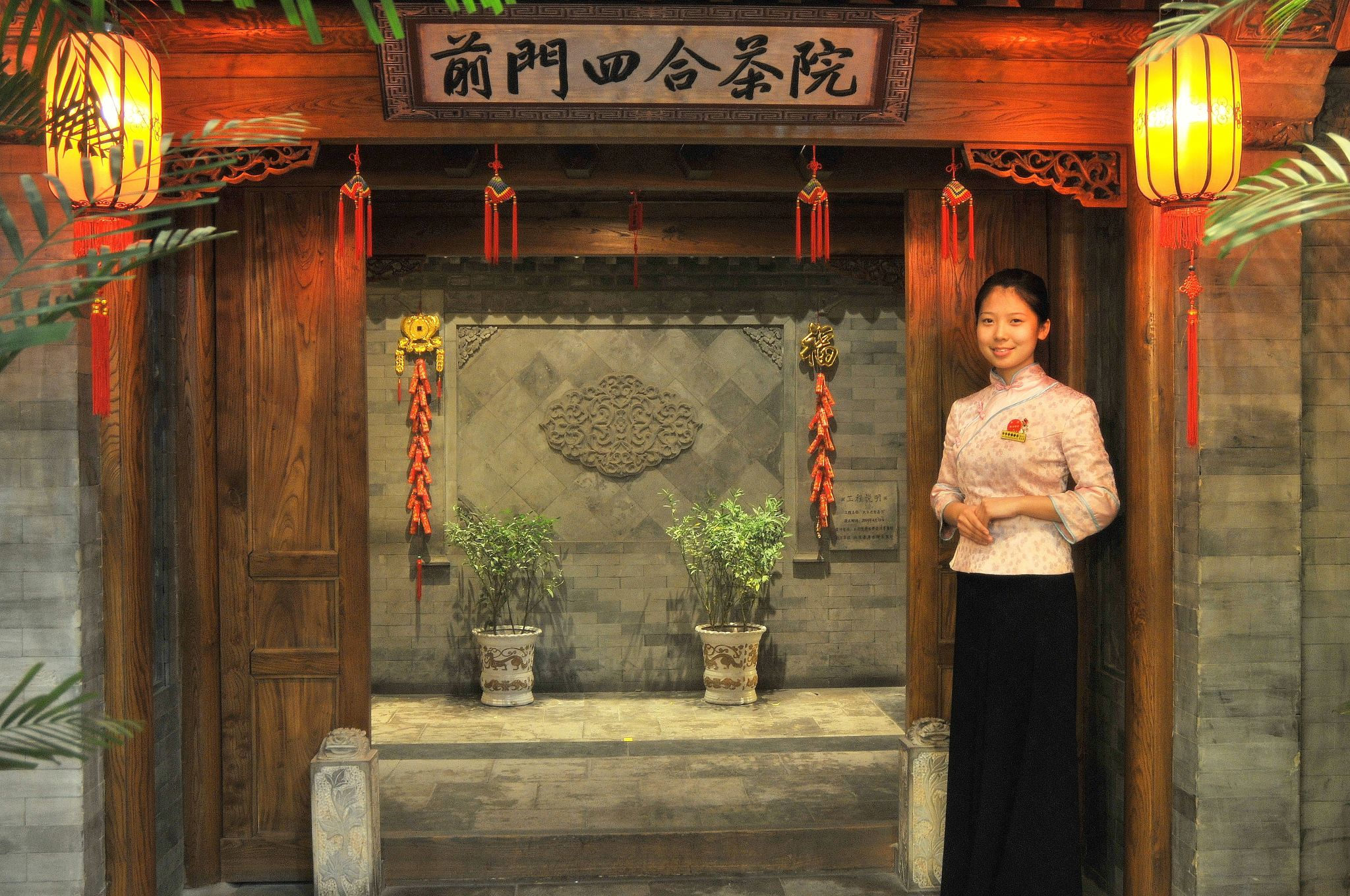
Chinese tea house, Beijing

=== Beijing teahouse culture ===
Beijing teahouses show most of the advantages of other local teahouses. They are known for their various functions, and rich and profound cultural aims.

There are many kinds of Beijing teahouses, which include Shuchaguan, Qingchaguan, Qichaguan, Yechaguan, Dachaguan, and Erhunpu.

=== Specific tea house types ===
Teahouse culture made a special contribution to the development of the novel, and shuchaguan was the best evidence to explain. At shuchaguan, tea is only acted as a medium and supplement because people came mainly to listen to storytelling. Storytelling was performed two times a day and a long story would last two or three months. Famous shuchaguan were exquisitely furnished with cane or wooden tables and chairs, and decorated with works of calligraphy and painting in order to build an atmosphere for storytelling. The purpose of drinking tea in shuchaguan is increasing their historical knowledge, killing time and amusing themselves. So shuchaguan were best suited to old people.

Qingchaguan provides places for people from all walks of life to entertain themselves elegantly. In the past, most of the Qingchaguan were simply furnished with square tables and wooden chairs. Teacups with covers were used to serve tea. However, tea was served without refreshment in Qingchaguan.

Qichaguan provides places for customers to play chess. Qichaguan were simply furnished with timber or lumps of wood painted with chess boards, which were partly buried in the ground, or chessboards with benches on both sides. When people played chess while drinking tea, they will feel that the chessboards was like a battlefield of life. Usually they would temporarily forget about their sufferings, and that's why tea was also called wangyoujun (Mr. Worry-free).

People went to Yechaguan to appreciate beautiful gardens. People of Beijing in old times were keen on enjoying beautiful scenes in different seasons. So yechaguan were mostly built in those places with beautiful gardens and nice views.

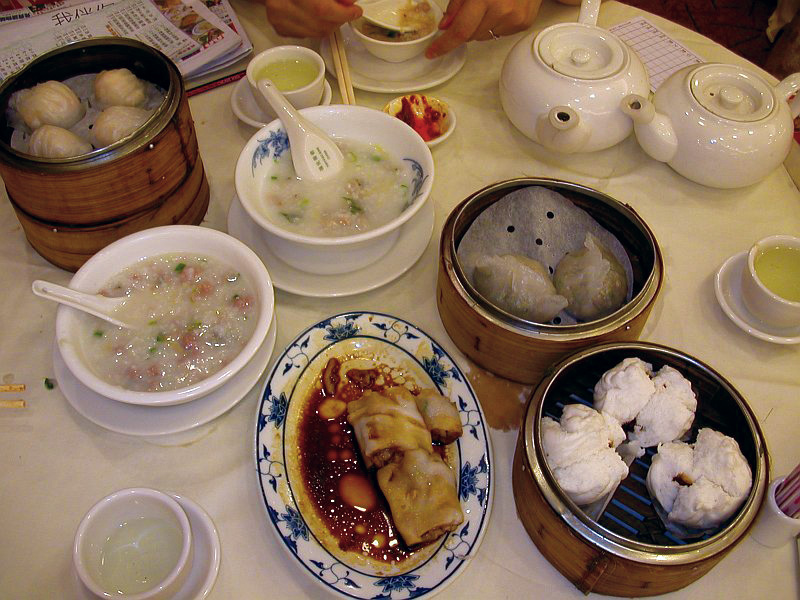
Some refreshments for Guangdong teahouse

Dachaguan provided tea, food and services to people in various trades such as business men and scholars. In terms of service, it includes Hongluguan, Wowoguan and Banhuguan.

Hongluguan were installed with red stoves which baked Manchurian and Chinese pastries. They served all kinds of pastries, which were smaller and more exquisite than those made by pastry shops. Customers could drink tea while sampling these pastries.

Wowoguan served various refreshment, including aiwowo, steamed sponge cakes, paicha, pengao and sesame seed cakes.

Characterized by a large copper pot, banhuguan suited varied tastes.

Erhunpu served tea without refreshments but provided dining and wining facilities. It supplied customers with food cooked from in-house ingredients or ingredients brought by customers.

== Literature ==
Literature about tea during the Ming dynasty largely focused on tea pickers, with writings and artwork regarding aspects such as tea picking and processing.

Tea-picking Poem - Gao Qi

It is getting warm after the spring rain and thunder,

New tea leaves start sprouting among branches.

Girls with silver hairpins sing folk songs to each other,

Competing to pick the most tea leaves in the shortest time.

They get home with the fresh scent of tea leaves on their hands,

The highest qualities will be sent to the Prefecture first.

The newly baked tea leaves are not tasted yet,

They are packed into baskets and will be sold to Hunan merchants.

Satirical poems and songs were also created and reflected struggles of tea farmers and ridiculed greedy officials. After Mid Ming, the amount of tribute tea soared due to an increased pressure upon citizens by higher bureaucrats. Officials demanded higher taxation and escalation of the requirement of tribute tea. Some citizens began to grow angry with these demands, including poets Gao Qi and Han Bangqi. Although their main occupations were government officials, they were also generally acknowledged writers who voiced their complaints through poems that became widespread folk ballads. Through their writings they requested the reduction of taxation and tributes. However, Gao was accused by the government of "involvement in a rebellion conspiracy” and was executed, while Han was imprisoned by officials wanting to hide their written works.

Fuyang Ballad - Han Bangqi

Tea-picking women and fish-catching men

Feudal officials torture them so they don't even have unscathed skin

How come the Heaven is not humane?

Have people here done anything wrong?

== Symbolism and significance ==
The China famous tea (Chinese: 中国名茶; pinyin: zhōng guó míng chá) or The Ten Great Chinese Teas (Chinese: 中国十大名茶; pinyin: zhōng guó shí dà míng chá) are the ten most notable Chinese teas. Below is a list of ten common teas in China.

Chinese	English	Region	Type
西湖龙井	Longjing tea (also spelled Lungching; 'Dragonwell')	Hangzhou, Zhejiang	Green tea
洞庭碧螺春	Biluochun tea (also spelled Pi lou chun, 'Green snail spring')	Suzhou, Jiangsu	Green tea
安溪铁观音	Anxi Tieguanyin tea	Anxi, Quanzhou, Fujian	Oolong tea
黄山毛峰	Huangshan Maofeng tea	Huangshan, Anhui	Green tea
武夷岩茶-大红袍	Wuyi tea, e.g., Da hong pao ('Big red robe')	Wuyi Mountains, Fujian	Oolong tea
君山银针	Junshan Yinzhen ('Jun Mountain silver needle')	Yueyang, Hunan	Yellow tea
祁门红茶	Keemun Black tea	Qimen, Huangshan, Anhui	Black tea
六安瓜片	Lu'an Melon Seed tea	Jinzhai, Lu'an, Anhui	Green tea
云南普洱	Yunnan Pu'er	Pu'er City, Yunnan	Post-fermented tea or "dark" tea
白毫银针	Baihao Yinzhen ('White tip silver needle')	Fuding, Ningde, Fujian	White tea

== Production ==
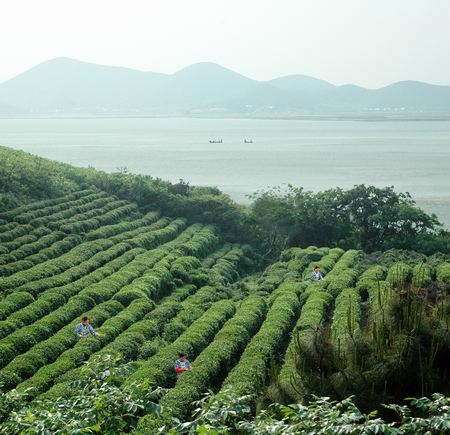
Green tea cultivation in China

Primary tea processing consists of no roasting, scenting, or spicing.

The highest grades of white tea, yellow tea, and green tea are made from tender tea shoots picked early spring. These young tea shoots may consist of a single terminal bud, a bud with an adjacent leaf or a bud with two adjacent slightly unfurled leaves. It is generally required that the leaves are equal in length or shorter than the buds.

The more-oxidized tea—such as red or oolong tea—are made from more mature leaves. For example, the Anxi Tieguanyin (grown in the tea region of Anxi in Fujian), is made from one bud with two to four leaves.

Not all high grade green tea is made from tender tea shoots. The green tea Lu An Gua Pian is made from matured leaves.

Traditionally these tender tea shoots are picked before 5 April, or Qingming Festival. The standard practice is to start picking when 5% of the garden is ready, or when the tea buds reach certain size. In some tea gardens, tea shoots are picked daily, or every 2 days.

=== Ming dynasty ===
==== Tea farmers ====
Tea households were normally small, family-based operations for tea cultivation. There were also tea merchants who set up tea firms to create their own tea plantations and/or to process tea leaves after buying from local tea farming families. Different from tea households, seasonal workers were often employed by tea firms. Seeking work during the harvesting seasons, they often took boats to Tunxi, Anhui and other places where tea leaves were abundant.

==== Tea production process ====
Harvesting tea was heavily dependent on weather conditions, so tea could not usually be produced throughout the entire year. Various weather conditions throughout different areas limited tea to be grown in a few specific regions: Jiangnan, Jiangbei, Hunan and Xinan. These areas provided stable warm weather and rainfall- two essential components of growing tea plants. The general production of loose, whole-leaf teas mainly included: tea seedling plantation, fertilization/weeding/spraying, tea picking, sunning/firing/rolling, and sorting and packaging.

===== Tea picking =====
Tea picking was a central component of the entire tea production process. Time spent working and the intensity of labor fluctuated due to the inability to accurately predict weather conditions. This created uncertainties regarding ideal tea picking times. However, generally “the ideal time for picking tea leaves was early morning before sunrise.” Tea pickers would usually leave their homes early and do work using careful techniques efficiently to ensure the leaves were gently picked in whole. To do so, pickers used one or both hands to nip the green stems with their index fingers and thumbs, then held the leaves until they had palms-full before tossing the leaves into their baskets. Women were preferred for this occupation because of their ability to more gently and carefully pick off the whole tea leaves. No matter the age or marital status, women were expected to be capable of performing this duty. However, there were also limitations on women during this time. According to Luo Lin's Explanation of Tea, women were not allowed to participate in any aspect of tea making during their menstrual periods. They were to avoid “female pollution” from their “unclean” bodies.

===== Sunning, firing and rolling =====
After picking tea leaves, families first sorted out the damaged or rotten leaves then began the sunning process. In the first stage, reduce its water content to about 60% -70%. This is achieved by placing tea leaves in large grooves on metal wire mesh. Then air passes through them, gently drying them out. This takes 12–17 hours to bend the leaves and prepare to roll them up. This process inhibited water evaporation within tea leaves to promote oxidation. Over-oxidation can alter the taste of the tea to become "grass-like" or thick and bitter, so farmers heated the leaves to stop the oxidation once the desired level was reached- a process known as 'firing'. Then, leaf cells were broken down by gently rubbing the tea leaves- this process helped volatilize the scents and tastes when brewing. Tea leaves were damped then rolled into shapes, making its storage convenient while also allowing sap to squeeze out and provide additional flavoring.

===== Sorting and packaging =====
Once the leaves were dried again, they were sorted and packaged and sold. Tea was usually "transported by a train of porters who used carrying poles to transport multiple chests of tea to the shippers", as the tea was largely sold to merchants and also largely produced to be exported.

== Trade ==
When tea gradually became more common in England in the 18th century, most British people tended to purchase tea grown in the Yangtze River Delta and Fujian region. China has experienced declining trends in tea export growth rate since the mid-1990s. Compare to 1980s that the export volume is decreased 232 tons to 170 tons, is around 26.7%, because the coverage of tea safety standards and Maximum Residual Limit of pesticides negatively affected China's exports.

The increase in export of green tea from China has not been commensurate with production. During 2010, China exported 234 M kg of green tea as against 163 metric kg in 2001. Its share of export in the global market has been found to fall from 87% to 78% between 2003 and 2007. However, in 2010, China contributed 79% of the total green tea exported worldwide.

== Varieties ==
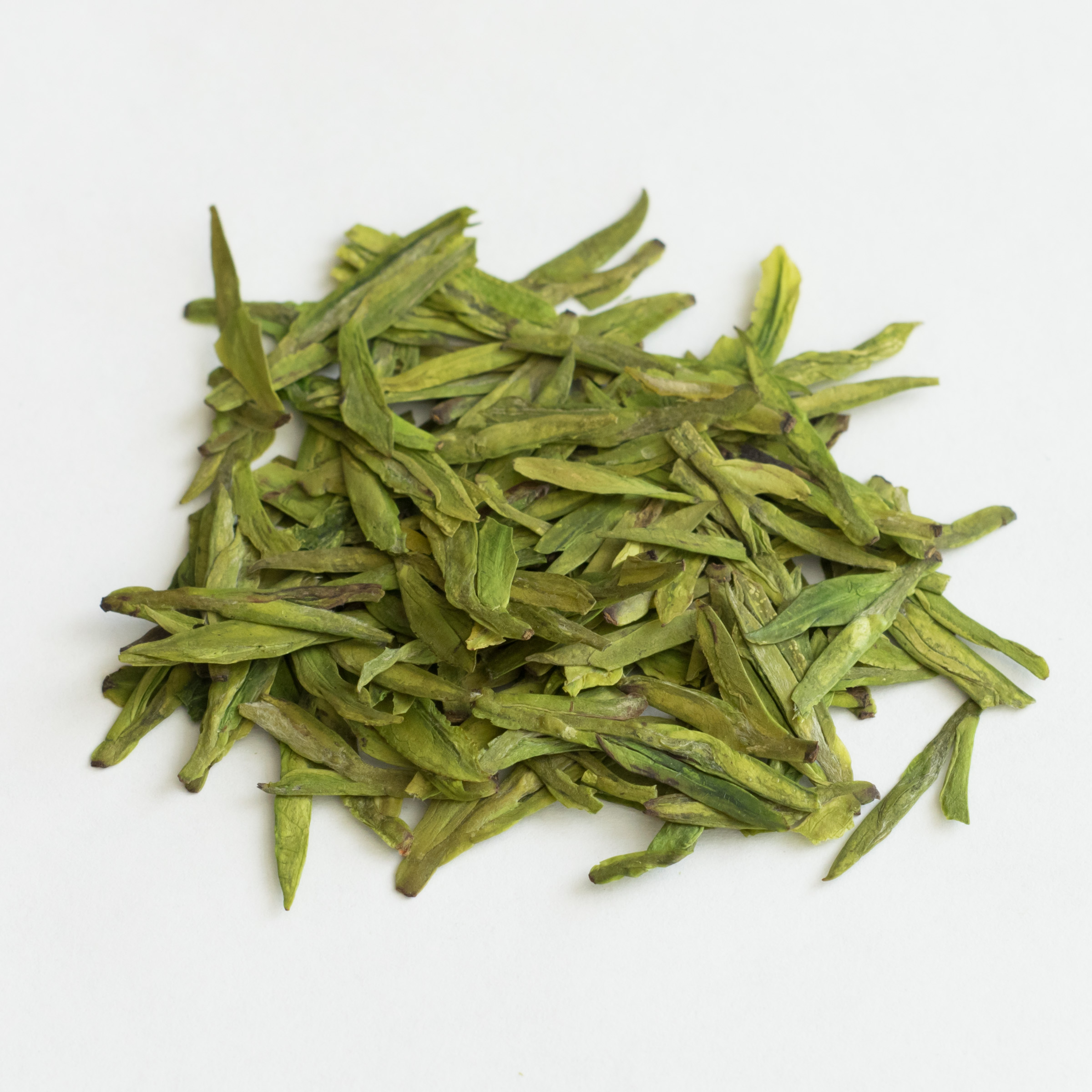
Longjing tea

Spelling of varieties often reflects English usage, and historical or southern-Chinese pronunciation rather than official modern pinyin, for example; Bohea (武夷茶 wǔyí chá), Congou (工夫 gōngfu), Hyson (熙春茶 xīchūn chá), Souchong (拉普山小種 lāpǔshān xiǎozhǒng), Chunmee (珍眉 zhēnméi), Sowmee (秀眉 xiùméi), Pekoe (白毫 báiháo), Keemun (祁門紅茶 qímén hóngchá).

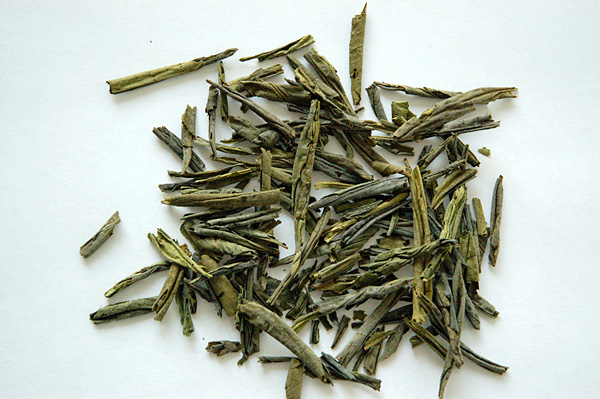
Lu'an Melon Seed tea

- Green tea
- White tea
- Black tea
- Oolong tea
- Pu-erh tea
- Yellow tea
- Chrysanthemum tea
- Jasmine tea
- Kuding tea
- Medicinal tea

== See also ==
- All In This Tea, a 2007 documentary
- List of Chinese teas
- Taiwanese tea
