= Tongzhi =

Tongzhi (Wade-Giles: T'ung-chih) can refer to:

- Tongzhi Emperor (1856–1875, reigned 1861–1875) of the Qing dynasty
  - Tongzhi Restoration (c. 1860–1874), an attempt to strengthen the late Qing dynasty
  - Tongzhi porcelain, a Chinese porcelain from Tongzhi Emperor's reign
- Tongzhi (encyclopedia), an 1161 Chinese encyclopaedia by Zheng Qiao
- Tongzhi (term), a term that could mean either "comrade" or "homosexual" in modern Chinese language
