= Lucky Dragon =

Lucky Dragon may refer to:

- Lucky Dragon No. 5 (film), a 1959 Japanese film directed by Kaneto Shindo
- Lucky Dragon Hotel and Casino, a defunct hotel and casino in Las Vegas, Nevada
- Daigo Fukuryū Maru, a Japanese fishing boat exposed to nuclear fallout from a 1954 weapon test at Bikini Atoll
- Lucky Dragons, an experimental music group based in Los Angeles, California
- Hyson or Lucky Dragon Tea
- Lucky Dragon, a surveillance operation by the US Air Force's 4080th Strategic Reconnaissance Wing during the Vietnam War
- Luciobarbus brachycephalus, a carp-like fish
