= Tongzhi porcelain =

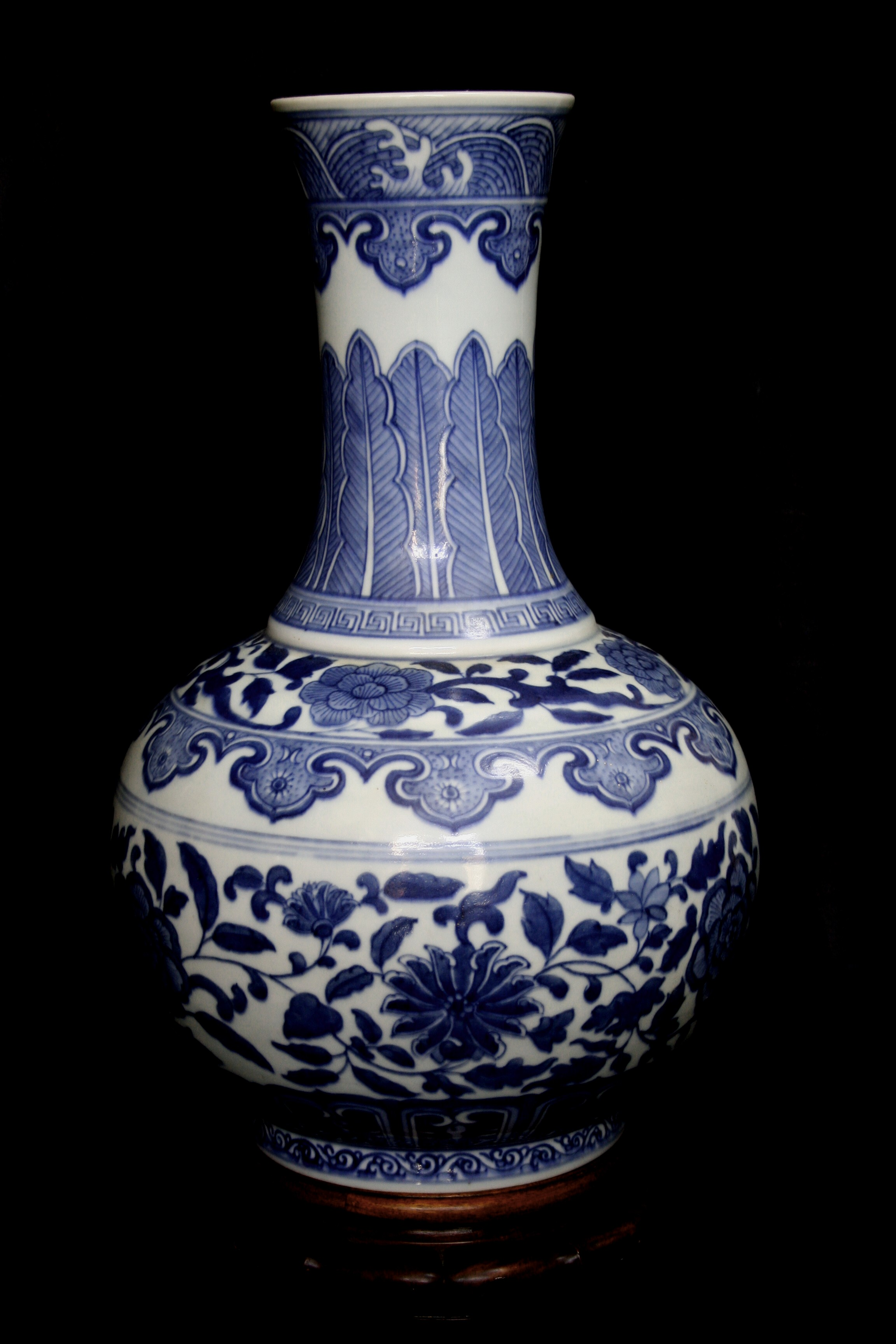
Imperial Presentation Vase, Tongzhi Mark and Period, Nantoyōsō Collection, Japan

Tongzhi porcelain is Chinese porcelain from the reign of the Qing dynasty Tongzhi Emperor (1862–1874), which saw the reconstruction of the Jingdezhen official kilns after the Taiping Rebellion of the 1850s completely devastated the cities of Nanjing and Jingdezhen.

Already by 1853, Nanjing had fallen and was made the capital by the rebel forces. Eventually, Zeng Guofan led Qing imperial forces to defeat the rebels and restore Qing rule in Nanjing. The period was one of continued unrest. In 1856, the British attacked Guangzhou, Guangdong. They invaded the capital Beijing, looting and burning the Old Summer Palace. It was against this background of these events, and others, that the Tongzhi Emperor took to the throne and palace functions were partially restored. The official palace ceramic wares of this period are thought to reflect this general historical unrest and decline. The Jingdezhen area itself was liberated by Li Hongzhang in 1864.

The new imperial kilns were to be under the directorship of the official Cai Jinching. After completion a list of ceramic wares was forwarded to the Tongzhi Emperor and is preserved in the area gazetteer Jiangxi tongzhi (江西通志) for 1864. The 55 types of wares listed consisted of round wares (yuanqi) and vases (zhuoqi), but no quantities are given. The ceramics of this period are similar to those of the previous Daoguang period (1821–1850), but of slightly higher quality, perhaps because the court now took more interest than under the three previous emperors. Many of the artisans of the early 19th century must have continued in their profession with the restoration of the kilns. Some scholars believe the wares on the 1864 list were produced at commercial kilns in Jingdezhen, rather than rebuilt official ones.

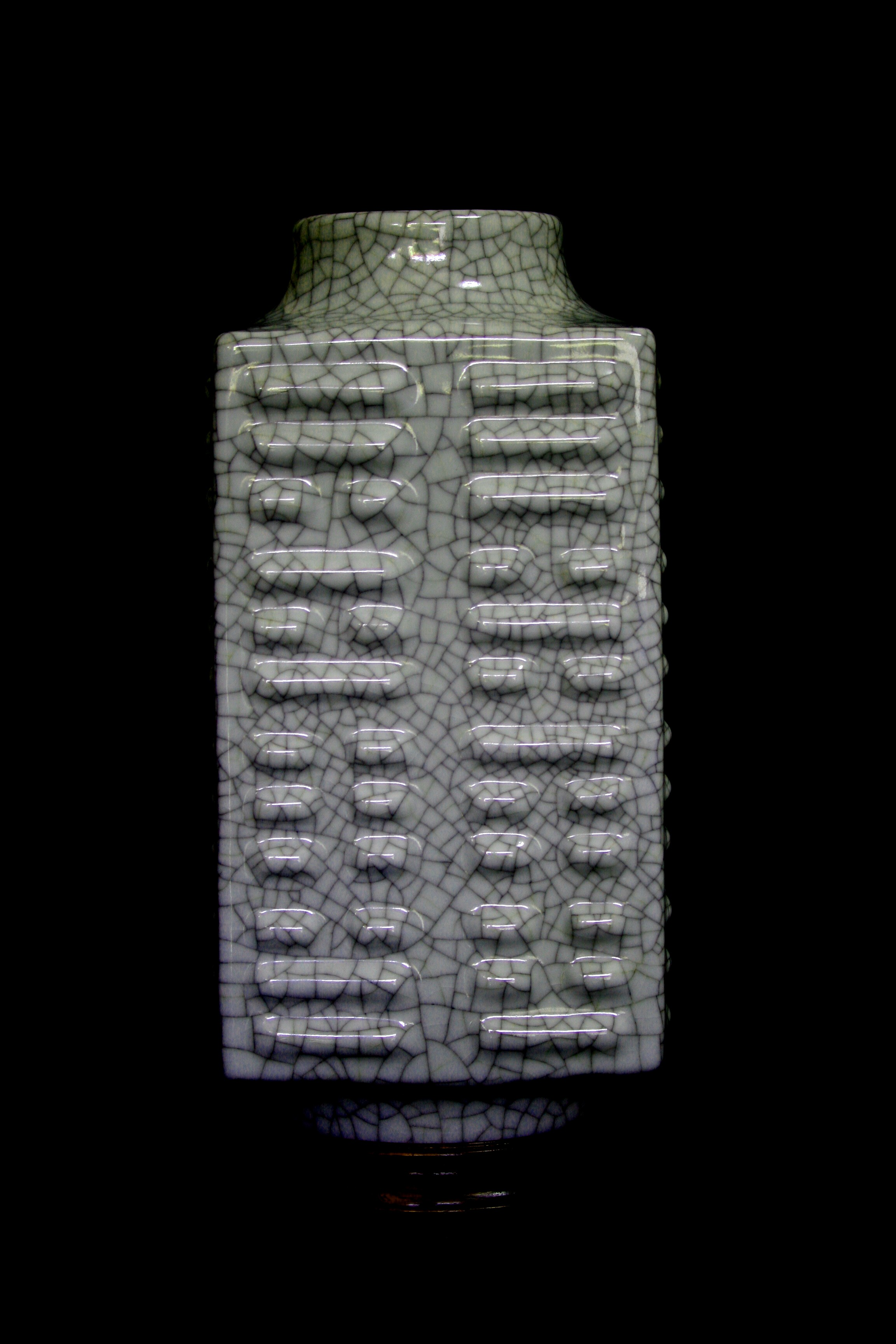
Eight Triagrams Quadrangular Vase, Tongzhi Mark and Period, Nantoyōsō Collection, Japan

Two ceramic artists associated with later productions of Qianjiang ware or porcelain decorated in sepia and pale umber pigments, Wang Shaowei and Jin Pinqing, are said to have been employed in the Tongzhi era as decorators at Jingdezhen. Certainly there was a quantitative disparity. The extant list of Tongzhi ceramics include such items as quadrangular vases with the Eight Triagrams and other items. Extant under glaze blue vases are renditions of classic shapes and patterns continuously celebrated from the 18th century.
