= Hyson =

Chinese green tea

- Type: Green
- Other names: Lucky Dragon Tea
- Origin: China
- Quick description: Good bodied, warm, spring-like in flavor

Hyson, or Lucky Dragon Tea, is a Chinese green tea that comes from the Anhui province of China. It is made from young leaves that are thinly rolled to have a long, twisted appearance that unfurls when brewed. The name Hyson is probably derived from an Amoy name (Chinese: 熙春茶; Pe̍h-ōe-jī: hi-chhun-tê; lit. 'flourishing spring tea'), although there are also anecdotal claims that it was named after an English tea merchant, Phillip Hyson. Hyson is graded into the following three categories: Mi Si, Cheng Si and Fu Si.

While hyson tea is often thought of as a low-grade or mediocre quality tea, young hyson is considered high quality. It is harvested earlier, "before the rains", and has a full-bodied, pungent taste and is golden in color. Young hyson tea is subdivided into Chun Mee (a hard, small, twisted leaf), Foong Mee (a long, large, curly leaf), Saw Mee (a small, non-hard, twisted leaf), and Siftings. It is also sometimes classified as First, Second, and Third Young Hyson. The Chinese name for young hyson is Yu Chin Ch'a and is categorized as the following: Mi Yu, O Yu, I Yu, Ya Yu as well as Si Yu.

== Serving methods ==
Hyson tea has been described as light, warm, smooth, good-bodied, earthy, sunny, and spring-like in flavor. It can be served hot or iced. Milk and sugar are not typically added and are thought by some to diminish the flavor of hyson tea, but cold hyson tea is often garnished with lime or lemon.

== Historical and literary references ==
Despite often being considered of mediocre quality, hyson tea was highly prized by the 18th century British and tea tax on hyson tea was higher than for other teas. During the Boston Tea Party hyson tea represented 70 of the more than three hundred chests of tea that were destroyed.

Hyson tea is referenced in the first stanza of "Xenophanes" by Ralph Waldo Emerson, 1847: "By fate, not option, frugal Nature gave One scent to hyson and to wall-flower, One sound to pine-groves and to waterfalls, One aspect to the desert and the lake."

The English essayist Charles Lamb mentions Hyson tea in his essay "Old China", which appears in the collection Essays of Elia (Last Essays of Elia, published 1835): "I was pointing out to my cousin last evening, over our Hyson (which we are old fashioned enough to drink unmixed still of an afternoon) some of these speciosa miracula upon a set of extra-ordinary old blue china".
