= Way of tea =

Way of tea may refer to:

- Japanese tea ceremony
- Chinese tea ceremony
