= Ueda Sōko-ryū =

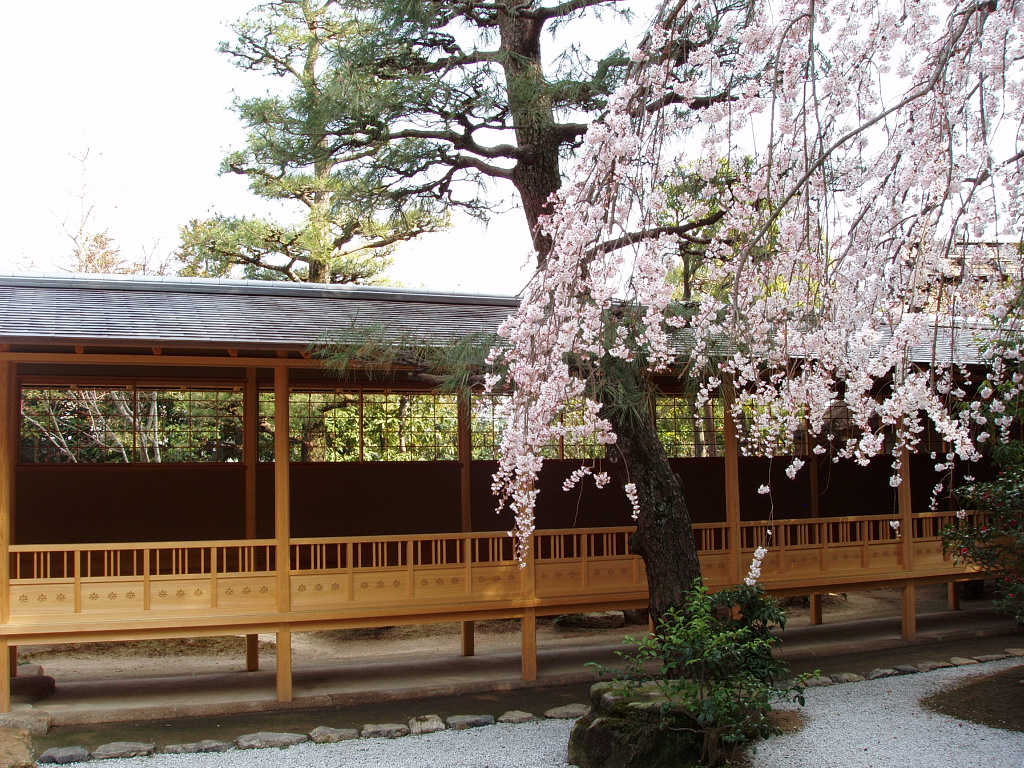
Garden of the Ueda Sōko-ryū in Hiroshima (2008)

Ueda Sōko-ryū (上田宗箇流) is a cultural aesthetic practice, or tradition, of Japanese tea ceremony that originated within the samurai class of feudal Japan. The tradition is commonly called the Ueda Sōko Ryū or Ueda Ryū (Ryū meaning "Tradition" or "School" in Japanese). The founder from whom the tradition takes its name was Sengoku period warlord Ueda Sōko. The customs, etiquette and values of the samurai are woven throughout all aspects of the tradition's practice of chanoyu, a practice that has continued unbroken for over 400 years.

== Ueda Sōko ==
"Kuginuki-mon", the family crest of Ueda Sōko. The crest represents a large nail-pull used in constructing temples.

After first serving Niwa Nagahide as a page, Ueda Sōko was later chosen by Toyotomi Hideyoshi as one of his aides and daimyō. Ueda learned chanoyu from Sen no Rikyu and Furuta Oribe before establishing his own style of chanoyu, deeply influenced by the values and customs of the samurai of the Sengoku period (mid 15th-early 17th century). Since Ueda's time the Ueda School has continued for 16 generations under an iemoto system. The present and 16th iemoto is Ueda Sōkei.

Ueda Sōko is famous as one of the leading garden designers of the Momoyama period (1568–1603). He is well known for designing and constructing many gardens listed in Japan as places of great scenic beauty. These include Shukkeien (Hiroshima prefecture), Tokushima Castle Front Palace Garden (also known as Senshūkaku-teien, Tokushima Prefecture), Nagoya Castle Garden (Ninomaru-teien, Nagoya prefecture), Wakayama Castle's Nishinomaru-teien and Kokuwadera-teien (Wakayama prefecture).

Following the Siege of Osaka (1614–1615), the Toyotomi clan was disbanded in 1619 and Ueda relocated to Hiroshima under his lord Asano Nagaakira who was to become daimyō of the Geishū Domain (Hiroshima Domain). Ueda was given a fief in the West of Hiroshima prefecture yielding 17,000 koku of rice (around 2,788 tonnes) and became Asano's chief retainer for the Geishū Domain.

As chief retainers of the Geishsū Domain, the Ueda family governed their land in West Hiroshima for generations. Sōko's chanoyu was passed down through the generations and continues to thrive today.

== History ==
In 1619 (Fifth year of Ganwa Era), Asano Nagaakira was appointed as daimyō of the Geishū Domain, making him Lord of Aki Province and half of Bingo Province amounting to land of 426,500 koku of rice (roughly modern-day Hiroshima Prefecture). Ueda Sōko went to Geishū in special servitude to Lord Asano. Sōko was assigned a fief 17,000 koku of rice in the West of Hiroshima prefecture to go with his appointment as Asano's Chief Retainer. Sōko enlisted Nomura Kyūmu and Nakamura Mototomo as his vassals and granted them each a fief of 100 koku of rice. Sōko invested the teaching of his style of chanoyu to the two families (a role called "Chaji Azukari" or "holders of the teachings of chanoyu"). Under Sōko's direction, the Nomura and Nakamura families taught and conducted chanoyu for the Asano and Ueda families.

In the middle of the Edo Period the number of people practicing chanoyu was increasing. The Sen Traditions of Tea were the first to establish the Iemoto system around this time. Then during the Bunka and Busei Eras (1804–1819) the Sōden grading system was established, again by the Sen Traditions. The Ueda Sōko Tradition spread wider than just the Samurai class of Geishū. The Ueda Sōko Tradition was practiced by regular townsfolk and people throughout the Kansai and Chu-Shikoku regions. This called for a new level of formality around the teaching of the School. The retainers of the Ueda Tradition, Nomura Sōkyū, Nomura Yokyū, and Nakamura Taishin established a new Sōden System in 1839 (Tenth year of Tenbō Era). This new Sōden System placed Ueda Sōko's style of Tea into a form that was able to be transmitted in a systematic format through generations. It dictated the highest license, the Shin Daisu, was to be kept in the Ueda Family and the other licenses were to be issued by the Chaji Azukari. In the Sōko sama o-kikigaki or Notes from Sōko, there is the record "Sōko received a license from Oribe". This shows the Ueda Sōko Tradition transmitted through generations is a style of Tea heavily influenced by Oribe, and a tradition that places the Shin Daisu as the highest license achievable.

The Domains of Japan were dissolved with the Meiji Restoration, and all Tea Masters serving the daimyōs of domains found themselves without employment. The 12th Grandmaster Ueda Yasuatsu was the head of the Ueda Family through the twilight years of the Tokugawa shogunate rule, and into the Meiji period. In 1870 (Third Year of Meiji) he retired from worldly affairs and became a Buddhist monk, taking the name Jōō. Until his death in 1888 (21st Year of Meiji) Jōō devoted himself to chanoyu and in this way his life resembled the life of Ueda Sōko. Jōō continued to employ Nakamura Kaidō and Nomura Ensai as Chaji Azukari throughout the Meiji Period, and the two families served in this role until 1955 (30th Year of Shōwa). The Ueda Sōko Tradition of Tea continues today as a tradition representative of Warrior Tea, born in Momoyama Period (1568–1598) Japan. The warlords of this period lived in a ruthless time where the threat of death was an intimate part of daily life. The Tea of the Momoyama period samurai class is therefore a style of Tea that seeks quietude for the mind. The Ueda Tradition of Tea continues as a practice for learning one's true heart through the Way of Tea.

== Characteristics of the Ueda Sōko tradition of Japanese tea ceremony (chanoyu) ==
The Ueda Sōko Tradition of Chanoyu is:

- a Warrior Class school of tea (chanoyu) that continues unbroken from the Momoyama Period (about 1573–1603) to the present day
- a school where one can see the unique aesthetic of Ueda Sōko, an aesthetic that combines the influence of (a) Rikyū's beauty of tranquility: a type of beauty that emerges from subtle movement in a world of stillness and shadows and (b) Oribe's beauty of liberation: an atmosphere of primordial emancipation that arises from a world of light, space and free-flowing forms. Ueda Sōko combined the influence of both his teachers to create an elegant and dignified aesthetic referred to as "utsukushiki".
- the only school that has restored the headquarters of the Iemoto to the original layout of the Edo Period Samurai residence complete with the tearoom complex 'Wafūdō' and shoin reception building. The Ueda school also maintains many historical tea equipages, artefacts, and ancient texts with great historical significance for the history of chanoyu
- a school known for its dignified, elegant beauty. The characteristic movements of the Ueda Sōko Tradition's tea preparing ceremony (temae) are dignified and beautiful. This is achieved by composing movements of straight lines and eliminating all unnecessary movement. The school emphasises the yin/yang balance in the practitioner which usually results in a stronger aesthetic for men and a softer aesthetic for women (in line with Samurai culture of the Momoyama Period).

More specifically, the above points entail:

- The tea preparing ceremonies (temae) are different for men and women
- The way of bowing for men and women is different
- The purifying cloth (fukusa) is worn on the right side of the obi (a samurai's sword is fixed in the left side of the obi and this side is left free out of respect for the sword, and in case one has to suddenly exit the tearoom, fix their sword to their obi and start battle)
- The way of handling the bamboo ladle (hishaku) and purifying cloth (fukusa) is very distinctive in the Ueda Tradition. E.g. Men handle the bamboo ladle as if riding a horse in battle, resheathing their sword and draw water as if handling an arrow
- The movements in the tea preparing ceremony (temae) are composed of straight lines, and the movements flow with the breath. Performing the ceremony in harmony with the breath rejuvenates one's spirit: the emphasis is on releasing one's breath and energy "from inside to out, from inside, to out"

=== Wabi-cha and Warrior Tea ===
Wabi-cha is a style of chanoyu developed in the Momoyama period that gives precedence to chanoyu practiced in koma (four and a half mat-size and smaller) tea rooms using rustic equipages amid a sombre atmosphere; all natural conclusions from emphasising the aesthetic concept of wabi. The Ueda Ryū is a School of chanoyu that values wabi-cha and emphasises wabi aesthetics. Another dimension to the Ueda Ryū is that since the Momoyama period it has continued as one of the unique Traditions of chanoyu known as bukeh-cha, or 'warrior tea', which are traditions of chanoyu that originated in and were developed by the samurai class. Accordingly, warrior tea traditions of chanoyu are noticeably rich with the culture and customs of the samurai. The Ueda School now has wide repute as a tradition representative of warrior tea.

=== Tea Drinking in the Ueda Sōko tradition ===
The Ueda Tradition is a school of tea of the samurai class that originated in the Momoyama period (1568–1598). The warlords of this period lived in a ruthless time where the fear of death was present in daily life. The tea of the Momoyama period samurai class is therefore a style of tea that seeks quietude for the mind and strength of spirit.

=== The Temae of the Ueda Sōko tradition ===
The temae (tea preparing ceremony) of the Ueda Tradition is often said to be elegant and beautiful. There are two reasons for this appearance.

First, the actions of the temae are in straight lines with all unnecessary movement eliminated. This creates a clean, dignified appearance that is invigorating for the practitioner.

Second, actions are performed similar to the in-to-out flow of the breath (e.g. cleaning the whisk (chasendōji), rotating the tea bowl and whisking the tea). With practice, the temae can be performed in natural flowing harmony with the breath. From an 'unshakeable core expanding out' is the fundamental direction of assertive action and the tea ceremony of the Ueda Tradition is based on this fundamental. To captures this in the temae, the practitioner moves at one with an energising in-to-out flow of breath.

These two aspects of (1) invigorating, clean actions in straight lines, and (2) the strength of actions performed in harmony with the in-to-out flow of the breath, contribute to the dignified and beautiful appearance of the temae of the Ueda Tradition.

=== Utensils and the body ===
An ideal of the Ueda Tradition is for utensils and the body to come together in harmony. One therefore does not slouch or handle objects by moving just the arms. Instead, handling objects from the central axis of the body is of fundamental importance. Objects are handled with a composed and stable posture; at navel height, 3 cm behind the tip of the knees and with the space of an egg open under the arms. Objects are held firmly with the thumb and middle finger and the index finger is added more lightly. Objects are not placed down just by moving one's arms; the whole body is used when placing objects down. The eyes also focus on the utensil that is being used at that particular moment. Harmony is achieved when the utensil, body, arms, breath and eyes all move together.

== Ueda Sōko's teacher, Furuta Oribe ==
Furuta Oribe 古田 織部 (c. 1544 – July 6, 1615) is the most celebrated tea master in history after his teacher Sen Rikyu. Unlike the merchant Rikyu, Oribe was a member of the samurai class and he led the development of a style of tea suited to cultural values of the samurai class known as buke-cha (warrior tea). Oribe held daimyō status and was originally a retainer of Oda Nobunaga and Toyotomi Hideyoshi before serving the Tokugawa clan.

Oribe became the foremost tea master in Japan after Rikyū's death, and taught the art of chanoyu to the 2nd Tokugawa shōgun, Tokugawa Hidetada. Among his other famous tea ceremony students were Kobori Enshū, Honami Kōetsu and Ueda Sōko. The artistic influence of the still-popular Oribe-ware style of ceramics is attributed to Oribe and bears his name accordingly. He also designed a style of stone lantern (tōrō) for the roji tea garden, known as Oribe-dōrō.

During the Osaka Campaign of 1615, Oribe was suspected of treason against the Tokugawa and ordered to commit ritual disembowelment (seppuku), along with his son. As Oribe's family was wiped out following his seppuku, his tea legacy continued with Ueda Sōko, a student of Oribe's for 24 years. Sōko exiled to Shikoku following the Osaka Campaign for three years before being invited to serve the Asano clan as their chief retainer and tea master in the Hiroshima domain. One settled in Hiroshima, Ueda Sōko defined his style of tea heavily influenced by Oribe.

== Reconstruction of the Ueda Clan Residence of Hiroshima Castle ==
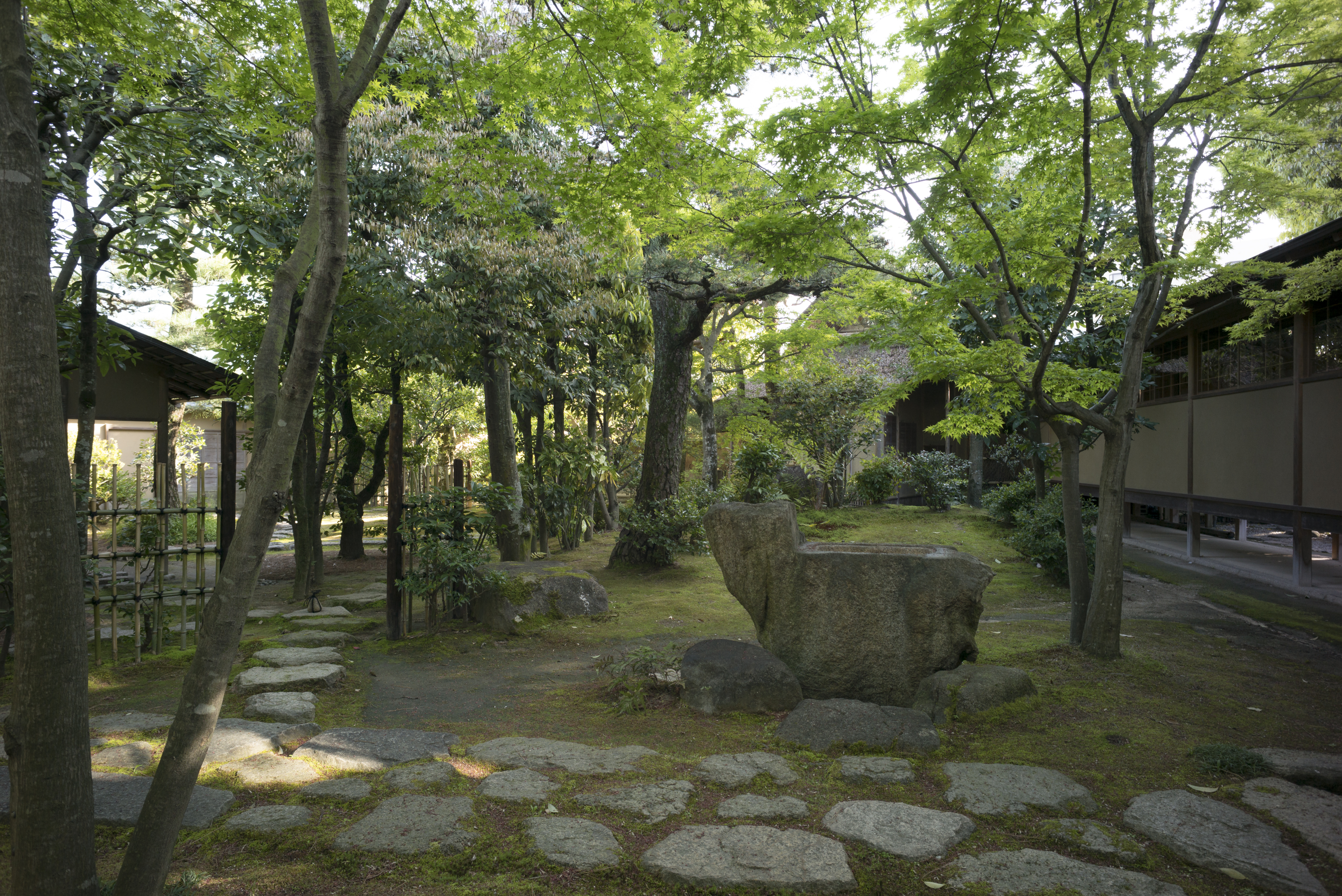
Inner tea garden (uchi-roji) at Wafūdō, the home of the Ueda Sōko-ryū in Hiroshima (2015)

In the 5th year of the Genwa Era (1619) the Tokogawa Shogunate assigned the Geishū Domain and the Yattsu District of the Bingo Domain to Asano Nagaakira, a total fief of 126,500 koku of rice. Ueda Sōko relocated to Hiroshima with Nagaakira as a special guest of the Asano Clan. Sōko was granted a stipend of 17,000 koku of rice by Nagaakira in the western Hiroshima Prefecture (originally 10,000 koku). He also received a residency on the grounds of Hiroshima Castle and there constructed a shoin reception hall and his tea hermitage called 'Wafūdō' (和風堂). This continued as the official residence of the Ueda Clan until the samurai class were stripped of their feudal residencies in the Meiji Restoration.

The Ueda Clan left their home of 250 years at Hiroshima Castle in 1871 (4th year of the Meiji Era). The Ueda Clan originally relocated to their secondary residence (shimoyashiki 下屋敷) and then settled in the Furue (古江) district of Hiroshima in the early years of the Shōwa Era (1926–1989). Wafūdō was reconstructed in the 5th year of Shōwa (1982) with outer and inner tea gardens (uchiroji 内露地, sotoroji 外露地) and the sukiya tea house Enshō (遠鐘) based on the Wafūdō built by Sōko on the grounds of Hiroshima Castle. Then some years later in the 20th year of Heisei (2008), the reconstruction of the shoin reception hall (書院屋敷), crossing bridge (廊橋) between the shoin and Wafūdō, a kusari-no-ma (鎖之間 formal hanging kettle tearoom) and tsugi-no-ma (次之間 adjoining reception room) in Wafūdō were also recreated as faithful as possible to Sōko's Hiroshima Castle Wafūdō.

With this work, the residence of the Ueda Clan was recreated at the current home of the Ueda Tradition 137 years after the loss of Hiroshima Castle in the Meiji Restoration. Central Hiroshima city was devastated in the atomic bombing of 1945. It is therefore thanks to the current location of the Ueda Clan in Furue in the western district of Hiroshima city that the Clan's estate (historical art works and literature) survived the catastrophe. With the records and literature of the Clan unscathed, the recreation of the original Ueda Clan residence was made possible. Sōko's stone purifying basins (手水鉢), garden lanterns (燈籠) and garden stones (役石) were handed down through the generations of the Ueda Clan. This stonework features in the current gardens of Wafūdō and thus connects the current Wafūdō with that of antiquity.

== Genealogy of the Ueda Sōko Ryū ==
The Ueda Family takes its name from the city of Ueda in Shinano (modern day Nagano Prefecture). The Ueda chose this name after descending from the Ogasawara Clan. The Ogasawara Clan was a Japanese samurai clan descended from the Seiwa Genji. The lineage from the Seiwa Genji runs: Seiwa Genji, ancestors of Minamoto no Yoshimitsu (aka Shinra Saburō Yoshimitsu), Takeda Clan, Ogasawara, Ueda. Ueda Sōko's grandfather Shigeshi and father Shigemoto both served Niwa Nagahide and achieved military fame during the unsettled times of the Genki (1570–1573) and Tenshō (1573–1592) Eras.

In 1619 (Year 5 of the Genwa Era) Ueda Sōko came to Hiroshima serving Asano Nagaakira. At this time Sōko had two sons, the eldest Shigehide and his second son Shigemasa. Soon after settling in Hiroshima, Sōko's eldest son Shigehide was called to reside in Edo Castle as a type of hostage to the Tokugawa Shogunate. Sōko was a hatamoto (a samurai in the direct service of the Tokugawa shogunate of feudal Japan) with 5 thousand koku of land. In 1632 (9th year of the Kanei Era), with his eldest son still a hostage in Edo Castle, Sōko's successor became his second son Shigemasa. Shigemasa's descendants retained a fief of 17 thousand koku of land and served as Chief Retainer for the Hiroshima Domain. The Meiji Restoration occurred during twelfth generation Ueda Yasuatsu's (Ueda Jyōō) time. The current retainer of the Ueda Family, Ueda Sōkei, is the 16th generation following Ueda Sōko.

== Abridged Genealogy of the Ueda Clan ==
1. Ueda Mondonokami Shigeyasu (Sōko) 上田主水正重安(宗箇) 1563–1650
2. Ueda Bizennokami Shigemasa 上田備前守重政 1607–1650
3. Ueda Mondonosuke Shigetsugu 上田主水助重次 1638–1689
4. Ueda Mondo Shigenobu (Sawamizu) 上田主水重羽(沢水) 1662–1724
5. Ueda Mondo Yoshiyuki 上田主水義行 1694–1725
6. Ueda Mondo Yoshiyori 上田主水義従 1715–1736
7. Ueda Mondo Yoshinobu 上田主水義敷 1702–1743
8. Ueda Minbu Yoshitaka 上田民部義珍 ?-1755
9. Ueda Mondo Yasutora 上田主水安虎 ?-1802
10. Ueda Mondo Yasutsugu 上田主水安世(慎斎) 1777–1820
11. Ueda Mondo Yasutoki (Shōtō) 上田主水安節(松涛) 1807–1856
12. Ueda Mondo Yasuatsu (Jyōō) 上田主水安敦(譲翁) 1820–1888
13. Ueda Shōgoi Danshaku Yasukyo 上田正五位男爵 安靖 1849–1907
14. Ueda Shōsani Danshaku Muneo (Sōō) 上田正三位男爵 宗雄(宗翁) 1883–1961
15. Ueda Shōgoi Motoshige (Sōgen) 上田正五位元重(宗源)?-1994
16. Ueda Sōkei 上田宗冏 1945-

== Ueda Clan of Edo ==
1. Ueda Tonomonosuke Shigehide 上田主殿助重秀
2. Ueda Suo no Kami Shigenori 上田周防守重則
3. Ueda Suo no Kami Yoshichika 上田周防守義隣
4. Ueda Koto no Kami Norimasa 上田能登守義當
5. Ueda Nagato no Kami Yoshiatsu 上田長門守義篤
6. Ueda Yoshishige 上田義茂

== Successive Generations of the Ueda Clan ==
=== 1st Generation: Ueda Mondonokami Shigeyasu 上田主水正重安 ===
The Founder of the Ueda Clan of Hiroshima. Founder of the Ueda Sōko Tradition of Chanoyu. His personal name was Sōko 宗箇 and his Buddhist name was Chikuin 竹隠. He received his Buddhist name from Shunoku Sōen (春屋宗園). Died 1 May, 3rd year of Keian Era (1650 / 慶安3) aged 88. Posthumous Buddhist name: 〔清涼院前上林諸大夫竹隠宗箇大居士〕

=== 2nd Generation: Ueda Bizennokami Shigemasa 上田備前守重政 ===
Born in 12th year of Keichō Era (1607 / 慶長12) in the Wakayama Castle town of the Kishu Domain (紀州和歌山城下). Second son of Ueda Sōko. As his older brother Tonomonosuke Shigehide (主殿助重秀) was made to serve as a vassal to the Tokugawa Shogun in Edo, Shigehide became the 2nd generation head of the Ueda Clan of Hiroshima. He served the Tokugawa in the Amakusa no Ran (Shimabara Rebellion 天草の乱). He learned chanoyu directly from his father and many of his handmade flower vases (hana-ire), tea scoops (chashaku) and other tea equipage have been kept in the Ueda estate to the present day. Died 10 April, 3rd year of Keian Era (1650 / 慶安3) aged 44. Posthumous Buddhist name: 〔天桂院前備州刺史玉岩玄光大居士〕

=== 3rd Generation: Ueda Mondonosuke Shigetsugu 上田主水助重次 ===
Shigemasa's son. His childhood name was Satarō (佐太郎) the same as for Ueda Sōko. In the 3rd year of Keian Era (1650 / 慶安3) he inherited the family estate at the age of 20 when both his father Shigemasa, then grandfather Sōko died in succession. He lived a very busy life back and forth to Edo and Kyoto on official duties. Died 5 June, 2nd year of Genroku Era (1689 / 元禄2) aged 60. Posthumous Buddhist name: 〔永泰院覚了宗源大居士〕

=== 4th Generation: Ueda Mondo Shigenobu 上田主水重羽 ===
Shigetsugu's son. He was originally known by the name of Shigeyuki (重之), then Shigenori (重矩) and later took the name Shigenobu (重羽). Second generation Nomura Enzai (野村家二代円斎) (who trained under and received the highest rank of qualification from Sōko) and first generation Nakamura Chigen (中村家初代知元) served as his Grand Retainers. Shigenobu had a profound knowledge of chanoyu and he made many tea equipages including flower vases, tea scoops, etc. He was especially skilled in ceramics and made many tea bowls and other classic pieces favoured by the daimyō chanoyu connoisseurs of the Genroku era. For example, the lion sculpture and wide, diamond-shaped fresh water container still in use by the Ueda Tradition today. He later took the name Sawamizu (沢水) and had a close friendship with the Domain's Chief Confucian Scholar Yamana Ungan Yoshikata (儒臣山名雲巌義方). Died 8 April, 9th year of Kyōhō Era (1724 / 享保9) aged 63. Posthumous Buddhist name: 〔大機院一関良超大居士〕

=== 5th Generation: Ueda Mondo Yoshiyuki 上田主水義行 ===
Childhood name: Neyoshi (禰吉). Eighth son of 6th Generation Asano Nagatsuna (浅野家六代綱長の八男). As Shigenobu's son, Shigemoto, died, Yoshiyuki was adopted into the Ueda Clan in the 6th year of the Hōei Era (1709 / 宝永6). He served under the titles Kazue (主計) and Motobashi (元喬), then in the 2nd year of the Kyōhō Era (1717 / 享保2) changed to Bizen Shigeyuki (備前重行), and finally as Yoshiyuki (義行). In June, 9th year of Kyōhō (1724 / 享保9), he succeeded Shigenobu and in January of the next year he was awarded the rank Mondo (主水). He died on 14 December the same year. Posthumous Buddhist name: 〔不白院孤山了雪大居士〕

=== 6th Generation: Ueda Mondo Yoshiyori 上田主水義従 ===
Illegitimate child of Shigenobu born after Fifth Generation Yoshiyuki was adopted into the Ueda Clan. First known as Yasuhito (要人). He became the heir of Yoshiyuki under higher order and in February of the 11th year of the Kyōhō Era (1726 / 享保11) he inherited the Ueda estate. He came of age (genpuku 元服) in the 16th year of Kyōhō (1731 / 享保16) and took the title of Mondo (主水). Yoshiyori restored the 100-year-old Hiroshima Wafūdo and had regular acquaintance with Gion Nankai (祗園南海), the Confucian Scholar of the Kishū Tokugawa Clan. Mondo Yoshinori died on 14 October, first year of Genbun (1736 / 元文元) at the age of 22. Posthumous Buddhist name: 〔乾澤院特頴道達大居士〕

=== 7th Generation: Ueda Mondo Yoshinobu 上田主水義敷 ===
Asano Tsunanaga's (浅野綱長) 11th son and brother of Fifth Generation Yoshiyuki. Childhood names: Tominojyō (富之丞) and Noritaka (謙隆). Later awarded the title Gyōbu (刑部) and then Shume (主馬). Became the adopted child of Ueda Yoshiyori in the first year of the Genbun Era (1736 / 元文元) and succeeded Yoshiyori in December of the same year. Upon inheriting the Ueda estate his name changed to Yoshinobu (義敷). Died on 25 October, second year of Hōreki (1752 / 宝暦2) at the age of 52. Posthumous Buddhist name: 〔大禪院殿関峰了三大居士〕

=== 8th Generation: Ueda Minbu Yoshitaka 上田民部義珍 ===
Third son of Shogunal vassal Ueda Koto no Kami Norimasa (上田能登守義當) of the Ueda Clan of Edo. First known as Gontarō (権太郎). Adopted into the Ueda Clan of Hiroshima in the second year of Hōreki (1752 / 宝暦2). In December of the same year he inherited the Ueda estate. On 19 August in the 5th year of Hōreki (1755 / 宝暦5), he suffered an early death at 19. Posthumous Buddhist name: 〔曹源院殿一滔滴水大居士〕

=== 9th Generation: Ueda Mondo Yasutora 上田主水安虎 ===
Youngest child of Matsudaira Kunai Shōsuke Nagakata (松平宮内少輔長賢) of the Asano Clan's Aoyama Naisho Branch (浅野青山内証分家). First called Yujurō (友十郎), in December of the 5th year of Hōreki (1755 / 宝暦5) he was adopted into the Ueda Clan as the successor of Yoshitaka and assumed the title Mondo (主水). During the Hōreki years Yasutora set a precedent for the Domain Schools (Hankō 藩校) and established an education forum within the formal residence of the Ueda Clan on the grounds of Hiroshima Castle to further the education of vassals. A skilled painter, such works as his 'Study of a Hawk' remain in the Ueda estate. Died 25 May, second year of Kyōwa (1802 / 享和2) age 59. Posthumous Buddhist name: 〔大雲院殿龍巖霊泉大居士〕

=== 10th Generation: Ueda Mondo Yasutsugu 上田主水安世 ===
Second son Motouma (求馬) of the Shogunal Retainer Nakane Clan (幕臣中根家), formerly of Asano Clan's Aoyama Naisho Branch. First called Ikusaburō (幾三郎), at the age of 12 he became 9th Generation Yasutora's adopted son. He travelled to Edo in the 8th year of the Tenmei Era (1788 / 天明8) and after his returned to Hiroshima assumed the roles Bizen (備前), Shima (志摩) and then Mondo (主水). He took great interest in literature like Yasutora before him. He would always gather his vassals to recite poetry on auspicious days to celebrate the transient beauty of the seasons. His favoured flower vases, tea scoops and single-line calligraphy scrolls remain in the Ueda estate. Died 4 November on in the third year of the Bunsei Era (1820 / 文政3) aged 44. Posthumous Buddhist name: 〔大謙院殿韜光良温大居士〕

=== 11th Generation: Ueda Mondo Yasutoki 上田主水安節 ===
First called Yasusada (安定). Younger brother of Asano Kazue (浅野主計). After being adopted in to the Ueda Clan, in the 4th year of the Bunsei Era (1821 / 文政4) he succeed the estate and became the 11th generation lord. Like Yasutsugu, he continued frequent acquaintance with the three Rai brothers: Shunsui, Shunpu and Kyōhei (頼三兄弟、春水・春風・杏坪). Yasutoki invited Chiho Taira (千穂平) from Seto to collaborate with him in a surge of o-niwa-yaki (庭焼) production (o-niwa-yaki are ceramics for tea made on the inside of castle grounds by samurai tea masters). He took the Buddhist name of Shōtō (松涛), possessed a deep knowledge of chanoyu, and left numerous masterpieces of tea equipages including tea scoops and o-niwa-yaki black raku tea bowls. He was also a famous calligrapher. Died at age 50 on 1 July, third year of the Ansei Era (1856 / 安政3). Posthumous Buddhist name: 〔有恪院殿先令終大居士〕

=== 12th Generation: Ueda Mondo Yasuatsu 上田主水安敦 ===
Son of 10th generation Yatsutsugu and adopted son of 11th generation Yasutoki. Childhood name Junnosuke (順之助), then Shimanobu (志馬允) and later Umanoshin (馬之進) before taking the title and name Naiki (内記). He served as the Chief Retainer of Hiroshima Domain (国老) in the chaos of the end of the Edo bakufu. He led troops from the Hiroshima Domain in the Chōshū expeditions (征長戦 war between shogunal troops and the Chōshū Domain) performed official duties in Kyoto and earned distinguished service in affairs of state. Following the Meiji Restoration he had the foresight to hand the territory of the Ueda Clan back to Hiroshima Domain prior to the reclamation of the Emperor. He took the name Shigemi (重美), then Chigura (千庫) before taking his tonsure and entering the Buddhist priesthood in the third year of Meiji (1870 明治3). He then took the name Sansuigen Jōō (山水軒・譲翁), retired from official duties and dedicated his life to chanoyu and waka poetry. He titled his collection of tea records 'Whimsical Record of Aesthetic Play' (雅遊謾録 Miyabi-asobi Manroku) and received the daisu transmission (highest level teaching) from Grand Retainer Nakamura Taishin (中村泰心) at an early age. He put great passion and zeal into composing books on chanoyu and organising the tea equipage of the Ueda estate together with his Grand Retainers. Jōō is hailed as the father of the renaissance of the Ueda Tradition. He later took the further names Shunoku Shōin (春舎松陰) and Rantei (蘭亭), was especially renowned for his skill in waka poetry, well-versed in Japanese and Chinese literature and was revered as a leader. Died at age 69 on 26 December, 20th year of the Meiji Era (1888). The Ueda Clan changed its official affiliation to Shinto in Yasuatsu's time and are therefore no posthumous buddhist names from this generation on.

=== 13th Generation: Ueda Yasukyo 上田安靖 ===
Twelfth generation Yasuatsu did not have children and so a son of 11th generation Yasutoki named Kinosuke (亀之助) succeeded Yasuatsu. He later received the title Tenzen (典膳) and changed his name to Kamejirō (亀次郎). In the 19th year of the Meiji Era (1886) he became the chief priest of Nigitsu Shrine (饒津神社), where the ancestry of the Asano Clan is enshrined. He devoted himself to the study of the Ōtsubo School of equestrian (大坪流馬術), Heki School of archery (日置流射), Chinese classic literature and Western learning. Due to ancestral merits he became Senior Fifth Rank Baron (Shōgoi Danshaku 正五位男爵). Died at age 59 on 15 February, 40th year of the Meiji Era (1907).

=== 14th Generation: Ueda Muneo 上田宗雄 ===
Yasukyo's oldest son. Took the name Ankantei Sōō (安閑亭宗翁). He was a skilled calligrapher and also studied the Nanga Southern School of Chinese painting under Inada Motokuni (稲田素邦). He composed great works in calligraphy, nanga painting, works of bamboo flower vases and tea scoops (chashaku). Third Rank Baron (Shōsani Danshaku 正三位男爵). Chief priest of Nigitsu Shrine. Died at age 78 on 18 November, third year of the Shōwa Era (1961 / 昭和3).

=== 15th Generation: Ueda Sōgen 上田宗源 ===
Muneo's oldest son. Sansuiken Sōgen. Original name Motoshige (元重). Restored Wafūdō and created the Ueda Ryū Wafūdō Foundation (財団法人上田流和風堂) in the 54th year of the Shōwa Era (1979 / 昭和54). Chief priest of Nigitsu Shrine and chief priest of Asakta Shrine (淺方社) where the successive generations of the Ueda Clan are enshrined. Died at age 82 on 12 June, 6th year of the Heisei Era (1994 / 平成6).

=== 16th Generation: Ueda Sōkei 上田宗冏 ===
Grandchild of Muneo. Current head of the Ueda Clan. First titled Wafūdō Sōshi (和風堂宗嗣) and later received the buddhist name Sōkei (宗冏). Original name Jyunji (潤二). Marked the 350th anniversary of the death of Ueda Sōko with exhibitions in Osaka, Hiroshima and Tokyo. Completed a reconstruction of the original formal residence of the Ueda Clan that existed on the grounds of Hiroshima Castle. The reconstruction was made on the current grounds of the Ueda Tradition, 137 years after the loss of Hiroshima Castle in the Meiji Restoration.

== Grand Retainers of the Chanoyu of the Ueda Clan 上田家茶事預り師範 ==
The transmission of the style of chanoyu particular to the Ueda Clan is due to a special system devised by Ueda Sōko. Ueda Sōko founded a unique tradition of chanoyu alongside his duties as the Chief Retainer of the Domain of Hiroshima and Shō-Daimyō (小大名) of a fief of 17,000 koku of rice. Sōko and his descendants were dedicated to the practice of chanoyu and continued Sōko's legacy for generations. But Sōko and his successors did not teach people chanoyu directly. Instead, the teaching of the School was invested in two families. In 1632 (9th year of the Kanei Era 寛永九), a man by the name of Nomura Yahee no Jyō Moriyasu 野村彌兵衛尉盛安 of Suō Yanai (周防柳井 modern day Shimane Prefecture) relocated to Hiroshima to seek instruction in chanoyu from Ueda Sōko. Moriyasu served Sōko by governing a stipend of land worth 100 koku of rice. He later took his tonsure and the Buddhist name of Kyūmu (休夢) and became the first Grand Retainer of Ueda Sōko's chanoyu.

One of first generation Nomura Kyūmu's students of chanoyu was Nakamura Masachika-Chigen (中村雅親・知元). He also served Sōko by governing a stipend of land worth 100 koku of rice. After Kyūmu's death, Chigen succeeded Kyūmu, becoming the first generation of the Nakamura family to hold the title of Grand Retainer of the chanoyu of the Ueda clan. Ueda Sōko therefore invested the teaching of his style of chanoyu in two families: the Nomura and Nakamura. These two families were employed by the Ueda clan to transmit the Ueda tradition of chanoyu through the generations. It is thanks to the Grand Retainers of the Nomura and Nakamura families that the Ueda tradition has been faithfully transmitted, unbroken, from Ueda Sōko to the present day. After the death of 15th generation Nakamura Kaidō (中村快堂) in 1906 (39th year of the Meiji Era), both the Nakamura and Nomura families were without successors. The role of 16th generation Grand Retainer was therefore awarded to their leading disciple Mukai Chikkadō (向井竹蝸堂). Kakei Seidō (加計静堂) then succeeded Chikkadō to serve as the 17th generation Grand Retainer before his death in 1955 (30th year of the Shōwa Era). Seidō was the last of the Grand Retainers of Ueda Sōko's chanoyu. With his death, the system of delegating the transmission of the Ueda tradition of chanoyu came to an end.

=== First Generation Nomura Kyūmu 野村休夢 ===
Originally named Nomura Moriyasu (野村盛安), took the title and name Yahee no Jyō (彌兵衛尉) and later the Buddhist name of Kyūmu (休夢). Originally from Suō Yanai (周防柳井 modern day Yamaguchi Prefecture). In the 9th year of the Kanei Era (1632 / 寛永9) he relocated to Hiroshima to learn chanoyu from Sōko and became the Grand Retainer of the Ueda Clan's style of chanoyu along with serving Sōko by governing a stipend of land worth 100 koku of rice. Kyūmu is first generation Nomura Clan Grand Retainer of Ueda Sōko's chanoyu (上田家茶事預り野村家初代). Died on 7 February, second year of the Jyōō Era (1653 / 承応2).

=== First Generation Nakamura Chigen 中村知元 ===
Originally named Nakamura Masachika (中村雅親) and later took the name Chigen (知元). A disciple of Kyūmu. The first generation Nakamura Clan Grand Retainer of Ueda Sōko's chanoyu (上田家茶事預り中村家初代). He also served the Ueda Clan by governing a stipend of land worth 100 koku of rice. The Nakamura and Nomura families were employed by the Ueda clan to transmit the Ueda tradition of chanoyu through the generations until the Meiji Era. It is thanks to the Grand Retainers of the Nomura and Nakamura families that the Ueda tradition has been faithfully transmitted, unbroken, from Ueda Sōko to the present day. Chigen died on 26 June, 18th year of the Kyōhō Era (1733 / 享保18).

=== Second Generation Nomura Ensai 野村円斎 ===
Nomura Yasumune (野村安宗). Kyūmu's oldest son, named Yashichi (彌七). From the age of nine served as Sōko's attendant and later received kaiden (皆伝 all set qualifications of the School) from him. The author of The Sōko Diaries (宗箇様御聞書 Sōko-sama Go-kikigaki Sho). Died on the last day of April in the 9th year of the Genroku Era (1696 / 元禄9).

=== Second Generation Nakamura Genga 中村元賀 ===
Nakamura Tadayoshi (中村忠美), Chigen's fourth son. Served as the Grand Retainer of Chanoyu for the Ueda Clan and by governing a stipend of land worth 100 koku of rice. Later took the name Chigen (元賀).

=== Third Generation Nomura Sokyū 野村祖休 ===
Nomura Toshinobu (野村敏之). Ensai's second son. Originally called Ryōzo (良三) and later took the name Sokyū (祖休). Died on 13 February in the 5th year of the Enkyō Era (1748 / 延享5).

=== Third Generation Nakamura Taikyū 中村泰休 ===
Nakamura Nobusumi. Known by the names Enkai, Taikyū and Tenchikan Chisui.

=== Fourth Generation Nomura Tanshin 野村旦心 ===
Nomura Sadae (中村延清). Sokyū's son. Originally known as Hide-etsu (秀悦) and later as Tanshin (旦心). Died on 17 November in the 9th year of the Anei Era (1780 / 安永9).

=== Fifth Generation Nomura Kyūmu 野村休夢 ===
Nomura Kiyomasa (野村清明). Son of Tanshin (旦心). Originally known as Fukyūsai (不朽斎) and took the name Kyūmu (休夢) after retirement from official duties. Died on 27 December in the 5th year of the Bunka Era (1808 / 文化5).

=== Fourth Generation Nakamura Chisai 中村知斎 ===
Nakamura Atsuyoshi (中村篤美). Also known as Chisai (知斎) and Chikkansai Zuifū (竹閑斎隨風).

=== Sixth Generation Nomura Sokyū 野村祖休 ===
Nomura Yukiharu (野村幸治). Son of fifth generation Nomura Kyūmu. Later took the name Sokyū (祖休). One of the most talented and renowned chanoyu practitioners of his time. To accord with the notable increase of people practicing chanoyu during his time, along with 6th generation Nakamura Taishin (中村泰心) and 7th generation Nomura Yokyū (野村餘休), Sokyū devised a modern structure for the transmission of teachings of chanoyu. Died on 20 September in the 10th year of Tenpō (1839 / 天保10).

=== Fifth Generation Nakamura Genga 中村元賀 ===
Nakamura Kazumasa (中村一正). Later took the name Genga (元賀).

=== Seventh Generation Nomura Yokyū 野村餘休 ===
Nomura Teiko (野村貞固). Son of Sokyū. Took the name Yokyū (餘休). Renowned as one of the 'Three Geniuses of Hiroshima' (広島三才) together with Rai Sanyō (頼山陽) and Honinbō Shūsaku (本因坊秀策). In his later years he travelled to Osaka and his fame in tea circles increased considerably. Died in Osaka on 14 October in the first year of Kaei (1848 / 嘉永元).

=== Sixth Generation Nakamura Taishin 中村泰心 ===
Nakamura Tadakazu (中村忠和). Later called Taihsin (泰心) and Kōrin-an Wasui (香林庵和水). It is known from the notes of disciples that his teaching influence extended to the Kansai area and central Shikoku. Wrote volumes 1 and 2 of the Ueda Tradition of Chanoyu 28 Elements for Practice and Study (御流儀茶事稽古次第目録二十八習乾・坤), showing his adaption to a new era in the transmission of chanoyu.

=== Eighth Generation Nomura Ensai 野村円斎 ===
Nomura Moritaka (野村盛孝). Commonly called Enzō (円蔵). Yokyū's adopted son from the Okumura family. He took the further names Yūkoku-an Shōen (幽谷庵松園), Ensai (円斎) and Kaninoya (蟹廼舎). Fought together his lord Ueda Yasuatsu (上田安敦) in the Chōshū expeditions (征長戦 war between shogunal troops and the Chōshū Domain) and left a war diary from the expedition. Frequently appears in Jōō's (Yasuatsu's) (譲翁(安敦)) collection of tea records 'Whimsical Record of Aesthetic Play'. Died on 15 August, 14th year of the Meiji Era (1881).

=== Seventh Generation Nakamura Kaidō 中村快堂 ===
Nakamura Toyojirō (中村豊次郎). Taishin did not have a male heir and Toyojirō became adopted heir from the Yugawa family (湯川家). Took the name Shōfū-an Kaidō (松風庵快堂). Diligently served the father of the renaissance of the Ueda Tradition, Ueda Jōō (上田譲翁), and appears frequently in Jōō's 'Whimsical Record of Aesthetic Play' together with Nomura Ensai. Started the Karaku Association (暇楽会). His work laid the foundation for the establishment of the Wafūkai (和風会). Conducted scrupulous work organising the equipages in the Ueda estate. Died at age 77 on 8 November in the 39th year of the Meiji Era (1906).

=== Sixteenth Generation Mukai Chikkadō 向井竹蝸堂 ===
Mukai Ritsu (向井律). Nakamura Kaidō's leading disciple. As both the Nomura and Nakamura did not have heirs, Ritsu received orders from the Ueda Clan to succeed them as the next generation Grand Retainer of chanoyu. Took the name Chikkadō (竹蝸堂). Died on 20 December, 13th year of Taishō (1924 / 大正13).

=== Seventeenth Generation Kakei Seidō 加計静堂 ===
Kakei Noboru's son. Took the name Kōkatei Seidō (交花亭静堂). Succeeded Chikkadō in the 13th year of Taishō (1924 / 大正13) to serve as the 17th generation and final Retaining Master. Wrote 'The Chanoyu of the Ueda Tradition' 『茶道上田流』. Died at age 90 on 7 November, 30th year of the Shōwa Era (1955 / 昭和30).
