= Funakoshi Kagenao =

Funakoshi Kagenao 船越景直
- Born: 1540
- Died: 1611
- Other names: Gorōemon
- Known for: Hatamoto to the Edo Shogunate. Tea Master in Oribe's style of warrior tea. Associated tea masters: Furuta Oribe, Asano Yoshinaga, Kobori Enshū, Ueda Sōko

Funakoshi Kagenao 船越景直 (1540-1611) was a Japanese military commander and tea master of the Azuchi-Momoyama (1573-1603) and early Edo Periods (1603-1868) of Japan. In his later years he served as a ‘hatamoto’ samurai in direct service of the Edo Shogunate. He was commonly called ‘Funakoshi Gorōemon’. Kagenao was also a tea master who practised chanoyu under the tutelage of Furuta Oribe. He received ‘full-transmission’ (kaiden) of Oribe's teachings on 12 March 1606. Part of Kagenao's chanoyu legacy is the ‘Funakoshi Kantō’ 船越間道 type of vertical striped fabric. The blue, gold and chestnut pattern is classed as a ‘meibutsu-gire’ (famed fabric) and endures as an example of highly sophisticated taste.

Kagenao's first major title was head of Awaji Shōda Castle, holding it in the service of Atagi Fuyuyasu’s navy. Fuyuyasu served Miyoshi Nagayoshi, a senior vassal of the Hosokawa Clan. After the death of Miyoshi Nagayoshi, Kagenao served Oda Nobunaga, and this affiliation contributed to Kagenao being permitted to rule his inherited territory (honryo-ando) in 1581 when Hashiba Hideyoshi captured Awaji. After the Honnoji Incident (1582), Kagenao participated in the Battle of Shizugatake (1583) and the Battle of Komaki and Nagakute (1584) as a direct vassal of Hideyoshi. He was transferred from Awaji to Harima Akashi Domain, where he received a fief of 4,000 koku. Thereafter, Kagenao fought for Hideyoshi in the Siege of Odawara (1590) and the Japanese Invasions of Korea (1592-98).

After Hideyoshi's death, Kagenao was reinstated by Tokugawa Ieyasu and awarded fiefs in Settsu, and then Kawachi Provinces at the request of Ieyasu. Needless to say, Kagenao sided with Ieyasu's East Army in the Battle of Sekigahara. Due to his military achievements in the battle, Kagenao was awarded a further 1,500 koku to his fief and listed as a hatamoto of the Edo Shogunate. Kagenao died in 1611 at the age of 72.
