= Shunoku Sōen =

14th century Rinzai Zen monk

Shunoku Sōen 春屋宗園 Kokushi 国師
- Born: 1529
- Died: 1611 (aged 81–82)
- Other names: Zen Master Rōgen Tenshin (Rōgen Tenshin Zenji 朗源天真禅師), National Teacher Taihō Enkan (Taihō Enkan Kokushi 大宝円鑑国師)
- Known for: 111th Head Priest of Daitoku-ji temple. Zen teacher to numerous tea masters. Associated tea masters: Sen no Rikyū, Furuta Oribe, Ueda Sōko, Kobori Enshū, Sen Dōan, Sen Sōtan, Yabunouchi Jōchi, Imai Sōkyū

Shunoku Sōen (pronounced with a hard 'n': "Shun'oku") (春屋宗園) (1529 - 1611) was a Rinzai Zen monk of the Azuchi-Momoyama and early Edo periods and the 111th Head Priest of Daitoku-ji temple. He received the title Zen Master Rōgen Tenshin (Rōgen Tenshin Zenji 朗源天真禅師) from Emperor Ōgimachi in 1586 and the highest acclaim of National Teacher Taihō Enkan (Taihō Enkan Kokushi 大宝円鑑国師) from Emperor Go-Yōzei (1571-1617) in 1600. Sōen was born in Yamashiro Province and became a monk at an early age. He first trained under Rosetsu Yōha (dates unknown) at Kennin-ji, and spent a period as a student at the Ashikaga Gakkō before becoming a student of Kōin Sōken at Daitoku-ji. After Sōken's death, Sōen completed his training under Shōrei Sōkin (1505-1584) of Daisen-in and the 107th Head Priest of Daitoku-ji. Sōen became the 111th Head Priest of Daitoku-ji in 1569 (2nd year of the Eiroko Era).

== Time at Nanshū-ji, Sakai ==
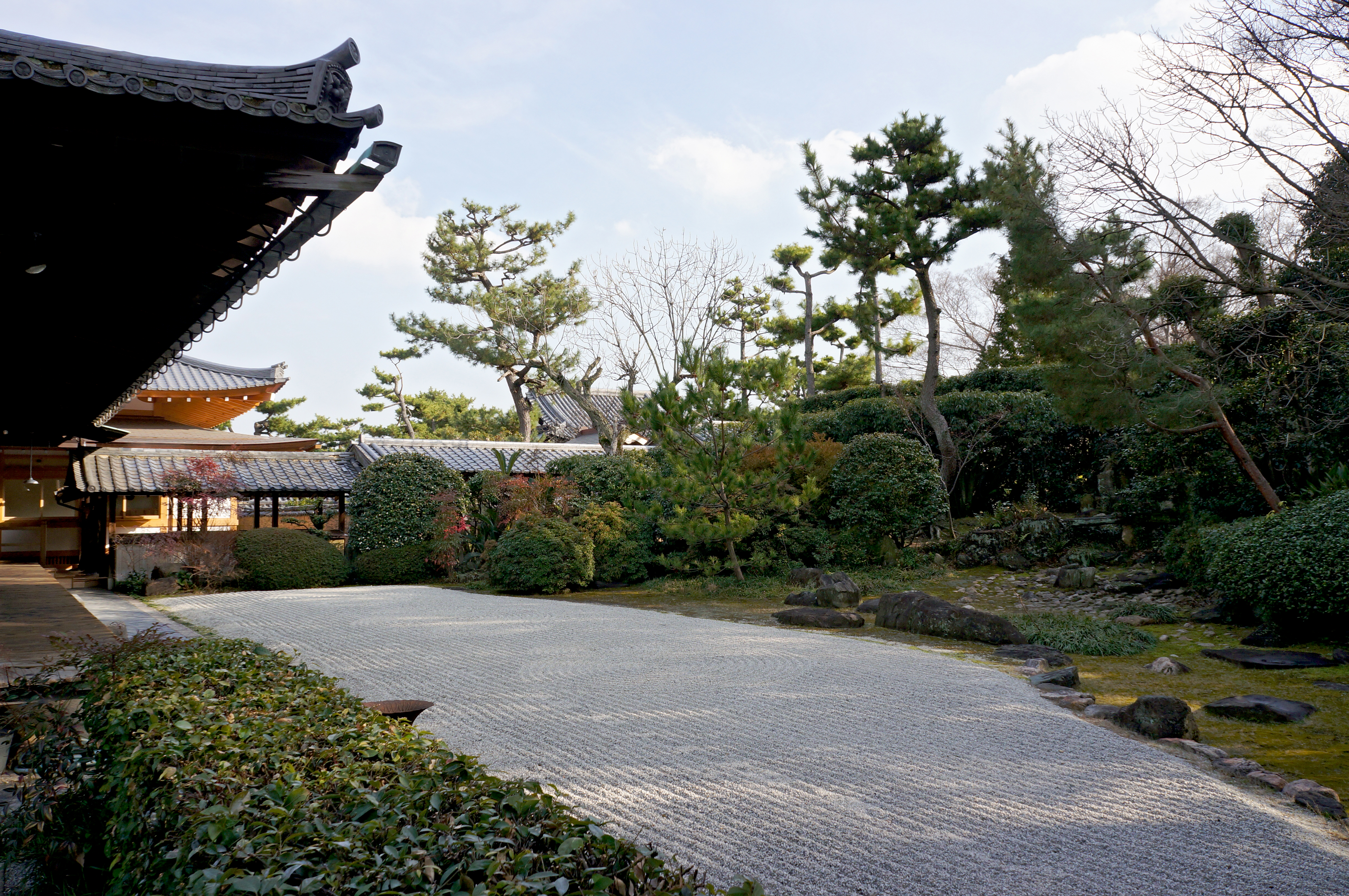
Karesansui garden of Nanshū-ji in Sakai, Osaka prefecture. Furuta Oribe was involved in its design.

Sōen spent some years in Sakai at the Yōshun-an sub-temple of Nanshū-ji after assuming the position of 111th Head Priest, a tradition followed by such masters as Ikkyū Sōjun after becoming Head Priest of Daitoku-ji. Takeno Jōō and Sen Rikyū trained in Zen at Nanshū-ji and the karesansui (dry landscape) garden on the temple grounds was designed by Furuta Oribe. In 1580, Sōen founded Daitsū-an under the patronage of wealthy Sakai merchant and legendary tea master Tsuda Sōgyū. Sōen received great adoration from the people of Sakai and in 1583 he became the 3rd Head Priest of Nanshū-ji.

== Return to Daitoku-ji and Opening of Sangen-in ==
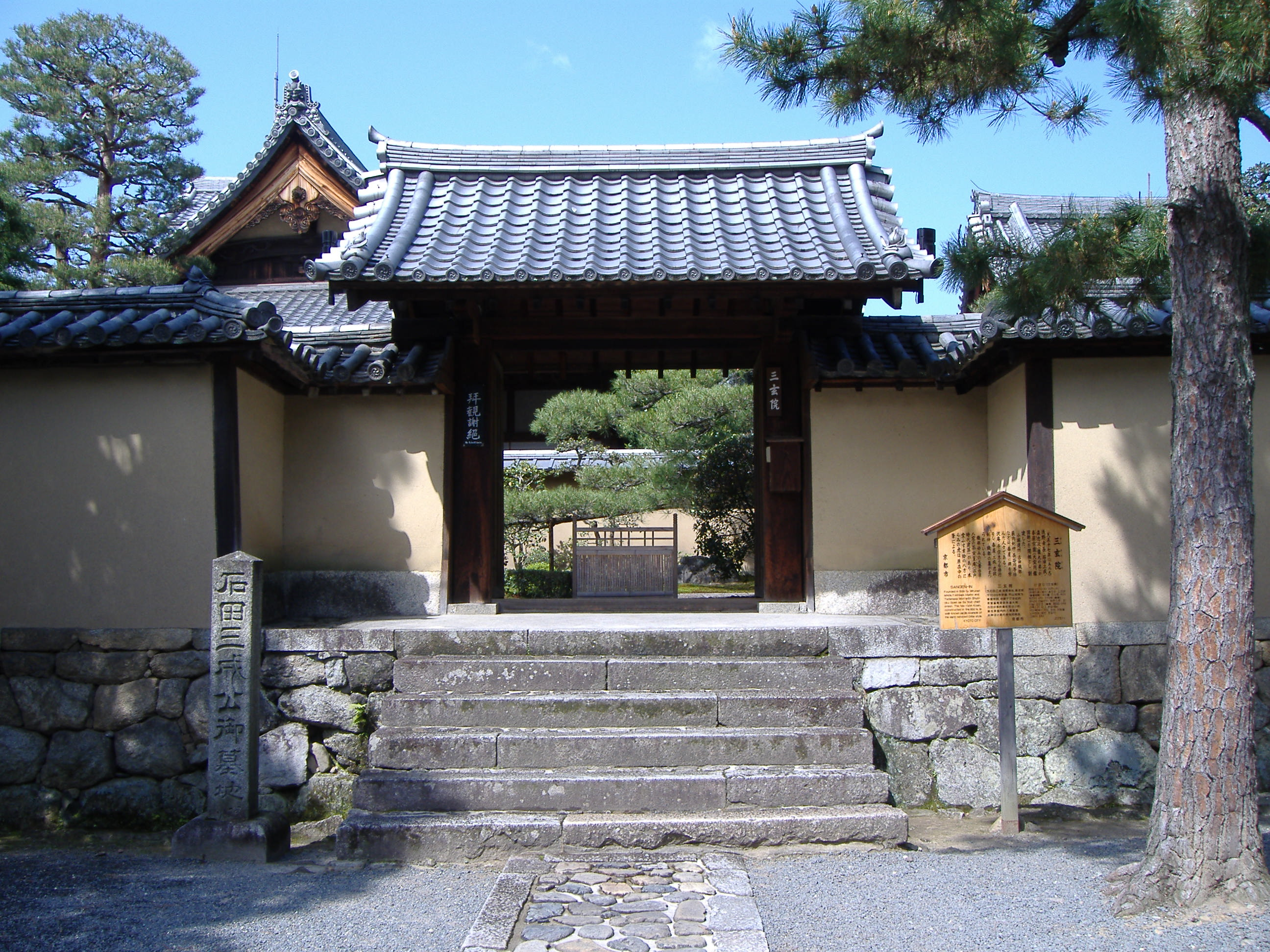
Sangen-in, Daitoku-ji, Kyōto

Sōen returned to Kyōto in 1589 and resided at the Daisen-in and Jukō-in sub-temples of Daitoku-ji before founding a new sub-temple Sangen-in under the patronage of Ishida Mitsunari and Asano Nagamasa. While at Sangen-in, Sōen founded Zuigaku-ji Temple in Omi Province, again sponsored by Mitsunari, and Yakusen-ji under the patronage of tea master and Sakai merchant Yamaoka Sōmu (?-1595).

== Connection with the Japanese Tea Ceremony ==
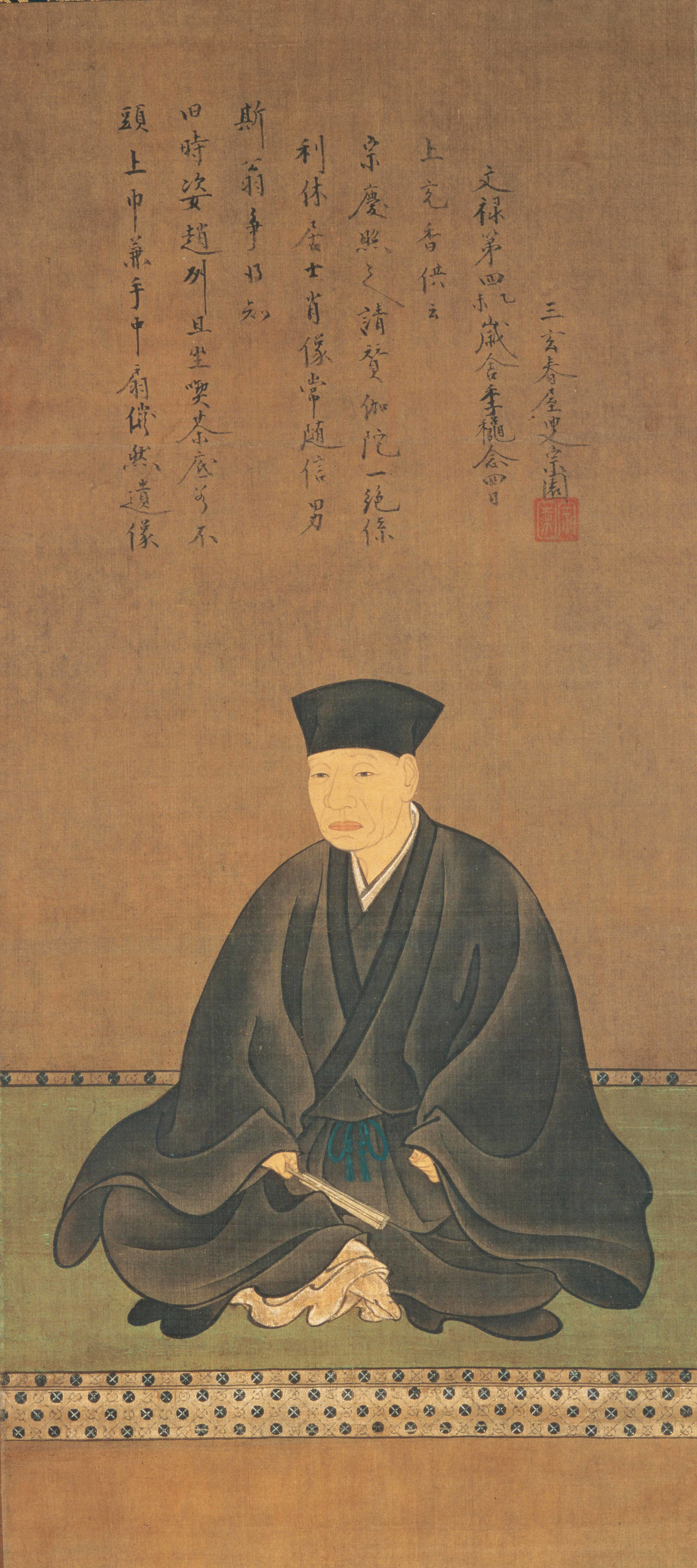
Portrait of Sen Rikyū by Hasegawa Tōhaku with a calligraphy inscription by Shunoku Sōen.

Shunoku Sōen is famous for his deep connection with the Way of Tea. He held many tea wares now in the Sangen-in estate. In the collection of Sōen's poetry and Buddhist verses (gatha) entitled ‘Ichimoku Kō’ 一黙稿, he writes about the beauty of some of the most famous art objects in chanoyu history including the Chigusa, Miroku and Akebono tea jars and the Seitaka Katatsuki, and Enza Katatsuki tea caddies. The tea masters that studied Zen under him are a veritable who's who of chanoyu: Sōen bestowed Buddhist training names to Furuta Oribe (Kinpo 金甫), Ueda Sōko (Chikuin 竹隠), Kobori Enshū (Daiyū 大有), Sen Dōan (Min'ō 眠翁), Sen Sōtan, (Genshuku 元叔) and Yabunouchi Jōchi (Kenchū 剣中). Sōen was also closely associated with Imai Sōkyū and Sen Rikyū. In 1589, Sōen was the officiating priest for the opening ceremony of the Sanmon gate, reconstructed from funds donated by Rikyū. Three days after the opening, Sōen again officiated for the 50th anniversary memorial for Rikyū's father at the Sanmon gate.After the completion of the Sanmon gate (金毛閣), in the offering written by Shunoku Sōen at the request of Rikyū, thousands of households opent their door at once said this sentence, which angered Hideyoshi then became a turning point of the relationship between Rikyū and Hideyoshi. Finally Hideyoshi ordered him to commit ritual suicide. Rikyū's grandson, Sen Sōtan, was sent to live at Sangen-in under the supervision of Shunoku Sōen at the age of ten through the wish of Rikyū. The calligraphy inscription of Rikyū's famous portrait by Hasegawa Tōhaku was written by Sōen at the request of Sen Dōan.

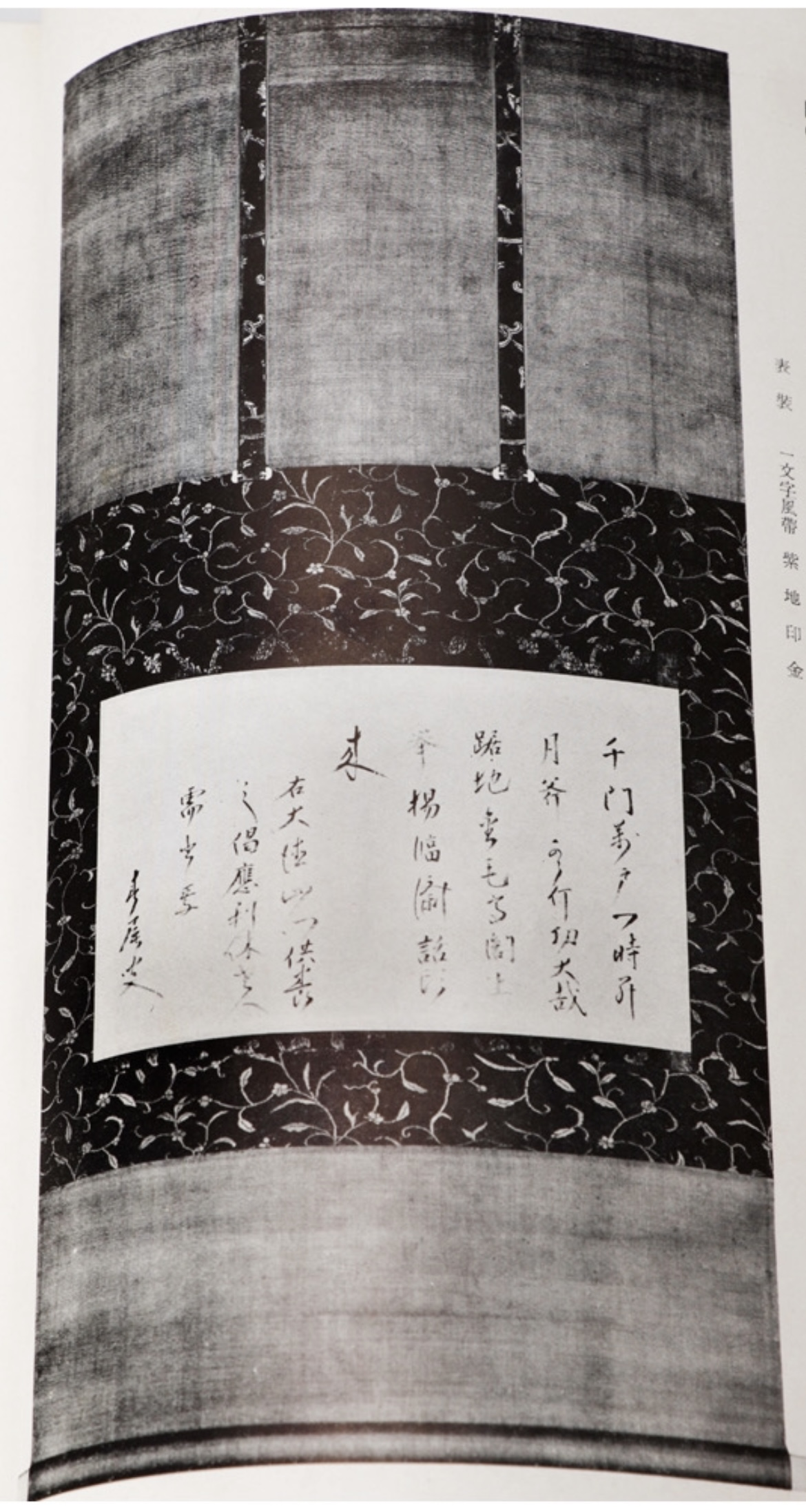

Sōen died in 1611 at the age of 83. His grave is at Sangen-in.

As a spiritual leader, he did not create works of art for commercial purposes, so it is not appropriate to talk about his "most expensive work."

However, Shun'oku Sogen is renowned for his calligraphy and is considered one of the greatest Zen calligraphers in Japan's history. Some of his calligraphy works are highly valued and considered national treasures, but they are not sold in the market. Instead, they are preserved and exhibited in museums and temples for their historical and cultural significance.

Shun'oku Sogen is known for his contributions to the development and transmission of the tea ceremony in Japan, particularly the incorporation of Zen principles into the ceremony. One of his famous offerings is the "Jukoan Tea Ceremony," which emphasizes the Zen concept of "ichi-go ichi-e," meaning "one time, one meeting." This concept emphasizes the importance of being fully present in the moment and cherishing each encounter as a once-in-a-lifetime experience. The Jukoan Tea Ceremony is still practiced today and is considered a valuable contribution to Japanese tea culture.
