= Honpō-ji =

Honpō-ji (本法寺) is the name of several Buddhist temples in Japan:

- Honpō-ji (Nakajima) in Nakajima, Fukushima
- Honpō-ji (Sumida) in Sumida, Tokyo
- Honpō-ji (Bunkyō) in Bunkyō, Tokyo
- Honpō-ji (Taitō) in Taitō, Tokyo
- Honpō-ji (Toyama) in Toyama, Toyama
- Honpō-ji (Kyoto) in Kyoto, Kyoto
