= Fushimi bugyō =

Officials of the Tokugawa shogunate in Edo-period Japan

Fushimi bugyō (伏見奉行) were officials of the Tokugawa shogunate in Edo-period Japan. Appointments to this prominent office were usually fudai daimyō, but this was amongst the senior administrative posts open to those who were not daimyō. Conventional interpretations have construed these Japanese titles as "commissioner", "overseer", or "governor".

This particular bakufu title identifies an official responsible for administration of the area near Fushimi, including the Kyoto barriers and the location of Fushimi Castle, which was dismantled in 1623.

This shogunate position was created in 1620.

== Shogunal city ==
During this period, Fushimi ranked with the largest urban centers, some of which were designated as a "shogunal city". The number of such cities rose from three to eleven under Tokugawa administration. Fushimi had its own bugyō because it was an important communication nexus on the north-south route.

== List of Fushimi bugyō ==
- Kobori Masakazu, also known as Kobori Enshu.

== See also ==
- Bugyō
