= Hon'ami Kōetsu =

Japanese craftsman

Hon'ami Kōetsu 本阿弥 光悦
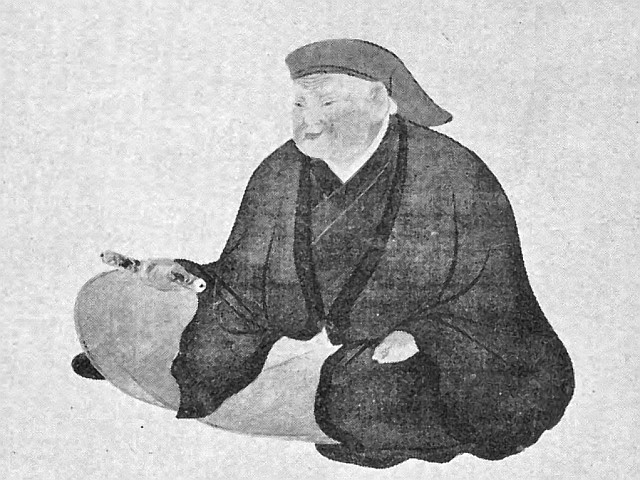
- Born: 1558; Kyoto, Japan
- Died: 27 February 1637; Kyoto, Japan
- Occupations: Calligrapher, craftsman, lacquerer, potter
- Known for: Pottery; Lacquerware; Calligraphy
- Notable work: White Raku; Writing Box with Pontoon Bridge
- Movement: Rinpa school

Hon'ami Kōetsu (Japanese: 本阿弥 光悦; 1558 – 27 February 1637) was a Japanese calligrapher, craftsman, lacquerer, potter, landscape gardener, connoisseur of swords and a devotee of the tea ceremony. His works are generally considered to have inspired the founding of the Rinpa school of painting.

Robert Hughes of Time Asia wrote that in Japan, Kōetsu is "a national treasure several times over, about as famous there as Benvenuto Cellini is in the West", even though in the United States he is "scarcely known".

== Early life ==
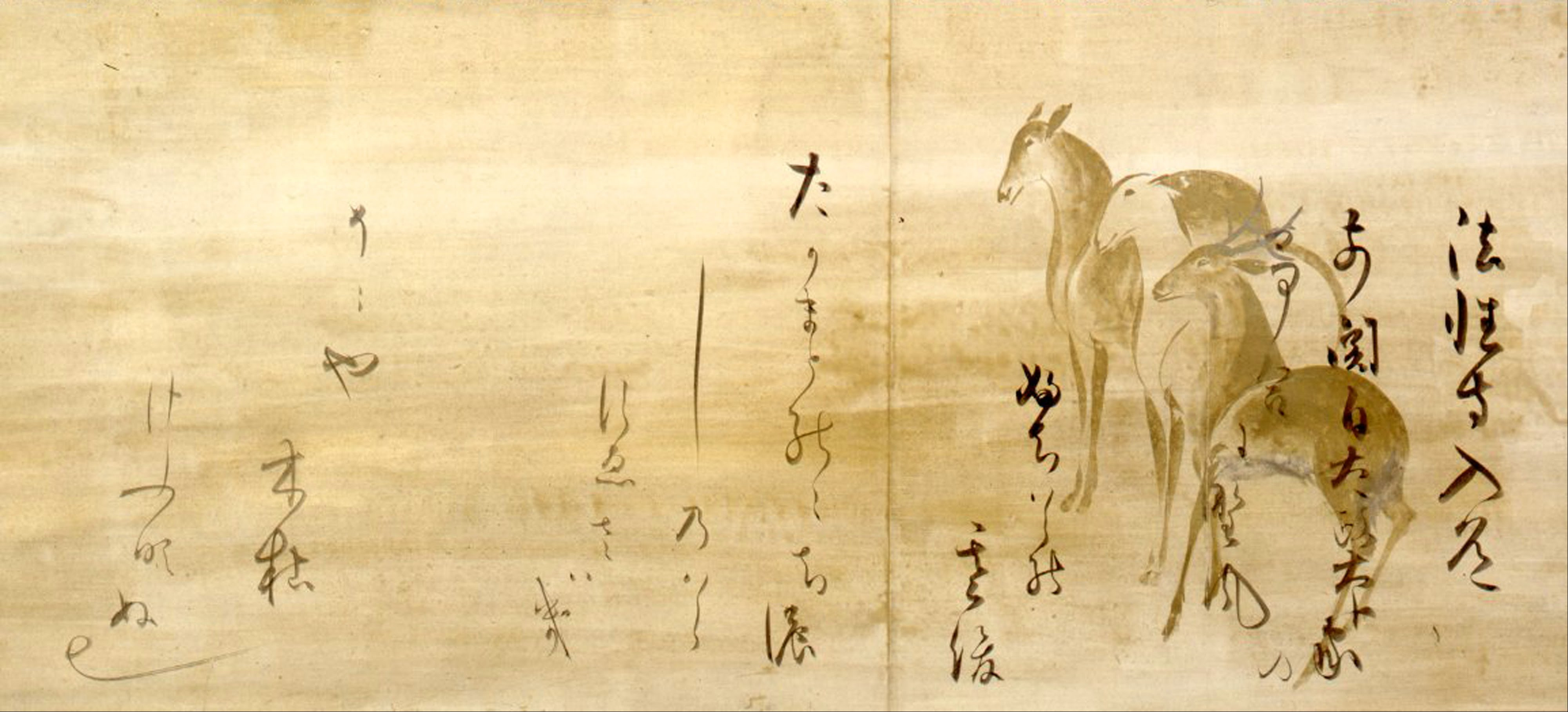
Calligraphy of Poems from the Shinkokin-wakashu on Paper Decorated with Deer

Kōetsu was born into a family of sword polishers and connoisseurs who had served the imperial court as well as such major warlords of the Sengoku period (1467–1603) such as Tokugawa Ieyasu and Oda Nobunaga. For generations, the Hon'ami family had been devotees of the Nichiren sect of Buddhism. Kōetsu's great-grandfather, Hon'ami Honkō (Kiyonobu), became a devout follower of the Nichiren priest Nisshin. Thereafter, the Hon'amis became important patrons of the temple founded by Nisshin, Honpō-ji (Kyoto), and Koetsu would continue this relationship of his family with that temple.

Kōetsu's grandfather was counted as one of the "companions and advisors" (同朋衆, dōbōshū) of Shōgun Ashikaga Yoshimasa. Kōetsu's father, Hon'ami Kōji (d. 1603), received a regular stipend from the Maeda family, in payment for his services as a sword connoisseur. Kōetsu would continue this relationship of his family with the Maeda, and with their domain in Kaga Province; he would advise the Maeda on swords, paintings, and other art objects. Kōetsu would meet many members of the art community through his connections with the Maeda, including tea master Kobori Enshū.

Kōetsu would also develop a close relationship with the Nō theater, and with the Kanze family of actors who lived near the Hon'ami family compound in northern Kyoto. He may have performed in Nō productions as a chanter, and designed a number of works for use by the actors or the theater.

== Skills ==
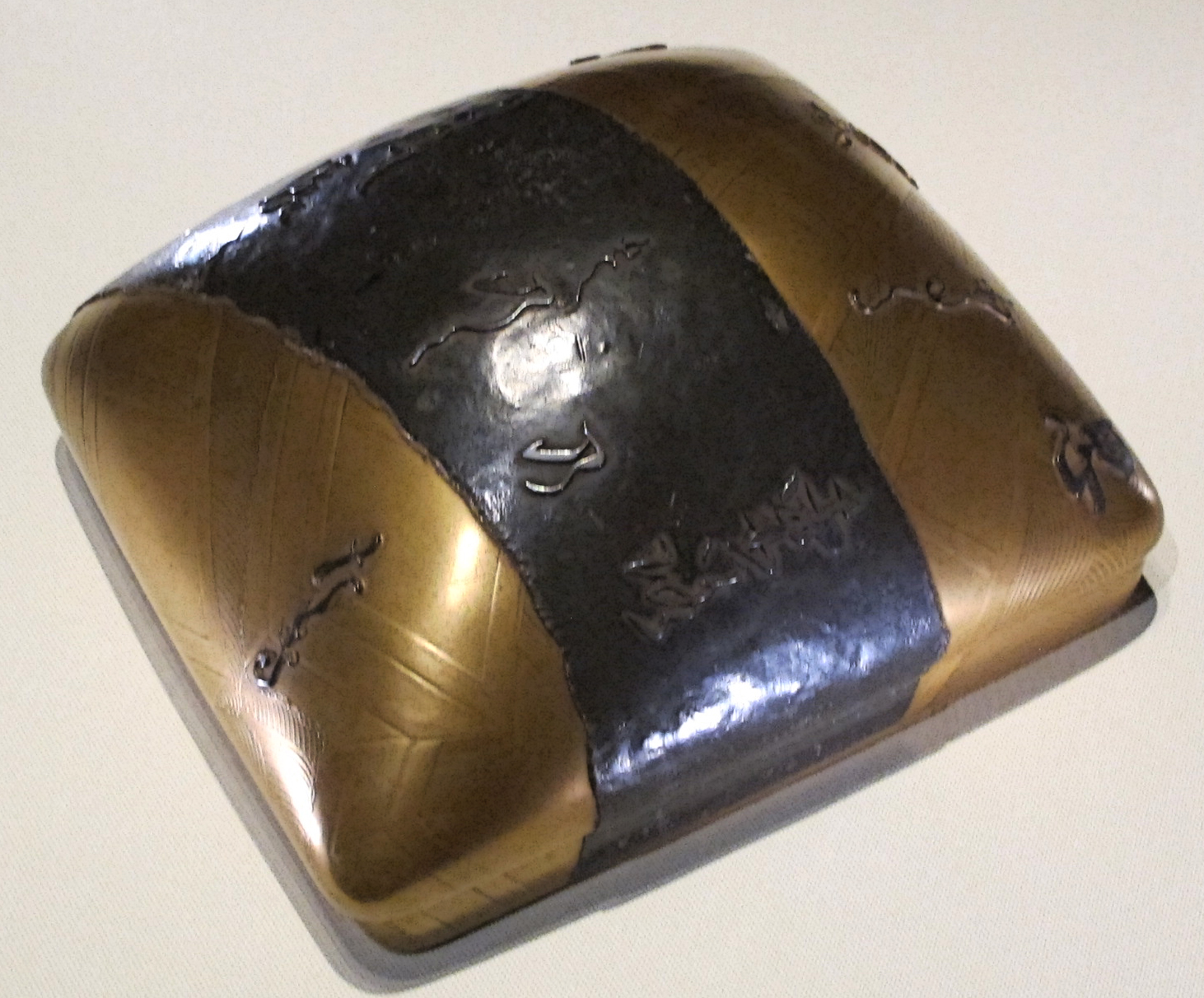
Writing Box with Pontoon Bridge by Kōetsu

Although trained as a swordpolisher (not a "swordsmith" in the standard Western sense; in Japan the tasks of forging and finishing a blade are performed by different craftsmen), Hon'ami became accomplished in pottery, lacquer, and ceramics as a result of his interest in Japanese tea ceremony, which had been revived and refined only a few decades earlier by Sen no Rikyū. In this art, he is regarded as one of the top pupils of the tea master Furuta Oribe and of the style known as Raku ware. Koetsu was given clay by Donyu II, the grandson of the first Raku potter, Chōjirō I. Even though Kōetsu form was inspired by the Raku family tradition, he was such a great artist he added his own character to his tea bowls. One of these (called "Fuji-san") is designated a National Treasure. In all of Kōetsu's surviving correspondence, only one letter in fact concerns swords. He is believed to have passed on his professional obligations in this matter to his adopted son Kōsa and grandson Kōho.

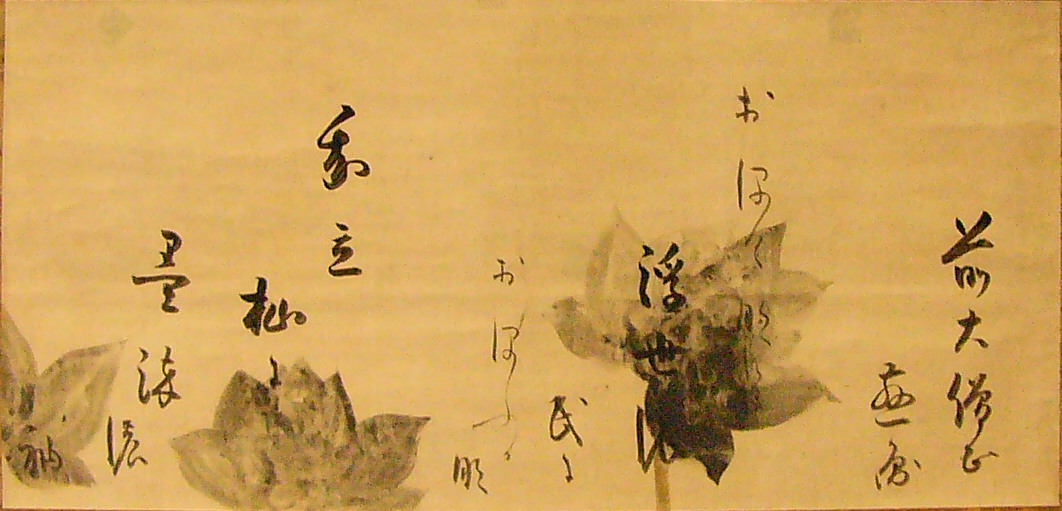
Calligraphy on Lotus painted paper

He was also one of the greatest calligraphers of his period, inspired as many of Japan's greatest calligraphers were, by the court writings of the Heian period. He was taught in this field by Prince Sonchō, who is said to have taught him the style of the famous classical Chinese calligrapher Wang Xizhi. He produced a wide variety of works, all in a flowing cursive style that recalled those classical traditions. Along with Konoe Nobutada and Shōkadō Shōjō, he came to be known as one of the Three Brushes or Sanpitsu of the Kan'ei Era (寛永の三筆, kan'ei no sanpitsu). Though he created a number of works in this classical style, Kōetsu also developed his own personal style of calligraphy, and taught it to many of his students.

Lacquer was yet another field in which Kōetsu was innovative and very active. Though earlier works attributed to him are quite conservative, towards the end of the 16th century and beginning of the 17th, he began to employ a number of innovative techniques. He specialized in designs using tin, lead and other base metals, along with gold and mother-of-pearl.

== Collaborations ==
Hon'ami entertained a close relationship with the painter Tawaraya Sōtatsu, who is supposed to have decorated many of Hon'ami calligraphic works in gold leaf and paint. The two worked very closely for about fifteen years after the turn of the 17th century, and some scholars believe the two artists were related by marriage. Sōtatsu was a major member of the Rinpa school, and his paintings most likely reflect some degree of Hon'ami's influence and style.

== Artist community ==
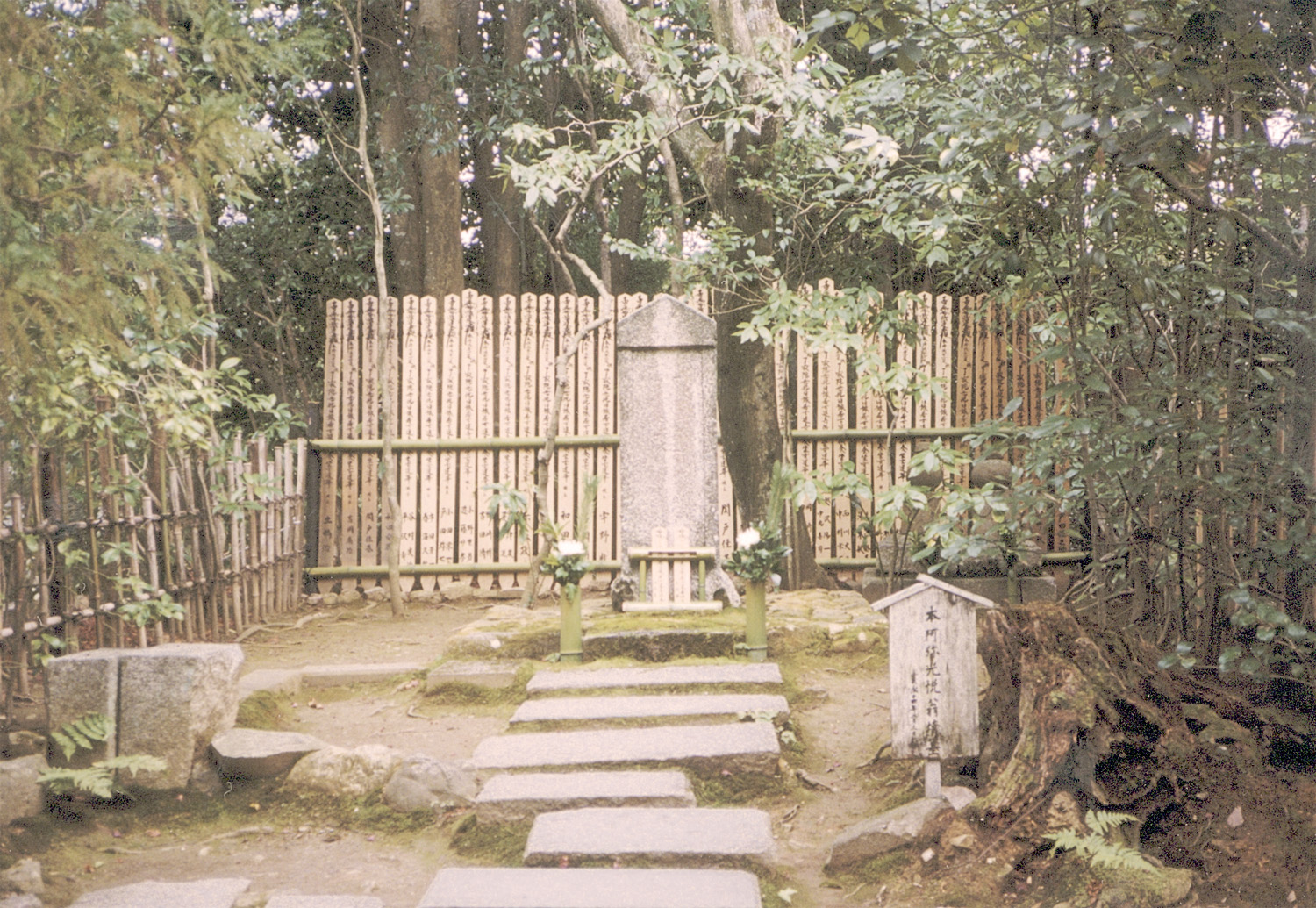
Honami Kōetsu's grave, Kyoto, Japan

In 1615, Hon'ami began an artist community northwest of Kyoto, in a place called Takagamine granted him by Tokugawa Ieyasu. Scholars disagree on whether this community was more focused on art or on religion, specifically Nichiren Buddhism, and whether this land grant was generous, or a form of exile. Nevertheless, it was here that Hon'ami would develop his unique style of painting and design which would later develop into the Rinpa school. The retreat was called Taikyo-an, and was used for prayer meetings and meditation, in addition to its function as an artist colony. A number of important figures, including the historian Hayashi Razan, visited there towards the end of Kōetsu's life. After his death in 1637, the colony was disbanded and the land was returned to the shogunate by Hon'ami Kōho, Kōetsu's grandson.

== Collectors ==
Ernest Fenollosa, one of the first American collectors and critics of Japanese art, is quoted as writing that Hon'ami is the only artist of what Fenollosa called the Early Modern period worthy of being compared to the earlier masters.

Hon'ami Kōetsu and his mother appear in Eiji Yoshikawa's novel Musashi. Hon'ami is portrayed in Hiroshi Inagaki's film Samurai II: Duel at Ichijoji Temple, which is based on the novel.

== Bibliography ==
- Fister, Pat (1985). "Hon'ami Kōetsu." Kodansha Encyclopedia of Japan<. Tokyo: Kodansha Ltd.
- Fisher, Felice (2000). The Arts of Hon'ami Koetsu, Japanese Renaissance Master. Philadelphia Museum of Art.
