= Ueda Sōko =

Japanese warlord (1563–1650)

Ueda Sōko 上田宗箇
- Born: 1563; Hoshizaki, Owari Province
- Died: 30 May 1650 (aged 88); Hiroshima City, Hiroshima
- Burial place: Kushiyama, Ōno, Hatsukaichi, Hiroshima and Sangen-in, Daitoku-ji, Kyoto
- Other names: Satarō 佐太郎, Shigeyasu 重安, Chikuin 竹隠
- Military career
- Allegiance: Niwa Nagahide, Toyotomi Hideyoshi, Asano Nagamasa, Asano Nagaakira, Tokugawa Ieyasu, Tokugawa Hidetada
- Rank: Karō, Daimyō
- Conflicts: Kyūshū Campaign, Siege of Odawara, Korean Campaigns, Battle of Sekigahara, Siege of Osaka
- Other work: Founder of the Ueda Sōko-ryū
- Associated tea masters: Furuta Oribe, Sen no Rikyū, Kobori Enshū, Hosokawa Sansai

The Ueda family crest kuginuki-mon

Ueda Sōko (上田宗箇) (1563 – 30 May 1650) was a warlord who lived during the Momoyama and early Edo Periods. He is best known for founding the Ueda Sōko-ryū, a warrior class school of Japanese tea ceremony from Hiroshima. Ueda Sōko went by the name Satarō (佐太郎) in his younger days and later Shigeyasu (重安). He received his Zen practitioner's name of Chikuin (竹隠) by the 111th patriarch of Daitoku-ji, Shunoku Sōen. Today his death plaque is enshrined at the Sangen-in sub-temple of Daitoku-ji, beside that of his long time teacher in the Way of Tea, Furuta Oribe. Sōko was held in high esteem by Toyotomi Hideyoshi for military exploits and as a tea master. In the Battle of Sekigahara (1600), Sōko sided with Toyotomi's Western Army and was thus defeated. During the Siege of Osaka Summer Campaign (1615), Sōko fought with Asano Yoshinaga on the Tokugawa side, and for this Sōko was given a pardon by Tokugawa Ieyasu. In 1619, the Tokogawa shogunate assigned the Geishū Domain to Asano Nagaakira and Sōko relocated to Hiroshima serving Nagaakira. Sōko was given a fief of 17,000 koku of rice in west Hiroshima (present day Hatsukaichi and Ōtake) and the role of Chief Retainer of the Geishū Domain for the Asano.

In 1632 (Year nine of Kan'ei Era) at the age of 70, Sōko retired from military duties and devoted himself to the Way of Tea. He immersed himself in a life of chanoyu: crafting tea equipage such as bamboo flower vases, chashaku tea scoops and firing raku ware tea bowls. Sōko developed his own school of chanoyu known as the Ueda Sōko-ryū. The school of Japanese tea ceremony continues in its 16th generation today, with an unbroken bloodline to Ueda Sōko.

== Ueda Sōko the Warrior and Daimyo ==
In 1585 (Year 13 of Tenshō), Sōko was recruited as a samurai under Toyotomi Hideyoshi and awarded land equivalent of 10,000 koku of rice in Echizen. This gave Sōko daimyō status. Under Hideyoshi, Sōko was assigned the role of supervisor for the construction of the temple for the great Buddha statue at Hōkō-ji temple in Kyoto. Sōko was distinguished as a warrior for his exploits in the Kyūshū Campaign, Siege of Odawara, and Hideyoshi's Korean Campaigns. After many years of military success, in 1594 (Year three of Bunroku Era) Hideyoshi awarded his niece to Sōko in marriage. Sōko sided with Hideyoshi's Western Army in the Battle of Sekigahara. After the Western Army's defeat, Sōko was welcomed by Hachisuka Iemasa the daimyo of Awa Province. As tea master to Iemasa, Sōko instructed chanoyu and built gardens and tea houses while in Tokushima. After three years serving Iemasa, Sōko was solicited by Asano Yoshinaga to join his clan ruling Kishū Province. Sōko came to Hiroshima in service of the Asano Clan as Chief Retainer (karō 家老) and tea master of the Hiroshima Domain in 1619.

== Style of Chanoyu ==
Ueda Sōko attended Rikyū's chanoyu practice (the Japanese Way of Tea) as a student for six years before becoming a student of Furuta Oribe for 24 years. Sōko was very close to Furuta Oribe and reverence for his teacher can be seen in the design of Wafūdō (tea villa built on the grounds of Hiroshima Castle). Sōko more or less replicates Oribe's tea house 'Ennan 燕庵' in the tea house 'Enshō 遠鐘' (meaning 'distant resonance of a temple bell') built at Wafūdō. The only difference is the addition of an additional tatami mat in size, requested by Asano Nagaakira. In Enshō, Sōko recreated an 'Oribe-kaku' tea room. This is small, wabi-cha tearoom with an extra tatami mat added to the left of the alcove to form a small passageway. The mat can be partitioned off or used to accommodate more guests. After koicha (thick tea), the extra mat called shōban-datami is used as a corridor for the guests to pass from the small wabi-cha tea room to the larger kusari-no-ma tea room (the shōban-datami is also used for vassals to wait for their lord during tea proceedings). In the left wall of the alcove of an Oribe-kaku tearoom there is a window made with woven wicker that opens to the shōban-datami space. Oribe hung flower vases on this wicker window. All this was copied by Sōko. Oribe favoured the spacious, kusari-no-ma style tea room that takes its name from a hanging kettle suspended by a chain from the ceiling. Sōko also reproduced this at Wafūdō as a shin (formal) tea room. In Sōko's tea garden at Wafūdō, he uses a 'naka-kuguri' (small opening in a high wall) for guests to pass between the outer and inner roji (tea garden) – again used by Oribe.

Sōko assisted Oribe in establishing a distinct genre of chanoyu for the warrior class referred to as buke sadō (武家茶道) or 'warrior tea'. As a dedicated tea disciple of Oribe, Ueda Sōko designed the Wafūdō tea complex inside Hiroshima Castle to conduct the new sukiya onari format. This shows that he and Oribe where in close communication during the time Oribe contrived this new format of chanoyu with Tokugawa Hidetada.

From Sōko's tea house design and the provisions he made for conducting chaji (formal tea gatherings), Sōko's style of chanoyu appears to be one that favoured a flow in proceedings, where guests experienced different gardens and tea rooms in the space of one gathering. This is in line with Oribe's style of tea rather than Rikyū's (Rikyū favoured small, two mat tearooms and gatherings where guests would keep to one room for the duration).

Sōko's tea aesthetics were also influenced by Rikyū. In the Notes from Sōko (Sōko-sama o-kikigaki) manuscript it is written: "The tips of Oribe's chashaku are free-flowing curves, but the tips of Sōko's chashaku have a bent or sharp angle, reminiscent of Rikyu's chashaku". Sōko is considered to have harmonised both Rikyū's wabi aesthetics and Oribe's aesthetics of hyōge (warped and playful).

Unlike Rikyū and Oribe who commissioned tea wares from artisans, Sōko made his own tea wares. In this pursuit he was one of the first warrior class teaists to craft o-niwa-yaki, tea bowls and other ceramic tea utensils fired in the garden of their castle residence (o-niwa-yaki means "fired in the garden").

The spirit of Ueda Sōko's chanoyu can be seen in the layout of his tea villa, Wafūdō. Pine trees were planted on the crossing bridge from the shoin residence to the tea pavilion to suggest crossing over to Jōdo (Buddhist Pure Land) During battle campaigns, Sōko would pass the time waiting for enemy forces by carving tea scoops. Examples are the chashaku named teki-gakure (waiting for the enemy). The only extant calligraphy work of Sōko is the single line scroll 'I welcome no layman to my abode'「門無俗士駕」(mon (ni) zokushi (no) ga nashi). The implication of the characters is "Upon mastering oneself through discipline and cultivating morality, those without such education and taste for the arts cease to appear at one's door". Throughout a life lived in the turbulent Warring States period, Sōko pursued a style of chanoyu that developed quietude for the mind and strength of spirit, deeply influenced by Zen morality.

Sōko created his school of tea with view for it to be transmitted through future generations. Sōko invested the teaching of his style of chanoyu into two families, the Normura and Nakamura. This role was called chaji azukari or Chief Retainers of the Teaching of Chanoyu. The first of these were Nomura Kyūmu and Nakamura Mototomo. The families also served as Sōko's vassals, controlling fiefs of 100 koku of rice each, given to them by Sōko. Under Sōko's direction, the Nomura and Nakamura families taught and conducted chanoyu for the Asano and Ueda families. It is thanks to this structure that the Ueda Sōko-ryū continues to the present day.

== Teacher, Furuta Oribe ==
Ueda Sōko learned from Furuta Oribe for 24 years. Daimyō Asano Yoshinaga had Ueda Sōko question Furuta Oribe about chanoyu on his behalf (in the position of Yoshinaga's Chief Retainer and tea master). Sōko recorded Oribe's responses and delivered them to Asano Yoshinaga. The studious work of Sōko compiling Oribe's teachings survives in the manuscript known variously as Question and Answer with Oribe (茶道長問織答抄) and A Record of Sōho's Enquiries to Oribe (宗甫公古織江御尋書). It is one of the central documents for understanding the chanoyu of Furuta Oribe. The manuscript was shared with tea master for the Tokugawa shogunate, Kobori Enshū. This proves that Ueda Sōko and Kobori Enshū shared intimate correspondence on chanoyu. Both were leading disciples of Furuta Oribe.

The tradition of sukiya onari (the shōgun visiting a daimyō's residence for a formal tea gathering) started during the rule of Tokugawa Hidetada, the second generation Tokugawa shōgun. Furuta Oribe was Hidetada's tea master at this time and assumed a directorial role in the development of sukiya onari, a format of tea gathering especially for the warrior class, designed for entertaining the shōgun and daimyō. Following Oribe's ideas, Ueda Sōko designed the Wafūdō tea complex inside Hiroshima Castle to cater for the new sukiya onari format. After entering the castle gates for an official visit, the shōgun would first enter a roji (tea garden) and participate in chanoyu (a formal tea gathering) as the first part of the visit. The tea gathering would proceed from the sukiya (wabi-cha tearoom) to the kusari-no-ma (formal room with hanging kettle). Upon concluding chanoyu, the shōgun would cross to the shoin reception complex via a covered bridge where traditional entertainment from the time of the Ashikaga shogunate would take place. The current home of the Ueda Sōko-ryū is a reconstruction of the Wafūdō built by Ueda Sōko on the grounds of Hiroshima Castle. As such, it provides a rare example of the warrior style of chanoyu developed by Furuta Oribe and Ueda Sōko.

== Gardens by Ueda Sōko ==
Before his fame as a tea master, Sōko gained fame in the arts through his skill as a landscape gardener for palaces and temples throughout Honshū and Shikoku.

=== Omotegoten Garden of Old Tokushima Castle, Tokushima ===
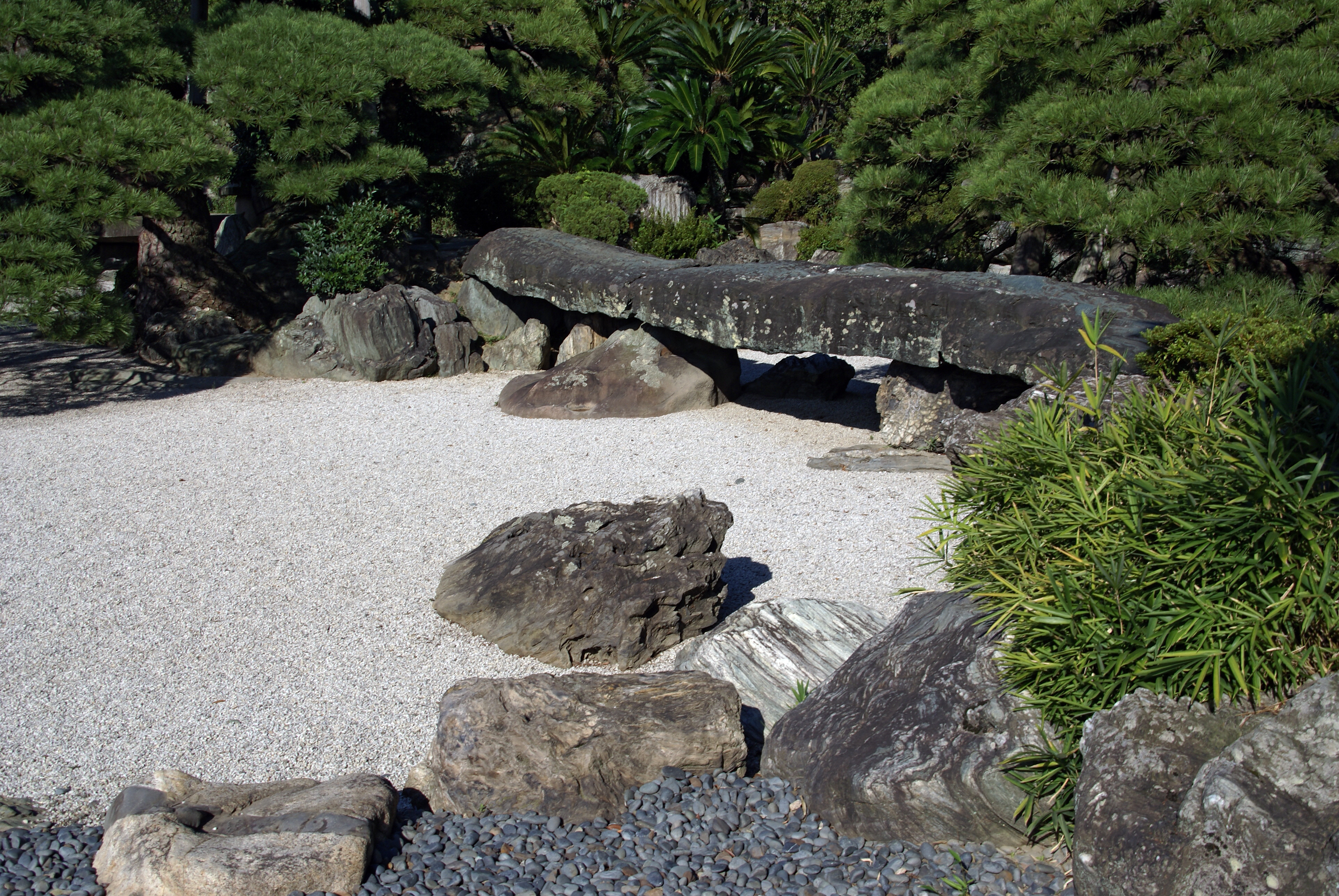
Omotegoten Garden of Old Tokushima Castle, Tokushima

(Designated National Place of Scenic Beauty) Garden of the Hachisuka Family on the grounds of Tokushima Castle.

=== Ni no Maru Garden, Nagoya Castle ===
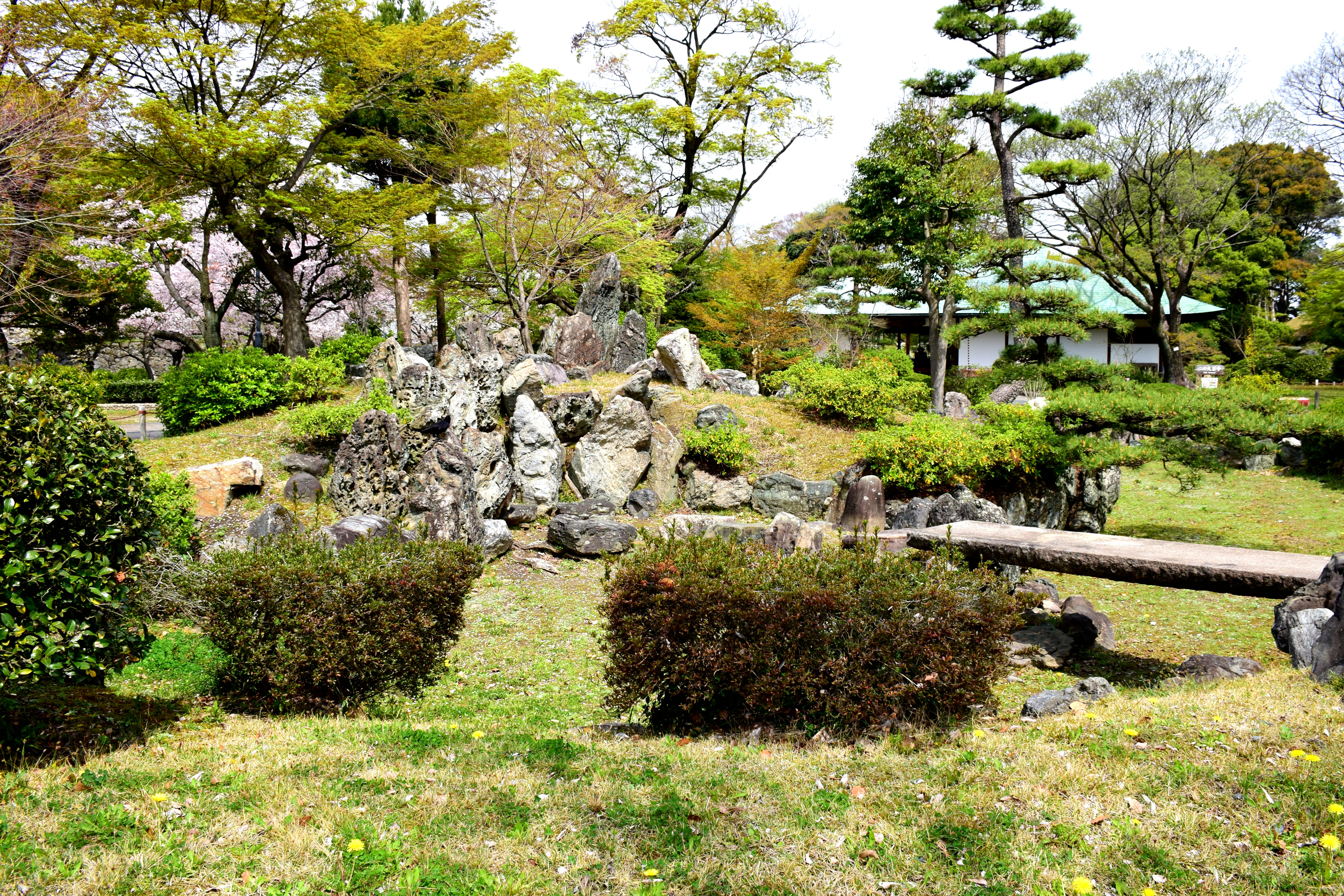
Ni no Maru Garden, Nagoya Castle

Designed and built under order from Tokugawa Ieyasu in Genna 1 (1614) at the Ninomaru Garden, Nagoya Castle. Designated National Place of Scenic Beauty.

=== Shukkei-en, Hiroshima ===
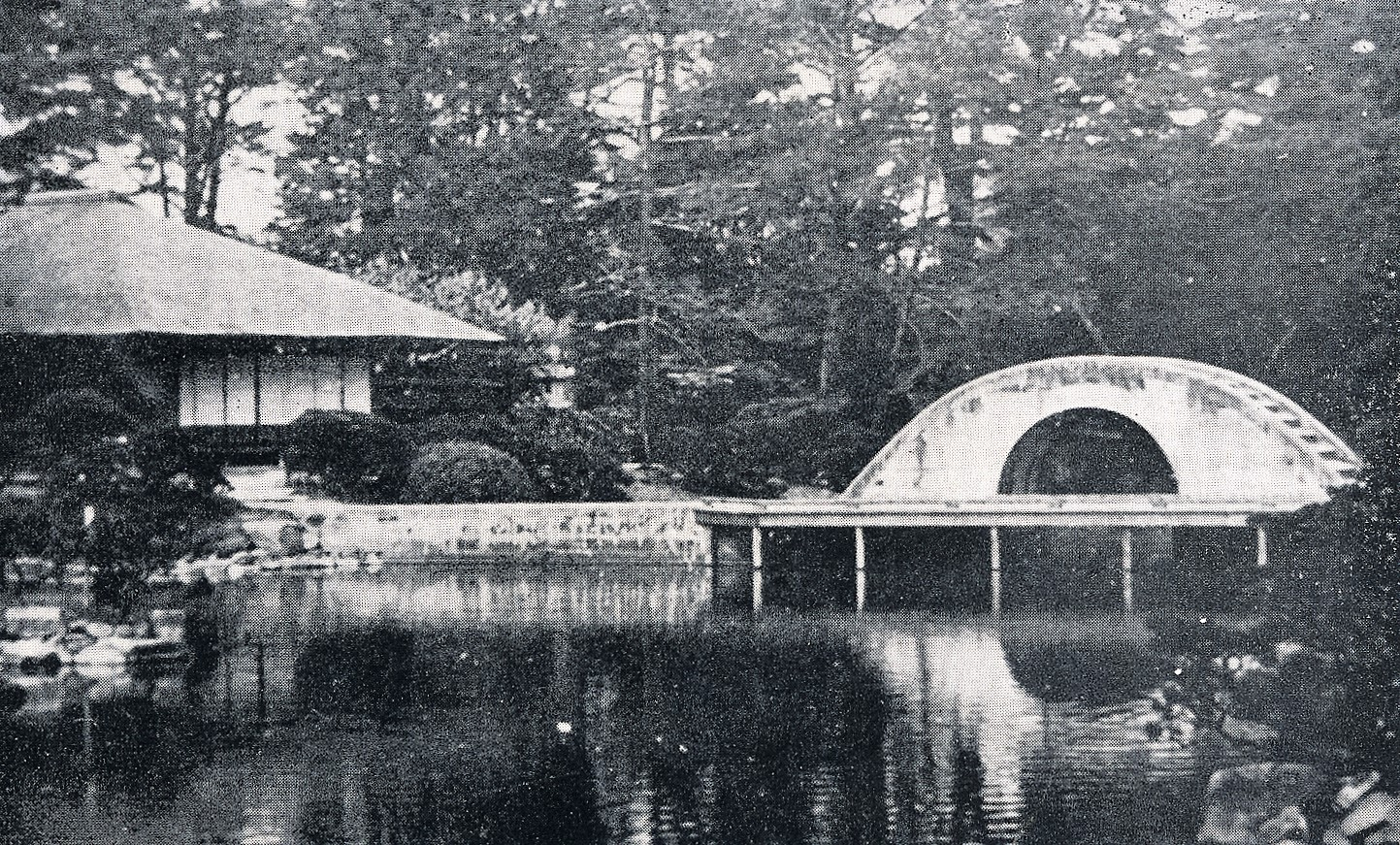
Pre-war image of Shukkei-en

Designated National Place of Scenic Beauty. Built as a second residence, Shukkei-en was also called the ‘lake residence’, of Lord Asano, the Daimyo of the Geishū (Hiroshima) Domain. This garden was built in the walkaround style of early Edo Period daimyo gardens.

=== Nisinomaru Garden, Wakayama Castle ===
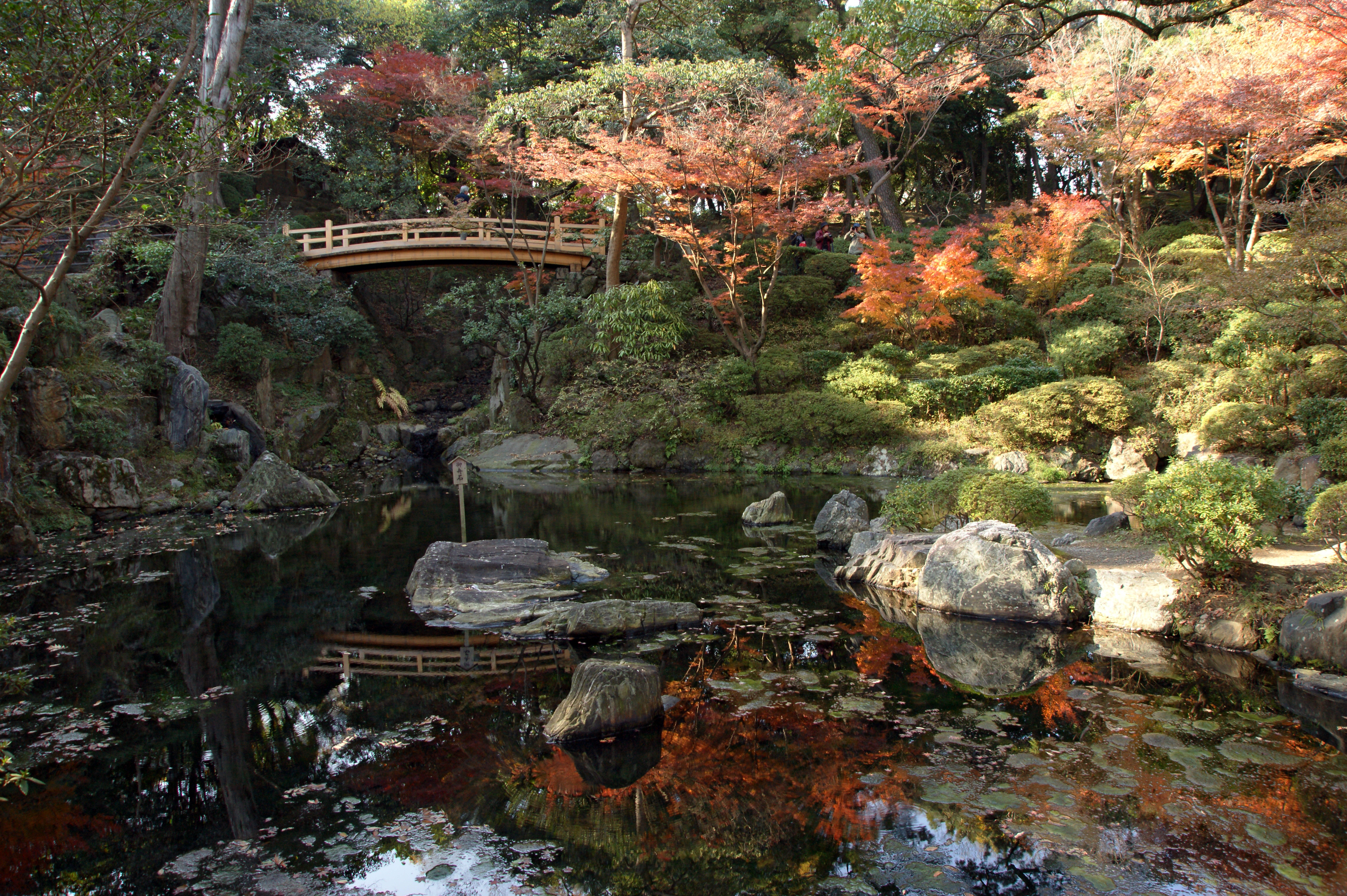
Nishi no Maru Garden, Wakayama Castle

Designated National Place of Scenic Beauty. Sōko was assigned to the reconstruction of Wakayama Castle and the design and construction of the Nisinomaru Garden.

=== Hōkō-ji, Kyoto ===
Hideyoshi assigned Sōko as supervisor of the construction of the Daibutsuden (temple housing a large icon of the Buddha) at Hōkō-ji Temple.

=== Wafūdō, Hiroshima Castle ===
Sōko constructed a second wafūdō tea house complex on the main residence of the Ueda family on the grounds of Hiroshima Castle. This Wafūdō reflected the original Wafūdō built in Kishū Province. The Hiroshima Wafūdō included a sukiya tearoom called Enshō, a kusari-no-ma tearoom called Kenkei and the training complex Ankantei. As part of the construction Sōko planted a pine at the summit of Shijōyama mountain. The pine is known as Sōko Matsu ("Soko's Pine") and the mountain is also known as Sōkoyama ("Mount Sōko").

== Death ==
Ueda Sōko died at 88 years of age. His oldest son was required to serve the Edo Bakufu which left his second eldest son, Shigemasa, to become heir of the Ueda family in Hiroshima. When Shigemasa died on 10 April at age 44, Sōko abstained from food and water from the same day until dying 21 days later on 1 May (by the lunar calendar). According to Sōko's biography, on the morning of the 1st, Sōko rose, purified his mouth, drank tea and lay down dead. Sōko's ashes were ground into dust and set adrift on the current of the Seto Inland Sea.
