= Nisshin (monk) =

Japanese monk (1407–1488)

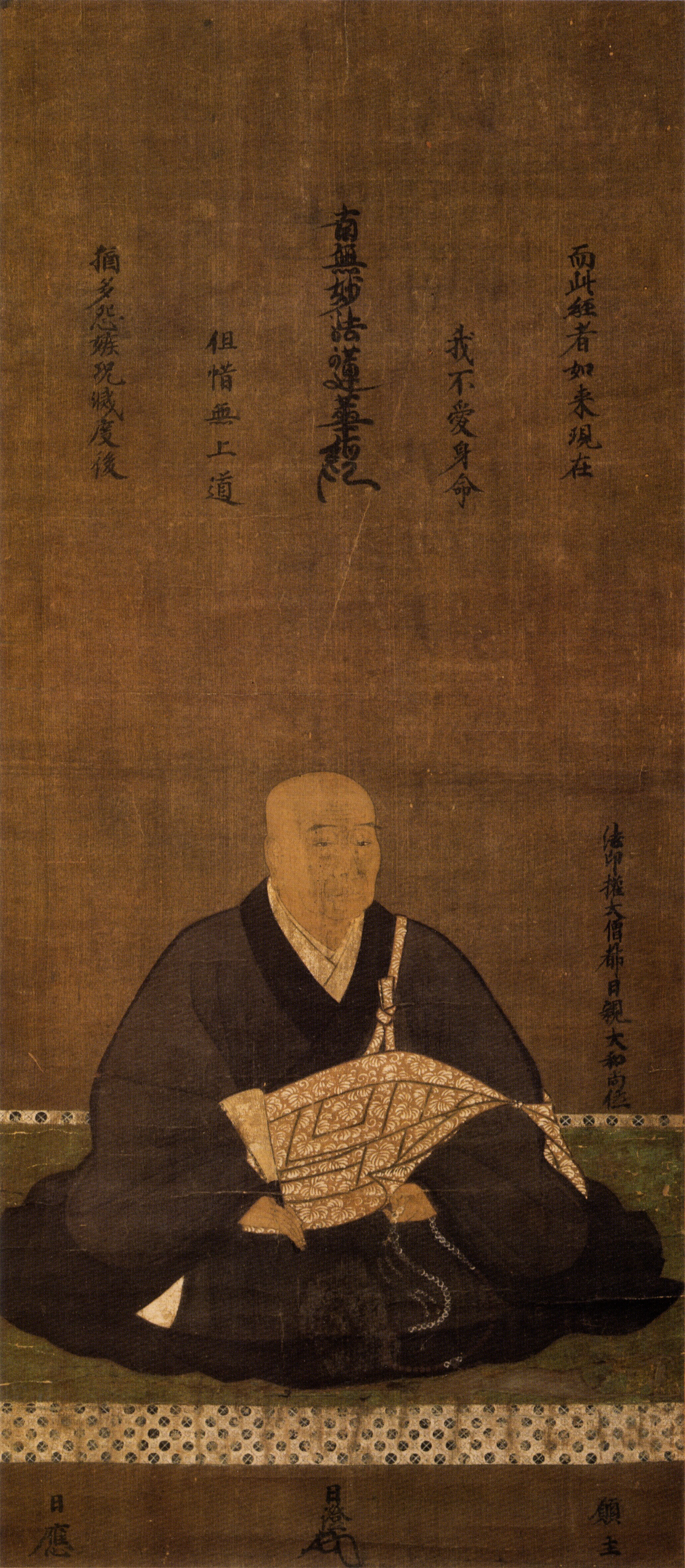
Priest Nisshin

Nisshin (日親, October 14, 1407 – October 21, 1488) was a Nichiren Buddhist priest during the Muromachi period in Japan. He is the son of Hinaya Shigetsugu. Nisshin was the first to use the concept of "fuju fuse" (不受不施義) which is to neither give nor receive alms. He received the posthumous name Kudō Shigeruin (久遠成院).

== Biography ==
Nisshin was born in Kazusa province on October 14, 1407. After receiving instruction from his paternal uncle Nichiei, Nisshin entered Hokekyo-ji. In 1427, Nisshin travelled towards the capital stopping at various temples along the way in Kamakura, Kyoto, and other such cities. As he did so, he spread his teachings. In 1433 he continued towards Hizen province as a head priest of the Nakayamonryū lineage with some followers. However, due to harsh shakubu preachings, Nisshin himself was heavily opposed and eventually expelled from the Nakayamonryū lineage. Then in 1437 as Nisshin made his way still towards the capital, he opened Honpō-ji. Along the way, he was also able to convert many temples into those following the Nichiren school of Buddhism. In doing such, he gained the opportunity to preach to the shōgun of the time, Ashikaga Yoshinori. Nisshin used this time to preach about not giving alms to temples. This talk unfortunately aggravated the shōgun so that he placed a ban upon Nisshin's sermons.

Nisshin, of course, couldn't stop himself from spreading his teachings and violated the ban. In 1440, he was imprisoned as punishment for breaking the ban and his temple destroyed. He continued to preach even during his imprisonment. As the legend goes, during his imprisonment, Nisshin had a pot put over his head to shut him up. It's said not even a scolding hot pot could make Nisshin stop sermonizing. This story became known as the tale of the “pot-wearing saint” or sometimes referred to as “the pot-wearing Nisshin.”

In 1441, during the Kakitsu era, there was the Kakitsu uprising. This uprising saw the assassination of the 6th shōgun. Because of this, Nisshin was able to escape his imprisonment and began rebuilding his temple Honpō-ji. The year 1460 however saw the destruction of Honpō-ji once again. This was because Nisshin had continued to preach despite the previous ban on his actions. The temple was destroyed and Nisshin was summoned to the capital by the 8th shōgun, Ashikaga Yoshimasa. Nisshin was escorted by Chiba Mototane to Kyoto. He was taken to the residence of Hosokawa Mochikata to be imprisoned this time. While imprisoned there, he made the acquaintance of Hon'ami Honkō (Kiyonobu), of the distinguished Hon'ami family of sword experts., who became his devout follower. The two were both able to become free from their imprisonment thanks to the collaboration of local lords. These lords also frequently gave to Honpō-ji. Nisshin continued preaching in Honpō-ji until his death in 1488 at the age of 82 years-old.

== Fuju Fuse ==
Most famous of Nisshin's practices was that of the Fuju Fuse—refusing to accept or give donations to others outside of the Hokke lineages. This practice was meant to portray an image of self-sustaining and self-governing ability within the sect. In doing so, Nisshin's line had not only regained some power to the organization but began to set a competitive tone against legal authorities. This would add fuel to the later fires of movements to remove more power from Buddhist organizations and the subsequent destruction of temples.

== Personality ==
Nisshin was greatly revered for his skill in his monastic life. Virtuous Deeds, written by Honji-in Nissho, gave a hagiographical recount of his life, frequently highlighting his swift understanding of teachings as well as his strong ability to convert others. Nisshin had followed heavily in the footsteps of Japanese priest Nichiren—founder of Nichiren Buddhism—taking up a willful suffering for the Lotus Sutra or practicing "admonishing of the state" as Nichiren had. Nisshin had faced imprisonment for three days for his admonishing, which he met with thankful pleasure in being able to serve the Lotus Sutra so sacrificially. Out of respect to Nichiren's original views, he wished to preserve the exclusivity of the organization to maintain its purity regardless of intra-sect opposition.

== Temples ==
Nisshin established the Honpō-ji temple in 1436, the temple represents a branch of the prevalent Nichiren buddhist sect. Honpō-ji was originally located at Higashi-no-toin Ayanokoji. The temple was destroyed in a fire in 1440, by the Shōgun Yoshinori. The temple was rebuilt in 1455 near Shijo Takakura by Emperor Go-Hanazono. In 1460, the hapless fate of the burning of the Honpō-ji temple arose again. The arson was an order given by the shōgun Ashikaga Yoshimasa, whose reasons for the fire rested on propagandistic affairs. The temple however, achieved reconstruction and relocated to Sanjo Madenokoji in 1460. The temple was prosperous for a period of time, but faced another twist of fate when it had to relocate once again. It was later rebuilt near the Ichijo Modoribashi bridge along the narrow Horikawa river. Honpō-ji's final and current location resides near Ogawa Teranouchi. The temple is also extremely renowned because its relocation was enforced during the period of the reconstruction and reorganization of the city by Toyotomi Hideyoshi in 1587. Jojakko-ji temple was also founded in (1561-1617) by Nisshin and is located in the Arashiyama area. It is a well known Nichiren sect temple and was the place where Nisshin spent his life in retirement in 1596.
