= Komuro =

Komuro (written: 小室) is a Japanese surname. Notable people with the surname include:

- Daichi Komuro (born 1988), Japanese handball player
- Keiko Komuro (小室 桂子, born 1972), Japanese singer
- Koji Komuro (小室 宏二, born 1977), Japanese judoka
- Nozomi Komuro (小室, born 1985), Japanese skeleton racer
- Komuro Suiun (小室 翠雲, 1874–1945), Japanese painter
- Tetsuya Komuro (小室 哲哉, born 1958), Japanese musician
- Yuri Komuro (小室 友里, born 1976), Japanese AV idol, actress and writer

== See also ==
- Komuro Station, a railway station in Funabashi, Chiba Prefecture, Japan
- Komuro Castle (小室城), formerly in Ōmi Province, present Nagahama, Shiga
