= Honpō-ji (Kyoto) =

Nichiren Buddhist temple in Kyoto, Japan

Coordinates: 35°02′06″N 135°45′08″E

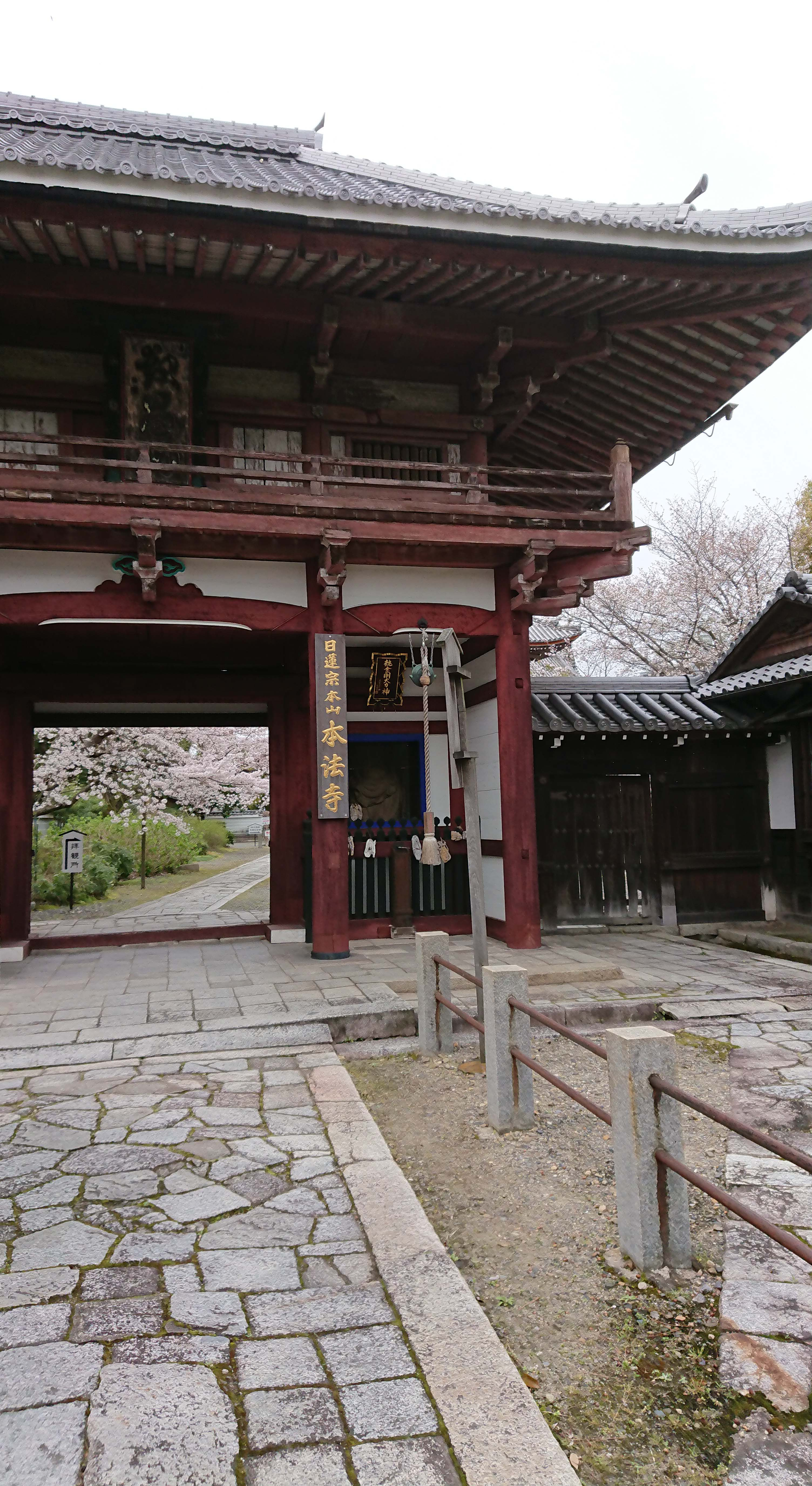
Front gate to Honpo-ji (Kyoto)

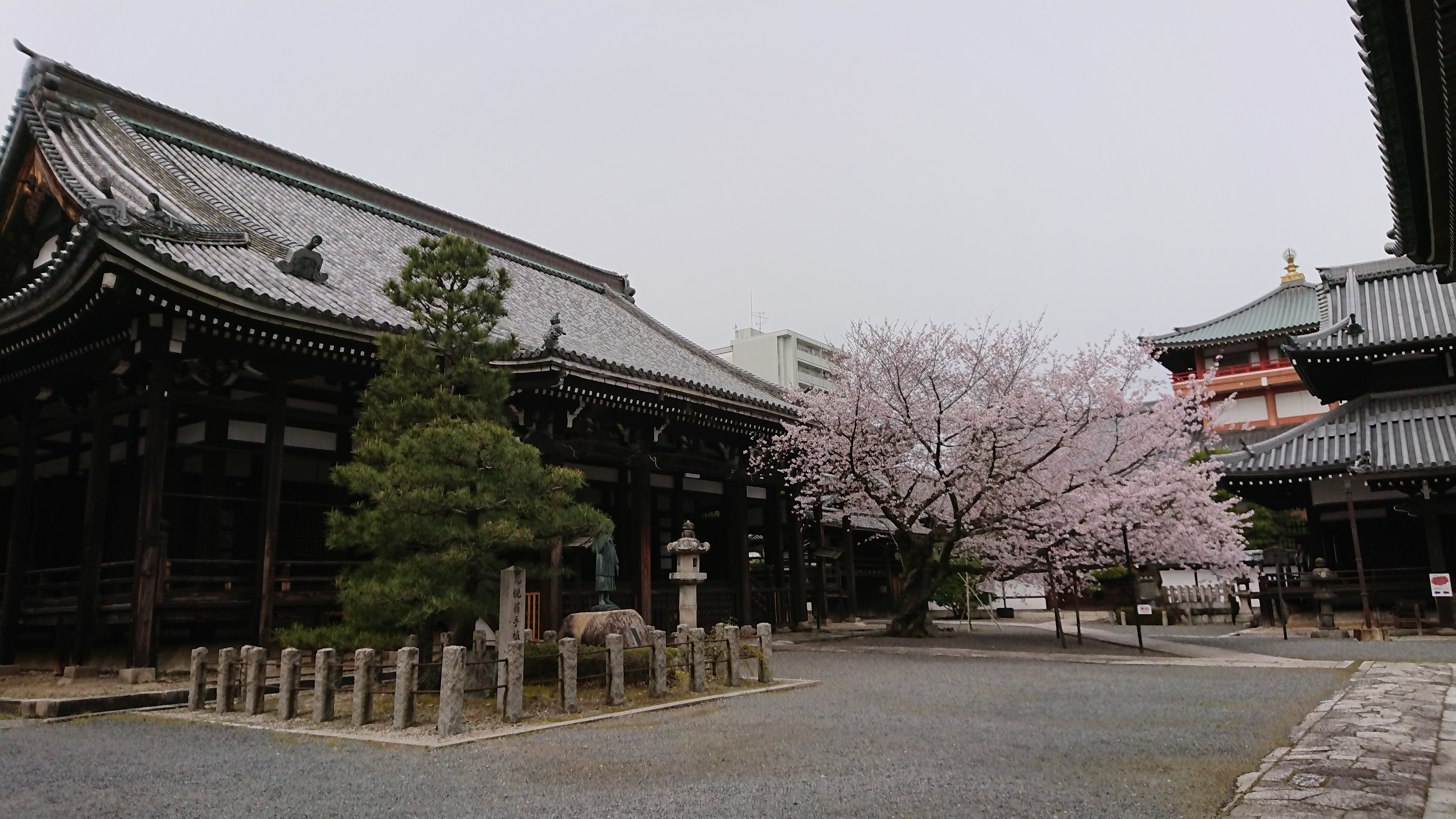
Inside the compound

Honpō-ji (本法寺) is a Nichiren Buddhist (specifically Nichiren-shū) temple in Kyoto, Japan. Its sangō (山号; lit., "mountain name"; a type of appellation carried by many Buddhist temples) is "Eishōzan" (叡昌山).

== History ==
Honpō-ji was established in 1436 by Nisshin. It was originally constructed in the Higashinotōin-Ayakōji (東洞院綾小路) area of the city, but when Nisshin angered the shōgun Ashikaga Yoshimitsu and was imprisoned, the temple was destroyed. Nisshin at last was pardoned in 1462, and rebuilt his temple at Sanjō-Marikōji in central Kyoto the following year, 1463. Nisshin's teachings thereafter gained a large following in Kyoto, and his temple, Honpō-ji, became a major head temple (honzan) in central Kyoto. After Nisshin's death, the Tenmon Hokke Rebellion of 1536 occurred in Kyoto, and all the Nichiren sect temples were destroyed. In 1542, however, Honpō-ji was rebuilt at Ichijō Horikawa-agaru, and in 1590, it was moved to its present location, at Ogawa Teranouchi-agaru in the Kamigyō-ku ward of Kyoto city. It was ravaged in the Great Tenmei Fire of 1788, and so, most of the current buildings are reconstructions dating from after 1788.

== Works cited ==
- Asai, Endō (2001). "Honpō-ji". Encyclopedia Nipponica (in Japanese). Shogakukan.
