= Furuta Oribe =

Japanese daimyō

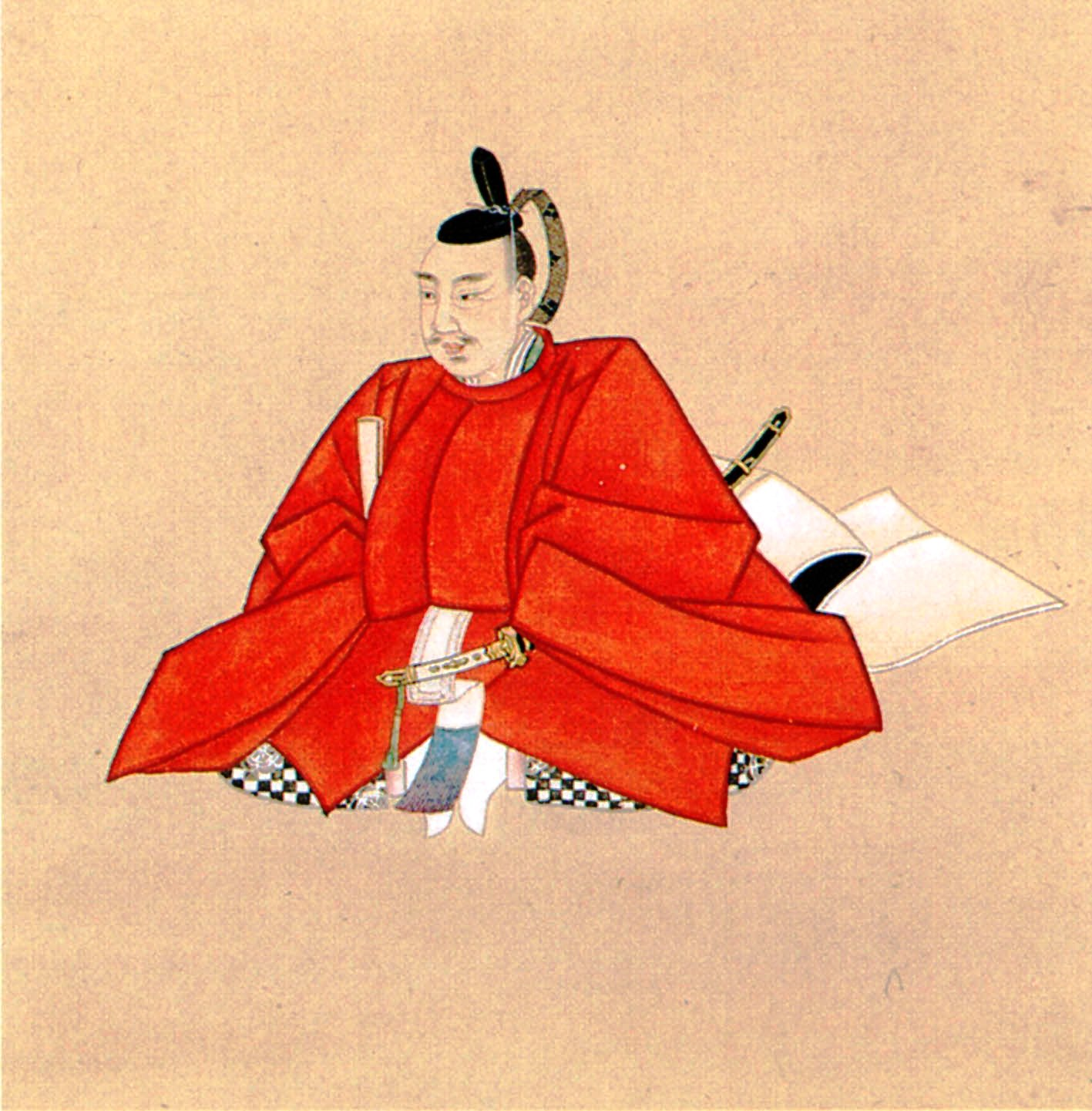
- Born: 1544; Motosu, Mino Province
- Died: 6 July 1615; Fushimi, Yamashiro Province
- Burial place: Daitoku-ji and Kōshō-ji, Kyoto
- Military career
- Nicknames: Oribe, Sasuke

Furuta Oribe (古田 織部; 1544 – 6 July 1615), whose birth name was Furuta Shigenari (古田 重然), was a daimyō and celebrated master of the Japanese tea ceremony. He was originally a retainer of Oda Nobunaga and Toyotomi Hideyoshi.

== Biography ==
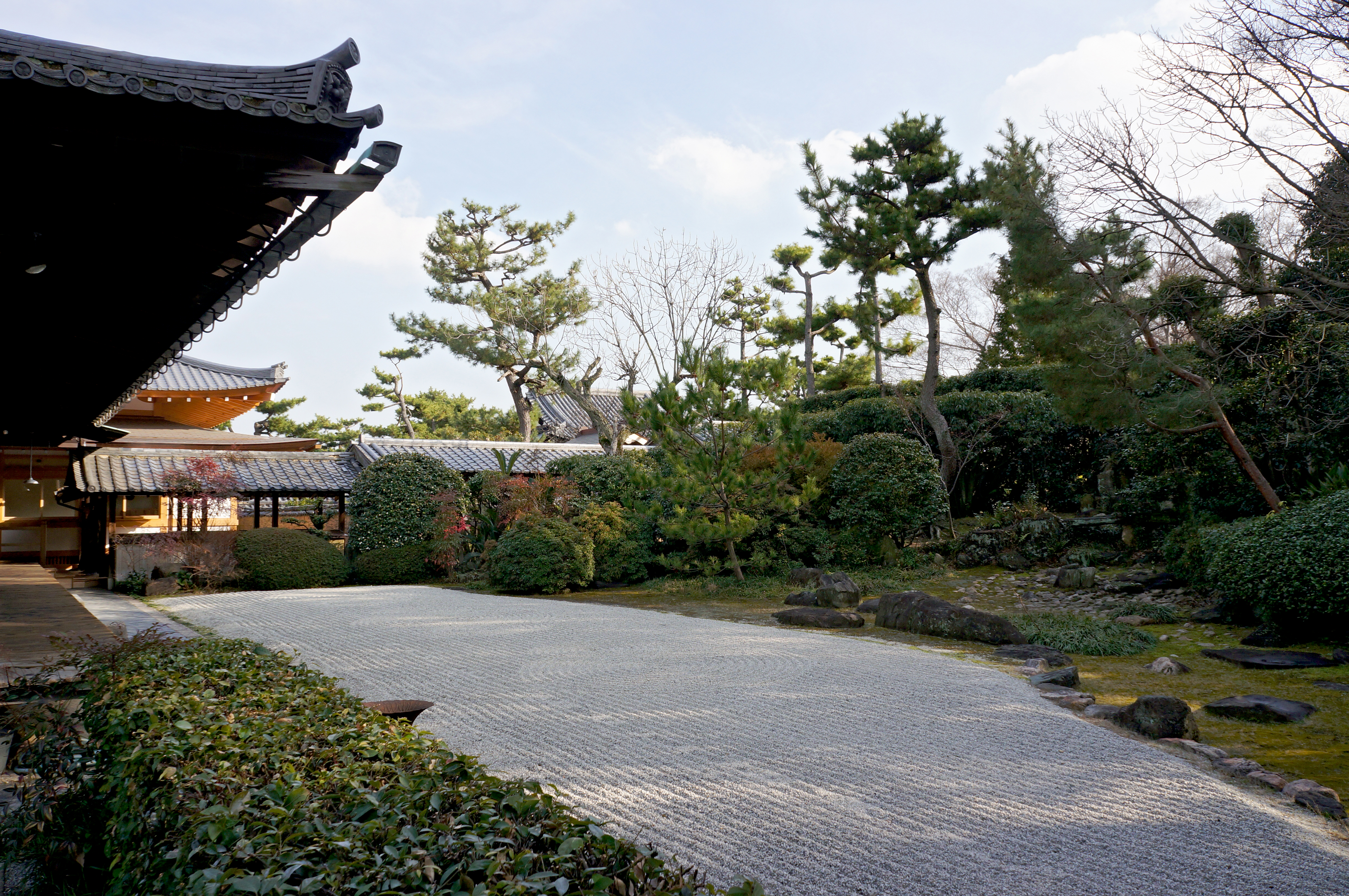
Stone garden of Nanshū-ji in Sakai, Osaka prefecture, where Furuta Oribe was involved in its design

His teacher in the tea ceremony was Sen no Rikyū. He became the foremost tea master in the land after Rikyū's death, and taught this art to the shōgun Tokugawa Hidetada. Among his other particularly famous tea ceremony students were Ueda Sōko, Kobori Enshū and Hon'ami Kōetsu.

The kind of tea ceremony that he established is known as Oribe-ryū (see Schools of Japanese tea ceremony), and the style of ceramics that are attributed to his artistic influence are known as Oribe ware. He also designed a style of stone lantern for the roji tea garden, known as Oribe-dōrō.

During the year 1600, Oribe received a 10,000-koku income. During the Osaka Campaign of 1615, Oribe was forced to plot in Kyoto against the Tokugawa, on the behalf of the defenders of Osaka. After this event, Oribe and his son were ordered to commit suicide (seppuku).

== Honours ==
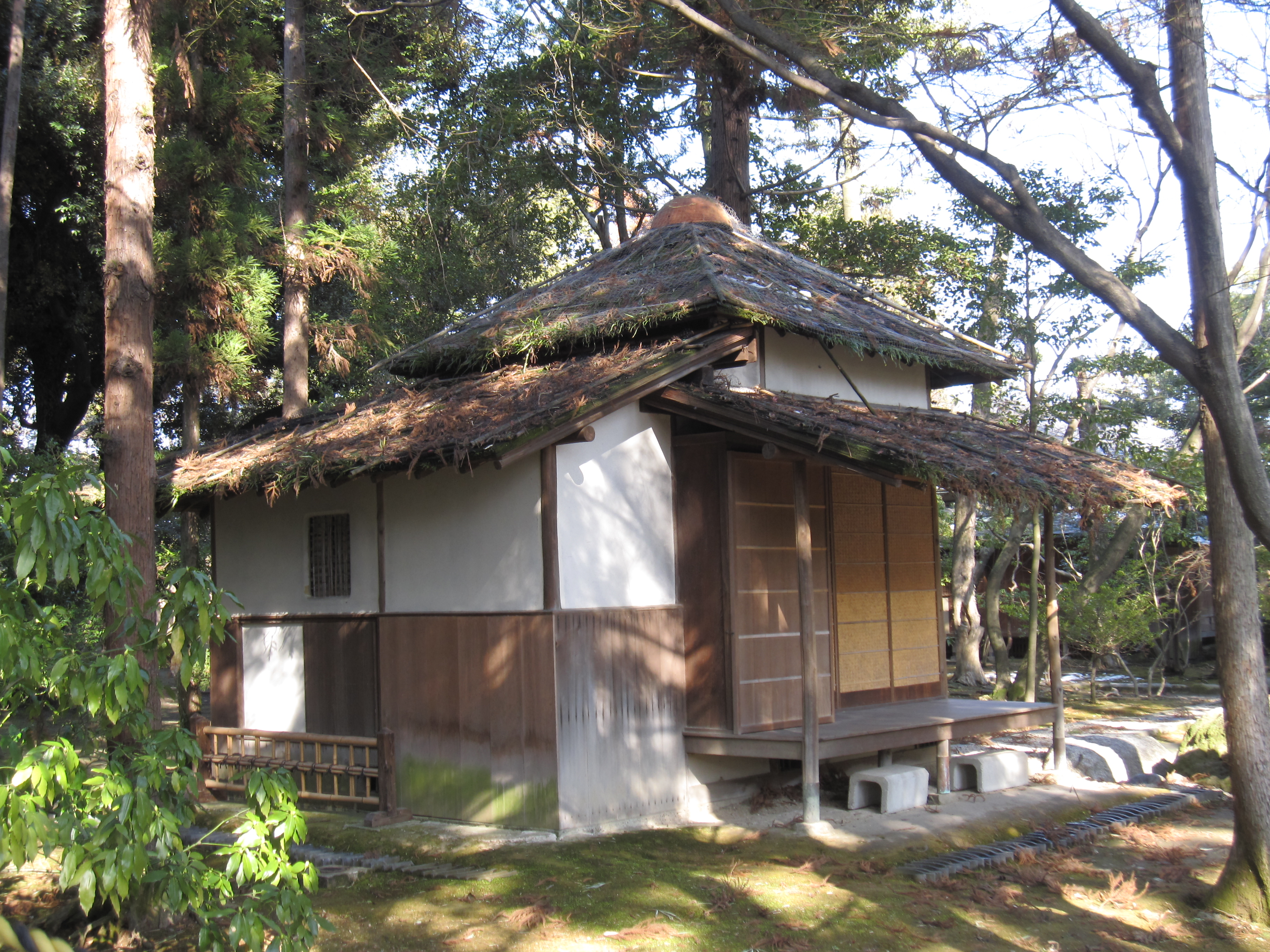
Oribe-dō tea house, dedicated to the memory of Lord Furuta Oribe

Oribe-dō (織部堂) is a chashitsu at Nagoya Castle dedicated to his memory since he spread the practice of tea in Nagoya. The memorial hall was constructed in 1955.

== In media ==
Hyouge Mono is a Japanese manga written and illustrated by Yoshihiro Yamada. It was adapted into an anime series in 2011, and is a fictional depiction of Oribe's life.

Oribe is the subject of an advertisement by the Furuta Confectionery Company.

== See also ==
- Ueda Sōko (Shigeyasu)
