= Kobori Enshū =

Japanese artist and aristocrat

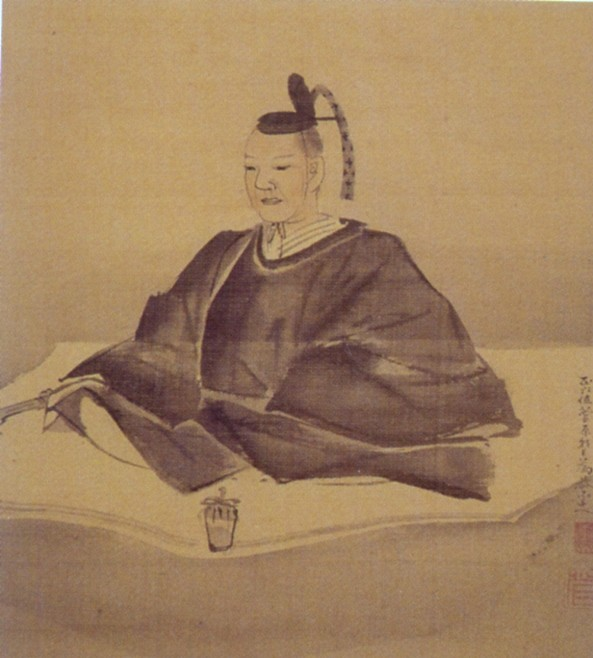
- Kobori Enshū before 1868
- Born: 1579; Japan
- Died: March 12, 1647 (aged 67–68)
- Occupations: Aristocrat; artist; poet

Kobori Enshū (小堀 遠州; 1579 – March 12, 1647) was a Japanese aristocrat, garden designer, painter, poet, and tea master during the reign of Tokugawa Ieyasu.

== Biography ==
His personal name was Masakazu (政一). In 1604, he received as inheritance a 12,000-koku fief in Ōmi Province at Komuro, present Nagahama, Shiga.

He excelled in the arts of painting, poetry, Ikebana flower arrangement, and Japanese garden design. His accomplishments include garden designs for the Sentō Imperial Palace and Katsura Imperial Villa (Kyoto), Kōdai-ji, Sunpu Castle, the Nagoya Castle keep, Bitchū Matsuyama Castle, and the central enceintes of Fushimi Castle, Nijō-jō (Kyoto), and Osaka Castle.

He was though known best as a master of the tea ceremony. His style soon on became known as "Enshū-ryū". In light of his ability, he was tasked with teaching the 3rd Tokugawa shōgun, Tokugawa Iemitsu the ways of tea ceremony. In this role, he designed many tea houses including the Bōsen-seki in the subtemple of Kohō-an at the Daitoku-ji, and the Mittan-seki at the Ryūkō-in of the same temple as well as the Hassō-an.

One famous anecdote about him is that he accepted to do the gardens of the Imperial Villa of Katsura only with two conditions: limitless time and money.
