= Uji tea =

Tea from the Uji region in Japan

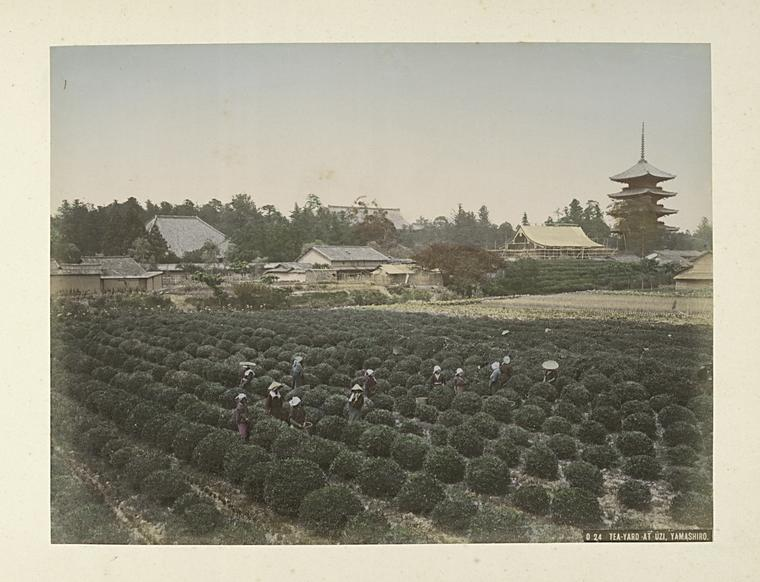
Tea-Yard at Uji, Yamashiro, 1890s

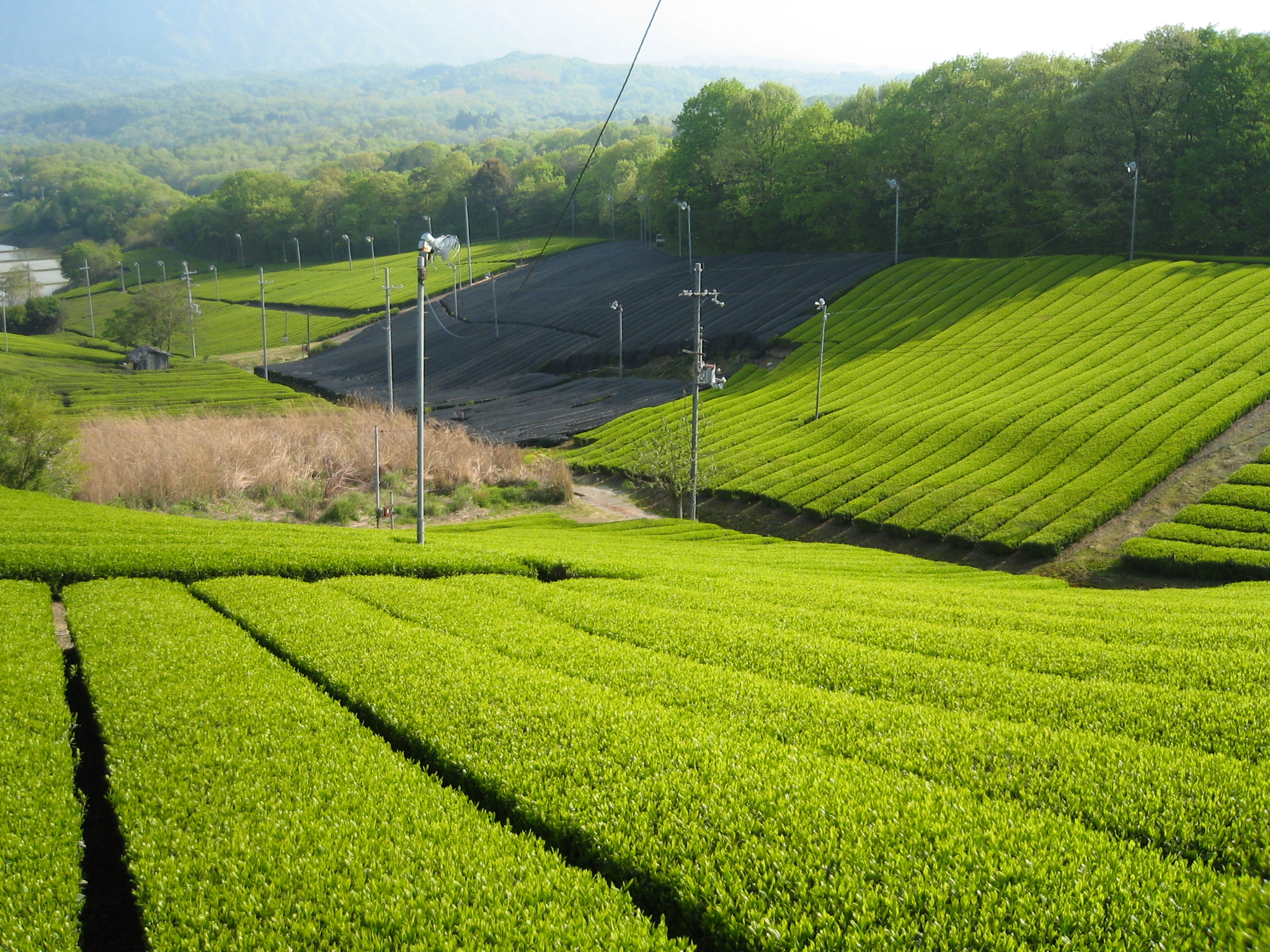
A green tea plantation in Minamiyamashiro, Kyoto

Uji tea (宇治茶, Uji-cha) is a common name for all Japanese green tea produced from Uji, Kyoto. The three main types of Uji tea are Matcha, Sencha and Gyokuro. It is believed that Japanese tea originated with the introduction of drinking customs from Tang dynasty China during the Heian period, while the intensive cultivation of tea plants from seeds began at the Toganoo tea garden. These seeds were later spread to Uji, which became the site to produce the highest quality of tea leaf in Japan.

Uji has witnessed the diversification of green tea. The development of the shaded cultivation method known as Ōishita saibai in Uji during the 15th or 16th century led to the birth of modern-day matcha. Beginning from the high-grade matcha, which was only accessible by the nobles, Sencha was invented in the 18th century to fulfil the need of common people. The combination of these two tea production techniques produced gyokuro. The increasing popularity of Uji tea is deeply connected with the success of tea ceremonies, including Tōcha, Chanoyu and Senchadō.

== History of Uji tea ==
=== First record of tea ===
During 804AD, a Japanese Buddhist monk named Kukai Hoken Hyu travelled to the Tang dynasty of China for two years. Upon return, he brought back books and calligraphy and began to propagate Buddhist teaching in Japanese society. Kukai had requested to present his discoveries to Emperor Saga. It was recorded that Emperor Saga was drinking chanoyu while reading through the books. As chanoyu means hot tea, this became the first record of tea drinking in Japan history.

=== The finest Uji tea ===
It is debatable whether tea is native to Japan or introduced from abroad. Records show that tea leaf and tea seeds arrived in Japan at a different time. Tea seeds were introduced to Japan at around 1191 by a Zen priest called Myoan Eisai. These seeds were first spread at Toganoo, which was the place where honcha (real tea) was known to be produced initially. Toganoo tea was regarded as the best tea in the realm at around 1350.

Eisai also shared the tea seeds with his friend, Myoe Shonin, who started tea plantation in Uji. Uji tea was then rated as the second best tea in 1383. However, this ranking was being questioned in 1460 as a shogun named Ashikaga Yoshimasa asked, "Uji [tea] during this age has recently been the favourite brand [of the shogun]. Even though it has been said that Toganoo [tea] has declined [in favor], just as in the saying, its reputation has not changed. Should it not also be highly regarded and not forgotten?" With the support from Yoshimasa and his followers, Uji tea soon shared the top spot with Toganoo tea.

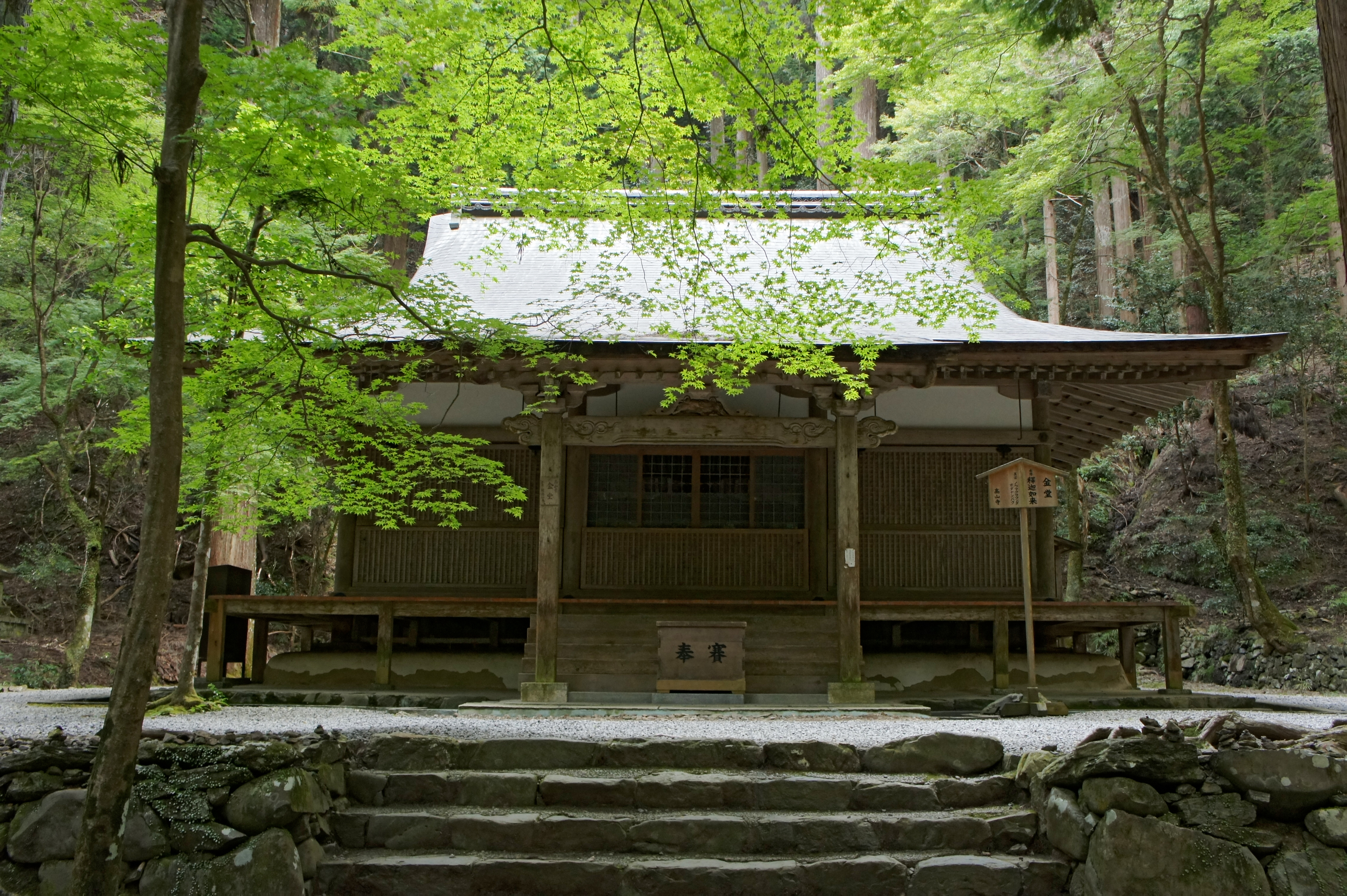
Kozanji Temple in Kyoto

Since then, the frequency of Uji tea appearing in trade and gift increased. By the end of 1500s, Uji tea replaced Toganoo to produce honcha. This was promoted by three factors. Firstly, tea plantation in Toganoo was managed by a monk from Kōzanji temple. However, the monk died after giving a cleric from Ninnaji temple loan of Toganoo tea fields without leaving any written notice. This led to a huge dispute over the ownership of tea field, causing confusion in the plantation and trading of tea.

Secondly, consumption of Uji tea continued to popularize in Japan despite the issue in Toganoo. This was contributed by the development of tea ceremonies which regard tea drinking as a form of art. The development of unique tea culture was promoted by Murata Jukō, Takeno Jōō, and Sen Rikyū. Thereupon, demand for powdered green tea increased in Uji.

Thirdly, tea farmers from Uji invented an effective method for tea plantation known as the "roof-over method" or ōishita saibai. This method involved the use of grass, straw or reeds to build a roof above tea plants to prevent the penetration of sunlight. It inhibited the photosynthesis process, thus producing a sweeter tea. Additionally, the ōishita saibai method protected tea plants from insects and deleterious weather such as mists and frosts.

=== Tea plantation in Uji ===
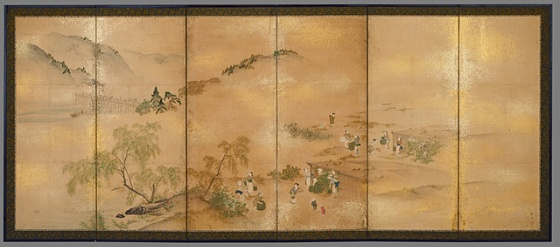
Tea Picking at Uji

Uji is regarded as a benchmark for high-quality tea leaves. This is due to a combination of different factors, including soil quality, misty climate, optimal soil quality, sloping hills and the fact that Obuku never frosts even during winter. Tea produced from Uji are often presented to the imperial family and used in tea ceremonies. Hence, many local farmers are still applying the traditional method of processing tea leaf instead of relying on machines. This knowledge is passed down from generation to generation to produce high-quality tea.

== Tea cultivation and processing technique ==
=== The Uji method ===
During the 16th century, a shading method called Ōishita Saibai was invented in Uji. This method became the origin of Tencha and Matcha. The production of high-quality matcha powder increased the reputation of Uji tea. In fact, a record of tea prices between 1413 and 1567 showed that over 100 transactions were made in Kyoto among 178 recorded deals even though Uji tea costs 500 coins per kilogram while a cup of tea costs 5-6 coins.

However, there was a strict policy on the use of shading method which made Tencha and Matcha available only to higher class communities. Common people could only access to lower grade green tea like bancha.

Soen Nagatani, a tea farmer from Ujitawara who was troubled by the restriction on the use of Tana canopy wished to produce high-quality tea without the need to use the shading method. After 15 years of testing, he invented Sencha in 1738 which quickly spread throughout the country. Sencha is produced from the Uji Method (Aoseisenchahou), also known as the Uji-cha tea Hand Knead Tea Production Technique.

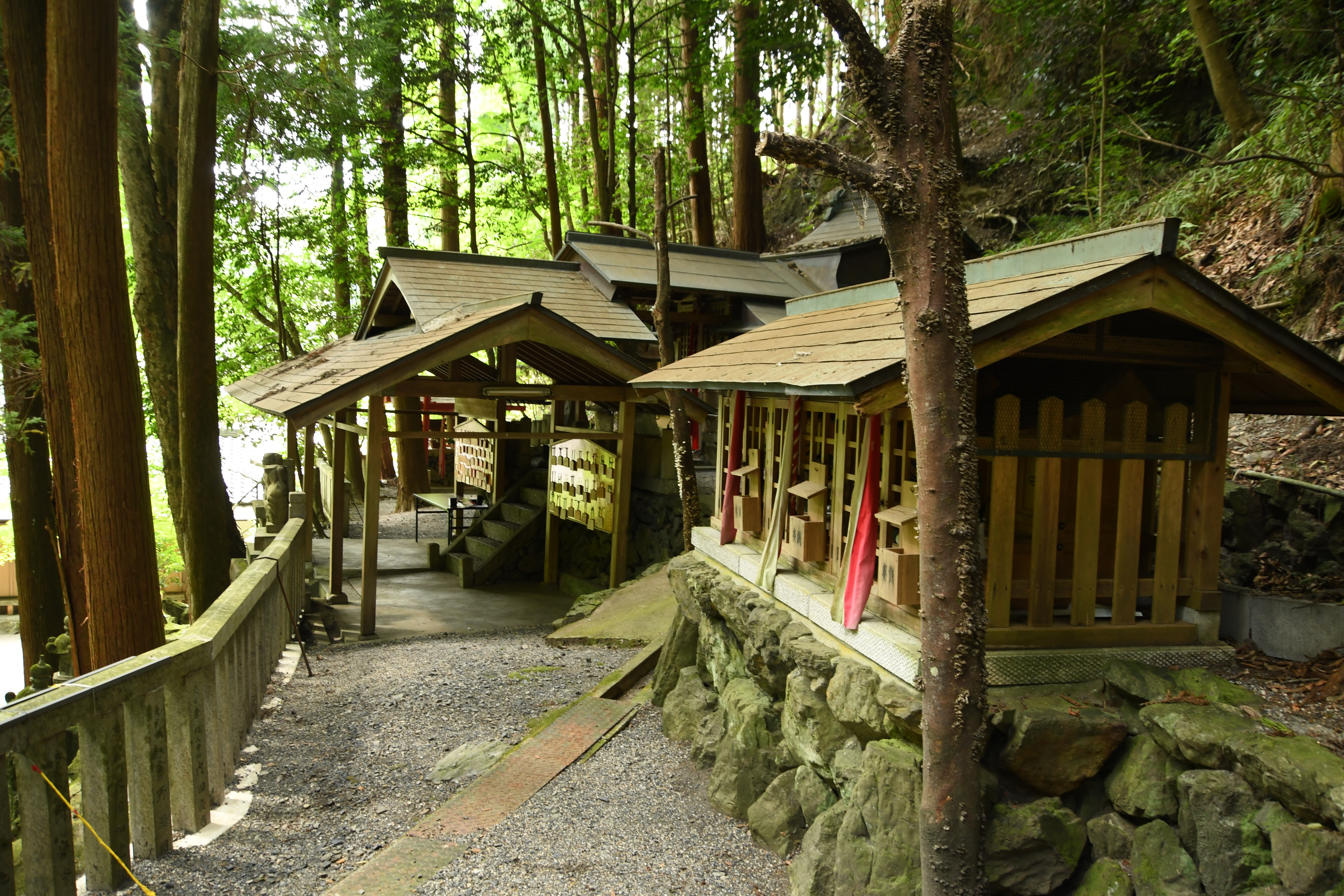
Chasomyo Shrine (茶宗明神社) in Yuyadani, Ujitawara, Kyoto

The Uji Method involves 10 main steps:

1. Steaming
2. Tea Cutting
3. Yokomakuri (rolling of tea leaves)
4. Tamatoki (Breaking chunks of tea leaves)
5. Nakaage (Cooling of tea leaves)
6. Chazoroe (Rubbing and rolling of tea leaves into long twisted shape)
7. Denguri (Shaping of tea leaves into round shape)
8. Itazuri (Kneading of tea leaves into thin round shape)
9. Drying
10. Finishe (Kneading tea leaves into thin and long shape)

Soen Nagatani shared his knowledge with other tea farmers who were willing to learn. His house and belongings were preserved and transformed into a museum and a temple called Chasomyo Shrine (茶宗明神社) was built. His invention of the Uji Method became the main method used in Japan for tea processing.

=== Transformation of regional production ===
The success of Uji tea cultivation and processing techniques were sought by tea farmers from other villages. The primitive technique of sun-drying tea leaves was commonly used in Shimosa and Hitachi. Although this method could guarantee the quality of tea leaves produced, but only small quantities of tea leaves were produced every year. This placed the tea farmers at a disadvantage as they were unable to compete with major tea markets from other parts of Japan with the commercialization of agricultural in the mid-eighteenth century.

To revive the local tea markets, Shichirobei of Nagatsura village had invited elite tea farmers from Uji to improve their production yield. This was then followed by Nakayama Monotari of Heta village, Nomura Saheiji of Yamazaki village and Sakurai Denzaburo of nearby Nagaido village. The growing tea industry in Japan made tea to be one of the major export items in 1859. In fact, tea trading in 1867 was 18 times greater than 1859, with around 7 million pounds of tea being exported in 1867. Tea agriculture in Japan was also observed to expand by 66% in 1883 in only 10 years. Many lands in the Yamachiro area of Kyoto were cleared for tea growing, such as Wazuka Town and Minami Yamashiro Village.

== Main types of Uji tea ==
=== Matcha ===
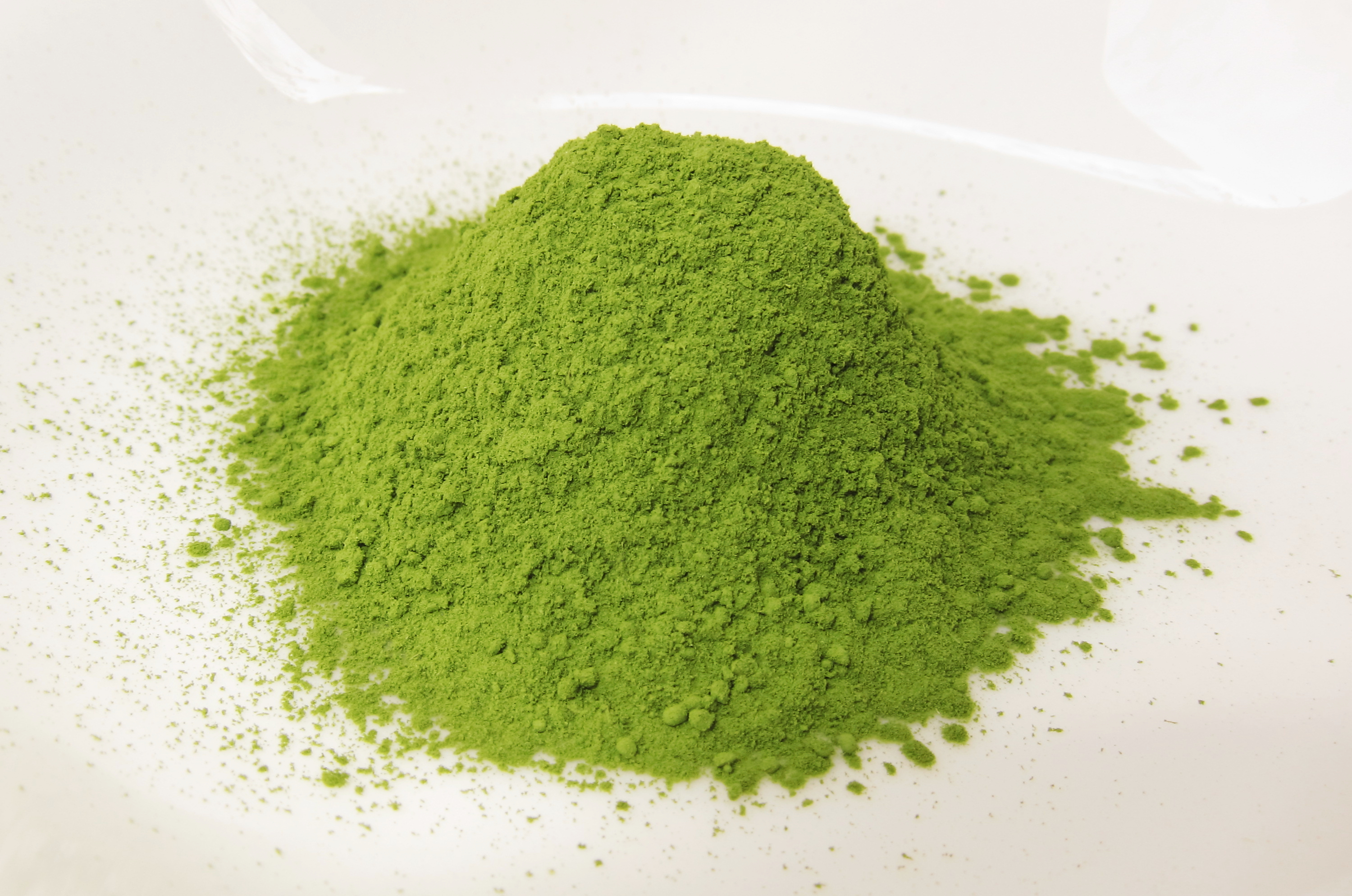
Matcha

Matcha (high-grade tea) is the most widely known type of Japanese tea. The first batch of matcha powder was known to be produced from Uji in the 16th century by the Ōishita Saibai method. It is renowned for its use in the tea ceremony, Chanoyu by Sen no Rikyu. Matcha which presents a darker colour has a greater taste of astringency.

Matcha is planted with a special shading method called Ōishita Saibai. The processing of matcha requires the removal of leaf vein and fine stems. This allows matcha to be completely soluble in water in its powdered form.

=== Sencha ===
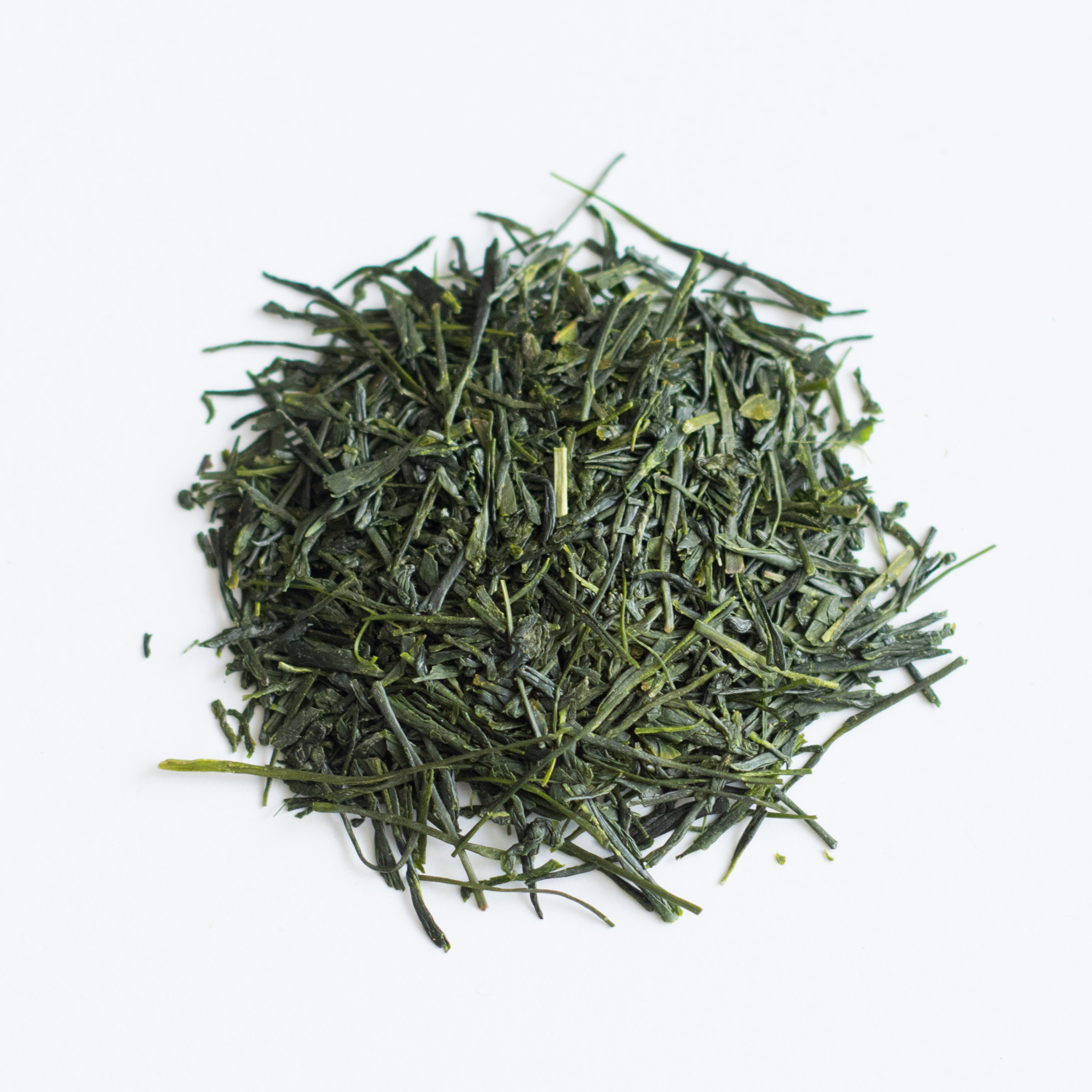
Uji lightly steamed sencha

Sencha (middle-grade tea) is the most popular tea in Japan that accounts for more than 80% of total tea production. It is produced by the Uji Method. Tea leaves are picked from areas with direct sunlight and will undergo steaming and rolling afterwards. It has a unique taste of sweetness with slight astringency.

Sencha is rich in vitamins and popular among women as a teatime drink.

=== Gyokuro ===
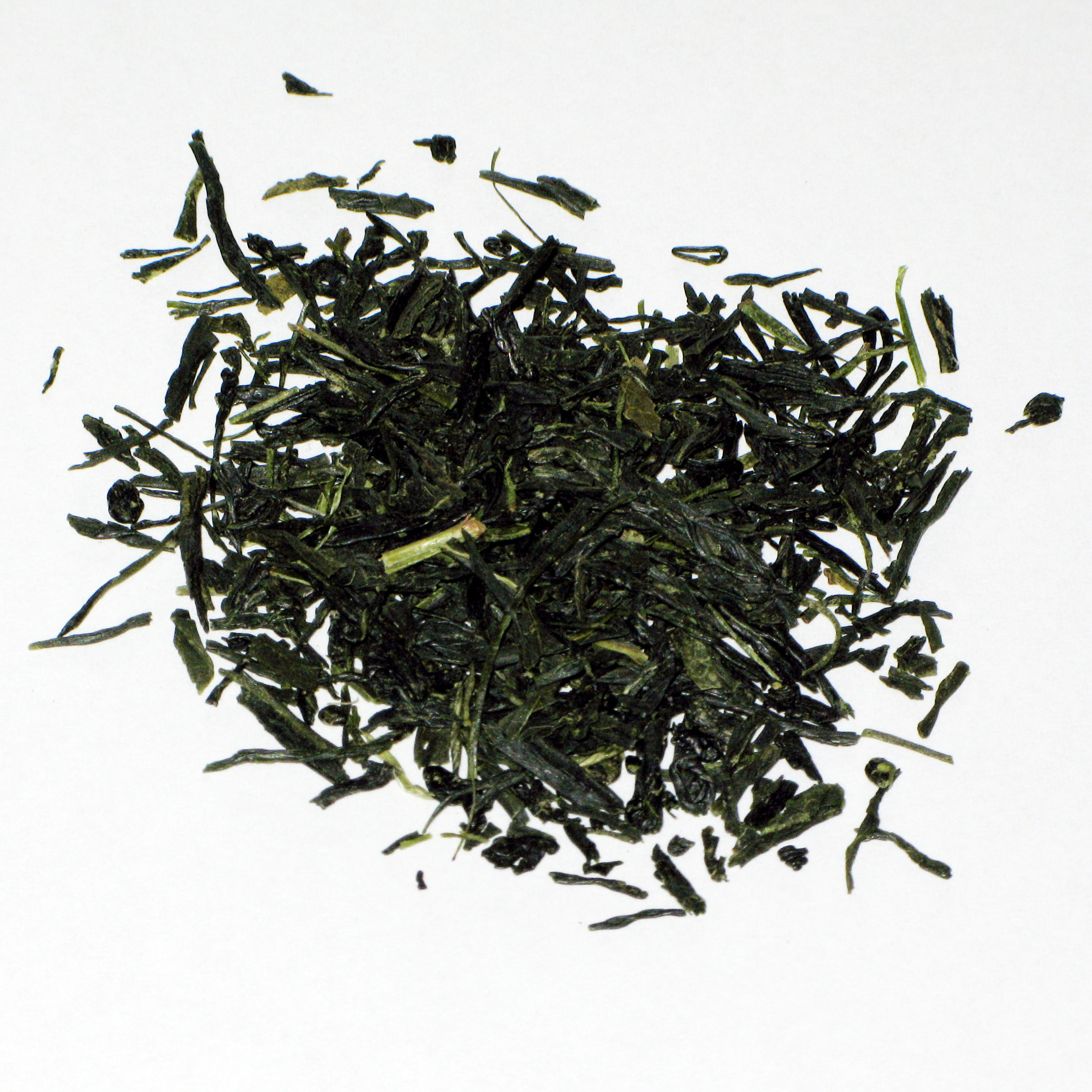
Gyokuro

Gyokuro is a high-grade tea with a medicinal purpose in treating fatigue. It was invented in the 19th century with a combination of Ōishita Saibai method and Uji method. The tea leaves are harvested from a shaded region like matcha and are steamed and rolled like sencha.

Gyokuro contains much chlorophyll and presents a dark green colour after drying. The high levels of caffeine and chlorophyll aid in the stimulation of brain activity and tissue growth.

== Tea ceremony ==
Uji tea is deeply connected with the daily lives of Japanese. Tea-drinking culture in Uji has a strong association with the creation and development of many tea ceremonies. A proper tea ceremony must be held in a carefully designed chashitsu (tearoom) with a teishu (experienced tea master).

Uji with a long history of tea culture has many teahouses that provide tea ceremony experience, including Taihoan, Nakamura Tokichi Honten, Fukujuen Ujicha Kobo, Mitsuboshien Kambayashi Honten and Takumi no Yakata.

=== Tocha (tea contest) ===
As tea gained higher popularity, Japanese came up with a tasting tea contest known as tocha to differentiate between honcha and hicha (non-tea) during the Nanbokucho period. When tocha was first introduced, honcha was represented by Toganoo tea whereas hicha described tea produced from elsewhere. However, the flourish of Uji tea quickly replaced Toganoo tea and became honcha.

Tocha expanded and extended to other areas of Japan as the wagers increased, along with the popularity of Uji tea. It was then described as 'tea affairs of excess or extravagance'. Due to this reason, tocha was banned in Japanese society and it slowly faded out from the population.

=== Chanoyu ===
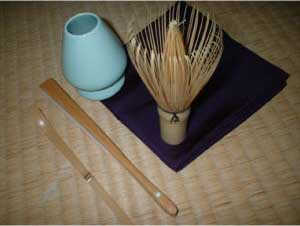
Tea utensils used in chanoyu

In the 16th century, the creation of Chanoyu ('the way of tea') was inspired by a Zen Buddhist monk, Sen no Rikyu, also known as the Tea Master. He combined tea culture in rituals and established a connection with religious and philosophical ideas. Chanoyu is not just tea drinking, but a combination of tea, art and aesthetics, an expression of wabi. It is regarded as a spiritual event and matcha is used which symbolizes purity.

The development of Chanoyu was promoted by the discovery of Ōishita Saibai method in the 16th century. The matcha produced was strong in flavour and in the colour of dark green. Sen no Rikyu incorporated the best tea leaves produced in Japan into Chanoyu, which directly contributed to the success of Chanoyu.

The crucial part of chanoyu is the etiquette of drinking matcha. It is believed that drinking matcha with the proper posture, with back straight, will enhance the overall experience. When serving matcha, teishu will place the teacup on the left palm and rotate the teacup to be facing the guest. The guest receives the teacup and places it on the left palm with the right hand along with the cup. The teacup must be rotated clockwise again to avoid drinking from the front of the teacup. The guest will then finish a cup of matcha in exactly three and a half sips.

=== Senchadō ===
Senchadō was developed by a Chinese monk named Ingen Ryūki in the 17th century. Senchadō means 'the way of sencha', which describes the way to prepare loose tea leaves such as sencha and gyokuro.

The term 'sencha' was originally used to describe the way of simmering loose tea leaf into boiling water for consumption. This method was commonly seen in China but less common in Japan with the high popularity of powdered tea. Senchadō became popularized only by 18th century when Baisaō, the pupil of Ingen spread Senchadō around Japan. It was also during the 18th century which Sencha was invented by Soen Nagatani and the term 'Sencha' had changed from describing the preparation of loose tea leaf to become a type of green tea that is steamed and dried.

== Registration as an UNESCO World Heritage Site ==
Uji tea has 700 years of history in the Yamashiro area of Kyoto. It is the origin of the Ōishita Saibai method and the Uji method used on flat land and slopped hills. This area also assembles tea factories for the processing of aracha tea, tea wholesalers as well as Gogumi which gathers tea leaves produce from different areas at different time. According to Kyoto Prefecture, these are the assets representing Uji tea cultural landscapes, which evolve continuously in the last 700 years.

The evolution is observable with the production of new teas, including matcha, sencha and gyokuro. These green teas support Japanese tea-drinking cultures such as chanoyu and senchadō. Therefore, the Kyoto Prefecture is working to register Uji landscape as an UNESCO World Heritage Site.
