= Wabi-cha =

Japanese tea ceremony

Wabi-cha (わび茶; 侘茶; 侘び茶), is a style of Japanese tea ceremony particularly associated with Sen no Rikyū, Takeno Jōō and its originator Murata Jukō. Wabi-cha emphasizes simplicity. The term came into use in the Edo period, prior to which it was known as wabi-suki (侘数寄), suki meaning "artistic inclination", and "wabi" meaning 'forlorn'.

== History ==
By the latter years of the Muromachi period, tea ceremony had become widespread, with a preference for expensive wares of Chinese origin known as karamono. Wabi-cha evolved as part of a movement to appreciate local wares and simpler styles.

Generally, three main figures are credited with the development of the wabi-cha aesthetic form of chanoyu: first, Murata Jukō; then, Takeno Jōō; and finally, Sen no Rikyū.

Rikyū cited two poems from the Shin Kokin Wakashū poetry anthology of the early thirteenth century, as exemplifying his wabi aesthetic. One, a favorite of Takeno Jōō's, is by Fujiwara no Teika (1162–1241):

Casting wide my gaze,
Neither flowers
Nor scarlet leaves:
A bayside hovel of reeds
In the autumn dusk.

The other, in which Rikyū found particular appeal, is by Fujiwara Ietaka (1158–1237):

Show them who wait
Only for flowers
There in the mountain villages:
Grass peeks through the snow,
And with it, spring.

At the core of Rikyū's aesthetic was the tea room smaller than 4.5 tatami mats. Rikyū sought to mold chanoyu into a spiritual path. His radical simplification of the tea-room interior, his reduction of space to the bare minimum needed for "a sitting", was the most practical way of focusing tea practice on the communion of host and guests. This is seen in the one extant tea house attributed to his design, the tea house called Taian (待庵), located at Myōkian temple in Yamazaki, Kyoto, which has been designated by the Japanese government as a National Treasure (kokuhō). His achievement represents the culmination of the wabi aesthetic born of the contemplative awareness of the relationship between people and things. With Rikyū, wabi took on its most profound and paradoxical meaning: a purified taste in material things as a medium for human interaction transcending materialism.

Rikyū also began designing his own tea wares, sometimes having them made by local craftsmen. Raku ware tea bowls originated from Rikyū having the tile maker named Raku Chōjirō create tea bowls for him. He even created his own objects to use in the tea room, including flower containers made of bamboo he cut himself.

== Modern wabi-cha ==
Ironically, in modern times achieving the aura of rustic simplicity demanded by wabi-cha can be an expensive endeavour. Even the simple, cheap items used by Rikyū and his followers have gained both status and value: authentic Raku tea bowls, for example, are among the most expensive available today, and among the most sought after. Similarly, creating the look of simplicity promoted by Rikyū for tea rooms can also be very expensive.
