= Imai Sōkun =

Japanese weapons merchant (1552–1627)

Imai Sōkun (今井 宗薫; 1552 – 25 May 1627) was a prominent weapons merchant in the Japanese port town of Sakai, and master of the Japanese tea ceremony. He was also known by the names Imai Hiratsuna and Imai Kanehisa.

Sōkun was the son of weapons merchant and tea master Imai Sōkyū, and carried on from his father in both capacities. He also followed his father as an advisor and tea master to Toyotomi Hideyoshi. Following Hideyoshi's death in 1598, he served Tokugawa Ieyasu, who named him a hatamoto and granted him an estate worth 1,300 koku. Sōkun also helped to organize the dispatch of red seal ships, trading ships formally authorized by the shogunate to trade with the Asian mainland.
