= Tsuda Sōgyū =

Japanese tea master (died 1591)

Tsuda Sōgyū (津田 宗及, died 1591) was a Japanese tea master.

== Early life ==
Tsuda Sōgyū belonged to the influential family of merchants of Sakai whose business name was Tennōjiya. Together with his father, Tsuda Sōtatsu, he built the Tennōjiya into one of the most prosperous business houses in Sakai.

== Connection with Nobunaga ==
A political tactic he used to build the family’s business was winning the favor of Oda Nobunaga, who was on the path to hegemony.

Around the year 1574, Sōgyu became one of the three merchant-class tea masters of Sakai to be in charge of chanoyu (Japanese tea ceremony) affairs for Nobunaga; a position referred to as chatō ("tea head"). The other two were Imai Sōkyū and Sen no Rikyū.

Sōgyū was very familiar with Akechi Mitsuhide, so after Nobunaga was killed by the hands of Mitsuhide during the year of 1582, Sōgyū's reputation was wounded. Even though this was true, Nobunaga's avenger and political successor, Toyotomi Hideyoshi, had all three of Nobunaga's chatō, including Sōgyū, serve him as his own men in charge of tea affairs. Sōgyū attended Hideyoshi's Grand Kitano Tea Ceremony in the year of 1587.

== Historical records ==
The Tennōjiya kaiki (天王寺屋会記) record of chanoyu gatherings compiled by three generations of the Tennōjiya mercantile house – Sōgyū's father, Sōtatsu; Sōgyū himself; and Sōgyū's son and heir, Sōbon – is considered one of the most valuable historical resources for learning about the chanoyu of those days.

Of the known instances of Sen no Rikyū's participation in chanoyu, Tsuda Sōgyū appears more frequently than any other individual as having shared the time there with Rikyū.
