= Imai Sōkyū =

16th-century Japanese merchant

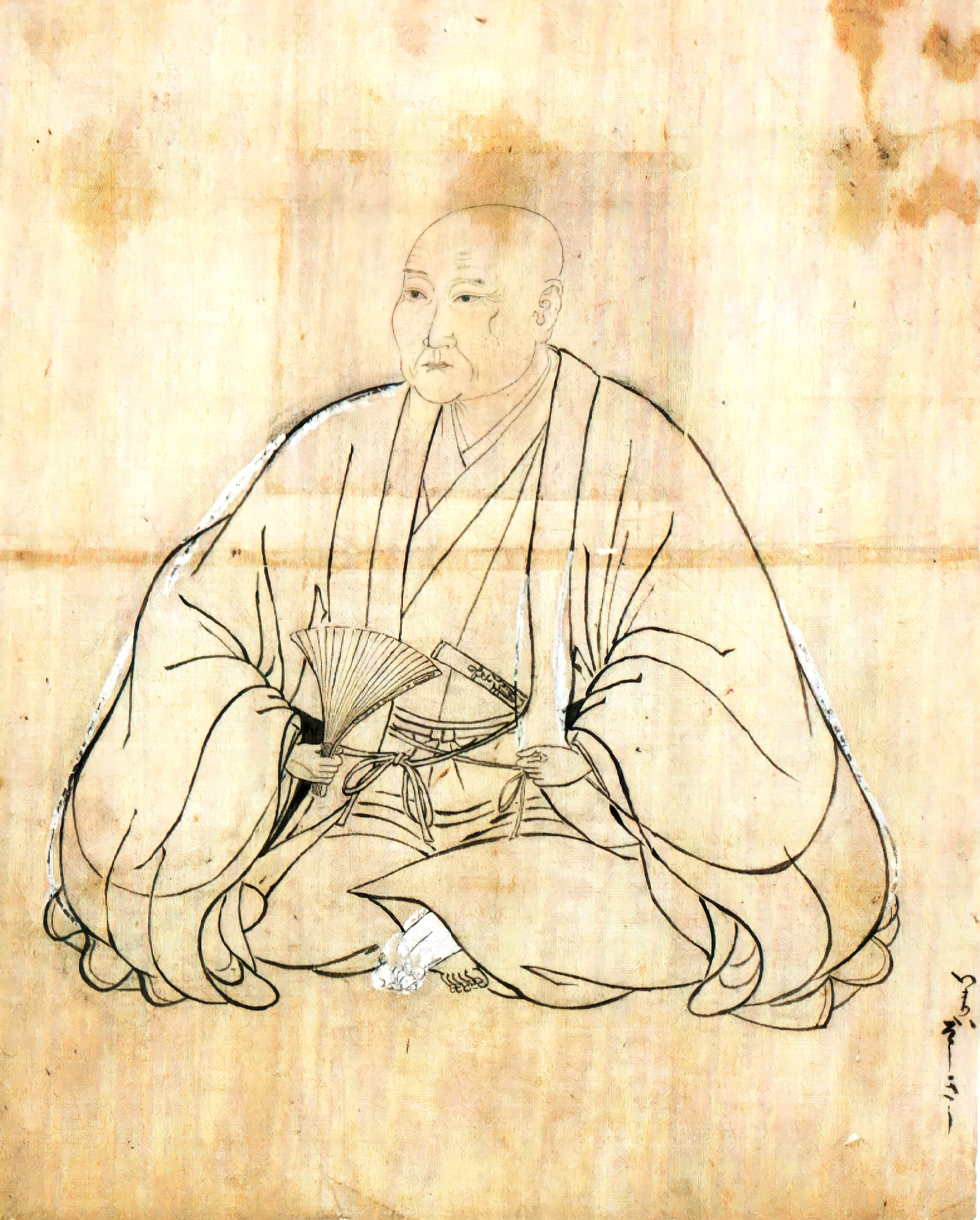

Imai Sōkyū (今井 宗久; 1520 – 31 August 1593) was a 16th century merchant in the Japanese port town of Sakai, and a master of the tea ceremony. His yagō was Naya.

== Biography ==
A relative of the Amago and Sasaki samurai clans, Sōkyū originally came from Yamato Province. After settling in Sakai, he studied the tea ceremony under Takeno Jōō, eventually marrying Jōō's daughter and inheriting his teawares and lineage as a tea master. In his business, Sōkyū traded primarily in firearms and ammunition. Around 1554, after donating a large sum to the Daitoku-ji, he organized a shake-up in the local merchant circles by which he climbed into a position of considerable influence, and became a member of the city's leadership council.

He traveled to the capital in 1568, where he met with warlord Oda Nobunaga, and presented him with some tea accoutrements which had belonged to earlier masters. He thus earned Nobunaga's favor, and was granted a noble title. Shortly afterwards, when Nobunaga sought to lay claim to Sakai, many members of the council debated seeking defense from the Miyoshi clan, but Sōkyū was among those who suggested that the city submit. He acted as mediator to arrange the peaceful submission of the city, and was rewarded by Nobunaga with a lucrative commission to manufacture firearms for the Oda clan, and a post as a local magistrate. Sōkyū came to be responsible for tax collection in the outskirts of the city, and for pass-port applications and related matters. He was also assigned some jurisdiction over the nearby Tajima silver mine, and over the blacksmiths and metallurgists of the area, from whom he gathered materials to produce firearms and fireworks.

Afterwards Sōkyū instructed Nobunaga in the ways of tea ceremony, also winning over the favor of Toyotomi Hideyoshi. Sōkyū was present during the Grand Kitano Tea Ceremony of 1587, and served as one of Hideyoshi's three tea masters, alongside Sen no Rikyū and Tsuda Sōgyū. The same year, he helped prepare lacquer for a massive wooden statue of the Buddha which Hideyoshi saw constructed.

Sōkyū passed on his business and his official post to his son, Imai Sōkun, who would continue his father's legacy as tea master and advisor to Hideyoshi, and later to Tokugawa Ieyasu. Sōkyū died in 1593, at the age of 73, leaving a number of books of memoirs and records.

The Ōbaian, a teahouse related to him, still exists in Sakai's Daisen Park. Sōkyū is buried at the Rinkō-ji in Sakai.
