= Grand Kitano Tea Ceremony =

Japanese tea ceremony event

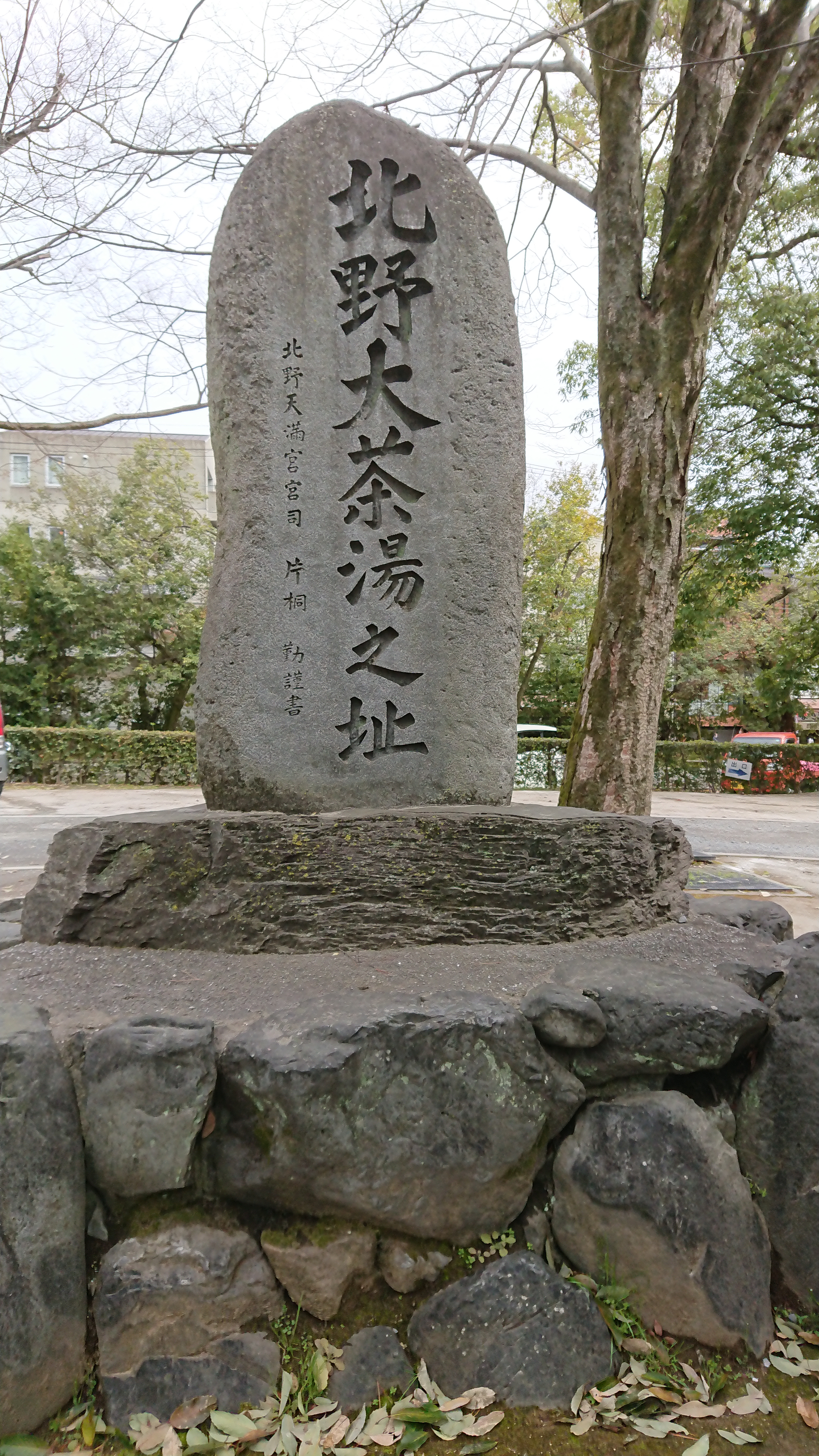
Grand Kitano Tea Gathering monument at Kitano Tenmangu shrine, Kyoto

The Grand Kitano Tea Ceremony (Japanese: 北野大茶湯, Hepburn: Kitano ōchanoyu), also known in English as the Grand Kitano Tea Gathering, was a large Japanese tea ceremony event that was hosted by the regent and chancellor Toyotomi Hideyoshi at Kitano Tenmangū shrine in Kyoto on the first day of the tenth month in the year Tenshō 15 (1587). Japanese cultural historians view it as a major cultural event of the Momoyama period. Louise Cort points out these three reasons: The event was "a key move in Hideyoshi's strategy to prove his cultural legitimacy; a turning point in the development of chanoyu style and theory; and a crisis in the personal relationship between its chief designers, two of the most influential figures of the Momoyama period, Hideyoshi and Sen no Rikyū".

== Background ==
Toyotomi Hideyoshi, a warrior of humble background who rose to eventually become the national ruler, recognized cultural knowledge to be as important an attribute of leadership as military might and took up the practice of chanoyu as a means of demonstrating his cultivation. This had been the same with aspiring rulers before him, such as Oda Nobunaga in particular, whom Hideyoshi succeeded in the campaign to reunify the country after the fall of the Ashikaga shogunate. To further enhance their image as legitimate rulers, Nobunaga and Hideyoshi after him sought to acquire works of art that had belonged to the Ashikaga shōguns. Nobunaga acquired some of those treasures as tokens of allegiance from warlords and merchants with whom he had formed political alliances. Others he ordered confiscated from their owners, often men whom he had defeated on the battlefield. Nobunaga furthermore made use of chanoyu as his "way of politics" (chanoyu goseidō) in his relationships with his military commanders. This was by prohibiting them from practicing chanoyu without his permission, and giving them esteemed art works for use in chanoyu as rewards for distinguished service.

After the dramatic death of Nobunaga in the summer of 1582 at Honnō-ji temple, Kyoto, Hideyoshi within days had seized political initiative. He continued the course set by Nobunaga and, with respect to chanoyu, he took possession of Nobunaga's cherished art works for chanoyu use, symbols of his new wealth and culture. Later that year, he announced to Nobunaga's three chief chanoyu advisors -- Rikyū, Tsuda Sōgyū, and Imai Sōkyū -- his intention of enlisting them in his own service.

The Grand Kitano Tea Gathering was one of the many extravaganzas staged by Hideyoshi as part of his quest for legitimacy through cultural authority. In 1583, he marked the opening of his newly completed Osaka Castle with a volley of ceremonies that lasted days and brought together both tea men and warlords. The visiting generals at that event followed custom by presenting him with art works for chanoyu use. On the 5th day of the 3rd month in 1585, he held a mammoth event at Daitoku-ji, heartland of Zen power in the capital and training ground for many men who became lay monks as part of their chanoyu practice. The participants included twenty-five chanoyu practitioners from Sakai, fifty merchants from Kyoto, the monks of the temple, and Hideyoshi's commanders and allies. As the focal point of the event, Hideyoshi set up a display of his collection within the abbot's quarters of Sōken-in, the subtemple which he himself had had built to commemorate Nobunaga's family. In the 5th month of 1587, Hideyoshi was victorious in his campaign against one of his last undefeated opponents, Shimazu Yoshihisa, who had dominated most of Kyūshū. Hideyoshi had the support of the wealthy merchant, Kamiya Sōtan, and other prominent merchants in the port city of Hakata, and after his victory on the battlefield, he returned to Hakata, where he celebrated with a round of tea gatherings hosted by those influential merchants. The site for these tea gatherings was the seaside pine grove at Hakozaki. Then, just two weeks after his triumphant arrival back in Osaka on the 14th day of the 7th month of that same year, 1587, the signboards went up about the Grand Kitano Tea Gathering.

== Participants and scheme ==
Around the end of the 7th month (1587), the signboards announcing the event were erected in Kyoto, Sakai, Nara, and other sites where chanoyu practitioners were numerous. The Matsuya Kaiki (松屋会記) chanoyu records kept by the Matsuya Genzaburō family, who ran a lacquerware business in Nara and were very active in the world of chanoyu, includes a handwritten transcription of the signboard text. According to the copy of it in the collection of the Kyoto Mingei Museum, the signboard stated as follows:

- Item: In the Kitano grove, weather permitting, from the first day of the tenth month and continuing for ten days, His Lord, in connection with his presence at a Grand Chanoyu, will assemble every single one of his meibutsu (名物; famed items for chanoyu use)), in order to let chanoyu devotees view them.
- Item: All chanoyu devotees, including also warriors' attendants, townspeople, farmers, and those of lower station, regardless, should bring a kettle, a well bucket, a drinking bowl, and tea -- no offense will be taken if substituted by kogashi (powdered roasted rice) -- and take part.
- Item: As for the room (zashiki) [that each participant is to set up], since it will be in a pine grove, a floorspace of two tatami will be suitable. However, wabi people may simply spread mat-covers or rice-hull bags. Participants may arrange themselves as they please.
- Item: This invitation is not limited to Japan but extends to everyone who sets his heart on chanoyu (suki), even to people on the continent.
- Item: In order that he may show the treasures to participants from distant countries, His Lord is extending the duration so that it is not limited to the first day of the tenth month.
- Item: His Lord has made these arrangements for the benefit of wabi people. Any among such people who fail to attend will be prohibited hereafter from preparing even kogashi, and anyone who visits such a person will suffer the same punishment.
- Item: His Lord has declared that he will prepare tea personally for all wabi people, not only those attending from distant places.

About one month before the scheduled day that the grand event was to commence, Hideyoshi had word sent to members of the aristocracy in Kyoto, urging their participation in the event. He also had one of his three main men in charge of chanoyu matters, Tsuda Sōgyū, deliver a formal letter from him to the Hakata merchant Kamiya Sōtan, ordering him to come to Kyoto without fail and participate in the event, as he would be the only from Kyushu.

It is especially notable that this grand event was intended to be impartial to social rank or wealth, and, together with Hideyoshi's own chanoyu venue, venues hosted by the three great chanoyu masters in Hideyoshi's service, who all were of the influential merchant class in the politically crucial city of Sakai, were designed as the special attractions.

According to the Kanemi Kyōki (兼見卿記) diary kept by the nobleman Yoshida Kanemi, who was chief priest at Yoshida Shrine in Kyoto, the bamboo grove of Kitano Tenmangū shrine was packed with more than 800 tea houses and other spaces for preparing and serving tea by the 28th day of the ninth month, 1587. And it is estimated that altogether approximately 1,500-1,600 such tea venues had quickly been set up by the 30th of that month, the day before the event was to commence. Amongst the participants were Hideyoshi's three tea masters Sen no Rikyū, Tsuda Sōgyū, and Imai Sōkyū, as well as nobles and warriors. The set-up were various stations where each host accommodated very small to larger groups and prepared tea in front of them and served it. The Golden Tea Room was also set up in the gardens of the shrine.

Initially scheduled to be 10 days long, it was cut off by the regent after only one day for unknown reasons.

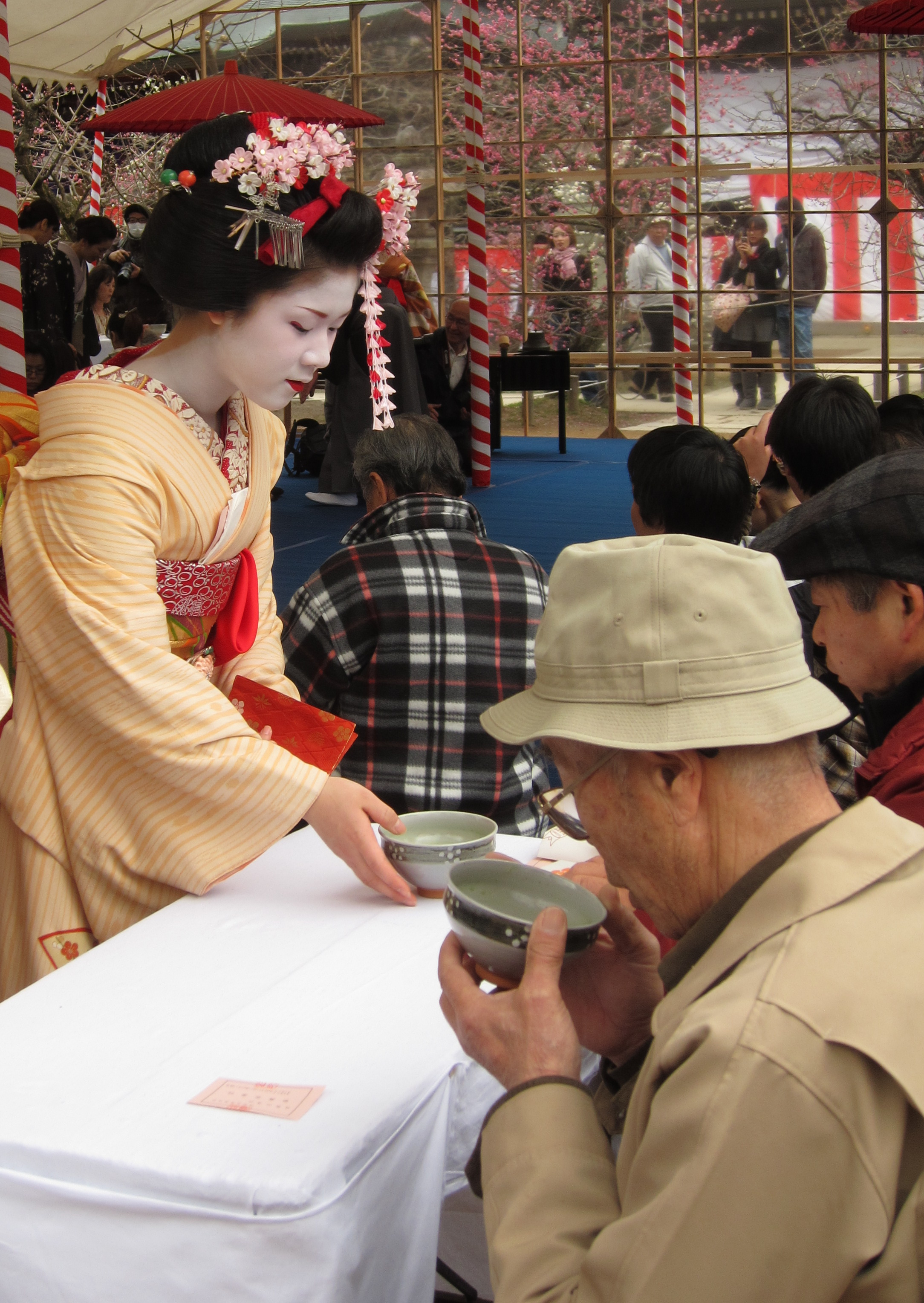
A maiko serving tea at the shrine's yearly plum blossom festival

Based on this historic event, the shrine organises every year the Plum Blossom Festival (梅花祭, baikasai), held on February 25, with a large offering of tea and wagashi to about 3,000 guests, served by geisha and maiko.

== In popular media ==
Hyouge Mono (へうげもの, Hyōge Mono; lit. "Jocular Fellow") is a Japanese manga written and illustrated by Yoshihiro Yamada. It was adapted into an anime series in 2011, and includes the Grand Kitano Tea Ceremony in its story.

== Recommended reading ==
- Cort, Louise. "The Grand Kitano Tea Gathering," Chanoyu Quarterly no. 31, pp. 15–44. (Urasenke Foundation, Kyoto, 1982: ISSN 0009-1537)
