= Murata Jukō =

Founder of the Japanese tea ceremony

- 村田珠光
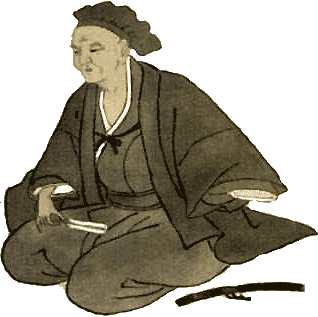
- Murata Jukō
- Born: 1423
- Died: 1502 (aged 78–79)
- Other name: Murata Shukō
- Known for: developing the Japanese tea ceremony
- Notable work: Letter of the Heart

Murata Jukō (村田珠光; 1423–1502) is known in Japanese cultural history as the founder of the Japanese tea ceremony, in that he was the early developer of the wabi-cha style of tea enjoyment employing native Japanese implements. His name may also be pronounced Murata Shukō.

== Biography ==
He was born in Nara; some accounts refer to his father as a blind biwa player, although it is generally assumed that he was from the mercantile class. At an early age, he became an attendant at Shōmyōji, a Buddhist temple of the Jōdo sect in Nara. During his youth, Jukō encountered the boisterous tocha gatherings of tea connoisseurs; although these held no appeal for him, he became interested in tea as a stimulant to keep him awake during his studies. His interest in tea took him to Kyoto, where he learned about the aristocratic practice of the tea ceremony from Nōami. It is recorded in the Record of Yamanoue Sōji that Jukō was employed by the shōgun Ashikaga Yoshimasa as a tea master at the Ginkaku-ji; however, this is unlikely to be true. Jukō also studied Zen under the priest Ikkyū Sōjun. It was Ikkyū's teaching that "the Buddha dharma is also in the Way of Tea" which inspired Jukō's creation of the tea ceremony. Ikkyū presented Jukō with a piece of calligraphy by Yuan Wu (a noted Chinese master of Zen) as a certificate of his enlightenment.

== Philosophy ==
Jukō set out most of his key theories on the tea ceremony in a letter to his student Furuichi Chōin of around 1488, a document now known as the Kokoro no fumi (心の文; "Letter of the heart"). It came into the possession of the Matsuya family, and was preserved for posterity; Sen no Rikyū praised it highly. As well as being an exposition of practice, the Kokoro no fumi has been explained as an attempt to establish Japan's merchant class within the field of tea, emphasising as it does the use of Japanese ceramics alongside imported Chinese ones. Jukō made extensive use of Japanese tea utensils, having a particular fondness for unglazed stoneware from the Bizen and Shigaraki schools. However, his style did not prohibit the use of the Chinese ware previously in vogue; the Kokoro no fumi in fact contains several injunctions to "harmonize Japanese and Chinese tastes". For Jukō, excessive concern with the imperfections and rustic aesthetic of Japanese utensils was as bad as a preoccupation with the regular forms and perfect glazes of Chinese ceramics. He argued that beginners in the tea ceremony should start by obtaining Chinese pieces in order to fully appreciate subsequent Japanese purchases.

Jukō stressed four values in his tea ceremony: kin, a form of humble reverence; kei, a respect for the food and drink; sei, purity of both body and spirit; and jaku, a Buddhist concept denoting calmness and freedom from desire. He developed the yojohan (four-and-a-half mat teahouse) that was later to become the standard design under Rikyū, changing the tokonoma and creating a more spiritual environment for the ceremony. In doing so, he attempted to incorporate the aesthetic concepts of hie (chill) and kare (withered) from renga poetry into the tea ceremony; Jukō was a master of the renga literary form. These qualities, were, he felt, expressed in the Japanese bowls and jars that he used.

Takeno Jō'ō studied under students of Jukō and continued the trend towards simplicity and minimalism in the tea ceremony. Jōō was the teacher of Sen no Rikyū.
