= Tōcha =

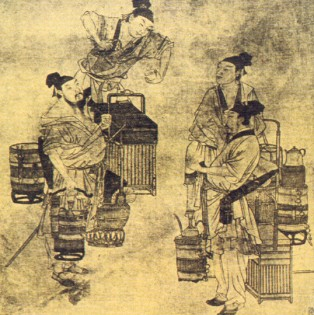
Image of doucha (鬥茶圖) by Zhao Mengfu, Yuan Dynasty

Tōcha (闘茶) is a Japanese pastime based on the identification of different types of tea. The custom originated in China where it is known as Doucha (闘茶) during the Tang dynasty, before spreading to Japan in the Kamakura period. However, whereas Chinese tea-tastings concentrated on assessing the quality of the various teas offered, tōcha became a friendly contest in which players would taste a number of cups of tea and attempt to guess the region from which the tea originated. Originally the goal was to distinguish the high-quality tea of Kyoto no togano (京都栂尾) from other kinds, but as connoisseurship developed, the goal became the correct identification of the tea's place of origin. The contest eventually attained a standardised formal procedure known as "four kinds and ten cups", in which participants tasted three cups each of three different teas and a single cup of a fourth variety. Prizes, including silks, weapons, gold and jewellery, were awarded for successful guesses, which gave tōcha participants a reputation for excess and extravagance (basara).

Large quantities of tea could be consumed at such gatherings (usually ten or fifty cups, hence the alternative names juppukucha ("ten cups of tea") and gojuppukucha ("fifty cups of tea") for the contest). Alcohol was often drunk as well.

It was held in a room known as a kissa-no-tei. The host of the event was called the teishu, a term which is still in use in modern tea-gatherings. Tea bowls or cups were laid out for the guests with the powdered tea already inside; once the guests were seated an attendant would add hot water and whisk the tea to prepare it.

The kōdō incense-matching contest was developed from tōcha by the daimyō Sasaki Takauji, who was noted for his tea-gatherings. Tōcha also inspired the cha kabuki form of the Japanese tea ceremony. In some respects, tōcha can be regarded as the stepping stone between the Zen Buddhist use of tea to prevent drowsiness and the secular tea ceremony, since it first popularised the drinking of tea outside of monasteries. Eventually, Murata Jukō developed the format of the tea ceremony from the more informal tōcha gatherings.

Tōcha gatherings could often be rowdy, boisterous affairs, akin to gambling contests. As a result, the activity was banned (with little effect on its popularity) by Ashikaga Takauji in the fourteenth century.
