= Japanese tea ceremony =

Traditional Japanese ceremony

The kanji characters for chadō, the 'Way of Tea'. While known in the Western world as the "tea ceremony", in the original Japanese fabric and context, the practice of tea can be more accurately described as "Teaism."

The Japanese tea ceremony is a cultural activity known as sadō/chadō (茶道, 'the way of tea') or chanoyu (茶の湯, 'hot water for tea'). The ceremony focuses on the presentation and serving of matcha (抹茶), powdered green tea; this procedure is called temae (点前). Much less commonly, Japanese tea practice uses leaf tea, primarily sencha. This practice is known as senchadō (煎茶道, 'the way of sencha').

In Japanese, there is a term, Sadō or Chadō, which means "tea way" and emphasizes the Tao (道). The English term Teaism was coined by Okakura Kakuzō to describe the unique worldview associated with the Japanese way of tea, rather than focusing solely on its presentation, which was initially perceived by some Western observers as ceremonial.

In the 1500s, Sen no Rikyū revolutionized Japanese tea culture. He played a key role in developing what is now known as the Japanese tea ceremony and elevated it to the status of an art form. He redefined the rules of the tea house, tea garden, utensils, and procedures of the tea ceremony with his own interpretation. He also introduced a much smaller chashitsu (tea house) and rustic, distorted ceramic tea bowls specifically for the tea ceremony, and emphasized the tea ceremony based on the aesthetic of wabi.

Sen no Rikyū's great-grandchildren founded the Omotesenke, Urasenke, and Mushakōjisenke schools of tea ceremony. As a result, the tea ceremony spread not only to daimyo (feudal lords) and the samurai class but also to the general public, which led to the establishment of various tea ceremony schools that continue to this day.

Zen Buddhism and Shinto has greatly influenced the culture of Japanese tea. For example, the practice of purifying one's hands and mouth before practicing the tea ceremony is influenced by the Shinto purification ritual of misogi. The architectural style of the chashitsu and the gate that serves as the boundary between the tea garden and the secular world has been influenced by Shinto shrine architecture and the torii (shrine gate). Buddhists used tea to prevent drowsiness during long meditations.

Tea gatherings are classified as either an informal tea gathering, chakai (茶会, 'tea gathering'), or a formal tea gathering, chaji (茶事, 'tea event'). A chakai is a relatively simple course of hospitality that includes wagashi (confections), thin tea, and perhaps a light meal. A chaji is a much more formal gathering, usually including a full-course kaiseki meal followed by confections, thick tea, and thin tea. A chaji may last up to four hours.

== History ==
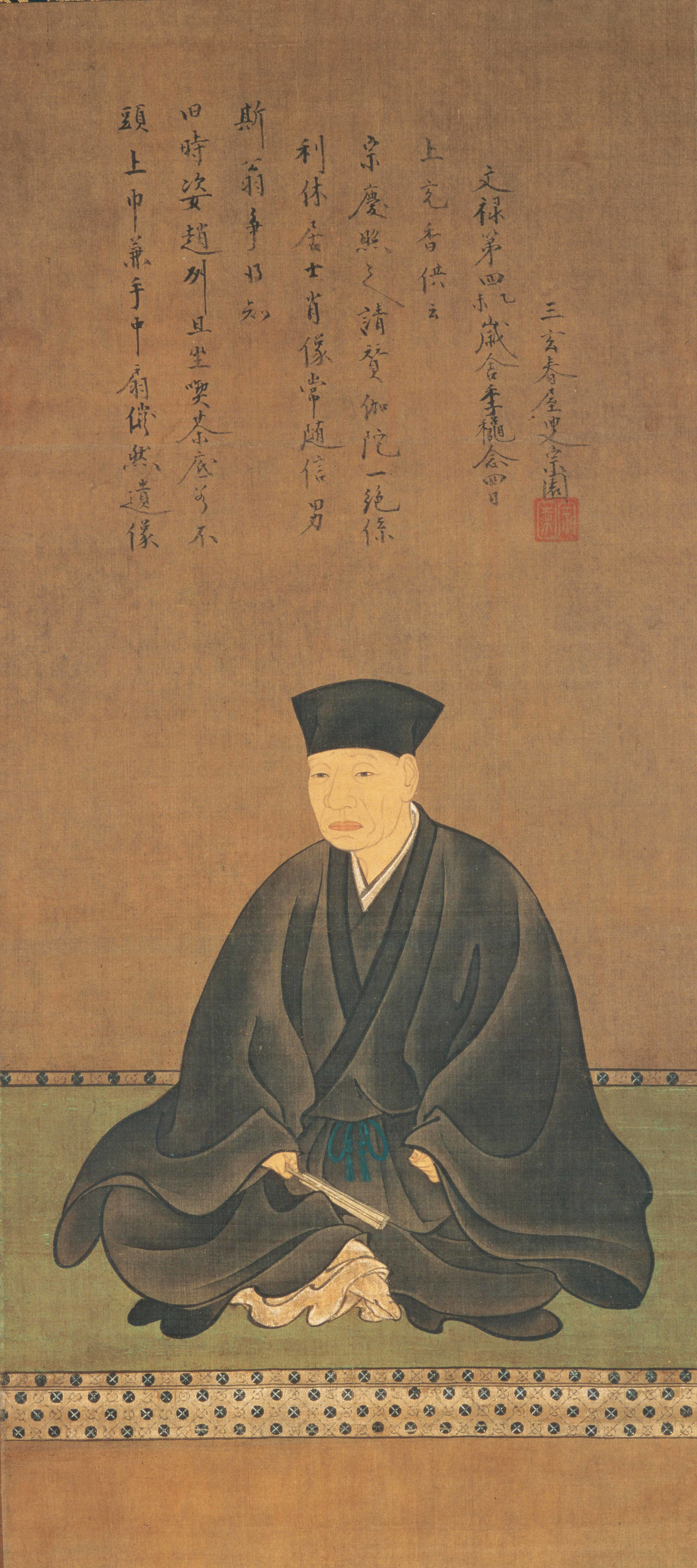
Master Sen no Rikyū, who codified the way of tea (painting by Hasegawa Tōhaku)

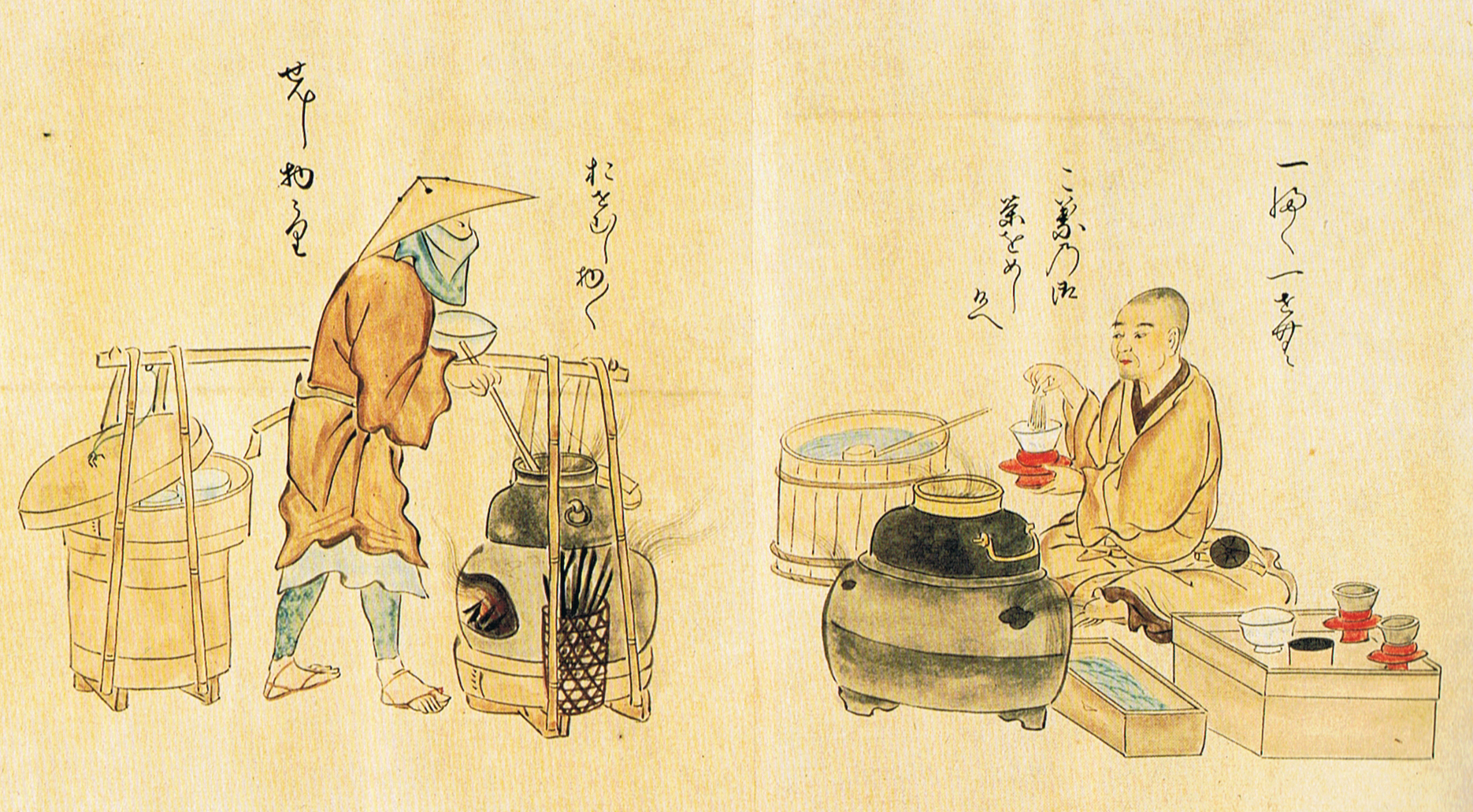
An open tea house serving matcha (ippuku issen (一服一銭), right) and a peddler selling extracts (senjimono-uri (煎じ物売) left), illustration from Shichiju-ichiban shokunin utaawase (七十一番職人歌合), Muromachi period; Ippuku issen's monk clothing depicts the relationship between matcha culture, tea offerings, and Buddhism.

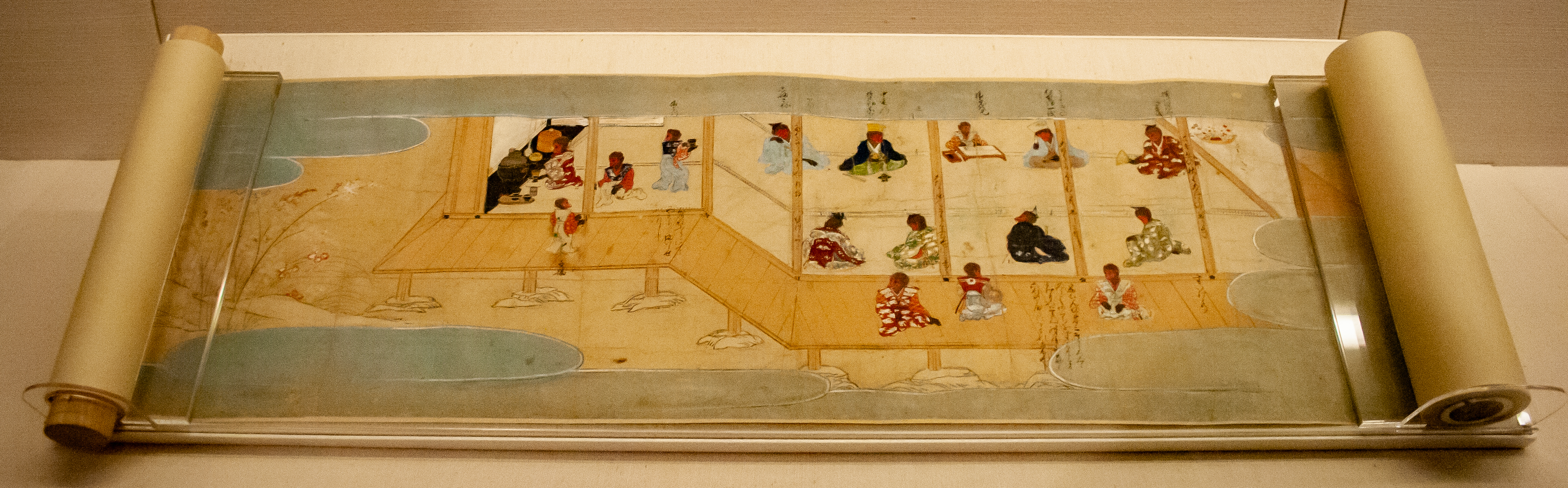
One of the earliest surviving images of the formal serving of tea. Here, monkeys, who were sacred to the shrine, imitate humans in a poetry competition that lasts all night. The monkeys try to stay awake by drinking strong green tea, but some have fallen asleep.

The first documented evidence of tea in Japan dates to the 9th century. An entry in the Nihon Kōki describes Buddhist monk Eichū (永忠) bringing tea back to Japan from Tang China. Eichū personally prepared and served sencha (tea steeped in hot water) to Emperor Saga, who was on an excursion in Karasaki (present Shiga Prefecture) in 815. By imperial order in 816, tea plantations began to be cultivated in the Kinki region of Japan. However, the interest in tea in Japan faded after this.

In China, tea had already been known, according to legend, for more than three thousand years (though the earliest archaeological evidence of tea-drinking dates to the 2nd century BCE). The form of tea popular in China in Eichū's time was dancha (団茶, "cake tea" or "brick tea") – tea compressed into a nugget in the same manner as the pu-er tea is today. This dancha would be ground in a mortar, then mixed with various other herbs and flavourings. The custom of drinking tea, first for medicinal, and then largely for pleasurable reasons, was already widespread throughout China. In the early 9th century, the Chinese author Lu Yu wrote The Classic of Tea, a treatise on tea that focuses on its cultivation and preparation. Lu Yu's, heavily influenced by Buddhism, particularly the Zen–Chán Buddhist school, strongly influenced the development of Japanese tea culture.

Around the end of the 12th century, the style of tea preparation called tencha (点茶), in which powdered matcha was placed into a bowl, hot water added, and the tea and hot water whipped together, was introduced to Japan by Buddhist monk Eisai on his return from China. He also brought tea seeds back with him, which eventually produced tea considered to be the finest in all of Japan. This powdered green tea was first used in religious rituals in Buddhist monasteries. By the 13th century, when the Kamakura shogunate ruled the nation and tea and the luxuries associated with it became a kind of status symbol among the warrior class, there arose tōcha (闘茶, "tea tasting") parties wherein contestants could win prizes for guessing the best quality tea – that was grown in Kyoto, deriving from the seeds that Eisai brought from China.

The next major period in Japanese history was the Muromachi period. This era pointed to the rise of Kitayama Culture (ja:北山文化, Kitayama bunka), centered around the cultural world of Ashikaga Yoshimitsu and his villa in the northern hills of Kyoto (Kinkaku-ji). Later, during this period, the rise of Higashiyama culture, centered around Ashikaga Yoshimasa and his retirement villa in the eastern hills of Kyoto (Ginkaku-ji). This period, approximately 1336 to 1573, saw the budding of what is generally regarded as Japanese traditional culture as it is known today.

The use of Japanese tea developed into a "transformative practice" and began to evolve its own aesthetic, in particular that of wabi-sabi principles. Wabi represents the inner, or spiritual, experiences of human lives. Its original meaning indicated quiet or sober refinement, or subdued taste, characterized by humility, restraint, simplicity, naturalism, profundity, imperfection, and asymmetry, and "emphasizes simple, unadorned objects and architectural space, and celebrates the mellow beauty that time and care impart to materials."

Sabi represents the material side of life. Originally, it meant "worn", "weathered", or "decayed". Particularly among the nobility, understanding emptiness was considered the most effective means to spiritual awakening, while embracing imperfection was honoured as a reminder to cherish one's unpolished and unfinished nature, considered to be the first step to satori, or enlightenment. Central to the concepts of omotenashi, which revolves around hospitality.

Murata Jukō is an early developer of tea as a spiritual practice. He studied Zen under the monk Ikkyū, who revitalized Zen in the 15th century, and this is considered to have influenced his concept of chanoyu. By the 16th century, tea drinking had spread to all levels of society in Japan. Sen no Rikyū and his work Southern Record, perhaps the best-known – and still revered – historical figure in tea, followed his master Takeno Jōō's concept of ichi-go ichi-e, a philosophy that each meeting should be treasured, for it can never be reproduced. His teachings developed many newly forms in architecture and gardens, art, and the formalized of the "way of tea". The principles he set forward – harmony (和, wa), respect (敬, kei), purity (清, sei), and tranquility (寂, jaku) – are still central to tea.

Sen no Rikyū was the leading tea master of Regent Toyotomi Hideyoshi, who supported him in spreading the way of tea, also as a means of solidifying his own political power. Hideyoshi's tastes were influenced by his teamaster, but nevertheless, he also had his own ideas to cement his power, such as constructing the Golden Tea Room and hosting the Grand Kitano Tea Ceremony in 1587. The symbiotic relationship between politics and tea was at its height. However, it was increasingly at odds with the rustic, simple aesthetics continuously advertised by his tea master, which the regent increasingly saw as a threat to cementing his own power and position, and their once close relationship began to suffer.

In 1590, one of the leading disciples of Rikyu, Yamanoue Sōji, was executed on orders of the regent. One year later, the regent ordered his tea master's ritual suicide. The way of tea and politics became closely intertwined during this period. After Rikyū's death, three schools descended from him to continue the tradition, and the practice continued to spread throughout the country and later developed not only among the court and samurai class, but also among the townspeople. Many schools of the Japanese tea ceremony have evolved over the long history of chadō and remain active today.

== Venues ==
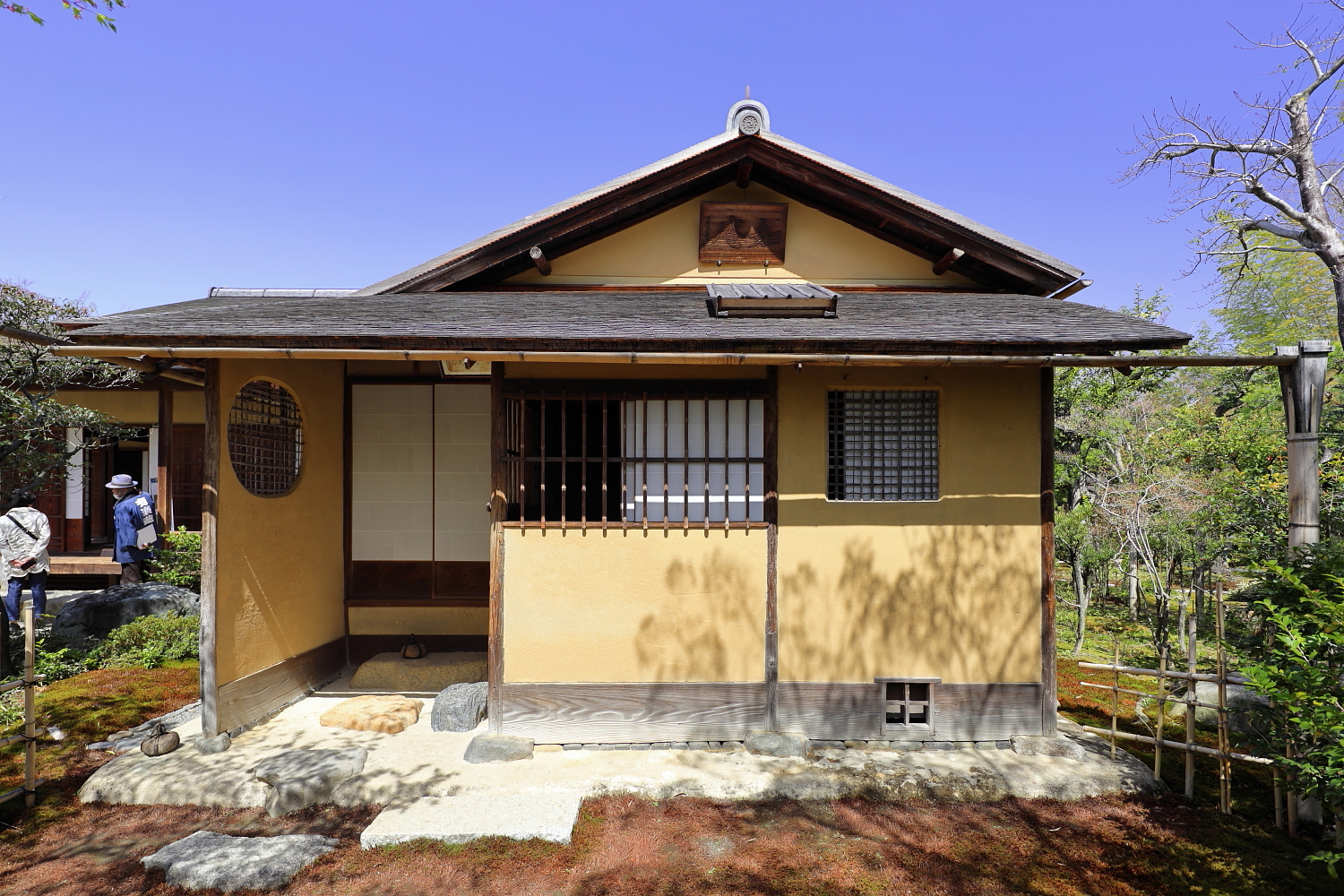
Jo-an chashitsu (National Treasure)

Japanese tea ceremonies are typically conducted in specially constructed spaces or rooms designed for the purpose of the tea ceremony. While a purpose-built tatami-floored room is considered the ideal venue, any place where the necessary implements for the making and serving of the tea can be set out and where the host can make the tea in the presence of the seated guest(s) can be used as a tea venue. For instance, a tea gathering can be held picnic-style in the outdoors, known as nodate (野点). For this occasion, a red parasol called nodatekasa (野点傘) is used. However, when held outdoors, they tend to emphasize the natural surroundings, are more relaxed, are mostly held over the summer or spring, and use more rustic utensils.

A purpose-built room designed for the wabi style of tea is called a chashitsu and is ideally 4.5 tatami in floor area. A purpose-built chashitsu typically has a low ceiling, a hearth built into the floor, an alcove for hanging scrolls and placing other decorative objects, and separate entrances for host and guests. It also has an area known as a mizuya (水屋, "water room"), where the host is able to prepare, clean, and store their equipment before and after the ceremony. This also allows the host to preserve the formality of the ceremony by performing these tasks outside of the guests' view.

A 4.5-mat room is considered standard, but smaller and larger rooms are also used. Building materials and decorations are deliberately simple and rustic in wabi-style tea rooms. Chashitsu can also refer to free-standing buildings for tea. Known in English as tea houses, such structures may contain several tea rooms of different sizes and styles, dressing and waiting rooms, and other amenities, and be surrounded by a tea garden called a roji.

== Seasons ==
Seasonality and the changing of the seasons are considered important for the enjoyment of tea and the tea ceremony. Traditionally, tea practitioners divide the year into two main seasons: the sunken hearth (炉, ro) season, corresponding with the colder months (traditionally November to April), and the brazier (風炉, furo) season, corresponding with the warmer months (traditionally May to October).

The weather determines when to use the sunken hearth or brazier. During the sunken hearth season, the Chajin opens the sunken hearth in the middle of the tea room, where it heats the water and is the only form of heat in the room during the winter. During the brazier season, water is heated in a raised brazier. During the time of year when the brazier does not provide enough heat to the room for the guests to stay warm, but the hearth was too warm, the Chajin could cover the hearth with the lid and put the brazier on top of it.

In addition to the location of the hearth or brazier, smaller aspects also differ. During the winter, a type of incense known as Neriko, a type of incense that is formed into pellets, is used. Jin or Byakudan are used in the summer, and at the end of spring or the beginning of autumn, the Chajin puts out Kokukobei or Umegako. Guests drink tea from a more cylindrical style bowl in the winter to keep in heat, and use a flat bowl in the summer to release heat. Different designs are depicted on the tea bowl based on the season. During the summer, participants wear a kimono made up of one layer to ensure that it is not too hot. However, outside the summer, participants wear a double-layered kimono so they will be warmer. Additionally, the flowers displayed are used to subtly reflect the changing seasons and can help the guests feel nature's rhythm. The configuration of the tatami in a 4.5 mat room often changes with the season as well.

== Thick and thin tea ==
There are two main ways of preparing matcha for tea consumption: thick (濃茶, koicha) and thin (薄茶, usucha), with the best quality tea leaves used in preparing thick tea. Historically, the tea leaves used as packing material for the koicha leaves in the tea urn (茶壺, chatsubo) would be served as thin tea. Japanese historical documents on tea that differentiate between usucha and koicha first appear in the Tenmon era (1532–1555). The earliest documented appearance of the term koicha is in 1575.

As the terms imply, koicha is a thick blend of matcha and hot water that requires about three times as much tea as the equivalent amount of water as usucha; it is kneaded with the whisk to smoothly blend the large amount of powdered tea with the water. Because of this ratio, the mixture creates an almost paste-like texture gives a much stronger flavor. While for usucha, the matcha and hot water are whipped using the tea whisk (茶筅, chasen). This is the more similar to the typical or regularly consumed tea that people tend to think about.

The most important part of a chaji is the preparation and drinking of koicha, which is followed by usucha. The host serves thin tea to each guest in an individual bowl, while one bowl of thick tea is shared among several guests, symbolizing a deep connection among guests. This style of sharing a bowl of koicha first appeared in historical documents in 1586 and is considered to have been invented by Sen no Rikyū. A chakai may involve only the preparation and serving of thin tea (and accompanying confections), representing the more relaxed, finishing portion of a chaji. The serving of koicha is considered more formal as it uses more high quality ingredients and is made when practicing the full-length tea ceremony.

== Equipment ==
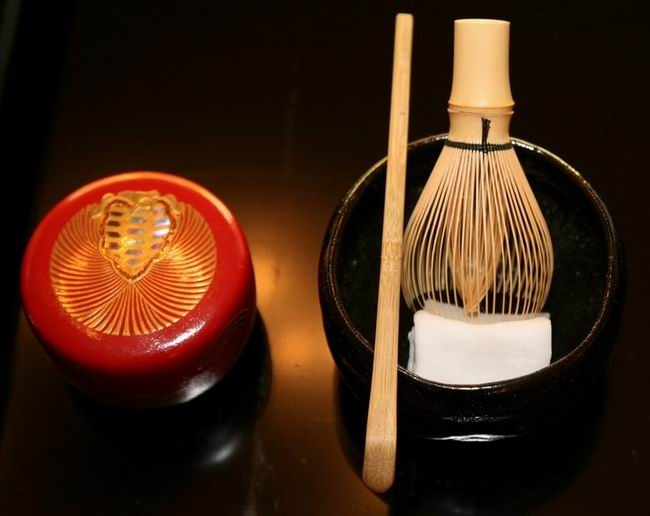
Tea utensils used by Urasenke iemoto Sen Sōshitsu XV

The equipment used in the tea ceremony is referred to as chadōgu (茶道具). There is a wide variety of chadōgu, with particular styles and motifs selected to match various events and seasons. Every piece is given careful attention, with each tool scrupulously cleaned before and after each use and before storing. Some are even handled only while wearing gloves to preserve their condition. Some items, such as the tea storage jar, named Chigusa, are so revered that, historically, they were given proper names like people, and were admired and documented by multiple diarists. The honorary title Senke Jusshoku is given to the ten artisans who provide the utensils for the events held by the three primary iemoto Schools of Japanese tea known as the san-senke.

Some of the more essential components of the tea ceremony are:

Chakin (茶巾)
The chakin is a small rectangular white linen or hemp cloth mainly used to wipe the tea bowl.
Chasen (茶筅, tea whisk)
This is the implement used to mix the powdered tea with the hot water. Tea whisks are carved from a single piece of bamboo. There are various types. Tea whisks quickly become worn and damaged with use, and the host should use a new one when holding a chakai or chaji.
Chashaku (茶杓, tea scoop)
Tea scoops are ladles that are generally are carved from a single piece of bamboo, although they may also be made of ivory or wood. They are used to scoop tea from the tea caddy into the tea bowl. Bamboo tea scoops in the most casual style have a nodule in the approximate center. Larger scoops are used to transfer tea into the tea caddy in the mizuya (preparation area), but these are not seen by guests. Different styles and colours are used in various tea traditions.
Chawan (茶碗, tea bowl)
Tea bowls are available in a wide range of sizes and styles, and different styles are used for thick and thin tea. In the Japanese tea ceremony chanoyu, tea bowls are made both to prepare and drink the matcha served. Shallow bowls, which allow the tea to cool rapidly, are used in summer; deep bowls are used in winter. Bowls are frequently named by their creators or owners, or by a tea master. Bowls over four hundred years old are in use today, but only on unusually special occasions. The best bowls are thrown by hand, and some bowls are extremely valuable. Irregularities and imperfections are prized: they are often featured prominently as the "front" of the bowl.
Natsume/Chaire (棗・茶入, tea caddy)
The small lidded container in which the powdered tea is placed for use in the tea-making procedure ([お]手前; [お]点前; [御]手前, [o]temae). The natsume is usually employed for usucha and the chaire for koicha.

== Procedures ==
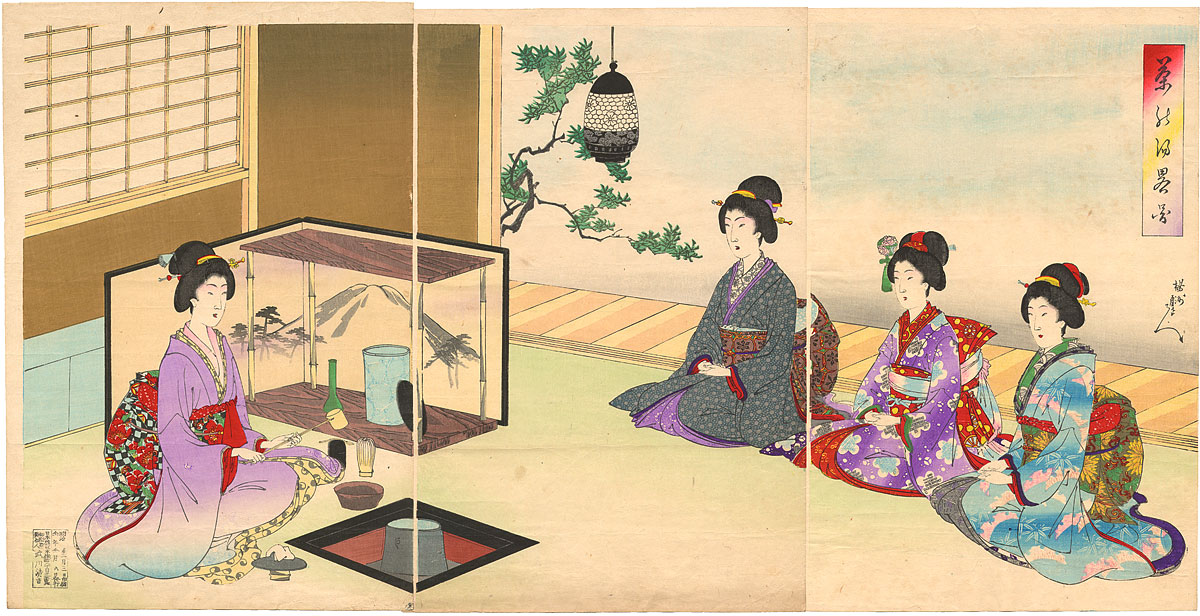
Guests seated to receive tea (print by Yōshū Chikanobu)

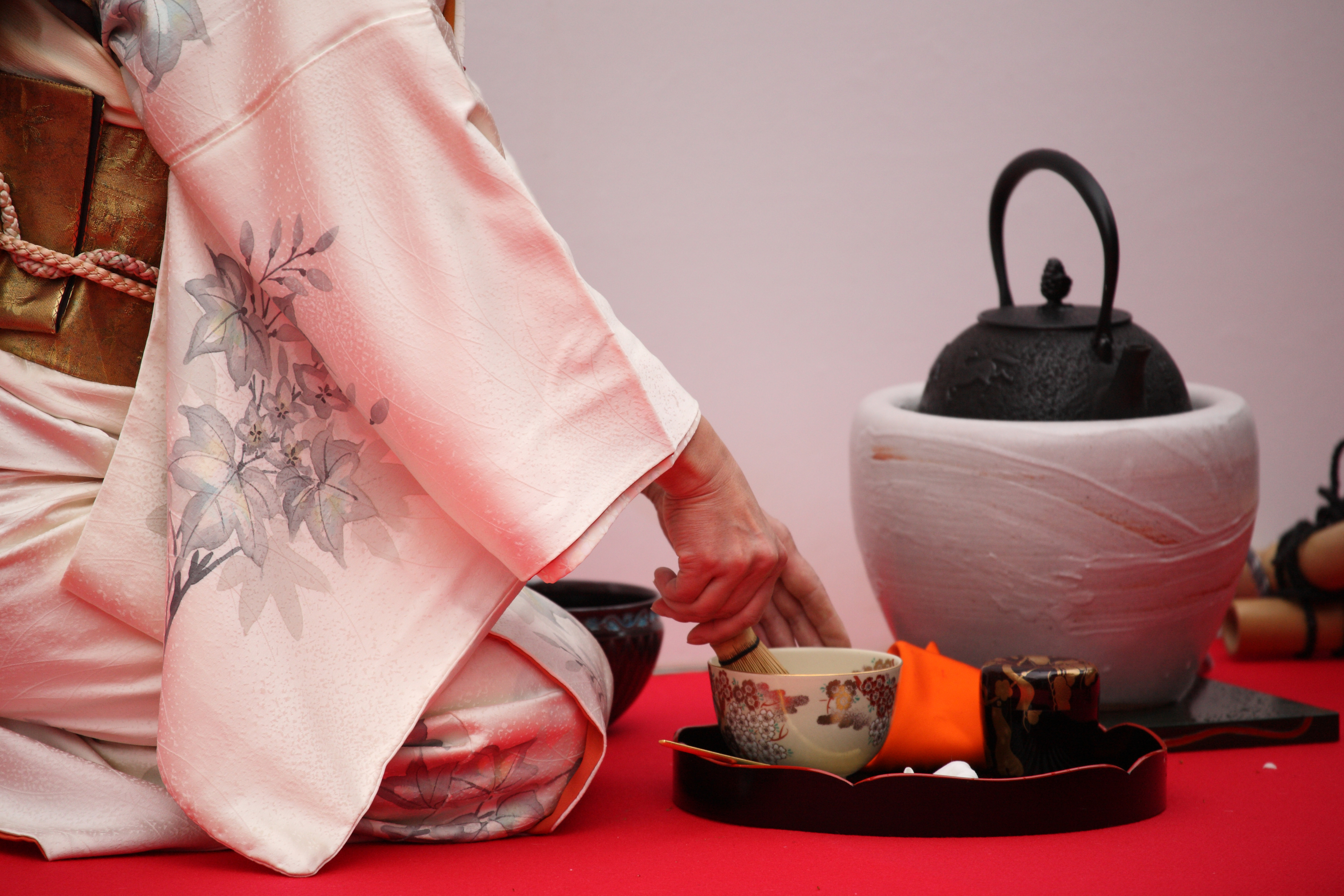
The hostess fills the bowl with green tea powder and then pours hot water into it and stirs with a bamboo whisk.

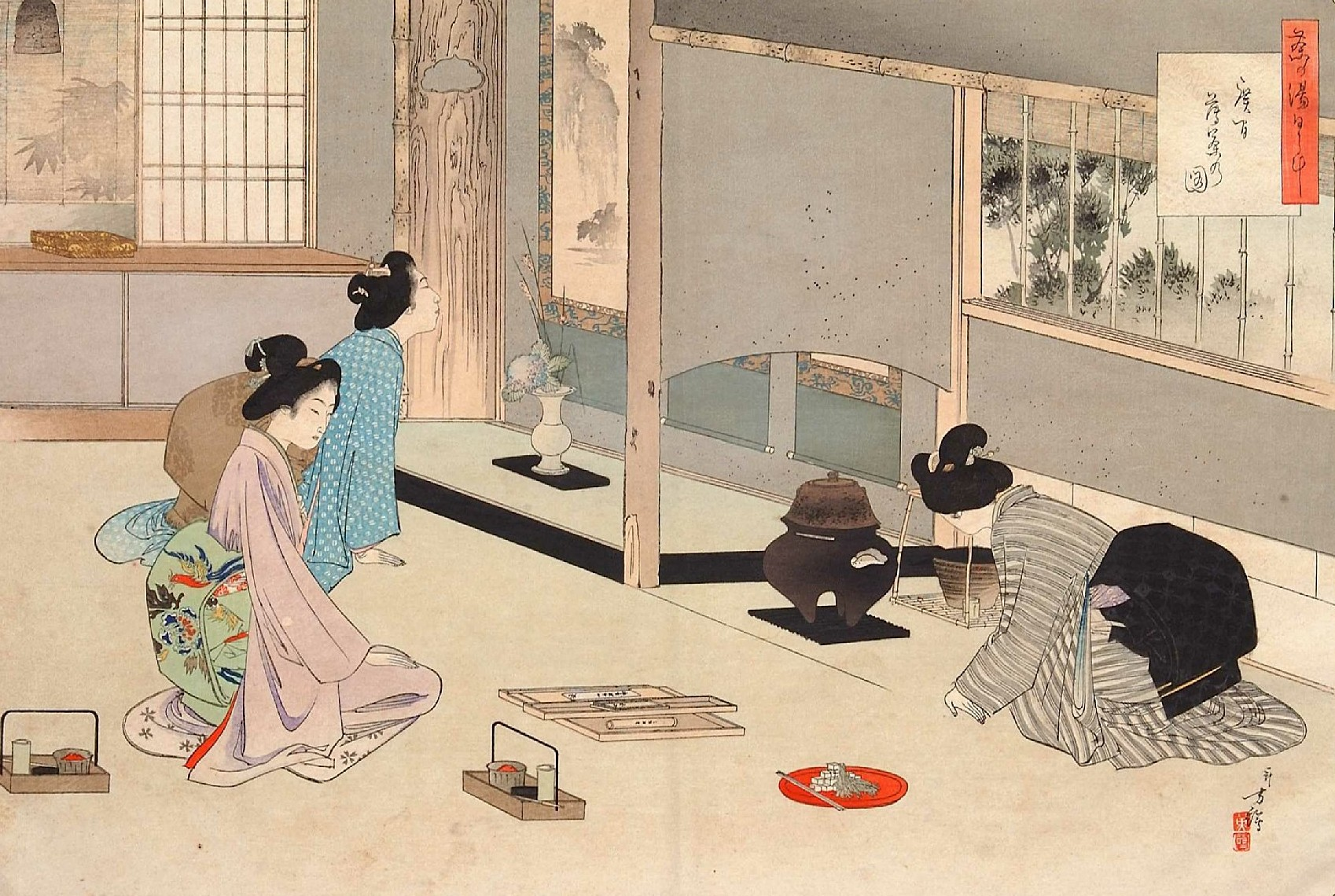
Guests may be allowed after the serving of the tea (otemae) to take a closer look at the objects in the room (Nishiki-e by Mizuno Toshikata).

Procedures vary from school to school and depend on the time of year, time of day, venue, and other considerations. The noon tea gathering of one host and a maximum of five guests is considered the most formal chaji. The following describes the general procedure of a formal, idealized noon chaji held in the cool weather season at a purpose-built tea house, which represents one of the more traditional and elaborate forms of the Japanese tea ceremony.

The guests arrive a little before the appointed time and enter an interior waiting room, where they store unneeded items such as coats and put on fresh tabi socks. Ideally, the waiting room has a tatami floor and an alcove (tokonoma), in which is displayed a hanging scroll which may allude to the season, the theme of the chaji, or some other appropriate theme.

The guests are served a cup of hot water, kombu tea, roasted barley tea, or sakurayu. When all the guests have arrived and finished their preparations, they proceed to the outdoor waiting bench in the roji, where they remain until summoned by the host.

Following a silent bow between host and guests, the guests proceed to a tsukubai (stone basin) where they ritually purify themselves by washing their hands and rinsing their mouths with water, and then continue along the roji to the tea house. They remove their footwear and enter the tea room through a small "crawling-in" door (nijiri-guchi), and proceed to view the items placed in the tokonoma and any tea equipment placed ready in the room, and are then seated seiza-style on the tatami in order of prestige.

When the last guest has taken their place, they close the door with an audible sound to alert the host, who enters the tea room and welcomes each guest, and then answers questions posed by the first guest about the scroll and other items.

The chaji begins in the cool months with the laying of the charcoal fire, which is used to heat the water. Following this, guests are served a meal in several courses accompanied by sake and followed by a small sweet (wagashi) eaten from special paper called kaishi (懐紙), which each guest carries, often in a decorative wallet or tucked into the front of the kimono. The kaishi can also be used to wipe down equipment or clean hands, much like the use of a napkin. After the meal, there is a break called a nakadachi (中立ち) during which the guests return to the waiting shelter until summoned again by the host, who uses the break to sweep the tea room, take down the scroll, and replace it with a flower arrangement, open the tea room's shutters, and make preparations for serving the tea.

Having been summoned back to the tea room by the sound of a bell or gong rung in prescribed ways, the guests again purify themselves and examine the items placed in the tea room. The host then enters, ritually cleanses each utensil – including the tea bowl, whisk, and tea scoop – in the presence of the guests in a precise order and using prescribed motions, and places them in an exact arrangement according to the particular temae procedure being performed. When the preparation of the utensils is complete, the host prepares thick tea.

Bows are exchanged between the host and the guest receiving the tea. The guest then bows to the second guest and raises the bowl in a gesture of respect to the host. The guest turns the bowl slightly as to not drink from the side facing the host, takes a sip, and compliments the host on the tea. After taking a few sips, the guest wipes clean the rim of the bowl and passes it to the second guest. The procedure is repeated until all guests have taken tea from the same bowl; each guest then has an opportunity to admire the bowl before it is returned to the host, who then cleanses the equipment and leaves the tea room.

The host then rekindles the fire and adds more charcoal. This signifies a change from the more formal portion of the gathering to the more casual portion, and the host will return to the tea room to bring in a smoking set (タバコ盆, tabako-bon) and more confections, usually higashi, to accompany the thin tea, and possibly cushions for the guests' comfort.

The host will then proceed with the preparation of an individual bowl of thin tea to be served to each guest. In more formal ceremonies, conversation is limited to a few formal exchanges between the first guest and the host during the earlier portions of the gathering, while in the usucha portion, after a similar ritual exchange, the guests may engage in more casual conversation.

After all the guests have taken tea, the host cleans the utensils in preparation for putting them away. The guest of honour will request that the host allow the guests to examine some of the utensils, and each guest in turn examines each item, including the tea caddy and the tea scoop. (This examination is done to show respect and admiration for the host.) The items are treated with extreme care and reverence as they may be priceless, irreplaceable, handmade antiques, and guests often use a special brocaded cloth to handle them.

The host then collects the utensils, and the guests leave the tea house. The host bows from the door, and the gathering is over. A tea gathering can last up to four hours, depending on the type of occasion, the number of guests, and the types of meal and tea served.

== Types ==
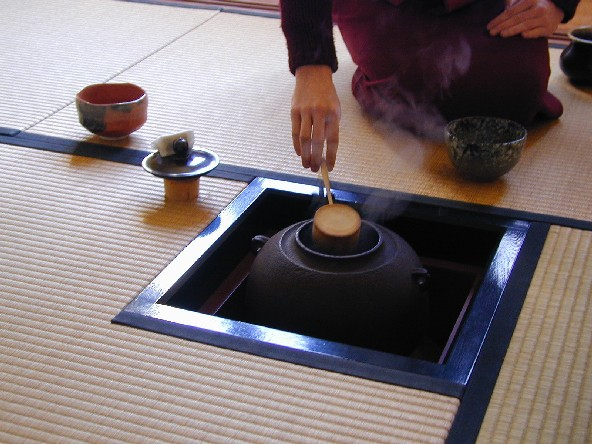
A host rests a bamboo ladle on an iron pot that rests inside the sunken ro hearth.

Every action in chadō – how a kettle is used, how a teacup is examined, how tea is scooped into a cup – is performed in a very specific way, and may be thought of as a procedure or technique. The procedures performed in chadō are known collectively as temae. The act of performing these procedures during a chaji is called "doing temae".

There are many styles of temae, depending upon the school, occasion, season, setting, equipment, and countless other possible factors. The following is a short, general list of common types of temae.

=== Chabako temae ===
Chabako temae (茶箱手前) is so called because the equipment is removed from and then replaced into a special box known as a chabako (茶箱, lit. 'tea box'). Chabako developed as a convenient way to prepare the necessary equipment for making tea outdoors. The basic equipment contained in the chabako are the tea bowl, tea whisk (kept in a special container), tea scoop and tea caddy, and linen wiping cloth in a special container, as well as a container for little candy-like sweets. Many of the items are smaller than usual, to fit in the box. This gathering takes approximately 35–40 minutes.

=== Hakobi temae ===
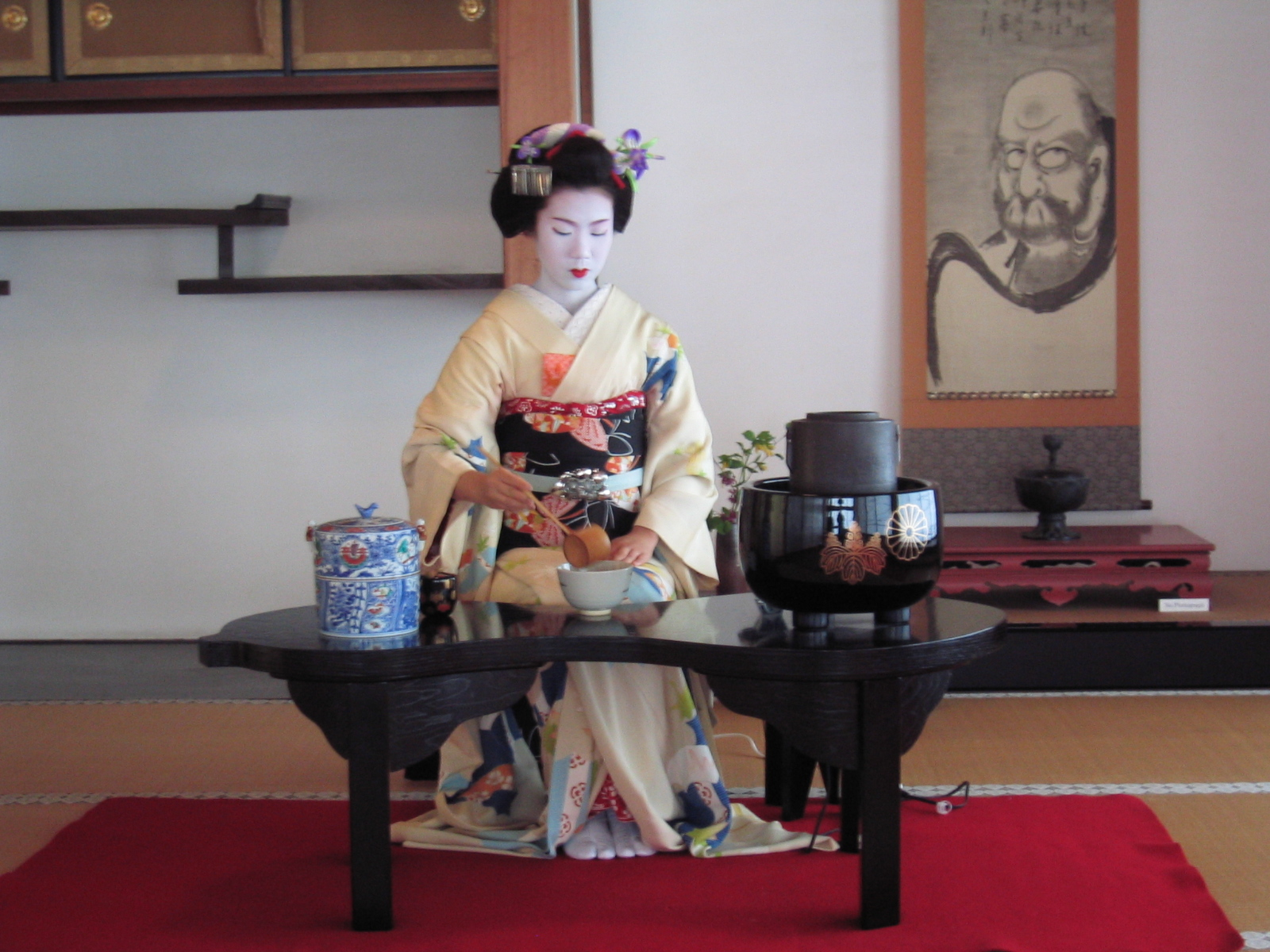
A maiko does a ryūrei style tea where a table and chair are used; visible from left to right are the fresh water container, caddy, bowl, and iron pot.

Hakobi temae (運び手前) is so called because, except for the hot water kettle (and brazier if a sunken hearth is not being used), the essential items for the tea-making, including even the fresh water container, are carried into the tea room by the host as a part of the temae. In other temae, the water jar and perhaps other items, depending upon the style of temae, are placed in the tea room before the guests enter.

=== Obon temae ===
Obon temae (お盆手前), bon temae (盆手前), or bonryaku temae (盆略手前) is a simple procedure for making usucha (thin tea). The tea bowl, tea whisk, tea scoop, chakin and tea caddy are placed on a tray, and the hot water is prepared in a kettle called a tetsubin, which is heated on a brazier. This is usually the first temae learned, and is the easiest to perform, requiring neither much specialized equipment nor a lot of time to complete. It may easily be done sitting at a table, or outdoors, using a thermos pot in place of the tetsubin and portable hearth.

=== Ryūrei ===
In the ryūrei (立礼) style, the tea is prepared with the host seated on a chair at a special table, and the guests also seated on chairs at tables. It is possible, therefore, for ryūrei-style temae to be conducted nearly anywhere, even outdoors. The name refers to the host's practice of performing the first and last bows while standing. In ryūrei there is usually an assistant who sits near the host and moves the host's seat out of the way as needed for standing or sitting. The assistant also serves the tea and sweets to the guests. This procedure originated in the Urasenke school, initially for serving non-Japanese guests who, it was thought, would be more comfortable sitting on chairs.

== Essential elements ==
=== Tea room ===
A typical winter tea room layout in a 4.5 mat tea room, showing position of tatami, tokonoma, mizuya dōkō, hearth, guests and host

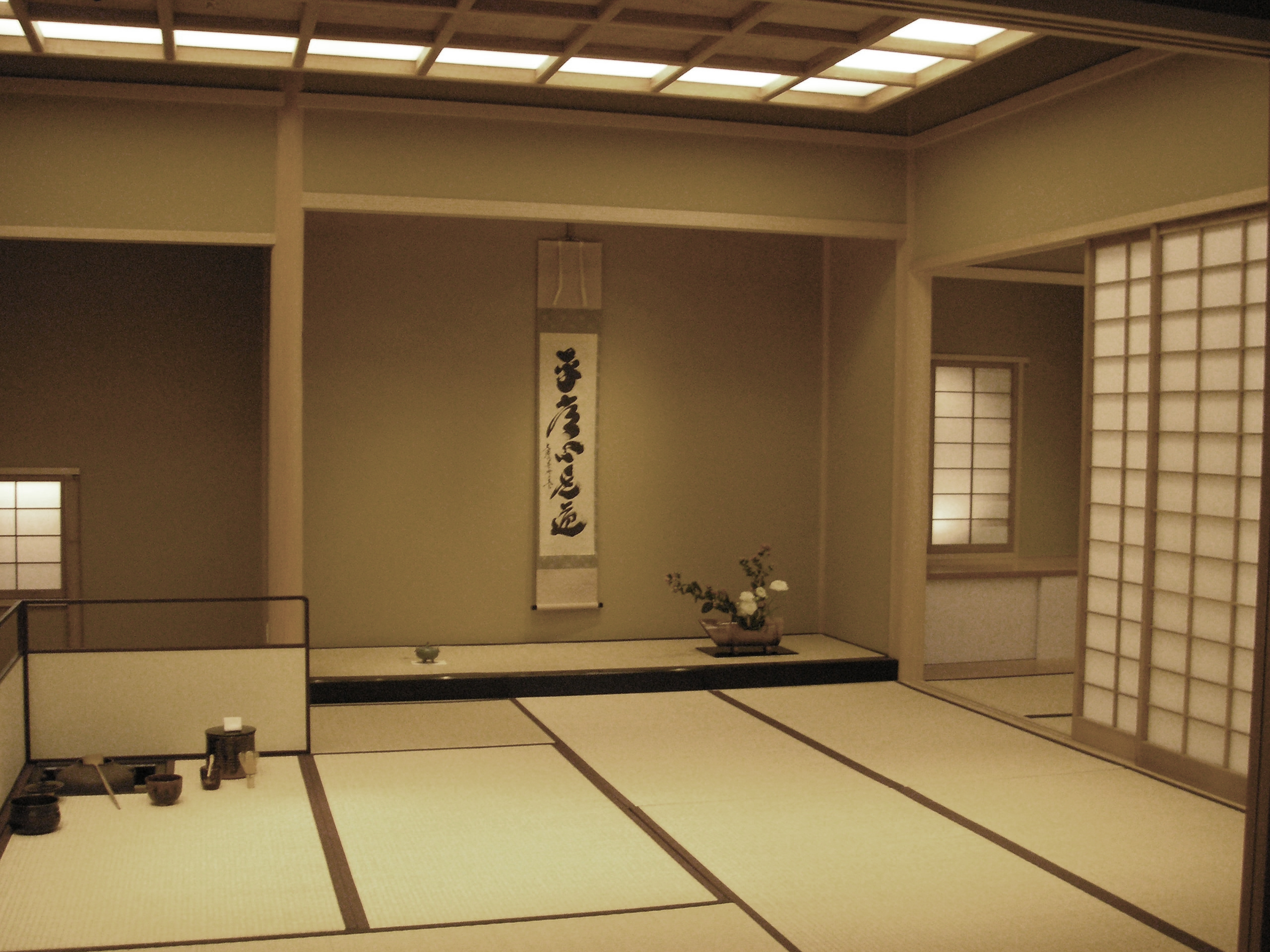
An interior view of a large tea room with tatami and tokonoma. In the tokonoma is a hanging scroll, flower arrangement (not chabana style), and incense burner.

The Japanese traditional floor mats, tatami, are used in various ways in tea offerings. Their placement, determines how a person walks through the tea room chashitsu, and different seating positions.

The use of tatami flooring has influenced the development of tea. For instance, when walking on tatami it is customary to shuffle in order to avoid causing disturbance. Shuffling forces one to slow down, to maintain erect posture, walk quietly, and helps one to maintain balance as the combination of tabi and tatami makes for a slippery surface. This is due to the Kimono's restricted movement. Additionally, one must avoid walking on the joins between mats. The reason being that it would damage the tatami. Therefore, tea students are taught to step over such joins when walking in the tea room.

The placement of tatami in tea rooms differs slightly from the normal placement in regular Japanese-style rooms, and may also vary by season (where it is possible to rearrange the mats). In a 4.5 mat room, the mats are placed in a circular pattern around a centre mat. Purpose-built tea rooms have a sunken hearth in the floor which is used in winter. A special tatami is used which has a cut-out section providing access to the hearth. In summer, the hearth is covered either with a small square of extra tatami, or, more commonly, the hearth tatami is replaced with a full mat, totally hiding the hearth.

It is customary to avoid stepping on this centre mat whenever possible, as well as to avoid placing the hands palm-down on it, as it functions as a kind of table: tea utensils are placed on it for viewing, and prepared bowls of tea are placed on it for serving to the guests. To avoid stepping on it people may walk around it on the other mats, or shuffle on the hands and knees.

Except when walking, when moving about on the tatami one places one's closed fists on the mats and uses them to pull oneself forward or push backwards while maintaining a seiza position.

There are dozens of real and imaginary lines that crisscross any tearoom. These lines used to determine the exact placement of utensils and myriad other details; when performed by skilled practitioners, the placement of utensils will vary minutely from gathering to gathering. The lines in tatami mats (畳目, tatami-me) are used as one guide for placement, and the joins serve as a demarcation indicating where people should sit.

Tatami provide a more comfortable surface for sitting seiza-style. At certain times of year (primarily during the Japanese New Year) the portions of the tatami where guests sit may be covered with a red felt cloth.

=== Hanging scroll ===
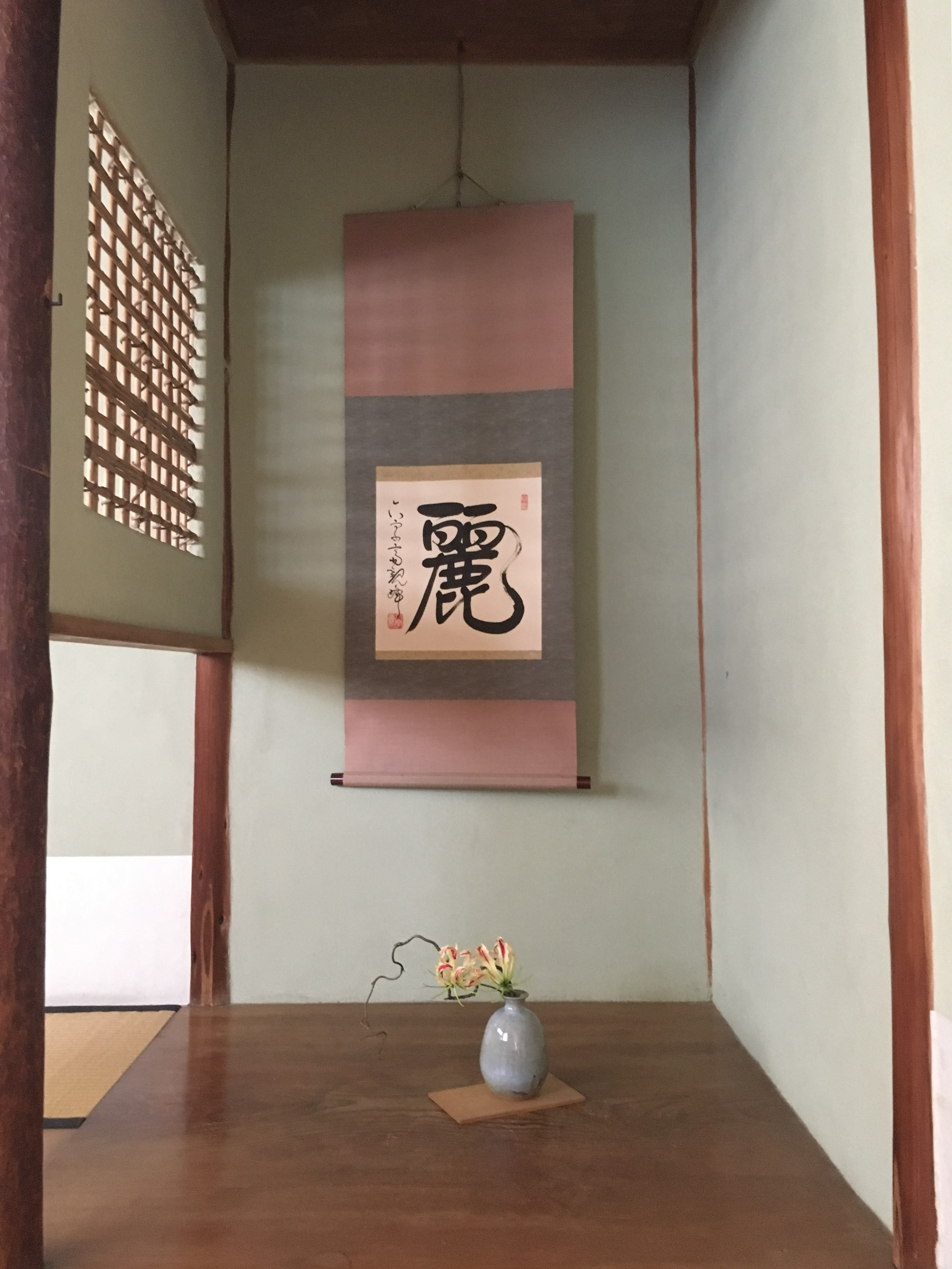
A tokonoma alcove with a kakemono hanging scroll, in front of it a small chabana flower arrangement

Calligraphy, mainly in the form of hanging scrolls, plays a central role in tea. Scrolls, often written by famous calligraphers or Buddhist monks, are hung in the tokonoma (scroll alcove) of the tea room. They are selected based on the theme of the occasion and season. Calligraphic scrolls may feature Buddhism, poems, descriptions of famous places, or words or phrases associated with tea.

Historian and author Haga Kōshirō points out that it is clear from the teachings of Sen no Rikyū recorded in the Nanpō roku that the suitability of any particular scroll for a tea gathering depends not only on the subject of the writing itself but also on the virtue of the writer. Haga points out that Rikyū preferred to hang bokuseki ("ink traces"), the calligraphy of Zen Buddhist priests, in the tea room. A typical example of a hanging scroll in a tea room might have the kanji wa-kei-sei-jaku (和敬清寂, "harmony", "respect", "purity" and "tranquility"), expressing the four key principles of the Way of Tea. Some contain only a single character. For example, in summer, kaze (風, "wind") would be appropriate. Hanging scrolls that feature a painting instead of calligraphy, or a combination of both, are also used. Scrolls are sometimes placed in the waiting room as well.

=== Flower arrangement ===
Chabana (literally "tea flower") is the simple style of flower arrangement used in tea rooms. Chabana has its roots in ikebana, an older style of Japanese flower arranging, which itself has roots in Shinto and Buddhism.

It evolved from the "free-form" style of ikebana called nageirebana (投げ入れ, "throw-in flowers"), which was used by early tea masters. Chabana was developed by Sen no Rikyū. He is said to have taught that chabana should give the viewer the same impression that those flowers naturally would give if they were still growing outdoors, in nature.

Unnatural or out-of-season materials are never used, as well as props and other devices. The containers in which chabana are arranged are referred to generically as hanaire (花入れ). Chabana arrangements typically comprise few items, and little or no filler material. In the summer, when many flowering grasses are in season in Japan, however, it is seasonally appropriate to arrange a number of such flowering grasses in an airy basket-type container. Unlike ikebana (which often uses shallow, wide dishes), tall, narrow hanaire are frequently used in chabana. The containers for the flowers used in tea rooms are typically made from natural materials such as bamboo, as well as metal or ceramic, but rarely glass as ikebana (another flower arrangement) uses short, glass vases.

Chabana arrangements are so simple that frequently no more than a single blossom is used; this blossom will invariably lean towards or face the guests.

=== Meal ===
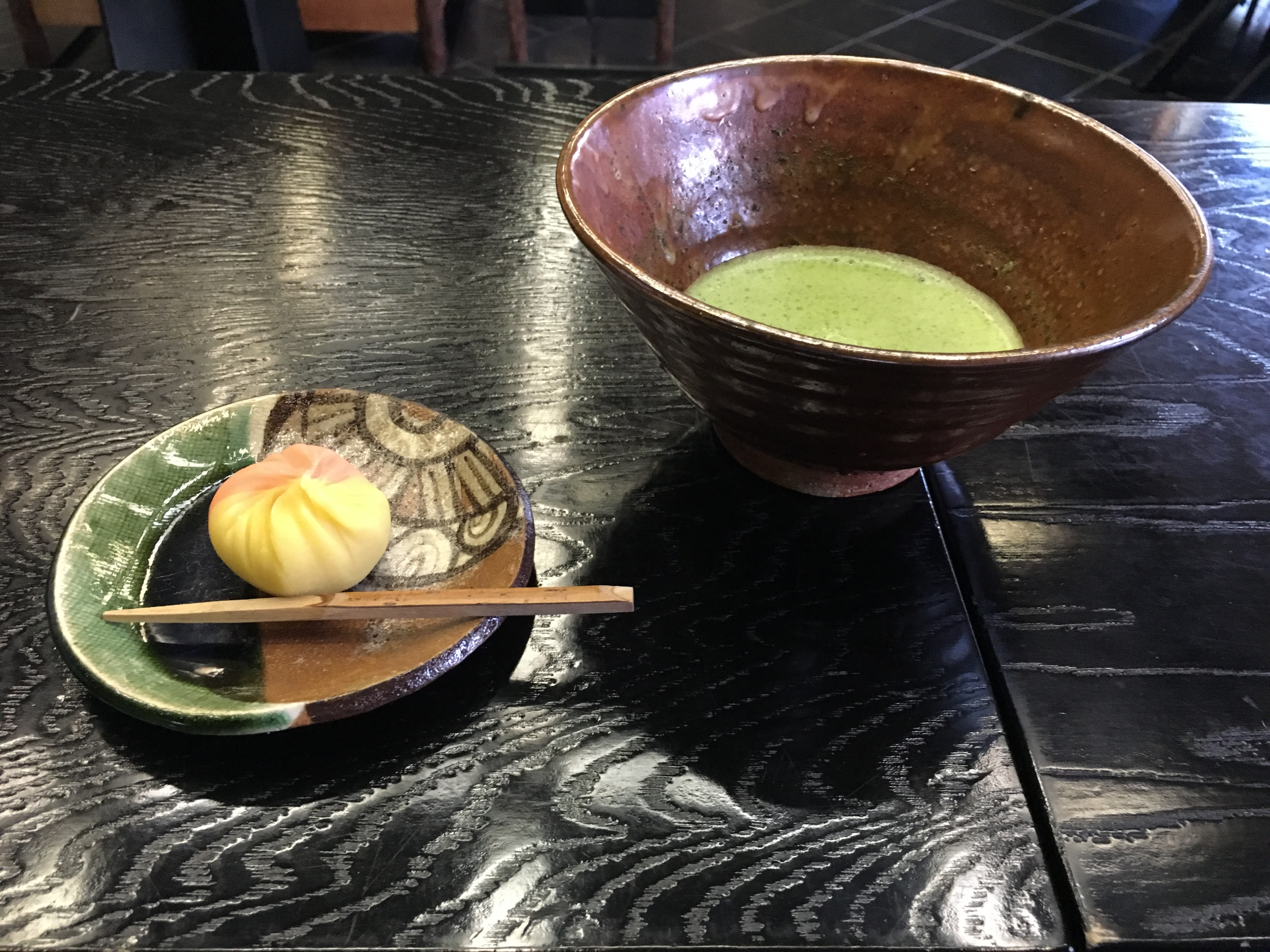
A small wagashi sweet served on an Oribe ware plate, next to an Ido ware chawan filled with green matcha

Kaiseki (懐石) or cha-kaiseki (茶懐石) is a meal served in the context of a formal tea function. In cha-kaiseki, only fresh seasonal ingredients are used, prepared in ways that aim to enhance their flavour. Great care is taken in selecting ingredients and types of food, and the finished dishes are carefully presented on serving ware that is chosen to enhance the appearance and seasonal theme of the meal. Dishes are intricately arranged and garnished, often with real edible leaves and flowers that are to help enhance the flavour of the food. Serving ware and garnishes are as much a part of the kaiseki experience as the food; some might argue that the aesthetic experience of seeing the food is even more important than the physical experience of eating it.

Courses are served in small servings in individual dishes. Each diner has a small lacquered tray to themselves; very important people may be provided their own low, lacquered table or several small tables.

Because cha-kaiseki generally follows traditional eating habits in Japan, meat dishes are rare.

=== Clothing ===
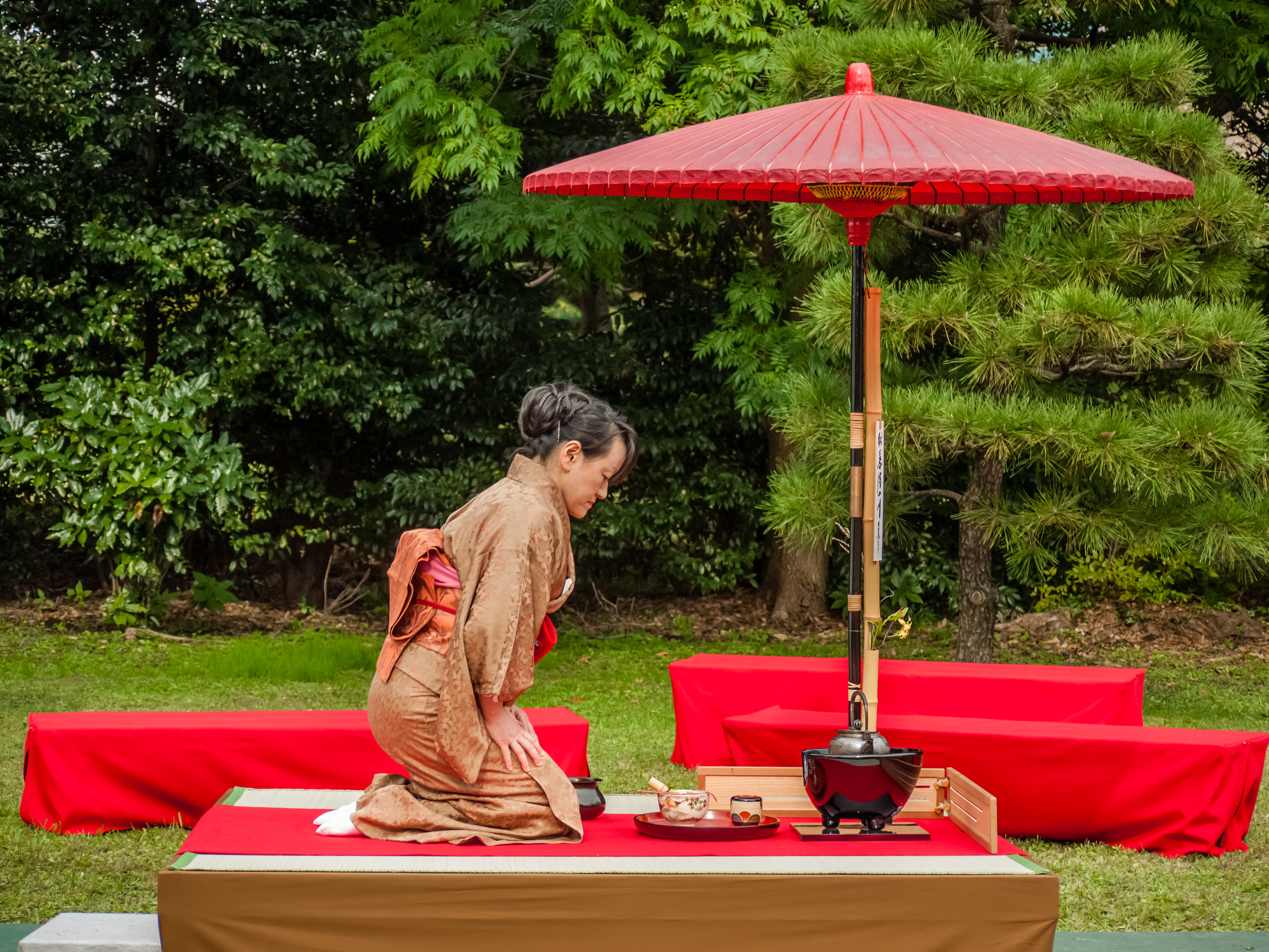
Tea being prepared outdoors called nodate, underneath a red parasol called nodatekasa. The hostess wears a brown kimono.

Many of the movements and components of tea ceremonies evolved from the wearing of kimono. For example, certain movements are designed to keep dangling sleeves out of the way or prevent them from becoming dirty. Other motions allow for the straightening of the kimono and the hakama.

Some aspects of tea ceremony – such as the use of silk fukusa cloths – cannot be performed without wearing a kimono and obi, or a belt substitute, as the cloth is folded and tucked into the obi within the ceremony. Other items, such as kaishi, smaller cloths known as kobukusa (小袱紗), and fans, require kimono collars, sleeves and the obi worn with them in order to be used throughout the ceremony; otherwise, a substitute for storing these items on the person must be found.

For this reason, most tea ceremonies are conducted in kimono, and though students may practice wearing Western clothes, students of tea ceremony will need to wear kimono at some point. On formal occasions, the host of the tea ceremony will always wear kimono, and for guests, formal kimono or Western formal wear must be worn. No matter the style of clothing, the attire worn at a tea gathering is usually subdued and conservative, so as not to be distracting.

For women, the type of kimono worn is usually an iromuji – a solid-colour, unpatterned kimono, worn with a nagoya obi in an appropriate tanmono fabric; slub-weave silks, shibori patterns and generally bright-coloured obi are not worn. Edo komon kimono may also be worn, as their patterns are small enough as to be unobtrusive.

Men may wear kimono only, or (for more formal occasions) a combination of kimono and hakama (a long, divided or undivided skirt worn over the kimono). Those who have earned the right may wear a kimono with a jittoku (十徳) or juttoku jacket instead of hakama.

Women wear various styles of kimono depending on the season and the event; women generally do not wear hakama for tea occasions or jittoku.

Lined kimono are worn by both men and women in the winter months, and unlined kimono are worn in the summer. For formal occasions, montsuki kimono (紋付着物) (kimono with three to five family crests on the sleeves and back) are worn. Both men and women wear white tabi (divided-toe socks).

== Schools ==
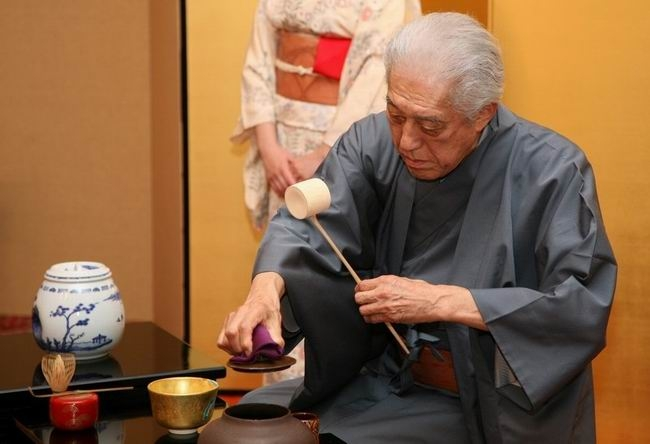
Tea ceremony performed by Sen Genshitsu, 15th Grand Master of the Urasenke school

In Japan, people who wish to study tea ceremony typically join a "circle", (a group that meets regularly to participate in a given activity.) People who wish to study the different tea ceremonies can do so at junior and high schools, colleges and universities.

These classes may be held at community centres, dedicated tea schools, or private homes. Tea schools often teach a wide variety of pupils who may study at different times. For example, the school may have a group for women, a group for older students, and a group for younger students. Students normally pay a monthly fee which covers tuition and the use of the school's (or teacher's) bowls and other equipment, the tea itself, and the sweets that students serve and eat at every class. Students must be equipped with their own fukusa, fan, kaishi paper, and kobukusa, as well as their own wallet in which to place these items.

Though some groups and practitioners of tea ceremony may wear Western clothing, for most occasions of tea ceremony – particularly if the teacher is highly ranked within the tradition – wearing kimono is mostly considered essential for women. In some cases, advanced students may be given permission to wear the school's mark in place of the usual family crests on formal kimono. This permission usually accompanies the granting of a chamei, or "tea name", to the student.

New students typically begin by observing more advanced students as they practice. New students are taught mostly by more advanced students; the most advanced students are taught exclusively by the teacher. The first things new students learn are how to correctly open and close sliding doors, how to walk on tatami, how to enter and exit the tea room, how to bow and to whom and when to do so, how to wash, store and care for the various equipment, how to fold the fukusa, how to ritually clean tea equipment, and how to wash and fold chakin. As they master these essential steps, students are also taught how to behave as a guest at tea ceremonies: the correct words to say, how to handle bowls, how to drink tea and eat sweets, how to use paper and sweet-picks, and myriad other details.

As they master the basics, students will be instructed on how to prepare the powdered tea for use, how to fill the tea caddy, and finally, how to measure the tea and water and whisk it to the proper consistency. Once these basic steps have been mastered, students begin to practice the simplest temae, O-bon temae. Only when the first offering has been mastered will students move on. Study is through observation and hands on practice; students do not often take notes, and many teachers discourage the practice of note-taking.

Typically, each class ends with the whole group being given brief instruction by the main teacher, usually concerning the contents of the tokonoma (the scroll alcove, which typically features a hanging scroll (usually with calligraphy), a flower arrangement, and occasionally other objects as well) and the sweets that have been served that day. Related topics include incense and kimono, or comments on seasonal variations in equipment or offerings.

As they master each offering, some schools and teachers present students with certificates at a formal ceremony. Depending on the school, this certificate may warrant that the student has mastered a given temae, or may give the student permission to begin studying a given temae. Acquiring such certificates is often expensive, the students must not only pay for the preparation of the certificate itself and for participating in the gathering during which it is bestowed, but they also expected to thank the teacher by presenting them with monetary gifts. The cost of acquiring certificates increases as the student's level increases.

== Senchadō ==
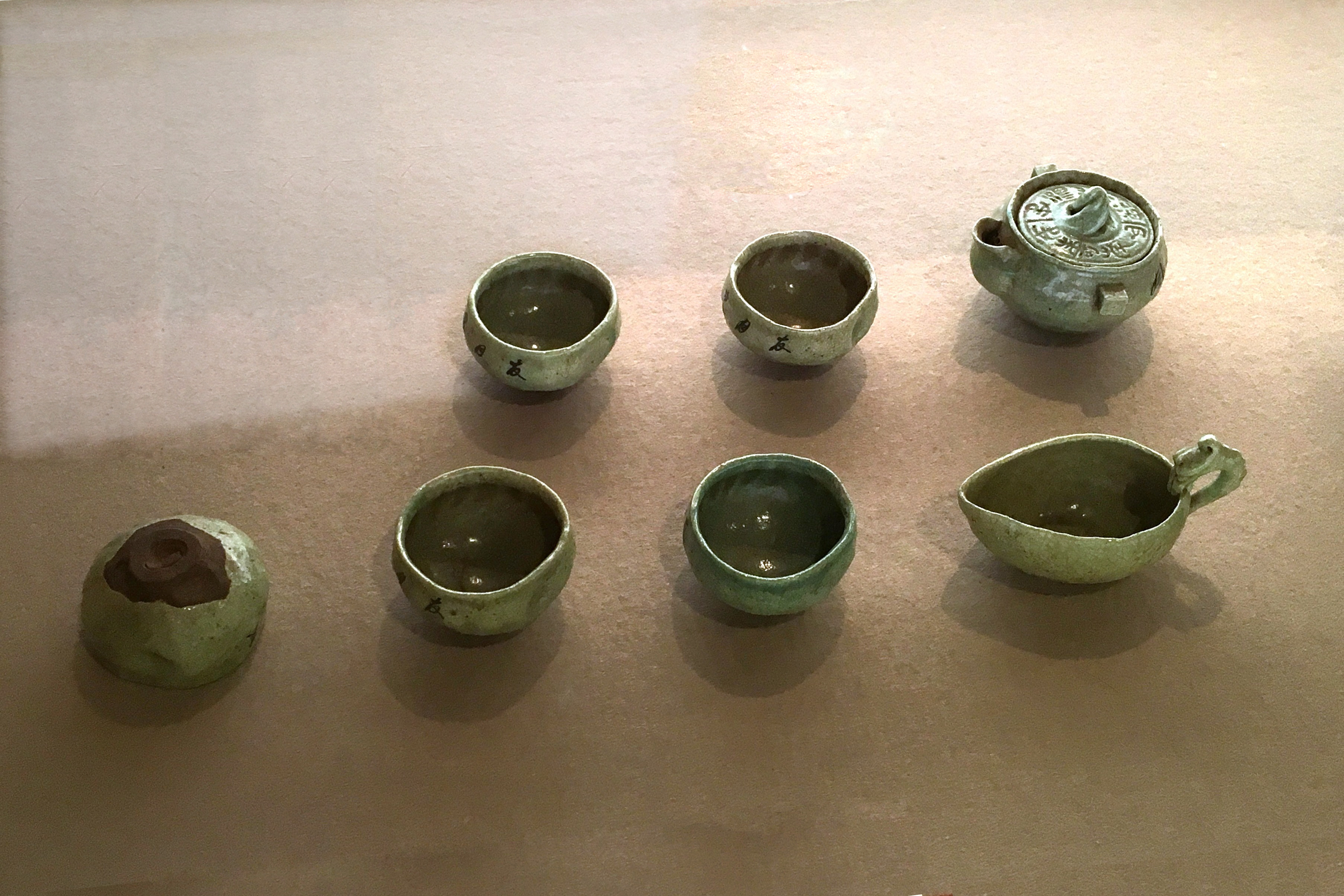
A set of sencha utensils, Sasashima ware, Maki Bokusai, Edo period, 18th–19th century

Like the formal traditions of matcha, there are formal traditions of sencha, distinguished as senchadō, typically involving the high-grade gyokuro class of sencha. This Chinese style offering was introduced to Japan in the 17th century by Ingen, the founder of the Ōbaku school of Zen Buddhism, also more Chinese in style than earlier schools. In the 18th century, it was popularized by the Ōbaku monk Baisao, who sold tea in Kyoto, and later came to be regarded as the first sencha master. It remains associated with the Ōbaku school, and the head temple of Manpuku-ji hosts regular sencha tea conventions.

== See also ==
- Higashiyama culture in Muromachi period
- Japanese tea classics
- Japanese tea utensils, for a full list of utensils used in Japanese tea
- Matcha, for information about the tea itself
- Wabi-sabi
- East Asian tea ceremony, for tea ceremony in East Asian cultures as a whole
- Teaware, or Tea ware
- Tea culture in Japan
