= Sen Sōshitsu =

Japanese tea ceremony family name

Sen Sōshitsu (千宗室) is the traditional name carried by the head of the Urasenke family in Japan. Sen is the family name and Sōshitsu is the hereditary name assumed by the successor upon becoming iemoto of Urasenke. The first person in this line of the Sen family to use the name Sōshitsu was the youngest son of Sen no Sōtan; in other words, a great-grandson of Sen no Rikyū. He is generally known as Sensō Sōshitsu (仙叟宗室), without mention of the family name, and is counted as the fourth generation in the Urasenke family line. The current head of Urasenke is the sixteenth generation, Sen Sōshitsu XVI, who is distinguished by his cognomen, Zabōsai (1982-Present).

The kanji character for sō, 宗, in the hereditary name may be interpreted to mean "family core". Like the head of Urasenke, the heads of other schools of Japanese tea ceremony also have hereditary names beginning with this kanji character. For example, the head of the Omotesenke school traditionally carries the name Sōsa, written 宗左, and the head of the Mushakōjisenke school is Sōshu, 宗守.
