= Nanshū-ji =

Buddhist temple in Osaka known for Tea Ceremonies

- 南宗寺
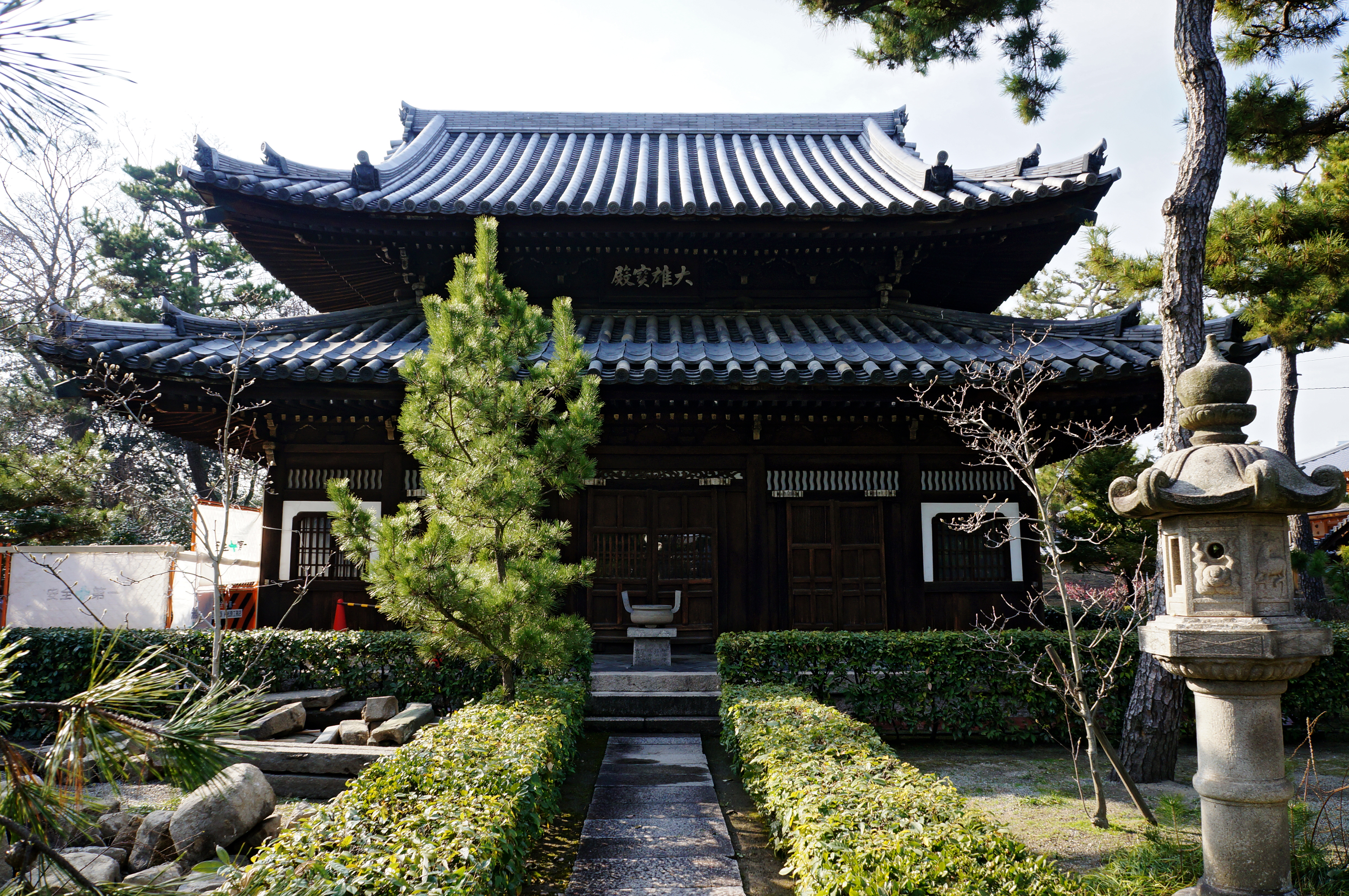
- Butsuden (ICP)

- Nanshū-ji Nanshū-ji (Japan)

Religion
- Affiliation: Buddhist
- Deity: Shaka Sanzon
- Rite: Rinzai school

Location
- Location: 1-2 Minamihatagochohigashi, Sakai-ku, Sakai-shi, Osaka-fu
- Country: Japan
- Interactive map of Nanshū-ji
- Coordinates: 34°34′8.47″N 135°28′6.52″E

Architecture
- Founder: Miyoshi Nagayoshi
- Completed: 1526, rebuilt 1557, 1619
- National Place of Scenic Beauty National Important Cultural Property

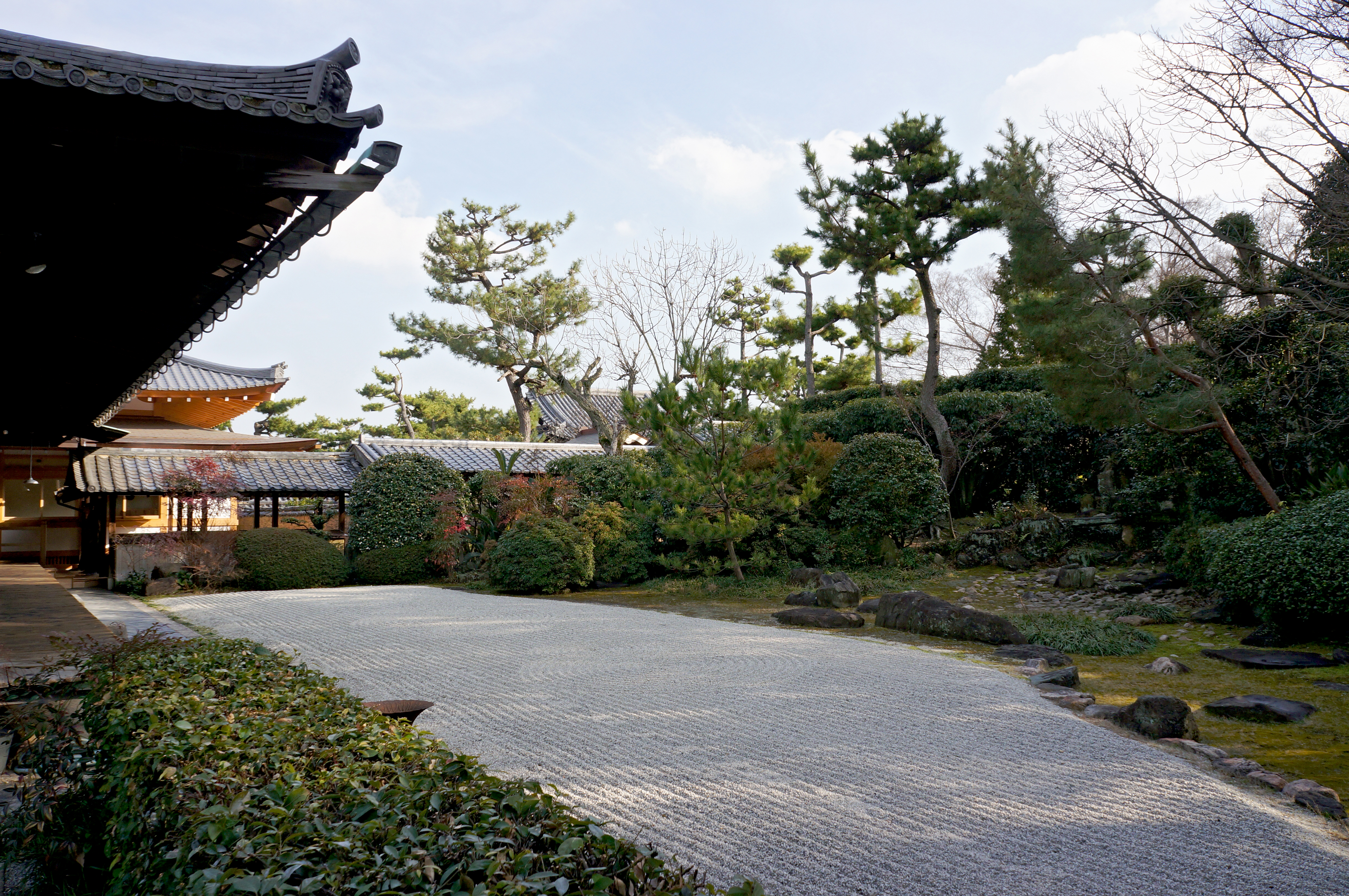
Nanshū-ji Garden

Nanshū-ji (南宗寺) is a Buddhist temple in the Sakai ward of the city of Sakai, Osaka Prefecture, Japan. It belongs to the Daitoku-ji-branch of the Rinzai school of Japanese Zen. Its main image is a Shaka Sanzon. Its Japanese garden, laid out by Furuta Oribe in 1619, is designated a National Place of Scenic Beauty. The temple is the bodaiji of the Miyoshi clan and for many schools of the Japanese tea ceremony.

== History ==
The temple was founded in August 1526 as Nanshū-an (南宗庵), a small Zen hermitage. In 1557, Miyoshi Nagayoshi, castellan of Iimoriyama Castle in Kawachi Province became the most powerful warlord in the region. He expanded the hermitage into a temple to pray for his deceased father, Miyoshi Motonaga. The temple was originally located in another part of Sakai, called Shukuin-chō. In 1573, Shogun Ashikaga Yoshiaki named it one of the Jissetsu temples under the Five Mountain System of official temples under the Ashikaga shogunate. The temple was destroyed in 1574 during Matsunaga Hisahide's struggle against Oda Nobunaga. It was rebuilt, only to be destroyed again in 1615 during the Osaka Summer Campaign between Toyotomi Hidenaga and Tokugawa Ieyasu. It was reconstructed once again under the patronage of the Tokugawa Shogunate by the noted prelate Takuan Sōhō in 1619. It was relocated to its present location at that time.

The temple once again suffered a disaster in the July 10, 1945 Bombing of Osaka in World War II. The Kaisan-dō, Hōjō, Tōshō-gū and numerous other structures were lost, but the Main Hall (built in 1654), Sanmon (built in 1647) and Karamon all survived, and are now designated as National Important Cultural Properties (ICP).

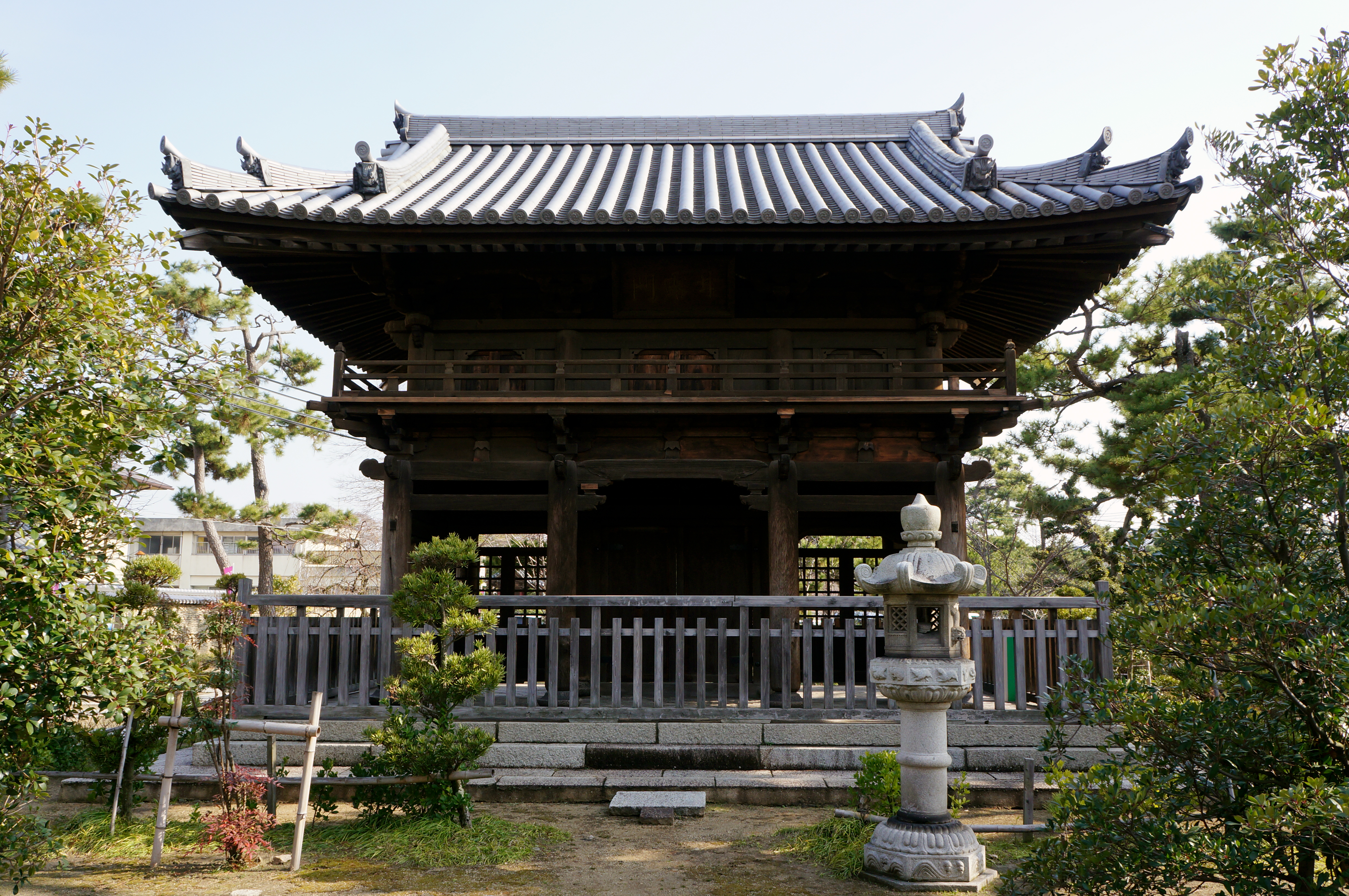
Sanmon (ICP)

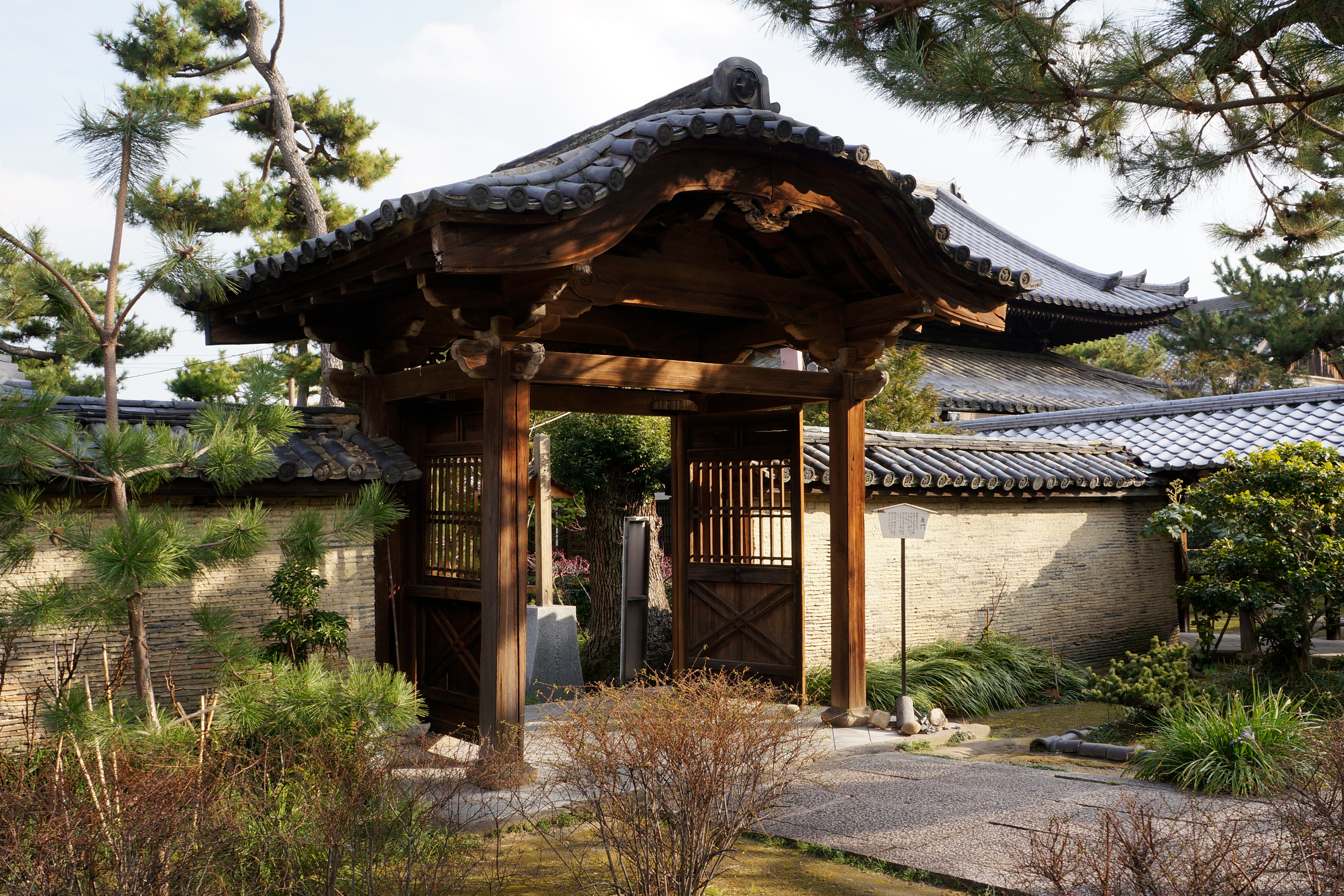
Karamon (ICP)

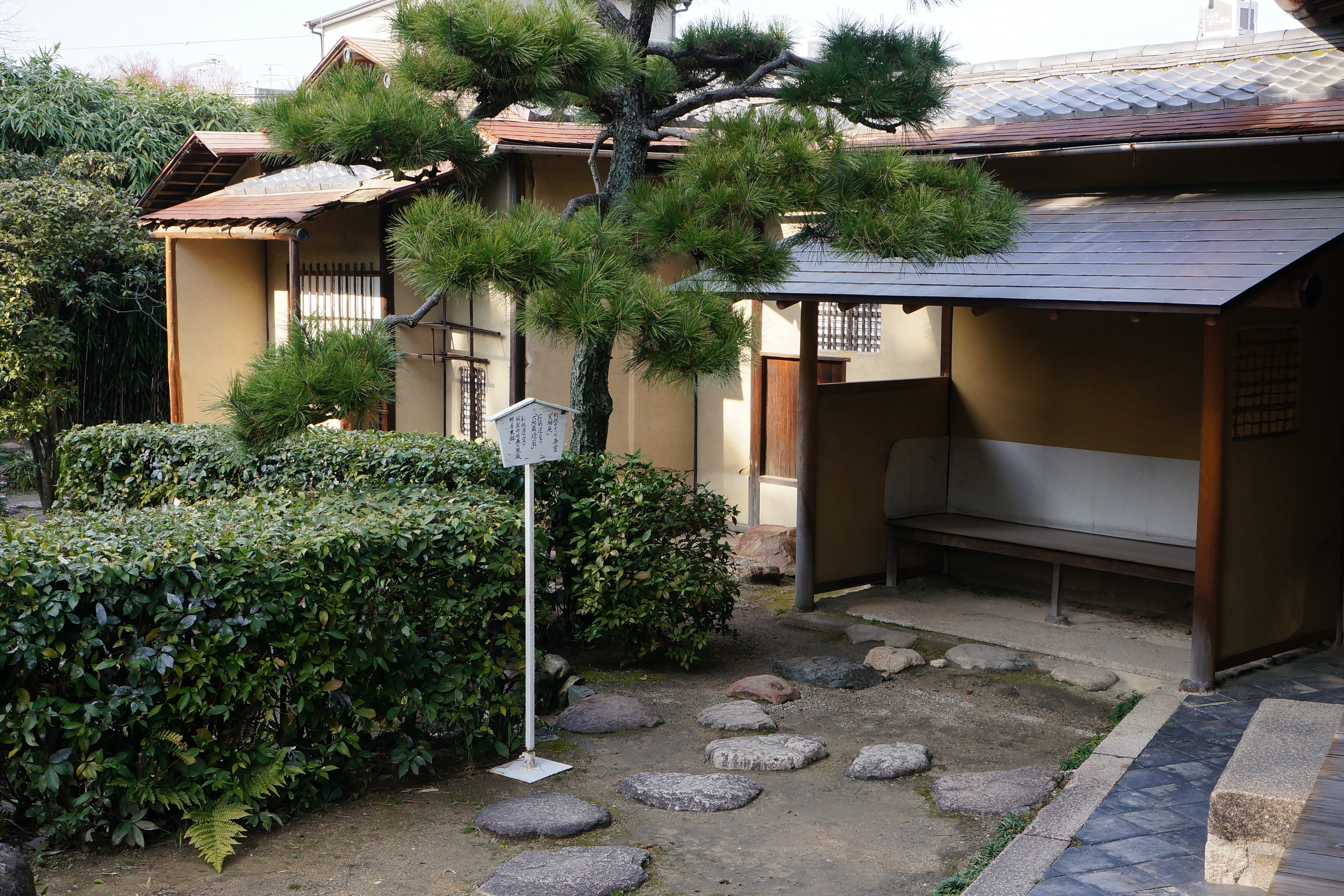
Jissoan Teahouse

The temple is a five-minute walk from Goryomae Station on the Hankai Tramway.

== Purported grave of Tokugawa Ieyasu ==
The temple has a monument which is purported to be the "true" grave of Tokugawa Ieyasu. According to the temple's legend, Tokugawa Ieyasu was forced to retreat by Sanada Yukimura during the Siege of Osaka, and he was stabbed in his palanquin by a spear wielded by Sanada's fellow Toyotomi Hideyori loyalist, Gotō Matabe, and died. His body was hidden by his retainers under floor of the Kaisan-dō at Nanshū-ji and was secretly reburied. This conspiracy theory has a number of historical issues, notably that Nanshū-ji had already been burned down and Gōtō Matabe is known to have been killed in combat before the alleged events took place. However, the legend has had considerable longevity, and in 1967, Keijirō Miki, a noted master of the Hokushin Ittō-ryū school of Japanese swordsmanship (and himself a descendant of the Mito Tokugawa clan, built a monument inscribed "Tōshō-gū Tokugawa Ieyasu Tomb" on the site of the Tōshō-gū shrine that was once located at this temple.

== Nanshū-ji garden ==
The dry landscape garden located outside the abbot's chamber is thought to date from the temple's reconstruction by Takuan Sōhō. It makes use of the rising terrain to incorporate a dry waterfall with an “upstream” stone bridge and a bed of white stones in the foreground to emphasize the arrangement of stones in the center. It is a designated National Place of Scenic Beauty.

== Cemetery ==
Nanshū-ji is the bodaiji of the Miyoshi clan, who were prominent Sengoku period warlords. However, the temple is more known for its connections with the Japanese tea ceremony. Although Sen no Rikyū's official grave is at Jukōin temple in the Daitoku-ji compound in Kyoto, he has another grave at Nanshū-ji. Rikyū lived for many years in Sakai. The tomb of fellow tea masters and Sakai merchants Takeno Jōō and Tsuda Sōgyū are also at Nanshū-ji. The various schools of the Japanese tea ceremony, including the Omotesenke, Urasenke and Mushakōjisenke also have tombs at this cemetery.

The tomb of Utagawa Yoshitaki, an ukiyoe artist noted for his depictions of kabuki actors, is also located at Nanshū-ji.

== See also ==
- List of Places of Scenic Beauty of Japan (Ōsaka)
