= Sen Sōsa =

Sen Sōsa (千宗左) is the name given to the iemoto of the Omotesenke line of the three Sen families/houses (san-Senke) of Japanese tea ceremony, whose common family founder is Sen no Rikyū. Sen is the family name; Sōsa is the hereditary name of the iemoto in this line. The first in the line to use the hereditary name was Sen no Rikyū's great-grandson, known as Kōshin Sōsa (1613–1672), the third son of Sen no Sōtan, who inherited the main house in Kyoto from his father, Sōtan, and thus became the first generation in the line of the family that eventually came to be known as the Omotesenke ("front Sen house/family").

Similarly, Sen Sōshitsu is the hereditary name of the iemoto in the Urasenke line of the three Sen families/houses, and Sen Sōshu is the name of the iemoto in the Mushakōjisenke line.

== Bibliography ==
- Daijirin, 2nd Ed.
- Daijisen, 1st. Ed.
- Kōjien, 5th Ed.
