= Schools of Japanese tea =

Manners of Japanese tea ceremonies

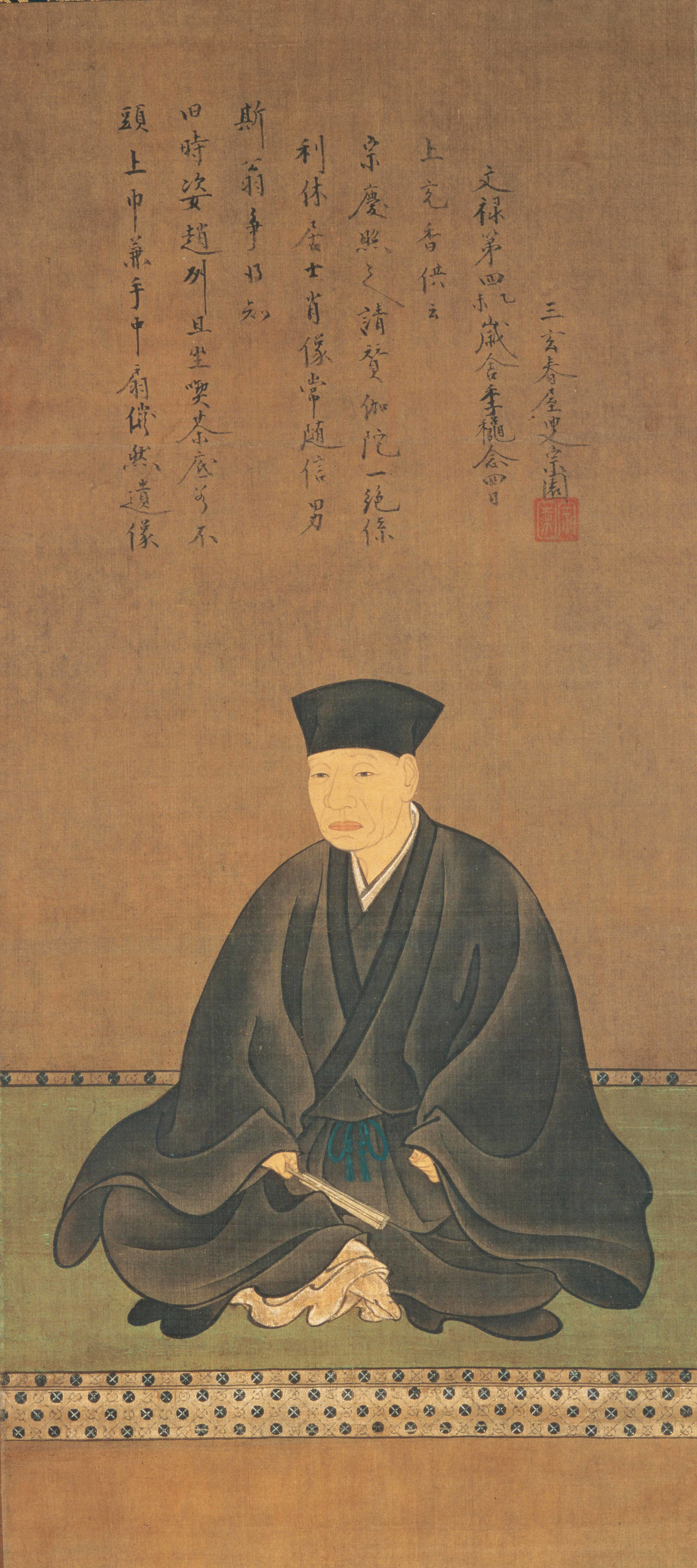
Sen no Rikyū, who perfected the wabi-cha manner of tea and was the founder of the Omotesenke, Urasenke, and Mushakojisenke tea families (portrait by Hasegawa Tōhaku)

"Schools of Japanese tea" refers to the various lines or "streams" of Japanese tea ceremony. The word "schools" here is an English rendering of the Japanese term 'ryūha' (流派).

== San-Senke ==
There are three historical households (家) dedicated to developing and teaching the style of tea ceremony developed by Sen no Rikyū, the 16th century tea master from whom they are directly descended. They are known collectively as the san-Senke (三千家, "three Sen houses/families"), and consist of the Omotesenke, Urasenke, and Mushakōjisenke schools of tea.

Another line, which was located in Sakai and therefore called the Sakaisenke (堺千家), was also descended from the original Senke (Sen house). Rikyū's natural son, Sen no Dōan, took over as head of the Sakaisenke after his father's death, but the Sakaisenke soon disappeared as Dōan had no offspring or successor. The school named Edosenke (江戸千家; "Edo Sen house/family") is not descended by blood from the Sen family; its founder, Kawakami Fuhaku (1716–1807), became a tea master under the 7th generation head of the Omotesenke line, and eventually set up a tea house in Edo (Tokyo), where he devoted himself to developing the Omotesenke style of tea ceremony in Edo.

The san-Senke arose from the fact that three of the four sons of Genpaku Sōtan (Sen no Rikyū's grandson) inherited or built a tea house, and assumed the duty of passing forward the tea ideals and tea methodology of their great-grandfather, Sen no Rikyū. Kōshin Sōsa inherited Fushin-an (不審菴) and became the head (iemoto) of the Omotesenke line; Sensō Sōshitsu inherited Konnichi-an (今日庵) and became iemoto of the Urasenke line; and Ichiō Sōshu built Kankyū-an (官休庵) and became iemoto of the Mushakōjisenke line. The names of these three family lines came about from the locations of their estates, as symbolized by their tea houses: the family in the front (omote), the family in the rear (ura), and the family on Mushakōji Street.

The style of tea ceremony considered to have been perfected by Sen no Rikyū and furthered by Sen Sōtan is known as wabi-cha. The san-Senke have historically championed this manner of tea.

Schools that developed as branches or sub-schools of the san-Senke, or separately from them, are typically entitled with the suffix "~ryū" (from ryūha), which may be translated as "school" or "style."

== Buke-cha ==
As opposed to the wabi-cha manner of tea ceremony, another style of tea ceremony, called buke-cha (武家茶, "warrior household tea") (also referred to as daimyo-cha (大名茶)) exists, the name referring to the manner of tea ceremony practiced by members of the warrior class mainly during the Edo period. In many cases, the daimyo of a domain would decide upon a certain official style of tea ceremony, which would be the style practiced in his domain. Generally, tea ceremony teachers were given the responsibility for teaching this style, but there were some daimyo who themselves possessed deep knowledge of tea ceremony.

Some of the main buke-cha styles are the Uraku, Sansai, Oribe, Enshū, Ueda Sōko, Sekishū, Chinshin, Fumai, Ogasawara (Ogasawara family), and Oie (Ando family). Among these, the Sekishū, whose founder served as tea ceremony instructor to the shōgun, developed a notably large number of branches, and spread widely into warrior society.

== Current schools ==
- Anrakuan-ryū (安楽庵流) (founder: Anrakuan Sakuden, 1554–1642)
- Chinshin-ryū (鎮信流) (founder: Matsura Chinshin, 1622–1703, who was magistrate of Hizen Hirado, present-day Hirado in Nagasaki Prefecture).
  The school takes after the "warrior-house style of tea" (buke-cha) that was promoted by the daimyo Katagiri Sekishū. The school is also known as the Sekishū-ryū Chinshin-ha (Chinshin branch of the Sekishū school).
- Edosenke-ryū (江戸千家流) (founder: Kawakami Fuhaku, 1716–1807)
- Enshū-ryū (遠州流) (founder: Kobori Masakazu, also known as Kobori Enshū, 1579–1647). One of the foremost disciples of Furuta Oribe, Kobori Enshū was tasked as the official tea instructor for the second and third shōgun of the Tokugawa, Hidetada and Iemitsu.
- Fujibayashi-ryū (藤林流) (also known as Sekishū-ryū Sōgen-ha; see Sekishū-ryū below)
- Fuhaku-ryū (不白流) (founder: Kawakami Fuhaku). This school, also called the Omotesenke Fuhaku-ryū, evolved after the death of Kawakami Fuhaku, when this faction split from the Edosenke school that he had founded.
- Hayami-ryū (速水流) (founder: Hayami Sōtatsu, 1727–1809, who learned tea under the 8th Urasenke iemoto, Yūgensai, and was allowed by him to found a school of his own in Okayama)
- Higo-koryū (肥後古流) (The word "Higo" refers to present-day Kumamoto Prefecture; 'koryū' means "old school").
  One of the schools of tea traditionally followed by members of the old Higo domain, it is considered to be faithful to Sen no Rikyū's tea style, and is somewhat-literally called tea of the "old school". The school has been led by three families, and therefore is divided into the following three branches:
  - Furuichi-ryū (古市流), known also as the Ogasawara koryū (小笠原家古流) (see below).
  - Kobori-ryū (小堀流)
  - Kayano-ryū (萱野流)
- Hisada-ryū (久田流)
- Hosokawasansai-ryū (細川三斎流)
- Horinouchi-ryū (堀内流)
- Kobori Enshū-ryū (小堀遠州流) (founder: Kobori Masakazu (Kobori Enshū), 1579–1647, and passed down through Enshū's brother Kobori Masayuki, 1583–1615) Fuyuko Kobori (小堀芙由子) is the 17th generation head of the Kobori Enshu School of Tea.
- Kogetsu Enshū-ryū Zen Sadō (壺月遠州流禅茶道) (honorary founder: Watanabe Kaigyoku, 1872–1933). Watanabe, whose religious name was Kogetsu Taiyo, served as spiritual teacher to Aoyogi Kankō (1894-1983), a student of Enshū-ryū. Kankō, following his teacher's advice, set out to found a new school stressing aspects of spiritual practice. This he named Kogetsu Enshū-ryū after Watanabe. Among the schools of warrior tea, Kogetsu Enshū-ryū is particularly noted for its simplicity, and for body usage having much in common with martial arts.
- Matsuo-ryū (松尾流) (founder: Matsuo Sōji, 1677–1752, great grandson of a close disciple of Sen no Sōtan who had the same name, Matsuo Sōji). The founder of the Matsuo school hailed from Kyoto and learned tea under the 6th Omotesenke iemoto, Kakukakusai. He later settled in Nagoya, where the Matsuo school is centered. A number of the successive Matsuo-ryū iemoto in history have apprenticed under the "reigning" Omotesenke iemoto.
- Mitani-ryū (三谷流)
- Miyabi-ryū (雅流)
- Nara-ryū (奈良流)
- Ogasawara koryū (小笠原古流) (founder: Furuichi Tanehide/In'ei, 1439–1505, a warrior and devout Buddhist of Nara). Together with his brother, Furuichi Tanehide became a tea ceremony disciple of Murata Shukō, who is considered the "father" of the chanoyu style.
  The Furuichis served as chanoyu experts for the Ogasawara family, lords of the Kokura fief. They lost their position with the Ogasawaras when the feudal system was abolished (c. 1868), but the Ogasawara's continued to support their chanoyu. The present head of the Ogasawara koryū is Ogasawara Nagamasa (Shōkōsai (菖滉斎)), the 33rd generation in his family, once lords of the Kokura fief. Followers of the Ogasawara koryū are centered in Kokura, and their organization is called the Mitokukai (未徳会).
- Oie-ryū (御家流) (founder: the feudal lord Andō Nobutomo, 1671–1732). The school traces its roots to Sen no Rikyū, and from Rikyū as follows: Hosokawa Sansai, Ichio Iori, Yonekitsu Michikata (1646–1729), and then Andō Nobutomo. In the Edo period, the Tokugawa shōgun allowed the Andō family the right to conduct official celebratory ceremonies, and the family was known as etiquette authorities.
- Oribe-ryū (織部流) (founder: Furuta Shigenari, also known as Furuta Oribe). According to the Japanese tea historian Tsutsui Hiroichi, after the death of Sen no Rikyū, his chadō follower Furuta Oribe succeeded him as the most influential tea master in the land.
  Oribe was chadō officer for the second Tokugawa shōgun, Tokugawa Hidetada, and had a number of notable chadō disciples, foremost of whom was Kobori Enshū. For political reasons, Oribe was ordered to commit seppuku (ritual suicide), and consequently his family did not become an official tea-teaching family.
  Through the succeeding generations, the family head held the position of karō (intendant) to the daimyo headquartered at Oka Castle in present-day Ōita Prefecture, Kyūshū. With the Meiji Restoration in the late 19th century, and the family's consequent loss of its hereditary position, the 14th-generation family head, Furuta Sōkan, went to the new capital, Tokyo, to attempt to reestablish the Oribe school of tea. Today, Kyūshū and especially Ōita have the highest concentration of followers of this school.
- Rikyū-ryū (利休流)
- Sakai-ryū (堺流)
- Sansō-ryū (山荘流) (founded in the Shōwa era by Takaya Sōhan (1851–1933)).
- Sekishū-ryū (石州流). The school developed by the daimyo Katagiri Sadamasa (also known as Katagiri Sekishū) (1605–1673), nephew of Katagiri Katsumoto and second-generation lord of the Koizumi Domain. Sekishū was chanoyu teacher to the fourth Tokugawa shōgun, Tokugawa Ietsuna, and his chanoyu style therefore became popular among the feudal ruling class of Japan at the time. The Sekishū-ryū school of chanoyu was passed forward by his direct descendants, and also through his talented chanoyu followers who became known as the founders of branches (派, -ha) of the Sekishū school.
  - Sekishū-ryū Chinshin-ha (石州流鎮信派) (see Chinshin-ryū above)
  - Sekishū-ryū Fumai-ha (石州流不昧派) (founder: the daimyo Matsudaira Harusato, also known as Matsudaira Fumai, 1751–1818).
  - Sekishū-ryū Ikei-ha (石州流怡渓派) (founder: the Rinzai Zen sect priest Ikei Sōetsu, 1644–1714, founder of the Kōgen'in sub-temple at Tōkaiji temple in Tokyo). He studied chanoyu under Katagiri Sekishū. His chanoyu pupil, Isa Kōtaku (1684–1745), whose family was in charge of the Tokugawa government's tea houses, founded the Sekishū-ryū Isa-ha (石州流伊佐派). Furthermore, the Ikei-ha chanoyu style that spread among people in Tokyo was referred to as 'Edo Ikei', and that which spread among people in the Echigo (present-day Niigata Prefecture) region was referred to as 'Echigo Ikei'.
  - Sekishū-ryū Ōguchi-ha (石州流大口派)
  - Sekishū-ryū Shimizu-ha (石州流清水派)
  - Sekishū-ryū Sōgen-ha (石州流宗源派) (founder: Fujibayashi Sōgen, 1606–1695, chief retainer of the daimyo Katagiri Sekishū).
  - Sekishū-ryū Nomura-ha (石州流野村派)
- Sōhen-ryū (宗偏流) (founder: Yamada Sōhen, 1627–1708, one of the four close disciples of Sen no Sōtan)
- Sōwa-ryū (宗和流) (founder: Kanamori Sōwa, also known as Kanamori Shigechika, 1584–1656)
- Ueda Sōko-ryū (上田宗箇流)
- Undenshindō-ryū (雲傳心道流) (founder: Niinuma Chinkei, who was a follower of Yamaoka Tesshū, 1836–1888)
- Uraku-ryū (有楽流) (founder: Oda Nagamasu [Urakusai])
- Yabunouchi-ryū (薮内流) (founder: Yabunouchi Kenchū Jōchi, 1536–1627, who, like Sen no Rikyū, learned chanoyu from Takeno Jōō). A mix of wabi-cha style and the buke-cha style of Furuta Oribe. Since the school's head family, the Yabunouchi family, is based at Nishinotoin-dori Street, Shimogyo Ward, Kyoto City, it is commonly called the Lower (shimo) School, as opposed to the Sansenke schools (Omotesenke, Urasenke, and Mushakojisenke) located in Kamigyo Ward and known as the Upper (kami) Schools.
- Yōken-ryū (庸軒流) (founder: Fujimura Yōken, 1613–1699, one of the four close disciples of Sen no Sōtan)
