= Yamanoue Sōji =

Japanese tea master

Yamanoue Sōji (山上宗二; 1544–1590) was a Japanese tea master during the late Sengoku period and early Azuchi-Momoyama period.

Originally a merchant from Sakai, he became a famous disciple of Sen no Rikyū and wrote the chronicle Yamanoue Sōji ki (山上宗二記), which gives commentary about Rikyū's teachings and the state of chanoyu at the time of its writing. In it he also elaborates on the principle of ichi-go ichi-e (一期一会 "one time, one meeting").

He later entered into the service of the Later Hōjō lords of Odawara. The clan, however, fell from power after their opposition to lord Toyotomi Hideyoshi in the Siege of Odawara (1590). Toyotomi Hideyoshi sentenced Yamanoue Sōji to have his ears and nose cut off and was then decapitated. One year later, his master was also sentenced to death and had to commit ritual suicide.

== Literary significance ==
The Yamanoue Sōji-ki remains one of the most important historical documents of the Japanese tea ceremony. Multiple manuscript copies exist, with the version addressed to Iwaya-ji temple in Izumo Province dated Tenshō 16 (1588) considered to be in Sōji's own hand and housed in the Omotesenke collection.

== Memorial ==
A memorial stone for Yamanoue Sōji stands at Sōun-ji temple in Hakone, near the site of his execution.

== In popular culture ==
He was portrayed in the 1989 movies Rikyu by Hisashi Igawa, and Death of a Tea Master by Kei Kumai.

Hyouge Mono (へうげもの Hepburn: Hyōge Mono, lit. "Jocular Fellow") is a Japanese manga written and illustrated by Yoshihiro Yamada. It was adapted into an anime series in 2011, and includes a fictionalized depiction of Yamanoue Sōji's life and execution.
