= Chamei =

Japanese tea term

Chamei (literally, "tea name") is a Japanese word that may refer to the name given to a particular blend of powdered green tea (matcha) or to the name bestowed on an advanced practitioner of Japanese tea ceremony. In the first case, the word is written with the kanji 茶; in the second case,お茶.

== Names of tea blends ==
Blends of matcha are given names (茶銘) either by the producing plantation, shop, or creator of the blend, or by the grand master of a particular tea tradition. When a blend is named by the grand master of some tea ceremony lineage, it becomes known as the master's konomi, or favoured blend.

The custom of giving names to tea blends began around the end of the Muromachi period (circa mid-16th century), with the master tea manufacturers (chashi) in the highly reputed tea-growing district of Uji south of Kyoto.

== Names of tea practitioners ==
A practitioner of tea ceremony may be granted a name (茶名) by which he or she is known in the tea world. The procedure and requirements vary by school, but generally only advanced students who have been licensed to take students of their own, and may thus be addressed as sensei, are given a tea name. The tea name as a rule is chosen and bestowed by the school's grand master, or iemoto, and is recorded on a certificate.

Tea names are often poetic. They may incorporate the names of animals (crane, for example), trees or flowers, natural phenomena (seasons, wind, the moon), or personal characteristics ("quiet," "peaceful"), or may be based on Buddhist teachings. If the person has a given name that is written in kanji, one of the characters in the chamei may be borrowed from that name.

Historically, the convention for chamei has been to begin with the character 宗, pronounced "sō". Therefore, chamei are often referred to as sōmei.
