= Urasenke =

One of the main schools of Japanese tea ceremony

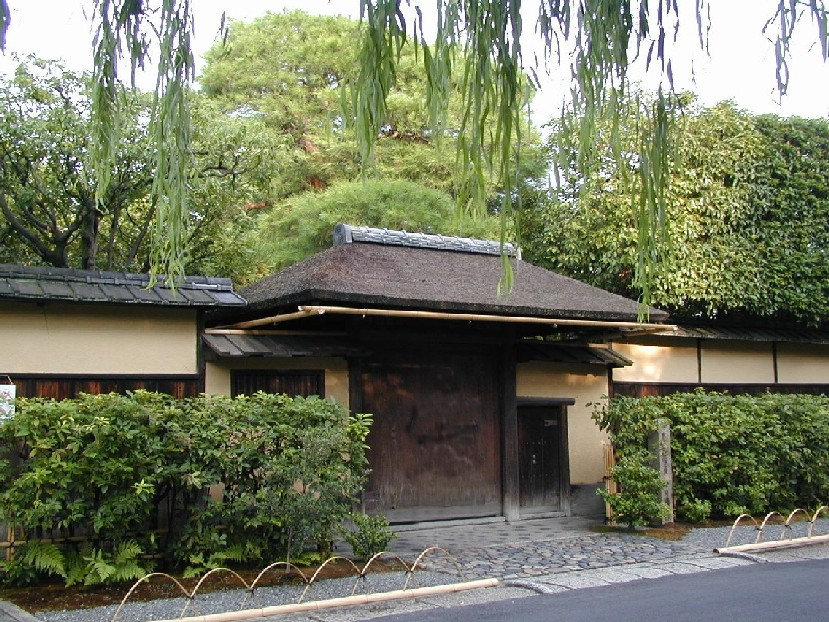
The Kabutomon gate to the historical Urasenke Konnichian estate in Kyoto

Urasenke (裏千家) is one of the main schools of Japanese tea ceremony. Along with Omotesenke and Mushakōjisenke, it is one of the three lines of the Sen family descending from Sen no Rikyū, which together are known as the san-Senke or the "three Sen houses/families" (三千家).

The name "Urasenke", literally meaning "rear Sen house/family", came into existence due to the location of the homestead of this line of the Sen family in relation to what was originally the frontmost house (the omote) of the Sen estate. The other main schools of Japanese tea ceremony, Omotesenke and Mushakōjisenke, also follow this naming convention, with the former meaning "front Sen house/family", and the latter derived from the street name of the family's homestead, Mushakōji.

== History ==
The three Sen houses derive from descendants of Sen no Rikyū, who was active during the Azuchi-Momoyama period and is the most historically important figure within Japanese tea ceremony.

Rikyū's hometown was Sakai, in the province of Izumi (in present-day Osaka Prefecture). However, as his activities became centered in Kyoto, he kept a house in Kyoto. He also had his adopted son-in-law, Sen Shōan, who was married to his daughter Okame, move from Sakai to Kyoto, leaving his natural son, Sen Dōan, to tend the family home and business in Sakai. This represents the origin of the two branches of the Sen family (Senke) referred to as the Sakai-Senke and Kyō-Senke.

The Kyō-Senke, headed by Sen Shōan, eventually settled in a house located on Ogawa Street, in the neighborhood of Honpō-ji temple; the house and property representing the original Sen estate in Kyoto. Following the death of Rikyū, both Sen Dōan of the Sakai-Senke and Sen Shōan of the Kyō-Senke, inevitably caught up in the wrath of Toyotomi Hideyoshi which had been the reason for Rikyū's self-immolation, were in danger of also losing their lives, and so, to protect their homes and families, they went into hiding. After a number of months, however, both were able to return home.

Sen Dōan, still living in Sakai, left no successors to carry on the Sakai-Senke. Sen Shōan, however, upon returning home to Kyoto, already had a son born of himself and Okame, Sen Sōtan, to succeed him as head of the Kyō-Senke.

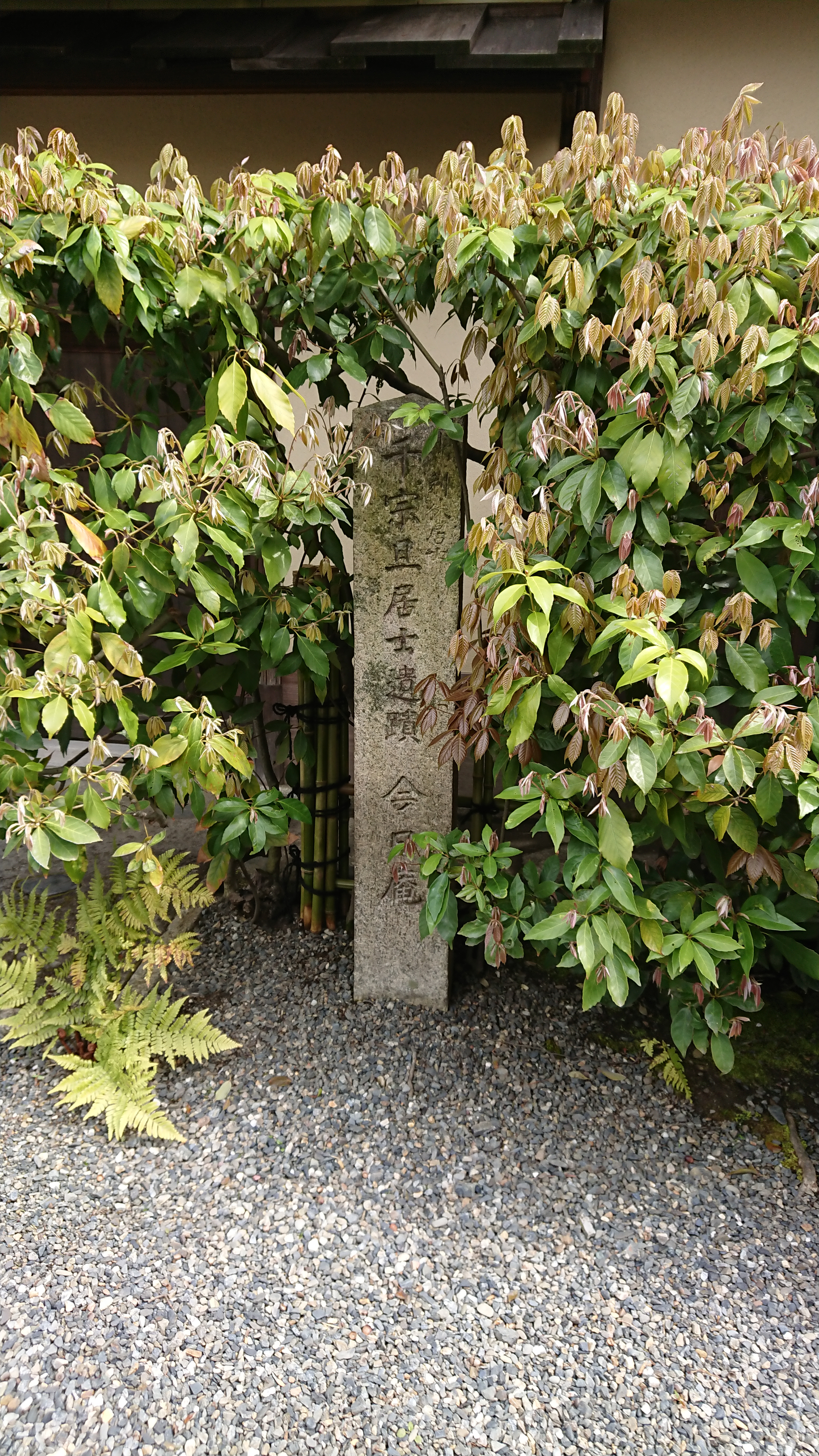
Stile beside the Kabutomon gate to the historical Urasenke estate, marking this as the site of Sen Sōtan's Konnichian

Sōtan had five offspring: the elder two, Kan'ō Sōsetsu (?-1652) and Ichiō Sōshū (1605-1676), were his sons born of his first wife. However, following her death, Sōtan remarried, having two sons (Kōshin Sōsa (1613-1672) and Sensō Sōshitsu (1622-1697)) and a daughter (Kure, dates unknown) by his second wife. His first and second sons, Kan'ō Sōsetsu and Ichiō Sōshū, began living independently when they were young men, with his fourth son, Sensō Sōshitsu, also leaving the family as a young man to train as an apprentice under a local doctor named Noma Gentaku. Due to the untimely death of Gentaku, however, Sensō returned home in 1645, and thereafter, with his father Sōtan's support, trained as a chanoyu expert, similarly to his older brother, Kōshin Sōsa, the heir to the family.

Around the year 1646, when Sōtan was roughly 68 years old, he gave up his headship of the family to Kōshin Sōsa, and moved into quarters which had been built at the rear of the house, including a tiny tea hut known as the Konnichian (今日庵, "Hut of This Day"). Sōtan's retirement quarters became Sensō's home base, with Sensō eventually becoming heir to the property.

Sōtan found employment for his eldest son, Ichiō Sōshū, with the Maeda clan of the Kaga domain, but Ichiō soon quit his position with the Maeda, leading to Sōtan disinheriting Ichiō. Sōtan's second son, Kan'ō Sōsetsu, had in contrast been adopted by the Yoshioka family in Kyoto, known for specialising in lacquerware under their business name of Yoshimonjiya. During this period, Kan'ō went by the name Yoshioka Kan'uemon. In his later life, however, Kan'ō returned to the Sen family, establishing a tea room named "Kankyuan" at his residence on Mushakōji street, and retrained as a chanoyu expert. With this, the direct descendants of Sen no Rikyū branched into the three lines of both the Sen family and schools of tea ceremony known as the san-Senke today.

Before the Meiji Restoration (1868), the heads of the three families served as chadō magistrates under various daimyō, respectively receiving a yearly stipend from them as payment for their services. Sensō Sōshitsu, fourth son of the family and leader of the branch that would eventually be known as the Urasenke, served the Maeda clan of Kaga. In generations following this, the head of the Urasenke family also served as a chadō magistrate for the Hisamatsu clan of the Iyo domain (present day Ehime Prefecture), as well as serving as caretaker to the clan's Kyoto residence. The eleventh generation head of the family, Gengensai (1810–77), born as the fifth son of a minor daimyō named Matsudaira Noritomo of the Mikawa Okudono domain, married into the Urasenke family, whilst also serving the Owari branch of the Tokugawa family. However, following the fall of the Tokugawa shogunate in 1868, the daimyō lost their positions, and the hereditary stipends which the three Sen families had been receiving came to an end. It was after this, and the loss of their positions serving the daimyō, that the Sen families established their iemoto system.

The entire historical Urasenke estate, located in the Kamigyō-ku ward of Kyoto, is referred to by the name of its representative tea room, the Konnichian.

== Headmasters (iemoto) ==
All three major schools of Japanese tea ceremony share their first three generations of headmasters, known as the iemoto. Sen no Rikyū is their mutual first generation and family founder (祖), with his adopted son-in-law, Sen Shōan as their shared second generation iemoto, and Sen Shōan's son, Sen Sōtan, as their shared third generation iemoto.

From the fourth generation onwards, the three family lineages divide, with the heads of each family carrying the professional hereditary name used by the successive heads of their respective family. Upon succession to the position of iemoto of the Urasenke family and its school of chadō, the new iemoto assumes the professional name of Sōshitsu, and is officially referred to as Sen Sōshitsu. The current head of the Urasenke school of tea is Zabōsai Genmoku Sōshitsu, the 16th generation of the family, and is referred to as Sen Sōshitsu XVI.

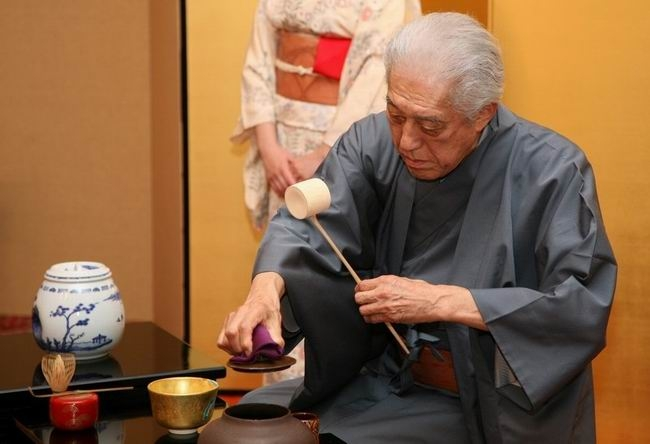
Sen Sōshitsu XV (2007)

Generation	name		religious pseudonym	
1st	Rikyū Sōeki (1522–1591)	利休 宗易	Hōsensai	抛筌斎
2nd	Shōan Sōjun (1546–1614)	少庵 宗淳		
3rd	Genpaku Sōtan (1578–1658)	元伯 宗旦	Totsutotsusai	咄々斎
4th	Sensō Sōshitsu (1622–1697)	仙叟 宗室	Rōgetsuan	臘月庵
5th	Jōsō Sōshitsu (1673–1704)	常叟 宗室	Fukyūsai	不休斎
6th	Taisō Sōshitsu (1694–1726)	泰叟 宗室	Rikkansai	六閑斎
7th	Chikusō Sōshitsu (1709–1733)	竺叟 宗室	Saisaisai	最々斎
8th	Ittō Sōshitsu (1719–1771)	一燈 宗室	Yūgensai	又玄斎
9th	Sekiō Sōshitsu (1746–1801)	石翁 宗室	Fukensai	不見斎
10th	Hakusō Sōshitsu (1770–1826)	柏叟 宗室	Nintokusai	認得斎
11th	Seichū Sōshitsu (1810–1877)	精中 宗室	Gengensai	玄々斎
12th	Jikishō Sōshitsu (1852–1917)	直叟 宗室	Yūmyōsai	又玅斎
13th	Tetchū Sōshitsu (1872–1924)	鉄中 宗室	Ennōsai	圓能斎
14th	Sekisō Sōshitsu (1893–1964)	碩叟 宗室	Mugensai	無限斎
15th	Hansō Sōshitsu (Sen Genshitsu) (1923–2025)	汎叟 宗室	Hōunsai	鵬雲斎
16th (current iemoto)	Genmoku Sōshitsu (born 1956)	玄黙 宗室	Zabōsai	坐忘斎

== Urasenke Foundation ==
The Urasenke Foundation (Ippan Zaidan Hōjin Konnichian (一般財団法人今日庵)) is an incorporated foundation originally registered by the Japanese government in 1949, during the era of the 14th generation grand master of Urasenke, Tantansai. Its stated purpose is to preserve and foster the cultural heritage of Urasenke, with its activities including the maintenance and management of the Urasenke estate and cultural assets, and the support of research and public education regarding the study of tea ceremony.

Its administrative office, together with that of the Urasenke Tankōkai Federation, is located within the five story Urasenke Center building located a short distance west of the historical Urasenke compound.

=== Urasenke Center ===
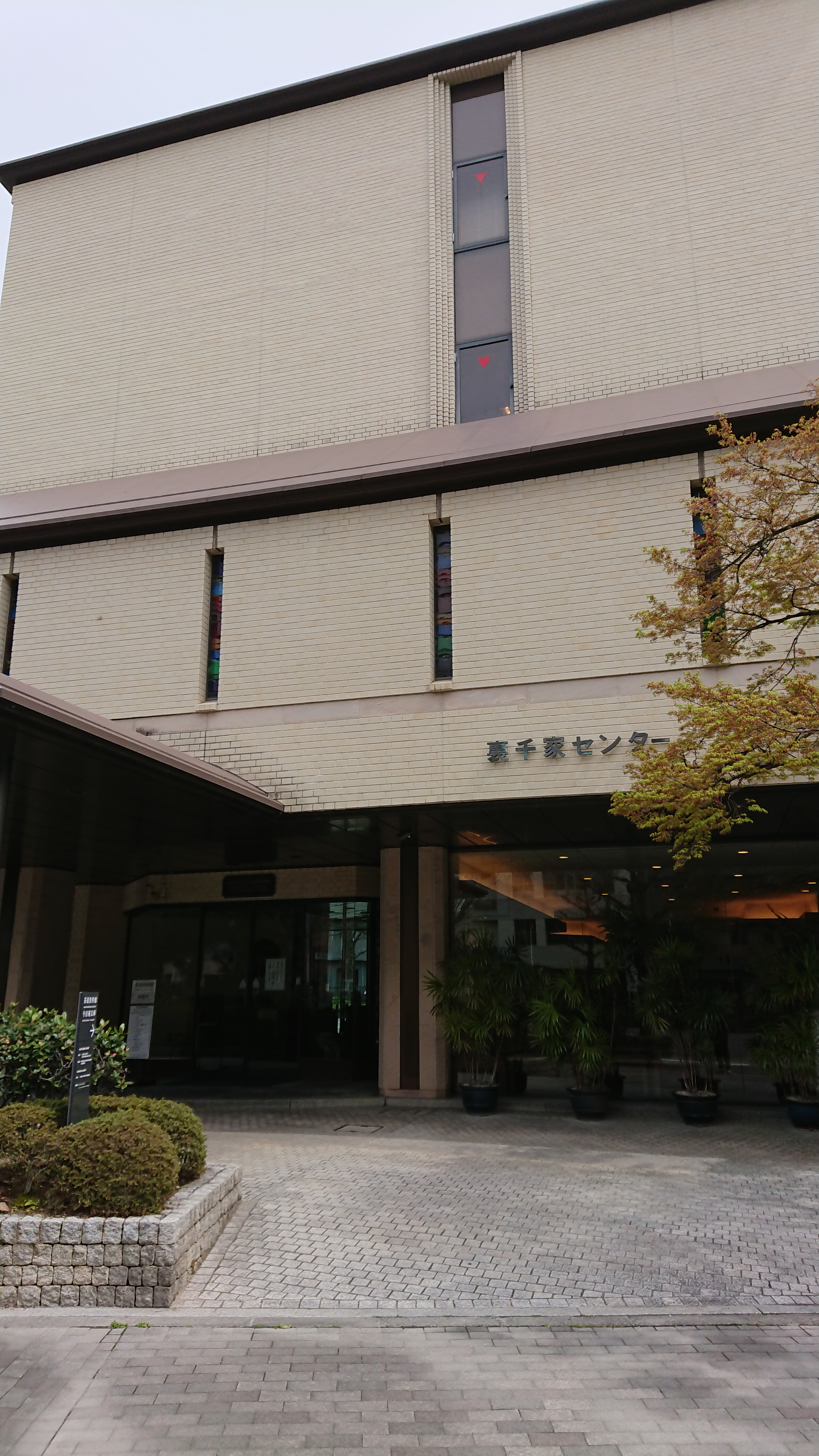
Urasenke Center building, Kyoto

=== Branches ===
The Urasenke Tokyo Branch (Urasenke Tokyo Dōjō (裏千家東京道場)) was originally established in 1957 in Tokyo's Chiyoda ward, moving to its present quarters in the Ichigaya Kaga-cho section of Tokyo's Shinjuku ward in 1995. This Urasenke facility serves as the hub of the activities sponsored by the Urasenke head house in Japan's capital. Various training courses and special events held at Urasenke Konnichian are also held here, for the convenience of participants living in Eastern Japan. The main building contains replicas of the Totsutotsusai and Kan'untei tea rooms at Konnichian. The Urasenke Tokyo Branch is the only Urasenke branch in Japan.

From the mid-1960s onwards, Sen Sōshitsu XV (Hōunsai) began to dispatch qualified Urasenke chanoyu instructors to live overseas and, operating out of Urasenke Foundation branch offices or liaison offices, to teach the growing numbers of individuals who desired to pursue the practice of chado. The dates and places to which the teachers were dispatched and thus an Urasenke branch or liaison office was established were as follows:

- 1966, September. Hawaii (Honolulu), and Boston
- 1967, September. New York
- 1969, August. Rome, Italy
- 1972, June. Munich, Germany, when Urasenke donated a tea house named "Kanshoan" (閑松)
- 1973, February. Mexico (Mexico City)
- 1973, August. Hilo, Hawaii
- 1974, March. Brisbane (liaison office), Australia
- 1974, November. Peru (Lima)
- 1976, April. London, England; Düsseldorf, Germany; and Paris, France
- 1976, August. Brazil (São Paulo)
- 1980, December. San Francisco, California
- 1981, February. Seattle, Washington
- 1986, May. Schwarzwald (liaison office; became Freiburg liaison office in 1997, April), Germany
- 1991, March. Moscow (liaison office), Russia
- 1991, May. Beijing (liaison office; became branch in 1993), China
- 1992, August. Tianjin (liaison office), China
- 1993, April. Vancouver (liaison office; became branch in 1994), Canada
- 1993, August. Sydney, Australia
- 1994, September. Washington D.C.
- 1997, April. Netherlands (liaison office)

=== Independently registered Urasenke Foundation corporations ===
The Urasenke Foundation of Hawaii, headquartered at the Urasenke Hawaii Branch, was established as a USA registered non-profit corporation in 1976

The Urasenke Tea Ceremony Society, Inc, headquartered at the Urasenke Chanoyu Center, was established as a USA registered non-profit corporation in 1981, when the Urasenke New York Branch moved into the newly opened Urasenke Chanoyu Center, located at 153 East 69th St. in New York.

The Urasenke Foundation of California, headquartered at the Urasenke San Francisco Branch, was founded as a USA registered non-profit organization in 1994. It is generally known as Urasenke Foundation San Francisco.

== Urasenke Tankōkai ==
The Urasenke Tankōkai (裏千家淡交会) is the membership organization for Urasenke teachers and students. It was initiated in 1940 by the fourteenth-generation head of Urasenke, Tantansai (1893-1964), with the aim of unifying and encouraging the practitioners of Urasenke chadō. In 1953, it was registered by the Ministry of Education and Culture as a not-for-profit incorporated association (shadan hōjin). It is now registered as a not-for-profit general incorporated association (ippan shadan hōjin). Its official registered name, as such, is Ippan Shadan Hōjin Chadō Urasenke Tankōkai (一般社団法人茶道裏千家淡交会). In English, it is referred to as the Urasenke Tankōkai Federation. Its stated aims are to ensure the standardization of the Urasenke chanoyu rules and tea-making procedures (temae), support research, encourage cooperation and exchange among all members, promote the practice of the principles laid down by the grand master, and expand the chadō population around the world. Also, it provides support for the purposes and activities of the Urasenke Foundation.

In Japan, the organization is divided into seventeen districts comprising 165 chapters (shibu) and 2 sub-chapters (shisho). Each district has a liaison council for the Gakkō Chadō (Tea Training in the Educational System) program sponsored by the organization. There are also 167 groups belonging to the organization's Seinenbu, or "Youth Division." These three entities organize seminars, tea gatherings, conventions, and many other activities. The central office, serving to coordinate the programs and activities of all these, is located in the Urasenke Center building at Urasenke headquarters, Kyoto. Twice a year, in the spring and autumn, it calls together a national meeting of chapter presidents, to decide upon general policies and activities. In 1999, the International Division of the Urasenke Foundation was moved under the umbrella of this office, effectively extending the organization to overseas regions. Currently there are 92 official Chadō Urasenke Tankōkai associations spread over 37 countries outside Japan.

=== Seinenbu ===
The Urasenke Tankōkai Seinenbu (裏千家淡交会青年部), or Urasenke Tankōkai Youth Division, is an organization for Urasenke chadō enthusiasts under the age of fifty. It was initiated in 1950 by the then Urasenke 15th-generation iemoto-to-be, Sen Sōkō, aiming to muster the combined power of Urasenke's youths toward rebuilding the war-torn nation. Its creed is "Train (修練) in order to better oneself; Serve (奉仕) your community; Friendship (友情) toward the world and among members." At first, the organization was called Seinenkai. This name was changed to Seinenbu in 1963. The organization's first chapters were established in Kure and Hiroshima in May, 1950. In 1966, the organization held its first National Convention, at the Kyoto International Conference Hall, at which there were over 2,200 attendees. In 1974, the organization's first chartered Urasenke Youth Ship (裏千家青年の船) friendship mission, with 418 participants, sailed to Okinawa and Hong Kong.

== Urasenke Gakuen ==
The Urasenke Gakuen Chadō Senmon Gakkō (裏千家学園茶道専門学校), or "Urasenke Gakuen Professional College of Chadō," is generally known as the Urasenke Gakuen. It is located on the same neighborhood block as the Urasenke home in Kyoto, and is the only accredited school in Japan specializing in chadō education. It had its start in 1962, as the Urasenke Chadō Kenshūjō (裏千家茶道研修所), or "Urasenke Chadō Training Institute," run by Urasenke's incorporated foundation, Zaidan Hōjin Konnichian (known in English as the Urasenke Foundation). In 1971, its name was changed to "Urasenke Gakuen," and in 1976, its name was changed again, to "Urasenke Gakuen Chadō Senmon Gakkō." In 1983, it had its new start as a registered educational foundation (学校法人), and was formally accredited as a professional college by the Ministry of Education.

The number one characteristic of this professional college is that it is a chadō training center directly connected to the Urasenke Iemoto. The current Chairman of the Urasenke Gakuen Educational Foundation, and Principal of the Urasenke Gakuen Professional College, is Masako Sen, who is married to Urasenke Iemoto Sōshitsu Sen XVI.

In addition to its regular three-year course, which is referred to as the chadō-ka (茶道科) and provides a basic, comprehensive chadō education, it also has a separate one-year course and a graduate course referred to as the kenkyūka (研究科, "research course").

Furthermore, the Urasenke Gakuen has a non-Japanese students division called the "Midorikai" (lit., "green group"). The Midorikai study program is an intensive one-year program in which the students are provided with lectures and other instruction in English.

== Urasenke in popular culture ==
- The Choose Your Own Adventure book: Mystery of Ura Senke (nº 44), by Shannon Gilligan, deals with the theft of one of the Urasenke school's most famous tea ceremony bowls, worth millions of yen on the black market. The protagonist and their friend Kenichi Doi, whose older brother Takashi is an Urasenke school apprentice, start investigating the case.
