= Sensō Sōshitsu =

17th century Japanese master of the tea ceremony

Sensō Sōshitsu (仙叟 宗室, 1622–1697), also known as Sen Sōshitsu IV (四代目千宗室), is the 4th in the hereditary series of Japanese tea masters who have been head of the Urasenke family. Although he was the first person in the Sen family to use the name "Sōshitsu" which has been the exclusive hereditary professional name of the head of the Urasenke line of the family ever since, he is counted as Sōshitsu IV to distinguish him as the 4th generation in this line, which, as do the other three lines of the Sen family, counts its founder as Sen no Rikyū.

== Biography ==
Sensō Sōshitsu was the youngest son of Sen no Sōtan; and he was a great-grandson of Sen no Rikyū. Before becoming the head of the Urasenke line of the Sen family, he studied under a physician of Kyoto named Noma Gentaku, aiming to become a physician. Due to the death of Noma, however, he returned to live with his father and concentrate on making a life of carrying on the chadō tradition of the Sen family, founded by his great-grandfather, Sen no Rikyū. Through his father's hard work and connections, he landed a position as magistrate in charge of chadō matters for the head of the wealthy Kaga domain. At first he served under Lord Maeda Toshitsune, and after Toshitsune's death, Lord Maeda Tsunatoshi, who was a great patron of the arts and provided Sensō with comfortable quarters in the town of Kanazawa. He spent a great deal of his life in Kanazawa, and his first son, who succeeded him as the fifth head of the Urasenke line of the Sen family, Fukyūsai Jōsō, was born in Kanazawa. Sensō finally retired from his position with Tsunatoshi and returned to Kyoto when he was sixty-six years old, though he continued to make visits to Kanazawa on occasion, and that is where he died on the 23rd day of the 1st month of 1697, at the age of seventy-five.

== Achievements ==
Sensō Sōshitsu is particularly remembered for his role in taking the potter Chōzaemon, who worked at the Raku family's workshop in Kyoto, to Kanazawa, and helping him to establish a kiln in the Ōhi section of town. This represented the birth of Ōhi ware pottery, an offshoot of Raku ware pottery. Also, Sensō Sōshitsu is credited with helping the kettle maker Miyazaki Kanchi to establish the Kanchi foundry in Kanazawa. In these ways, Sensō Sōshitsu made major contributions to the art of chanoyu as well as the culture of Kanazawa.
