= Sotan =

Sotan may refer to:

- Sotan, the highest point on the island of Barra Head (Berneray), Scotland
- Sotan, a 2024 TV series featuring Alyy Khan
- Sen no Sōtan (1578–1658), Japanese tea ceremony master
- Sotan Tanabe (born 1990), Japanese footballer
