= Omotesenke =

One of three main schools of Japanese tea ceremony

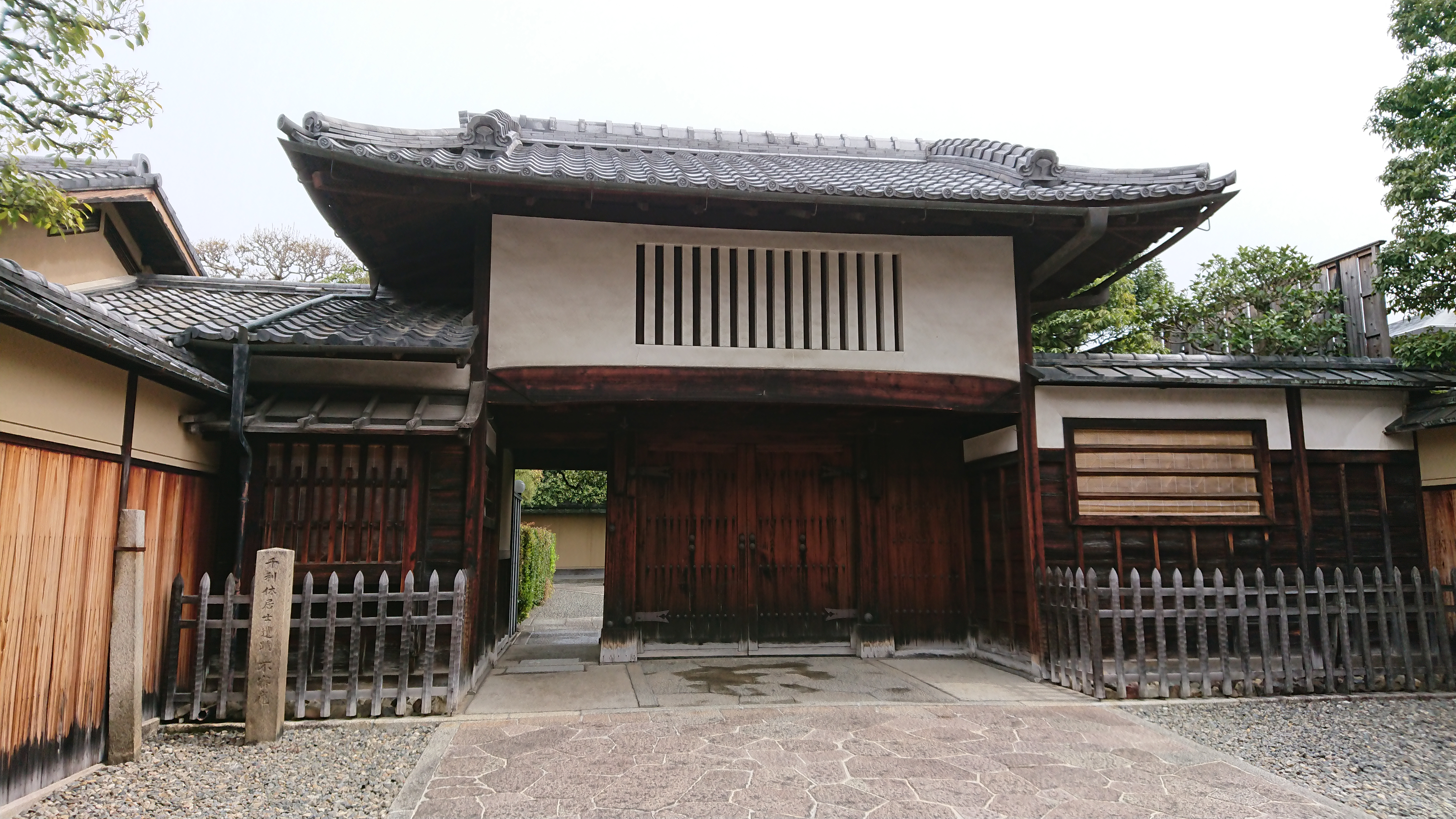
The front gate to the Omotesenke Fushin'an estate, Kyoto.

Omotesenke (表千家) is one of the schools of Japanese tea ceremony. Along with Urasenke and Mushakōjisenke, it is one of the three lines of the Sen family descending from Sen no Rikyū, which together are known as the san-Senke or "three Sen houses/families" (三千家).

The name "Omotesenke", literally meaning "front Sen house/family," came into being as a natural occurrence, because of the location of the homestead of this line of the family in relation to that of the line of the family at what originally was the rear (ura) of the Sen estate. The name "Mushakōjisenke" for the other of the three lines of the family derives from the fact that the family's homestead is located along Mushakōji street.

== History ==
The Omotesenke estate, known by the name of its representative tea room, the "Fushin-an" (不審庵), was where Sen no Rikyū's son-in-law, Sen Shōan, reestablished the Kyoto Sen household after Rikyū's death. It is located on Ogawa street in the Kamigyō ward of Kyoto.

Shōan's son Sen Sōtan soon succeeded as the family heir and head of this estate. The next heir to the estate and family tradition was Sōtan's third son, Kōshin Sōsa, counted as the fourth generation in the Omotesenke family line. Sōtan, when he was ready to retire and gave the headship of the family over to Kōshin Sōsa, established his retirement quarters on adjacent property in the north, building a tiny tea room there, the "Konnichi-an" (今日庵). Eventually, Sōtan's youngest son, Sensō Sōshitsu, inherited that part of the estate, which came to be known as the home of the Urasenke.

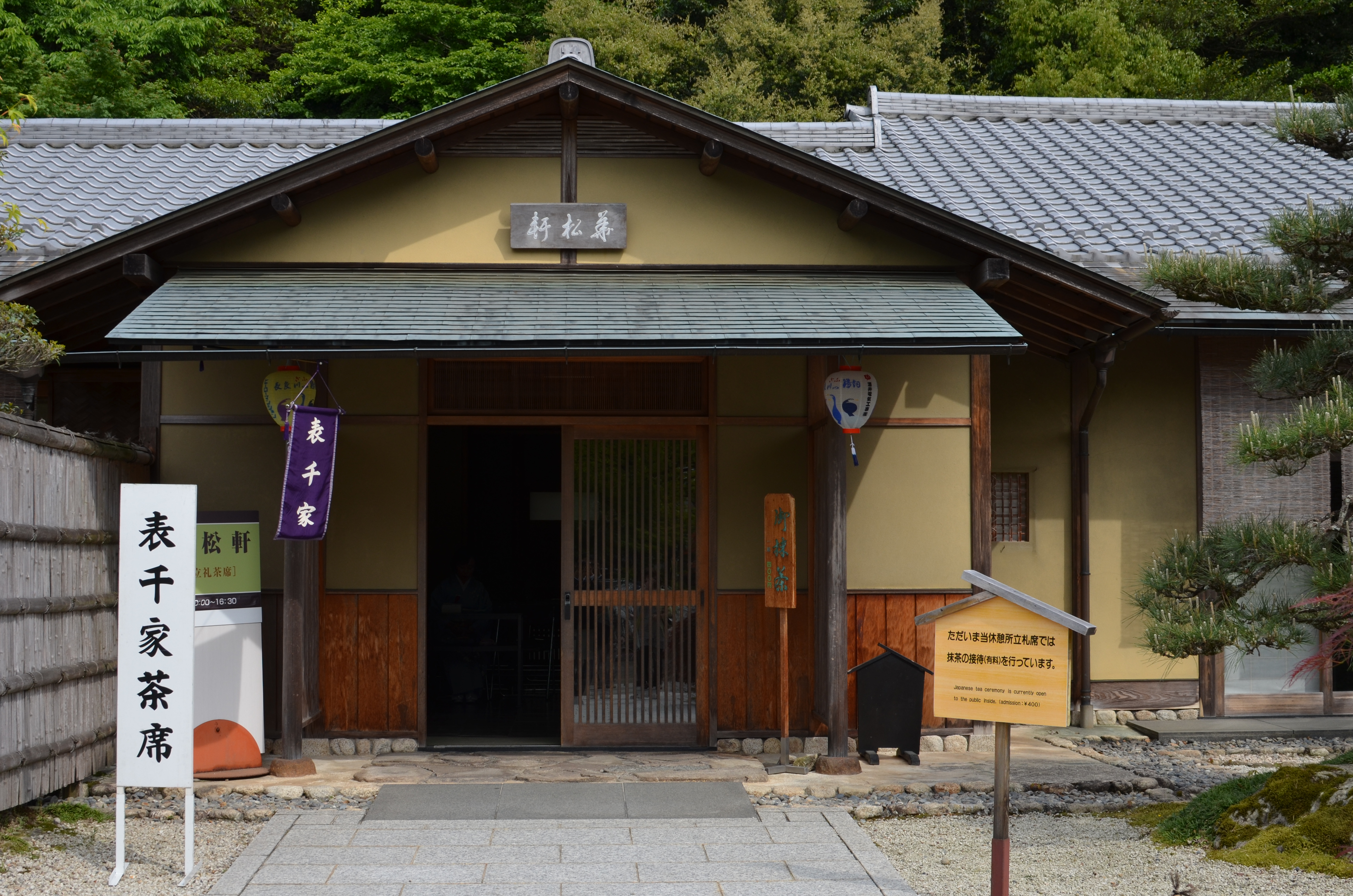
Kashō-ken (華松軒) tea house used by the Omotesenke school in Gifu, central Japan

== Style ==
There are small stylistic differences between the different schools. For example, the Omotesenke school whisks the tea less than the Urasenke school, creating less foam on the top of the tea. Also, Omotesenke uses both an untreated bamboo chasen and a susudake chasen, or darkened-bamboo tea whisk, while Urasenke uses untreated bamboo for its chasen or tea whisk.

The Fushin-an estate, where the 3rd generation, Sōtan, lived until retirement, is the home and headquarters of Omotesenke.

The Kitayama Kaikan in Kyoto is a relatively modern Omotesenke facility, where Omotesenke sponsors exhibitions, lectures, and other educational programs for the general public.

== Levels ==
Licenses or permissions are called kyojō (許状), menjō (免状) or sōden (相伝). They allow students to study certain tea procedures.

License	Requirements	Notes
Nyūmon (入門 entrance)	Starting with warigeiko (割稽古 basics) and ryakutemae, basic light tea and thick tea and charcoal procedures and knowledge of Tea Ceremony	students can apply for Nyūmon immediately or soon after starting their studies. Nyūmon and Naraigoto can be applied for at the same time.
Naraigoto (習事 things to learn)	daikazari, chasenkazari, kumiawasedate, shikumidate, nagao, bonkōgo, hanashomō, sumishomō	students can apply for Nyūmon immediately or soon after starting their studies. Nyūmon and Naraigoto can be applied for at the same time.
Kazarimono (飾物 display)	jikukazari, tsubokazari, chairekazari, chawankazari, chashakukazari,	
Satsūbako (茶通箱 tea box)	procedures using the Satsūbako	
Karamono (唐物 Chinese ware)	procedures using Chinese wares	-tea name -Kōshi (講師 teaching permission)
Daitenmoku (台天目)	procedures using the tenmokudai	
Bonten (盆点)	procedures using a square tray	Kyōju (教授 professor)
Midarekazari (乱飾)	procedures using a daisu	
Shindaisu (真台子 formal tana)	procedures using a formal daisu	

=== Warigeiko ===
The first skills a student in any Tea school learns are the warigeiko, literally divided or separate training. The warigeiko are skills practiced separately from actual temae (tea or charcoal procedures); since they form the basis of temae, they must be acquired before a student begins making tea. They include:

Basic tea room knowledge
opening and closing sliding doors; walking in the tea room; how and where to sit; how and when to bow; basic guest behaviour including use of fans
Fukusa
folding, opening and handling the fukusa
Natsume
the natsume is the first type of tea container students learn to use. Skills include how to fill the container with tea; how to pick it up, hold it, and put it down; how to purify it
Chashaku
how to handle and purify the tea scoop
Hishaku
how to handle the ladle; special movements for hot and cold water
Chasen
how to handle the tea whisk; how to whisk tea
Chakin
how to fold the tea cloth; how to use it to clean the tea bowl
Chawan
how to handle the tea bowl as both a host and a guest

== Headmasters ==
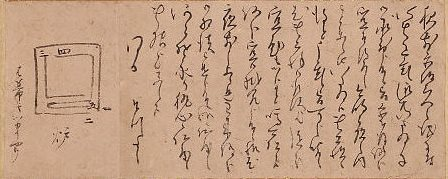
Instructions by the 8th iemoto Ken'ō Sōsa on how to clean the frame (robuchi) of the fire pit (ro)

The hereditary name of the head (iemoto) of this line of the family is Sōsa.

Generation	Personal name		Buddhist name	
1st	Rikyu Sōeki (1522-1591)	利休 宗易	Hōsensai	抛筌斎
2nd	Shōan Sōjun (1546-1614)	少庵 宗淳		
3rd	Genpaku Sōtan (1578-1658)	元伯 宗旦	Totsutotsusai	咄々斎
4th	Kōshin Sōsa (1613-1672)	江岑 宗左	Hōgensai	逢源斎
5th	Ryōkyū Sōsa (1650-1691)	良休 宗佐	Zuiryūsai	随流斎
6th	Gensō Sōsa (1678-1730)	原叟 宗左	Kakkakusai	覚々斎
7th	Ten'nen Sōsa (1705-1751)	天然 宗左	Joshinsai	如心斎
8th	Ken'ō Sōsa (1744-1808)	件翁 宗左	Sottakusai	啐啄斎
9th	Kōshuku Sōsa (1775-1825)	曠叔 宗左	Ryōryōsai	了々斎
10th	Shōō Sōsa (1818-1860)	祥翁 宗左	Kyūkōsai	吸江斎
11th	Zuiō Sōsa (1837-1910)	瑞翁 宗左	Rokurokusai	碌々斎
12th	Keiō Sōsa (1863-1937)	敬翁 宗左	Seisai	惺斎
13th	Mujin Sōsa (1901-1979)	無盡 宗左	Sokuchūsai	即中斎
14th	Sōsa (1938-)	宗左	Jimyōsai	而妙斎
15th	Sōsa (1970-)	宗左	Yūyūsai (current iemoto)	猶有斎
