= Sen Sōshu =

Professional name for Japanese tea masters

Sen Sōshu (千宗守) is the hereditary name of the head of the Mushakōjisenke school of Japanese tea ceremony, whose founder was the 16th century tea master, Sen no Rikyū.
