= List of places of scenic beauty of Japan (Ōsaka) =

This list is of the places of scenic beauty of Japan located within the Urban Prefecture of Ōsaka.

== National Places of Scenic Beauty ==
As of 1 June 2024, six Places have been designated at a national level.

Place	Municipality	Comments	Image	Coordinates	Type	Ref.
Kishiwada Castle Gardens 岸和田城庭園（八陣の庭） Kishiwada-jō teien (Hachijin-no-niwa)	Kishiwada			34°27′32″N 135°22′15″E	1	
Nanshū-ji Gardens 南宗寺庭園; Nanshūji teien	Sakai			34°34′07″N 135°28′06″E	1	
Nishiyama Family Gardens (Seiryū Gardens) 西山氏庭園（青龍庭） Nishiyama-shi teien (Seiryū-en)	Toyonaka			34°46′39″N 135°27′44″E	1	
Fumon-ji Gardens 普門寺庭園; Fumonji teien	Takatsuki			34°49′49″N 135°35′34″E	1	
Mount Minō 箕面山; Minō-yama	Minoh			34°51′01″N 135°28′08″E	3	
Ryūsen-ji Gardens 龍泉寺庭園; Ryūsenji teien	Tondabayashi			34°27′41″N 135°35′52″E	1	

== Prefectural Places of Scenic Beauty ==
As of 18 March 2024, seven Places have been designated at a prefectural level.

Place	Municipality	Comments	Image	Coordinates	Type	Ref.
Chōsan-ji Gardens 長杉寺庭園; Chōsanji teien	Nose			35°02′15″N 135°21′23″E		
Gansen-ji Gardens 願泉寺庭園; Gansenji teien	Ōsaka			34°39′22″N 135°29′40″E		
Jikō-ji 慈光寺; Jikōji	Higashiōsaka			34°40′11″N 135°40′15″E		
Mount Iwawaki 岩湧山; Iwawaki-san	Kawachinagano			34°22′27″N 135°33′03″E		
Jizō-ji 地蔵寺; Jizōji	Kawachinagano			34°24′30″N 135°35′05″E		
Shōun-ji Gardens 祥雲寺庭園; Shōunji teien	Sakai			34°34′28″N 135°28′32″E		
Iwabune-kyō 磐船峡; Iwabune-kyō	Katano			34°45′04″N 135°41′27″E		

== Municipal Places of Scenic Beauty ==
As of 1 May 2023, eleven Places have been designated at a municipal level.

Place	Municipality	Comments	Image	Coordinates	Type	Ref.
Keitaku-en 慶沢園; Keitaku-en	Osaka	in Tennōji Park		34°39′03″N 135°30′27″E		
Midōsuji Ginkgo Avenue 御堂筋銀杏並木; Midōsuji ichō namiki	Osaka			34°40′53″N 135°29′26″E		
Former Fujita Residence Gardens 旧藤田邸庭園 kyū-Fujita-tei teien	Osaka	adjacent to the Fujita Art Museum		34°41′42″N 135°31′29″E		
Inoue Family Gardens 井上家庭園; Inoue-ke teien	Osaka	in Ikuno-ku				
Katagiri Seiryūdō Gardens 片桐棲龍堂庭園; Katagiri Seiryūdō teien	Sakai			34°34′03″N 135°27′51″E		
Myōkoku-ji Gardens 妙國寺庭園; Myōkokuji teien	Sakai			34°34′52″N 135°28′53″E		
Nagao Falls 長尾の滝 慈雲尊者旧跡; Nagao no taki (Jiun Sonja kyūseki)	Higashiōsaka	associated with Jiun (慈雲); in the grounds of Tenryū-in (天龍院); also a Municipal Historic Site		34°40′25″N 135°40′00″E		
Hiraoka Plum Grove 枚岡梅林; Hiraoka bairin	Higashiōsaka			34°40′25″N 135°39′13″E		
Kōtaki-ji Precinct 光滝寺境内; Kōtakiji keidai	Kawachinagano			34°22′10″N 135°31′03″E		
Mount Ame 雨山; Ame-yama	Kumatori			34°22′05″N 135°21′57″E		
Gofū-sō Gardens 五風荘庭園; Gofūsō teien	Kishiwada			34°27′28″N 135°22′15″E		

== Registered Places of Scenic Beauty ==
As of 24 June 2024, five Monuments have been registered (as opposed to designated) as Places of Scenic Beauty at a national level.

Place	Municipality	Comments	Image	Coordinates	Type	Ref.
Izumi City Kubosō Memorial Museum of Arts Teahouse Garden 和泉市久保惣記念美術館茶室庭園; Izumi-shi Kubosō kinen bijutsukan chashitsu teien	Izumi			34°26′48″N 135°27′10″E		
Former Nakanishi Family Gardens 旧中西氏庭園 kyū-Nakanishi-shi teien	Suita			34°46′49″N 135°32′16″E		
Former Nishio Family Gardens 旧西尾氏庭園 kyū-Nishio-shi teien	Suita			34°45′23″N 135°31′24″E		
Minami Family Gardens 南氏庭園; Minami-shi teien	Hannan			34°21′34″N 135°14′23″E		
Expo Commemoration Park Japanese Garden 日本万国博覧会記念公園日本庭園; Nihon Bankoku Hakurankai kinen kōen Nihon teien	Suita			34°48′22″N 135°31′44″E		

== "Old" Prefectural Places of Scenic Beauty ==
In the 1930s, four Places were designated at a prefectural level under the 1919 Historical Sites, Places of Scenic Beauty, and Natural Monuments Preservation Law, and are now classed as "old" Prefectural Monuments (大阪府古文化紀念物).

Place	Municipality	Comments	Image	Coordinates	Type	Ref.
Settsu-kyō 摂津峡; Settsu-kyō	Takatsuki			34°52′51″N 135°35′10″E		
Mount Inunaki 犬鳴山; Inunaki-san	Izumisano			34°20′27″N 135°22′59″E		
Mount Ushitaki 牛滝山; Ushitaki-san	Kishiwada			34°22′16″N 135°26′56″E		
Kumeda-ike 久米田池; Kumeda-ike	Kishiwada	also an "old" Prefectural Historic Site		34°27′17″N 135°24′57″E		

== See also ==
- Cultural Properties of Japan
- List of Historic Sites of Japan (Osaka)
- List of parks and gardens of Osaka Prefecture
- List of Cultural Properties of Japan – paintings (Osaka)
