= Sen no Sōtan =

Sen no Sōtan (千宗旦) (1578–1658), also known as Genpaku Sōtan (元伯宗旦), was a Japanese tea ceremony master, and grandson of the famous Sen no Rikyū. He is remembered as Rikyū's third-generation successor in Kyoto through whose efforts and by whose very being, as the blood-descendant of Rikyū, the ideals and style of Japanese tea ceremony proposed by Rikyū were able to be passed forward by the family.

== Biography ==
Sōtan was the son of Sen Shōan and Okame, a daughter of Rikyū, and is counted as the third generation in the three lines of the Sen family known together as the san-Senke (see Schools of Japanese tea ceremony). He helped to popularize tea in Japan. It was in the generation of his children, Sōsa, Sōshitsu and Sōshu, that the three lines of the family—the Omotesenke, Urasenke and Mushakōjisenke—were established, with these three sons, respectively, as their heads of house. They are counted as the fourth generation in the respective lines.

He had the original tea house constructed on the north side of the Sen residence and named it name Konnichi-an (今日庵, "Hut of This Day").

At around the age of ten, he was sent to live at Daitoku-ji temple, through the wish of his grandfather, Rikyū. He lived at the sub-temple Sangen'in, under the supervision of the priest Shunoku Sōen. During the years following Rikyū's death, when the Sen family was disbanded and Sōtan's father found shelter with the daimyō Gamō Ujisato in distant Aizu Wakamatsu, Sōtan was able to stay safely at Daitoku-ji temple. When his father was at last permitted to return to Kyoto and reestablish the Kyoto Sen family, Sōtan left the priesthood and returned to his family. His father soon left the headship of the family to Sōtan, and moved out.

Sōtan had two sons by his first wife, and after her death, two more sons by his second wife. He had a falling out with his oldest son, and consequently there are only very scanty records concerning that son. Sōtan arranged for his second son, Ichiō Sōshu, to be adopted into the family of a lacquer ware artisan at a young age. Sōshu, however, later on chose to carry on the tea tradition of his forefather, Rikyū, and built a tea house where he was living at on Mushakōji street, to dedicate himself to that pursuit. He gave up the lacquer business to the lacquer ware artisan Nakamura Sōtetsu. This represents the birth of the Nakamura Sōtetsu line of lacquer ware artisans who have been responsible for much of the lacquer ware of the Sen families, as well as the birth of the Mushakōjisenke (Mushakōji Sen house/family) line of the Sen family. Meanwhile, Sōtan had his third son, Kōshin Sōsa, become heir to the Sen house, which eventually came to be referred to as the Omotesenke (front Sen house/family), while he set up his retirement quarters on adjacent property. Sōtan had his fourth and youngest son, Sensō Sōshitsu, adopted into the family of a doctor, but after a few years the doctor died and so Sōshitsu returned to live with Sōtan. Eventually, he became heir to the retirement quarters, and the family there came to be known as the Urasenke (rear Sen house/family).

Also, among Sōtan's chanoyu followers, there were four who were especially close and active in the world of chanoyu. They are referred to as Sōtan's "Four Heavenly Kings" (四天王, Shitennō). They were Fujimura Yōken (1613–99), Sugiki Fusai (1628–1706), Yamada Sōhen (1627–1708), and Kusumi Soan (1636–1728). Some listings, however, consider that rather than Kusumi Soan, the fourth was either Miyake Bōyō (1580–1649) or Matsuo Sōji (1579–1658).

== Written works ==
- Sōtan Chakai Kondate Nikki (Sōtan's Tea Ceremony Cookery Menu Diary), 1587
