= Sen no Dōan =

Japanese tea ceremony master

Sen no Dōan (千道安) (1546–1607) was a Japanese tea ceremony master. He was the eldest son, hence the blood descendant and natural heir, of Sen no Rikyū, born between Rikyū and Rikyū's first wife, known as Hōshin Myōju (died 1577). His brother-in-law was Sen Shōan, and one of the reasons for the complexity of the family lineage after Rikyū is that Shōan, rather than Dōan, became the Sen family successor.

Sen no Dōan was born in Imaichi, in the city of Sakai in present Osaka Prefecture, the original home of Sen no Rikyū and family. Shōan, who not only was his step-brother (the son of Rikyū's second wife) but was also his brother-in-law (husband of his sister, Okame) and was the same age as himself, established a house in Kyoto, and with this there arose the "Sakai Sen House" (Sakai-Senke) and the Kyoto Sen House (Kyō-Senke). Dōan inherited the Sen estate in Sakai, but he had no offspring or heir, and so the Sakai-Senke came to an end with his death.
