= Mushakōjisenke =

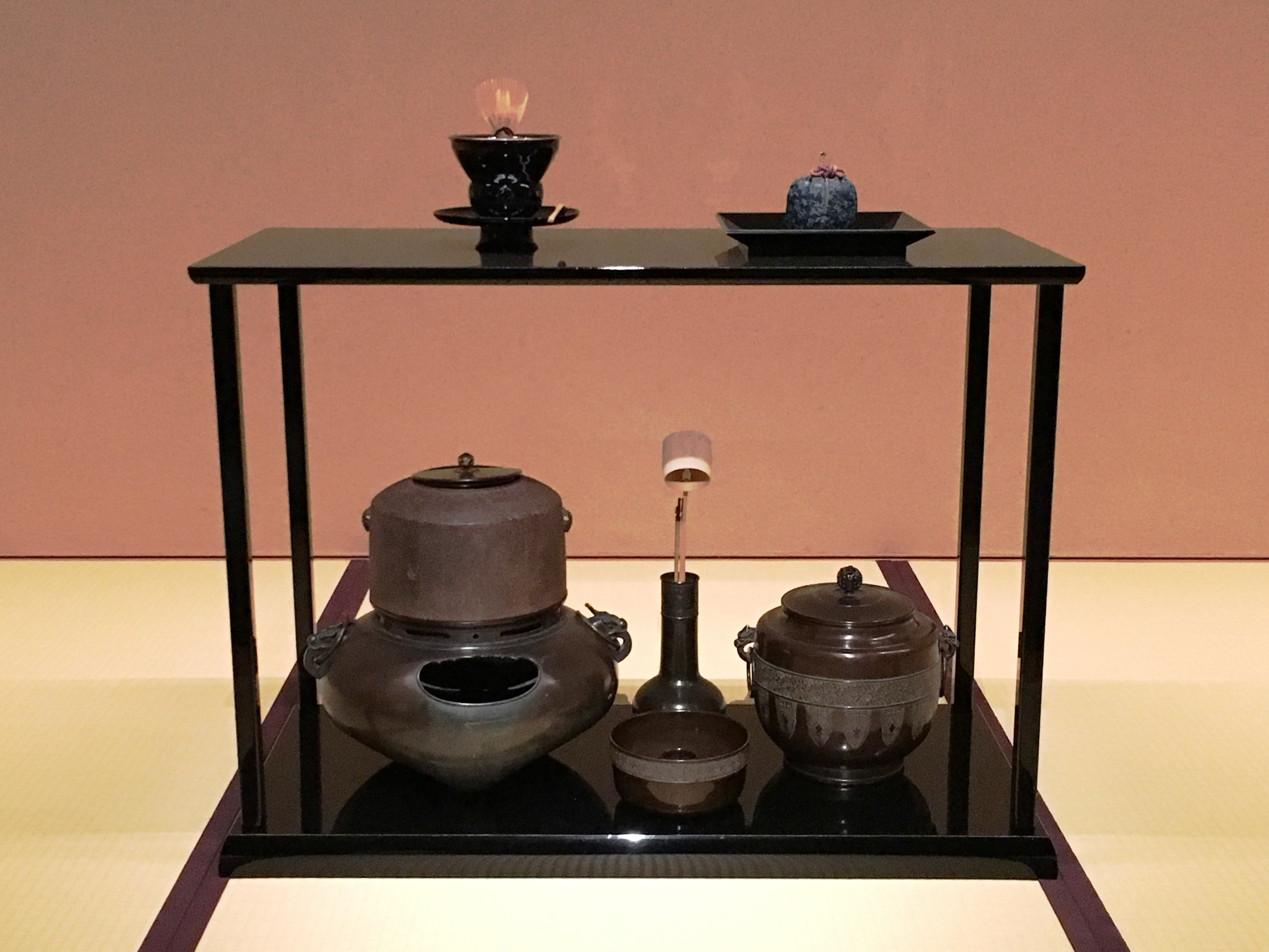
Set of tea utensils of the Mushakōjisenke

Mushakōjisenke (武者小路千家), sometimes referred to as Mushanokōjisenke, is one of the three schools of Japanese tea ceremony. Along with Urasenke and Omotesenke, the Mushakōjisenke is one of the three lines of the Sen family descending from Sen no Rikyū, which together are known as the san-Senke or "three Sen houses/families" (三千家). The head or iemoto of this line carries the hereditary name Sōshu (宗守).

== History ==
Mushakōjisenke is associated with Sen no Rikyū's great-grandson Ichiō Sōshu (一翁宗守), who was the second to the oldest of Sen no Sōtan's four sons. Like his older brother, he was Sōtan's son by Sōtan's first wife, and through much of his life he lived apart from the Sen house. During this time, he became a lacquer artisan. At the behest of his younger brothers, however, he set up his own tea house, called the Kankyū-an, on Mushakōji street, and became devoted to practicing and teaching the Way of Tea.

Ichiō Sōshu was appointed tea teacher to the Matsudaira clan in Takamatsu, Sanuki Province. Until the Meiji Restoration, the family heir through the generations was in service to the Matsudaira of Takamatsu.

The eleventh leader of the Mushakōjisenke is credited for modernizing tea ceremony in Japan.

== Generations ==
Generation	Personal name		Buddhist name	
1st	Rikyu Sōeki (1522–91)	利休宗易	Hōsensai	抛筌斎
2nd	Shōan Sōjun (1546–1614)	少庵宗淳		
3rd	Genpaku Sōtan (1578–1658)	元伯宗旦	Totsutotsusai	咄々斎
4th	Ichiō Sōshu (1605–1676)	一翁宗守	Jikyūsai	似休斎
5th	Bunshuku Sōshu (1658–1708)	文叔宗守	Kyoyūsai	許由斎
6th	Shinpaku Sōshu (1693–1745)	真伯宗守	Seiseisai	静々斎
7th	Kensō Sōshu (1725–1782)	堅叟宗守	Jikisai	直斎
8th	Kyūō Sōshu (1763–1838)	休翁宗守	Ittotsusai	一啜斎
9th	Nin'ō Sōshu (1795–1835)	仁翁宗守	Kōkōsai	好々斎
10th	Zendō Sōshu (1830–1891)	全道宗守	Ishinsai	以心斎
11th	Issō Sōshu (1848–1898)	一叟宗守	Isshisai	一指斎
12th	Chōshō Sōshu (1889–1953)	聴松宗守	Yūkōsai	愈好斎
13th	Tokuō Sōshu (1913–1999)	徳翁宗守	Urinsai	有隣斎
14th (current iemoto)	Sen Sōshu (born 1945)	宗守	Futessai	不徹斎
