= Sen no Rikyū =

Japanese tea master (1522–1591)

- 千 利休
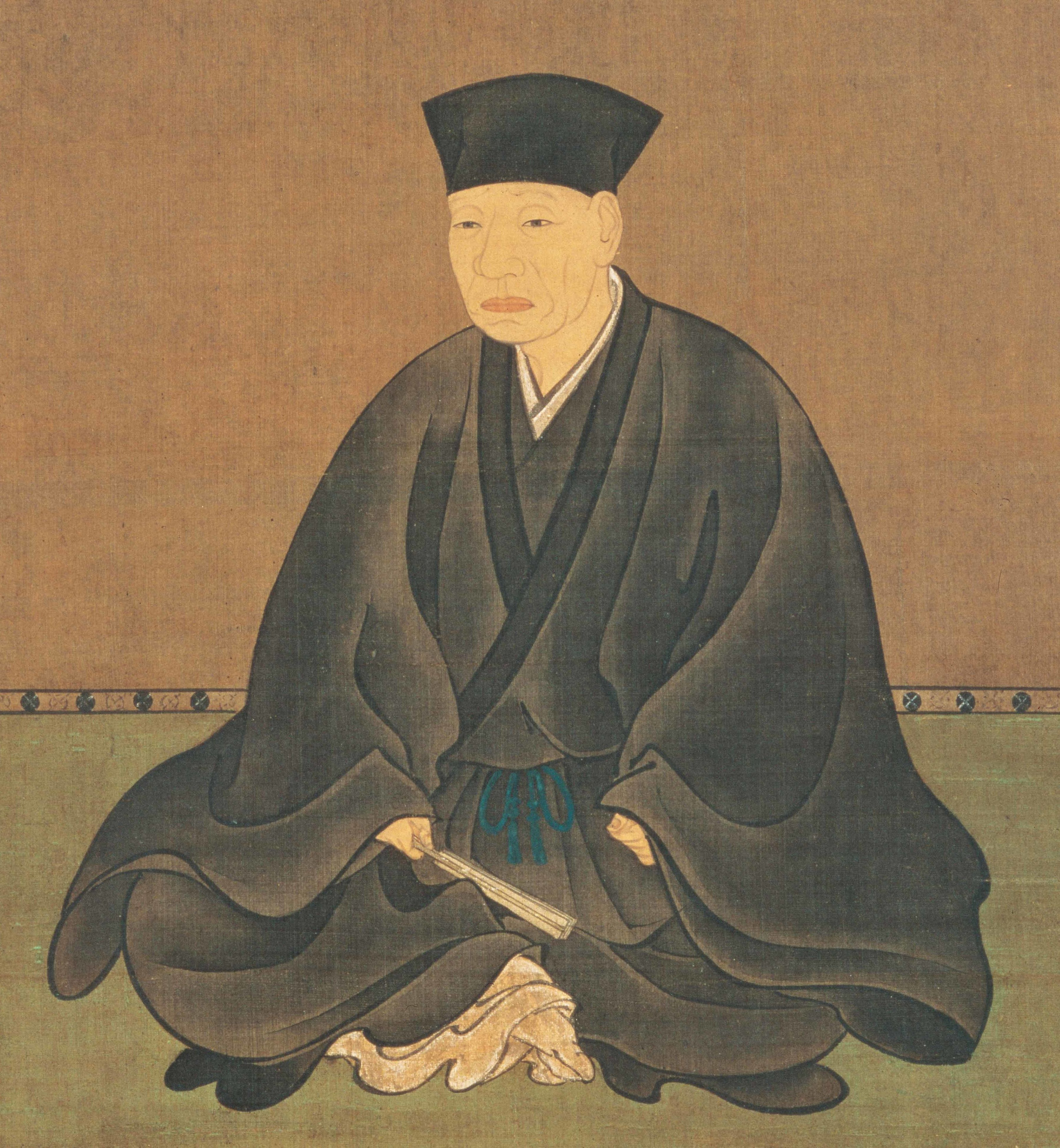
- Sen no Rikyū by Hasegawa Tōhaku

Personal life
- Born: 1522 Sakai, Sengoku Japan
- Died: April 21, 1591 (aged 68–69) Kyoto, Azuchi–Momoyama Japan
- Resting place: Jukō-in

Religious life
- Religion: Zen
- School: Rinzai school

Sen no Rikyū (Note: Japanese pronunciation: [seꜜn no | ɾʲiꜜ.kʲɯː, sen no ɾʲiꜜ.kʲɯː, seꜜn no (|) ɾʲi.kʲɯː]) (Japanese: 千 利休; 1522 – April 21, 1591), also known simply as Rikyū, (Note: Japanese pronunciation: [ɾʲiꜜ.kʲɯː, ɾʲi.kʲɯː]) was a Japanese tea master considered the most important influence on the Japanese tea ceremony, particularly the tradition of wabi-cha. He was also the first to emphasize several key aspects of the ceremony, including rustic simplicity, directness of approach and honesty of self. Originating from the Sengoku and Azuchi–Momoyama periods, these aspects of the tea ceremony persist.

Three iemoto or sōke ('head houses') of tea ceremony are directly descended from Rikyū: the Omotesenke, Urasenke, and Mushakōjisenke, all of which are dedicated to passing forward the teachings of their mutual family founder, Rikyū. They are collectively referred to as san senke.

== Early life ==
Rikyū was born in Sakai, now in Osaka Prefecture. His father was a warehouse owner named Tanaka Yohei (田中與兵衛), who later in life also used the family name Sen, and his mother was Gesshin Myōchin (月岑妙珎). His childhood name was Yoshiro (與四郎).

As a young man, Rikyū studied tea under the townsman of Sakai named Kitamuki Dōchin (1504–1562), and at nineteen, through Dōchin's introduction, he began to study tea under Takeno Jō'ō, who is also associated with the development of the wabi aesthetic in tea ceremony. He is believed to have received the Buddhist name Sōeki (宗易) from the Rinzai Zen priest Dairin Sōtō (1480–1568) of Nanshū-ji in Sakai. He married a woman known as Hōshin Myōju (d. 1577) around when he was 21. Rikyū underwent Zen training at Daitoku-ji in Kyoto. Not much is known about his middle years.

== Later years ==
In 1579, at the age of 58, Rikyū became a tea master for Oda Nobunaga and, following Nobunaga's death in 1582, he was a tea master for Toyotomi Hideyoshi. His relationship with Hideyoshi quickly deepened, and he entered Hideyoshi's circle of confidants, effectively becoming the most influential figure in the world of chanoyu. In 1585, as he needed extra credentials to enter the Imperial Palace in order to help at a tea gathering that would be given by Hideyoshi for Emperor Ōgimachi, the emperor bestowed upon him the Buddhist lay name and title "Rikyū Koji" (利休居士). Another major chanoyu event of Hideyoshi's that Rikyū played a central role in was the Grand Kitano Tea Ceremony, held by Hideyoshi at the shrine of Kitano Tenmangū in 1587.

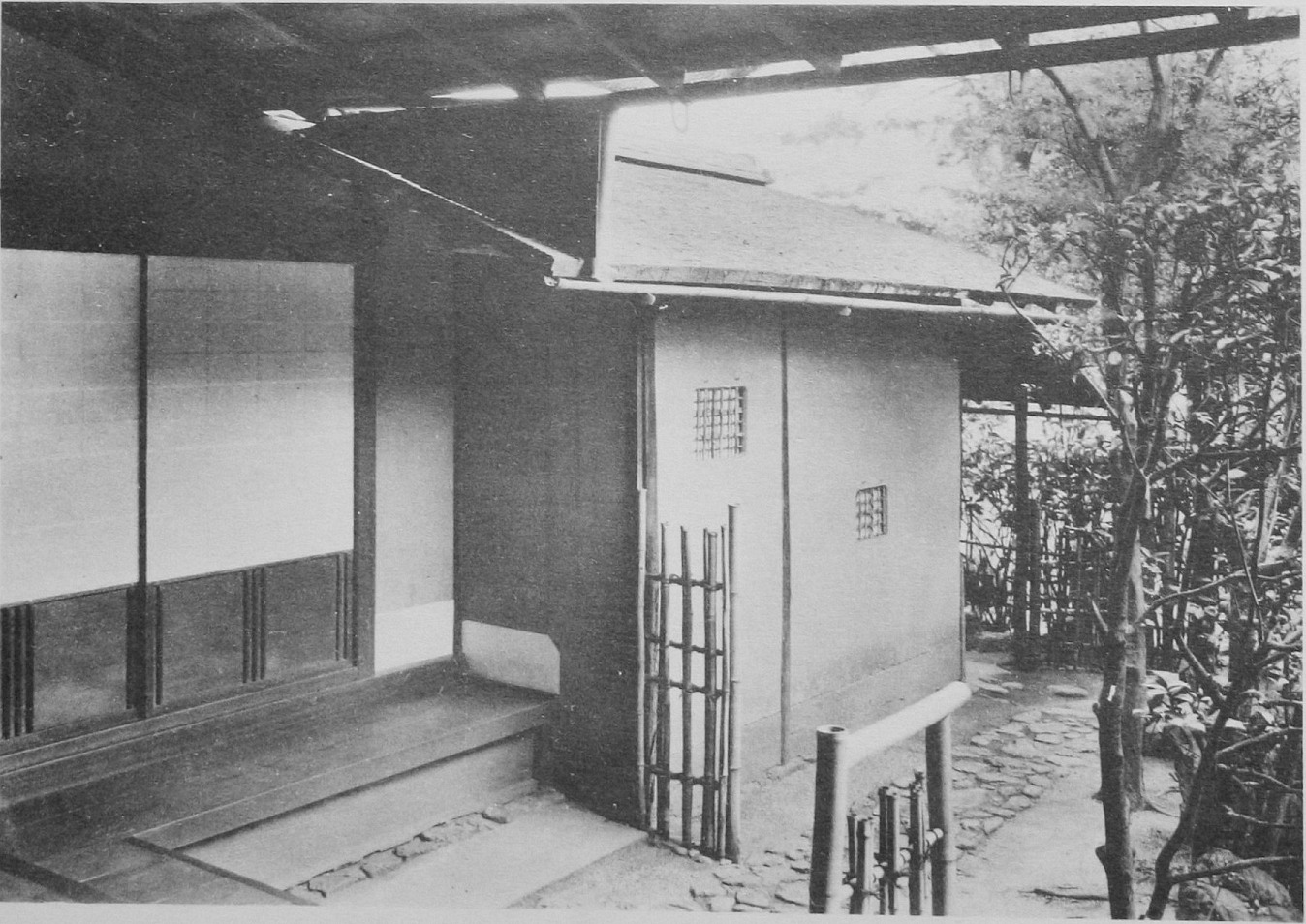
His chashitsu Tai-an at the Myōki-an, Kyoto

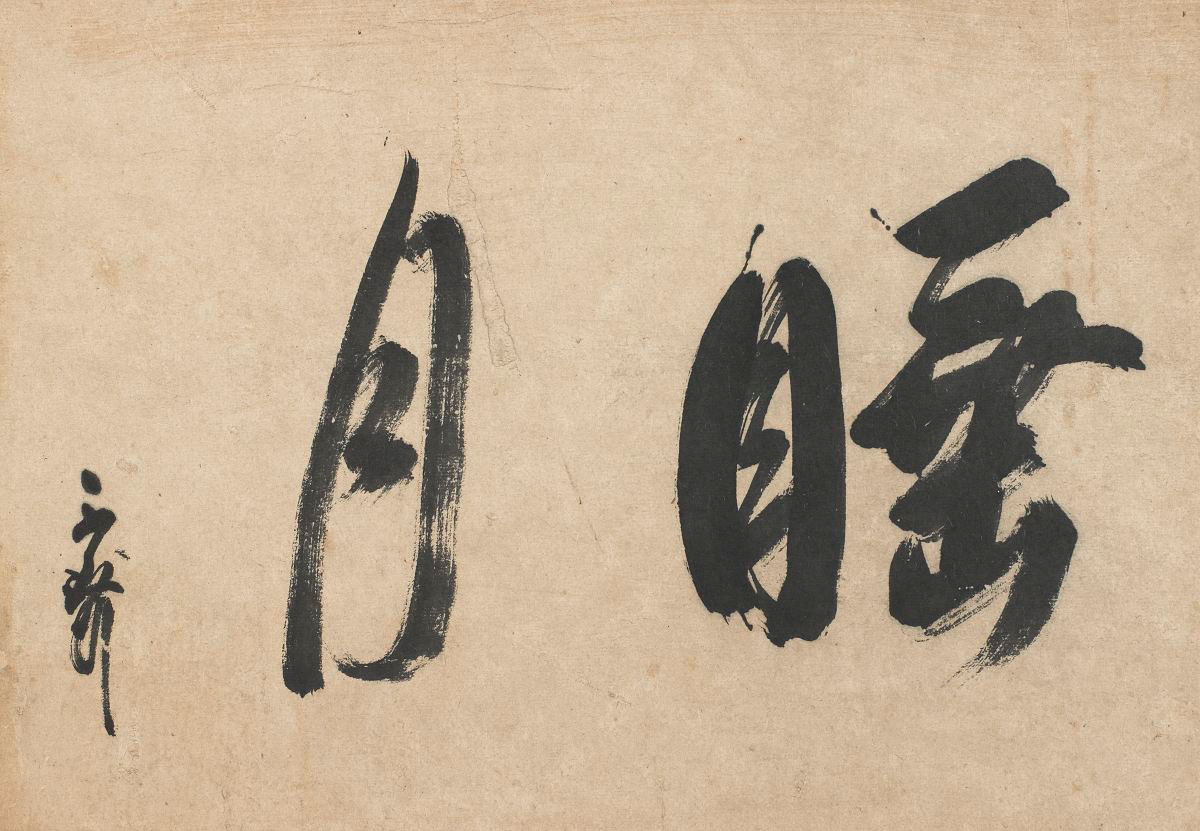
Suigetsu (Intoxicated by the Moon) paper hanging scroll for a tea ceremony by Sen no Rikyū, c. 1575

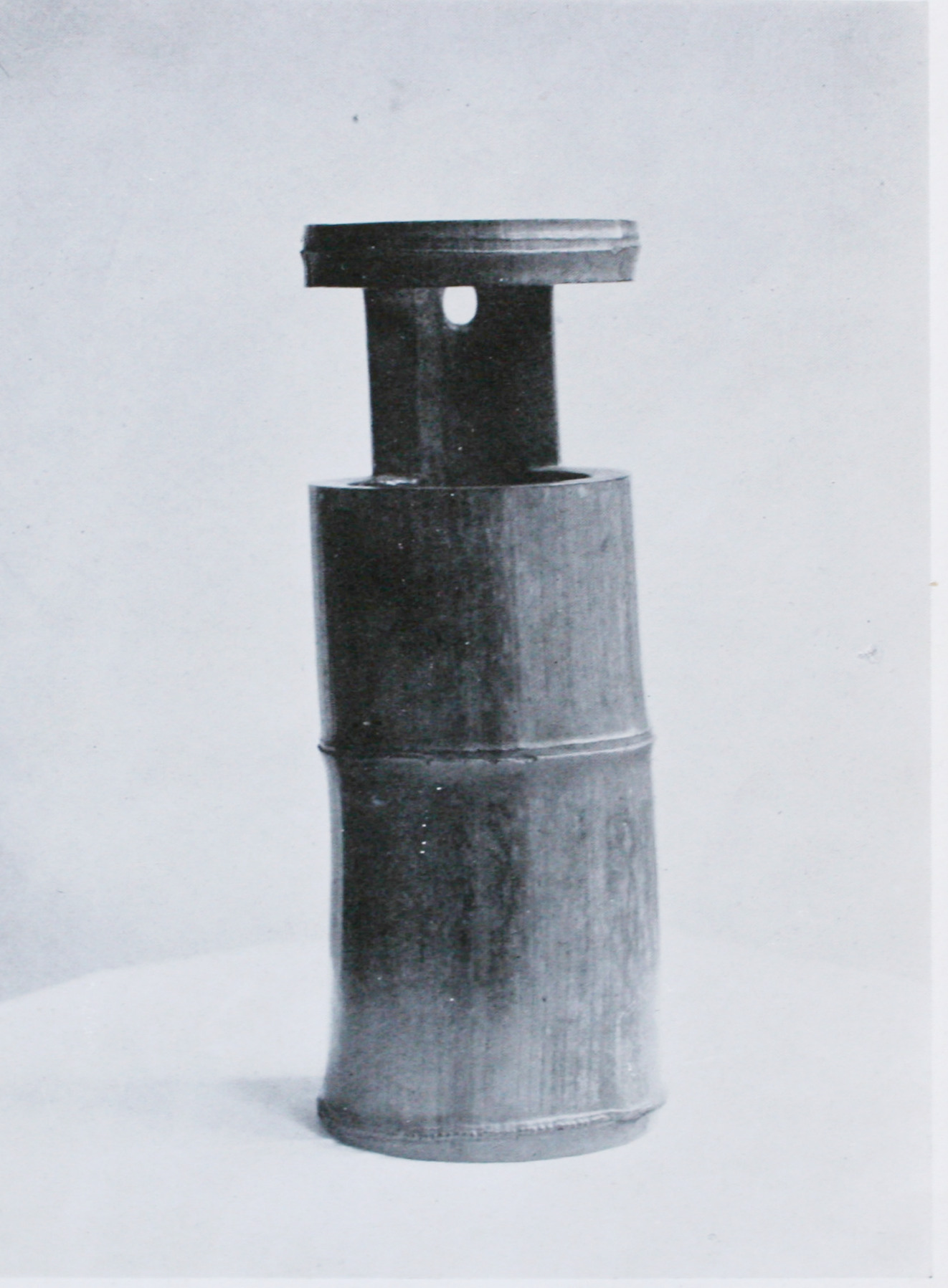
Flower vase Onkyoku, by Sen no Rikyū, 16th century

It was during his later years that Rikyū began to use very tiny, rustic chashitsu (tea ceremony rooms) referred as sō-an ('grass hermitage'), such as the two-tatami mat tea room named Tai-an, which can be seen today at Myōki-an temple in Yamazaki, a suburb of Kyoto, and which is credited to his design. This tea room has been designated as a National Treasure. He also developed many tea utensils, including bamboo flower containers, tea scoops, and lid rests, and used everyday objects in tea ceremony in novel ways.

Raku ware chawan (tea bowls) were originated through his collaboration with a tile-maker named Raku Chōjirō. Rikyū preferred simple, rustic, locally-made items to the expensive, Chinese-made items that were fashionable at the time. Though not the inventor of the philosophy of wabi-sabi, which finds beauty in the very simple, Rikyū is among those most responsible for popularizing it, developing it, and incorporating it into tea ceremony. He developed a new form of tea ceremony using simple instruments and settings. This, along with his other beliefs and teachings, came to be known as sōan-cha (the grass-thatched hermitage style of chanoyu), or, more generally, wabi-cha. This line of chanoyu that his descendants and followers carried on was recognized as the Senke-ryū (千家流; 'school of the house of Sen').

A writer and poet, the tea master referred to the ware and its relationship with the tea ceremony, saying, "Though you wipe your hands and brush off the dust and dirt from the vessels, what is the use of all this fuss if the heart is still impure?"

Two of his primary disciples were Nanbō Sōkei (南坊宗啓; dates unknown), a somewhat legendary Zen priest; and Yamanoue Sōji (1544–1590), a townsman of Sakai. Another was Furuta Oribe (1544–1615), who became a celebrated tea master after Rikyū's death. Nanbō is credited as the original author of the Southern Record, a record of Rikyū's teachings. There is, however, debate over whether Nanbō even existed, and some scholars argue that his writings were actually by the samurai litterateur Tachibana Jitsuzan (1655-1708), who claimed to have found and transcribed these texts. Yamanoue's chronicle, the Yamanoue Sōji ki (山上宗二記), gives commentary about Rikyū's teachings and the state of chanoyu at the time of its writing.

Rikyū had a number of children, including a son, Sen no Dōan, and a daughter, Okame. This daughter married Sen Shōan, the son of Rikyū's second wife in a previous marriage. Due to complex circumstances, Sen Shōan, rather than Rikyū's legitimate heir, Dōan, was recognized as the second-generation figure in the Sen family tradition of tea ceremony.

Rikyū also wrote poetry and practiced ikebana.

One of his favourite gardens was said to be at Chishaku-in in Kyoto.

== Death ==
Although Rikyū had been one of Hideyoshi's closest confidants, because of crucial differences of opinion and because he was too independent, Hideyoshi ordered him to commit ritual suicide. One year earlier, after the Siege of Odawara (1590), his famous disciple Yamanoue Sōji was tortured and decapitated on Hideyoshi's orders. While Hideyoshi's reason may never be known for certain, it is known that Rikyū committed seppuku at his residence within Hideyoshi's Jurakudai palace in Kyoto in 1591 on the 28th day of the 2nd month (of the traditional Japanese lunar calendar; or April 21 when calculated according to the modern Gregorian calendar), at the age of seventy.

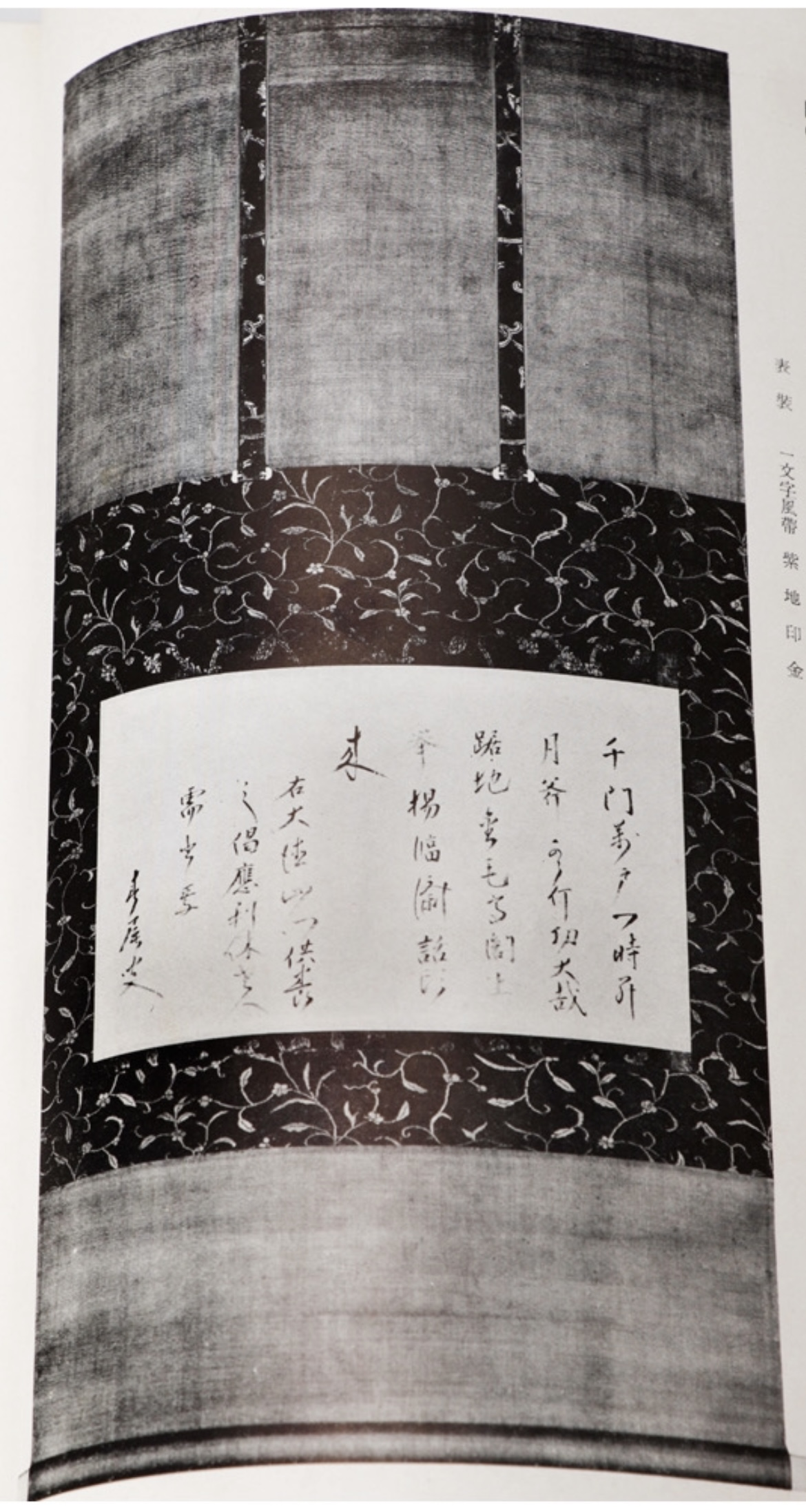
The memorial gatha of Sanmon, "Kinmo palace", in Daitoku-ji

According to Okakura Kakuzō in The Book of Tea, Rikyū's last act was to hold an exquisite tea ceremony. After serving all his guests, he presented each piece of the tea-equipage for their inspection, along with an exquisite kakemono, which Okakura described as "a wonderful writing by an ancient monk dealing with the evanescence of all things". Rikyū presented each of his guests with a piece of the equipment as a souvenir, with the exception of the bowl, which he shattered, as he uttered the words: "Never again shall this cup, polluted by the lips of misfortune, be used by man." As the guests departed, one remained to serve as witness to Rikyū's death. Rikyū's last words, which he wrote down as a death poem, were in verse, addressed to the dagger with which he took his own life:

In a life of seventy years,
after exerting myself to the limit,
now, with my own sacred sword
I kill both patriarchs and the Buddha.

Carrying in my hands
the only weapon I own—
this one long sword—
and at this moment, alas,
I abandon it to the heavens.

When Hideyoshi was building his lavish residence at Fushimi the following year, he remarked that he wished its construction and decoration to be pleasing to Rikyū. Hideyoshi was known for his temper, and is said to have expressed regret at his treatment of Rikyū.

Rikyū's grave is located at Jukō-in sub-temple in the Daitoku-ji compound in Kyoto; his posthumous Buddhist name is Fushin'an Rikyū Sōeki Koji.

Memorials for Rikyū are observed annually by many schools of Japanese tea. The Omotesenke school's annual memorial takes place at the family's headquarters each year on March 27, and the Urasenke school's takes place at its own family's headquarters each year on March 28. The three Sen families (Omotesenke, Urasenke, Mushakōjisenke) take turns holding a memorial service on the 28th of every month, at their mutual family temple, the subsidiary temple Jukōin at Daitoku-ji temple.

== Rikyū's Seven High-Status Disciples ==
The Rikyū Shichitetsu (利休七哲) ('Seven Foremost Disciples', 'Seven Luminaries') is a set of seven high-ranking daimyō or generals who were also direct disciples of Sen no Rikyū: Maeda Toshinaga, Gamō Ujisato, Hosokawa Tadaoki, Furuta Oribe, Makimura Toshisada, Dom Justo Takayama, and Shibayama Munetsuna. The seven-member set was first mentioned by Rikyū's grandson Sen no Sōtan. In a 1663 list given by Sōtan's son (and fourth-generation head of the Sen Sōsa lineage of tea masters), Maeda Toshinaga is replaced by Seta Masatada.

== See also ==
- Sen Shōan
- Sen no Sōtan
