= Sen Shōan =

Sen Shōan (千少庵) (1546 – October 10, 1614) was a Japanese tea ceremony master, and is distinguished in Japanese cultural history as the second generation in the Sen family tradition of Japanese tea ceremony founded by his father-in-law, Sen no Rikyū.

== Early life ==
Shōan’s father was Miyaō Saburō, who was a resident of Sakai and was a master at playing the Japanese hand drum (tsuzumi). Circumstantial evidence indicates that Miyaō Saburō probably died around the year 1553. Shōan's mother, the wife of Miyaō Saburō, was known as Sōon. She became the second wife of Sen no Rikyū. Shōan was adopted into the Sen family and became the son-in-law of Rikyū when he married Rikyū's daughter Okame. The oldest boy born between Shōan and Okame was Sen Sōtan, the third generation in the Sen family tradition of Japanese tea ceremony.

== Tea ceremony career ==
Shōan was the same age as Rikyū's oldest son, Sen Dōan, but his skill at Japanese tea ceremony was much more highly reputed than was Dōan's. Rikyū left the Sen estate in Sakai for Dōan, and had Shōan and family set up a new Sen household in Kyoto. The exact year of the move is unknown, but it represented the origin of the so-called Kyoto Sen Family (Kyō-Senke), which evolved into the present san-Senke (lit., three Sen houses/families) (see Schools of Japanese tea ceremony).

Following Rikyū's seppuku (ritual suicide) by order of Toyotomi Hideyoshi, the Kyoto property where Shōan and family resided was confiscated. Shōan went to Aizu-Wakamatsu (present-day Fukushima Prefecture) where he lived under the protection of the warrior Gamō Ujisato. At Aizu-Wakamatsu, the Rinkaku (麟閣) teahouse was built for Shōan. Some years later, Hideyoshi pardoned the Sen family and arranged for the restoration of the Kyoto household.

Sen Dōan in Sakai, similarly, was pardoned and allowed to reestablish the Sen household in Sakai, but that household eventually died out, as Dōan had no successor.

When the Kyoto Sen household was reestablished, it was decided between Hideyoshi and Shōan that Sōtan, Rikyū's blood descendant who had been living as a young Buddhist trainee at Daitoku-ji temple during this period of family upheaval, should become acting head of the family. It is believed that Shōan therefore retired early and moved to a small cottage called Shōnantei at Saihōji temple (see Kokedera), in western Kyoto.
