= Iemoto =

Japanese term

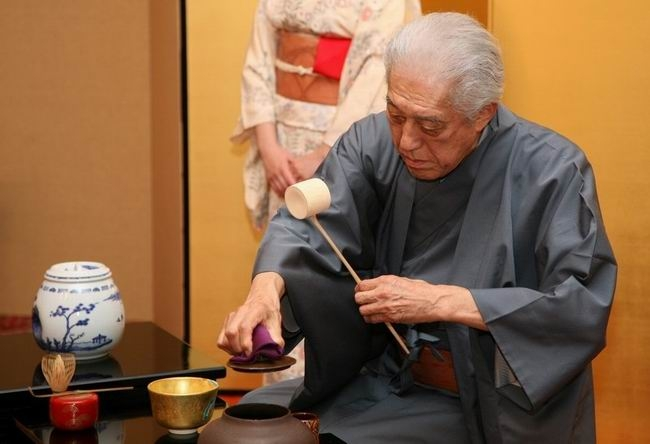
Genshitsu Sen, 15th iemoto of the Urasenke school

Iemoto (家元, lit. 'family foundation') is a Japanese term used to refer to the founder or current Grand Master of a certain school of traditional Japanese art. It is used synonymously with the term sōke (宗家) when it refers to the family or house that the iemoto is head of and represents.

The word iemoto is also used to describe a system of familial generations in traditional Japanese arts such as tea ceremony (including sencha), ikebana, Noh, calligraphy, traditional Japanese dance, traditional Japanese music, the Japanese art of incense appreciation (kōdō), and Japanese martial arts. Shogi and Go once used the iemoto system as well. The iemoto system is characterized by a hierarchical structure and the supreme authority of the iemoto, who has inherited the secret traditions of the school from the previous iemoto.

== Titles ==
An iemoto may be addressed by the title Iemoto or O-Iemoto, or by the title Sōshō (宗匠) or Ō-sensei (大先生). In English, iemoto is often translated as "Grand Master". The iemoto's main roles are to lead the school and protect its traditions, to be the final authority on matters concerning the school, to issue or approve licenses and certificates and, in some cases, to instruct the most advanced practitioners.

The title of iemoto in most cases is hereditary. It is commonly transmitted by direct line, or by adoption. Once the "successor-to-be" is officially recognized, that successor-to-be may appropriate the title of Wakasōshō (若宗匠, "Young Master"). By tradition, the title of iemoto is also passed down along with a hereditary name. In the Urasenke tradition of tea ceremony, for example, the iemoto carries the name "Sōshitsu". There can only be one iemoto at the head of one school at a time, which sometimes leads to the creation of new "houses" or "lines" by those wishing to be iemoto themselves.

== Structure ==
Officially recognized teachers of the traditional arts that hold the position of iemoto obtain a license to teach from the former iemoto, signifying the iemoto's trust that the so-licensed person is capable and qualified to faithfully pass on the school's teachings. Students must also acquire licenses or certificates at various stages in their study. Depending on the school, such certificates either give the student permission to study at a particular level or affirm that the student has achieved a given level of mastery. Recipients must pay for these certificates which, at the highest level, may cost several million yen. It is also the iemoto who authorises, selects and bestows ceremonial names for advanced practitioners.

== History ==
As far back as the Heian period (794–1185), there were iemoto-like family lines that were responsible for passing down the secret traditions and orthodox teachings of their particular school of art, but the first appearance of the word iemoto in extant records dates to the end of the 17th century, where it is used in reference to families entitled to have their sons become priests at great temples. Its use in the sense that it is used today, in the realm of traditional Japanese arts, starts to appear in documents in the middle of the 18th century.

The system of iemoto is a manifestation of the ie (家) or "household" and dōzoku (同族) or "extended kin" pattern of relationships in Japanese society. The concept of the "iemoto system" (家元制度) was developed further by the historian Matsunosuke Nishiyama in the post-war period to describe the social structures associated with exclusive family control and networks of instructors, a characteristic of the feudal era whose influence on traditional arts is still felt today.

== Famous families and schools ==
=== Go ===
There were originally four main schools of Go players: Hon'inbō, Hayashi, Inoue and Yasui, alongside three minor schools: Sakaguchi, Hattori and Mizutani.

Early in the 17th century, the then best player in Japan, Hon'inbō Sansa, was made head of a newly founded Go academy (the Hon'inbō school (本因坊), which developed the level of playing greatly, and introduced the martial arts style system of ranking players. The government discontinued its support for the Go academies in 1868 as a result of the fall of the Tokugawa shogunate.

In honour of the Hon'inbō school, whose players consistently dominated the other schools during their history, one of the most prestigious Japanese Go championships is called the "Honinbo" tournament.

=== Ikebana ===
The three main schools of Japanese flower arrangement, or ikebana, are Ikenobō, Ohara, and Sōgetsu.

According to the organization Ikebana Network, there currently are 138 registered schools of small and large size (as of August 2008).

=== Traditional Japanese dance ===
There are about 200 schools of traditional Japanese dance. The five most famous are the Hanayagi-ryū, Fujima-ryū, Wakayagi-ryū, Nishikawa-ryū, and Bandō-ryū.

=== Incense appreciation ===
The two main schools of Incense appreciation (香道, kōdō) are the Shino-ryū and the Nijō-ryū.

== Criticism and opposition ==
The iemoto system has been described as rigid, expensive, nepotistic, authoritarian and undemocratic. Some groups have chosen to reject the iemoto system. In the realm of the Japanese tea ceremony, Sensho Tanaka created the Dai Nihon Chadō Gakkai (大日本茶道学会) in 1898 to systematize teaching chadō in a more democratic way outside the rigidity of the iemoto system. Hiroaki Kikuoka, a shamisen player, created a presidential system for his group. Koto player Michiyo Yagi has rejected both the iemoto system and the traditional style of her instrument, choosing to strike chords.

== See also ==
- Dōshu
