= Raku =

Raku may refer to:

- Lake Raku, an artificial lake in Tallinn, Estonia
- Raku ware, a type of pottery used in the Japanese tea ceremony
- Raku, Nepal, a village in the Karnali Zone
- RAkU (ballet), a ballet by Yuri Possokhov
- Raku (programming language), a computer language formerly known as Perl 6
- Raku (wrestler) (born 1997), Japanese professional wrestler

== See also ==
- Horse hair raku, a method of decorating pottery
- Raku-Go, a form of Japanese verbal entertainment
