= Rikyū =

Rikyū may refer to:

- Sen no Rikyū, the 16th century Japanese master of the tea ceremony
- Rikyu (film), the 1989 Hiroshi Teshigahara film about the later years of Sen no Rikyū's life
- Rikyū, a 16th-century black Raku tea bowl by Chōjirō
- Rikyū crater, on Mercury
