= Michele Niccolai =

Italian sculptor

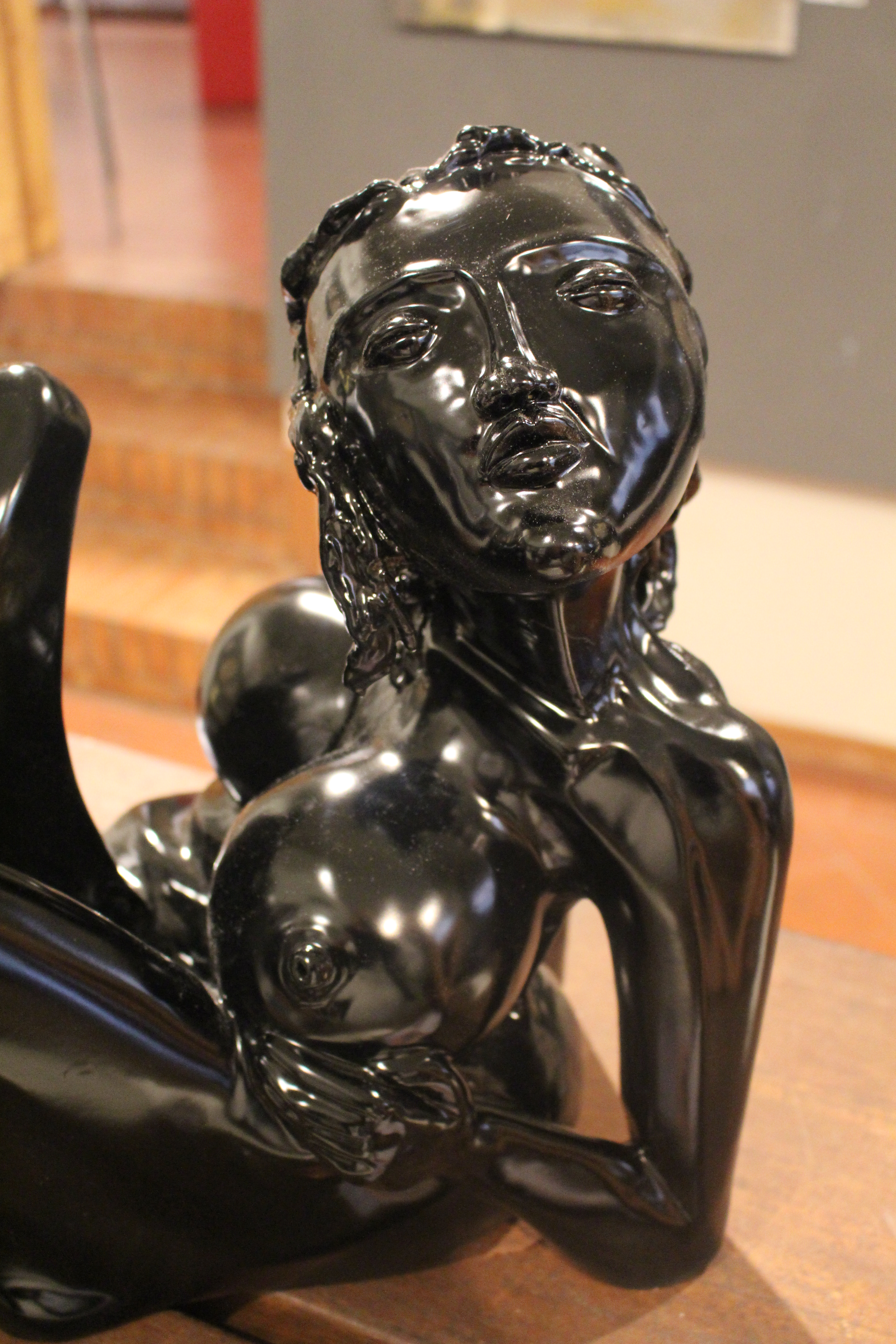
- Born: 29 December 1953 (age 72); Livorno, Tuscany
- Known for: Sculpture
- Movement: Post modern

Michele Niccolai is a sculptor born in Livorno. He spent his youth in Cecina. He learned to sculpt and fire clay using his garndfather's furnace.

== Career ==
During his time at the university, he worked with the master sculptor Alberto Mainardi. After graduating in architecture, he learned from the ceramist Gabriella Zazzeri the Japanese Raku ware technique.

For over 35 years, he has been teaching at the Leon Battisti Alberti high school in Florence.

Examples of his art are Processo a Pigmalione (2005) in the Museo degli Innocenti Firenze, (2009) I Baccanali in the Auditorium of the Duomo of Firenze. In 2013 he was the subject of a solo exhibition celebrating his fifty-year career as a sculptor at the palazzo Panciatichi seat of Consiglio regionale della Toscana.

Critics Maria Giovanna Carli and Maria Carla Caccialupi have written about his sculptural art.

== Sculpturing ==
- Exhibition 1973 – 2003 Andata e ritorno, Cecina, 2003.
- Exhibition Processo a Pigmalione Museo degli Innocenti Firenze, 2005.
- Group Exhibition Floating Art in Lungarno Ferrucci Firenze, 2005
- Group Exhibition Il Cavallo di De Chirico Collettiva Palazzo del Pegaso, 2006
- Exhibition I Baccanali Auditorium del Duomo di Firenze, 2009.
- Solo Exhibition at Consiglio Regionale della Toscana Palazzo del Pegaso Firenze, 2013.
- Exhibition L'armonia del bello" in Chiostro di San Marco in Firenze in 2016.
- Exhibition Painting and sculpture with Roberto Greco in Colle Val d'Elsa in 2017.

== Works in public spaces and other projects ==
- 2013 – The Sculpture La speranza d'oro Gallery of the Regional Council of Tuscany

== Awards and honors ==
The Sculpture La speranza d'oro is the logo of The Premio Impresa Innovazione Lavoro del Consiglio Regionale della Toscana.

== Biography reading ==
- Carli, Giovanna M. (2006). Il cavallo di de Chirico. Assoli d'autore in Toscana (in Italian). Il Masso delle Fate. ISBN 88-60390206.
