= Rikyu tea bowl =

16th-century black Raku tea bowl by Chōjirō

Rikyū
- 黒楽茶碗 銘 利休 (Japanese)
- Artist: Chōjirō
- Year: 16th century
- Type: Black Raku ware tea bowl
- Dimensions: 7.3 cm high; 9.8 cm mouth diameter; 4.9 cm foot-ring diameter

Rikyū (黒楽茶碗 銘 利休, "Black Raku tea bowl, named Rikyū") is a 16th-century black Raku tea bowl (chawan) by Chōjirō. The bowl was published as plate 18 in the February 1957 issue of the Japan Ceramic Society's journal Tōsetsu, was exhibited as no. 138 in the Tokyo National Museum special exhibition Chanoyu: The Arts of Tea Ceremony, The Essence of Japan in 2017, and as no. 148 in the Kyoto National Museum special exhibition Chanoyu: Tea in the Cultural Life of Kyoto in 2022.

== Description ==
The 2022 Kyoto National Museum catalogue records the bowl as 7.3 cm high, with a mouth diameter of 9.8 cm and a foot-ring diameter of 4.9 cm. Its commentary describes it as a relatively small Chōjirō bowl with a refined and well-composed form. Compared with early Chōjirō bowls such as Mukiguri and Tarōbō, the movements of its hand-forming and spatula work are described as quieter and more restrained.

The bowl is comparatively thinly made. Its rim turns slightly inward, and the interior contains a shallow chadamari, or tea-pool depression, extending toward one side. On the exterior, the body has been carved to create a very slight change of plane around its middle, while the foot ring is comparatively small. The 2022 catalogue describes the glaze as smooth and well fused.

== Name and box inscription ==
According to the 2022 catalogue, the word 「利休」 ("Rikyū") is written in ink on the front of the bowl's storage-box lid, although the identity of the writer is not certain. A later accompanying inscription attributes the writing to Sen Sōtan (1578–1658), the grandson of Sen no Rikyū. The catalogue notes, however, that on the basis of the brushwork it has also been said to be by Kōshin Sōsa (1613–1672), the fourth head of the Omotesenke tradition.

The same catalogue states that tea bowls of this type were probably recognized by tea practitioners as Rikyū-gonomi (利休好み), meaning utensils or forms understood as corresponding to Rikyū's taste. The catalogue's discussion therefore distinguishes the bowl's association with the aesthetic tradition of Rikyū from the uncertain authorship of the later box inscription.

== Publication in Tōsetsu ==
The February 1957 issue of Tōsetsu, no. 47, was devoted extensively to Chōjirō and included numerous red and black Raku tea bowls. Rikyū appeared as plate 18 under the Japanese heading 「18 利休 黒茶碗」 ("18. Rikyū, black tea bowl").

The issue's plate material also associates the bowl with transmission through the Asano family. Its parallel English contents describes plate 18 as "Black, ex-collection of Asano Family". This documents an Asano-family provenance tradition by 1957, but does not by itself establish a complete earlier or later chain of ownership.

The individual discussion of the bowl appeared in the section 「長次郎作品解説」 ("Commentary on Chōjirō's works"). The 1957 treatment predates the more cautious discussion of the box inscription in the 2022 Kyoto National Museum catalogue.

== 2017 Tokyo National Museum exhibition ==
In 2017, Rikyū was exhibited as no. 138 in the Tokyo National Museum special exhibition Chanoyu: The Arts of Tea Ceremony, The Essence of Japan, held from 11 April to 4 June 2017. The catalogue identifies the work as a black Raku tea bowl named Rikyū, by Chōjirō, dating to the Azuchi–Momoyama period in the 16th century.

The bowl was reproduced as catalogue no. 138 on p. 173, with its catalogue commentary on p. 345.

== 2022 Kyoto National Museum exhibition ==
The bowl was exhibited again in 2022 as no. 148 in the Kyoto National Museum special exhibition Chanoyu: Tea in the Cultural Life of Kyoto, held from 8 October to 4 December 2022. The catalogue identifies it as:

「黒楽茶碗 銘 利休 長次郎作」

or "Black Raku tea bowl, named Rikyū, made by Chōjirō".

The catalogue dates the bowl to the Momoyama period in the 16th century and records it as one bowl, 7.3 cm high, with a mouth diameter of 9.8 cm and a foot-ring diameter of 4.9 cm. It reproduces the bowl as no. 148 on p. 179 and gives the object commentary on p. 347. The commentary is signed 「降矢」, referring to Kyoto National Museum ceramics specialist Tetsuo Furuya (降矢哲男).

== Association with Sen no Rikyū ==
The bowl's name, its box inscription, and the 2022 catalogue's use of the concept Rikyū-gonomi connect it with the tea-cultural tradition surrounding Sen no Rikyū. The surviving evidence cited for this particular bowl, however, concerns the bowl's form and later box inscription. The modern catalogue does not identify the individual surviving bowl as a documented personal possession of Sen no Rikyū.

This distinction is consistent with the broader documentary situation concerning Rikyū and Chōjirō. Contemporary tea records contain the expression 「宗易形ノ茶ワン」 ("Sōeki-form tea bowl"), using another name of Rikyū, for a type of tea bowl recorded during Rikyū's lifetime. Such evidence concerns a form associated with Rikyū and does not, by itself, identify the surviving bowl named Rikyū with a specific bowl used by him.

== See also ==
- Chōjirō
- Raku ware
- Sen no Rikyū
- Sen Sōtan
- Omotesenke
- Chawan
- Japanese tea ceremony
