= Alicja Buławka-Fankidejska =

Polish artist (born 1983)

- Born: 17 February 1983 (age 43); Starogard Gdański, Poland
- Education: Academy of Fine Arts in Gdańsk
- Style: ceramist, experimental firing, Naked raku
- Awards: 2013 – Distinction at Cluj International Ceramics Biennale; 2015 – Award of Excellence at Cluj International Ceramics Biennale

Alicja Buławka-Fankidejska (born 17 February 1983) is a Polish artist, ceramist and sculptor.

== Biography ==
Alicja Buławka-Fankidejska graduated from the State Secondary School of Fine Arts in Gdynia-Orłowo in 2003. Later she studied at the Faculty of Sculpture, Academy of Fine Arts in Gdańsk (2005–2010). Since 2013 Alicja Buławka-Fankidejska works as an assistant in the Studio of Artistic Ceramics at the Department of Sculpture and Intermedia at the Academy of Fine Arts in Gdańsk.

== Work ==
She works mainly in artistic ceramics, exploring alternative methods of firing. She is fascinated by the experimental approach to creative activities related to ceramics and influencing different senses through her art. Together with the Academy of Fine Arts in Gdansk, she organises and leads the plein-air "Ceramics Alternatively".

From 2014 to 2018 Buławka-Fankidejska, and her husband Dmitrij Buławka-Fankidejski, created ceramic and aluminium objects on the elevations of the buildings in Ogarna Street, Szeroka Street, Rybackie Pobrzeże Street and Świętojańska Street in Gdańsk. That was part of a larger project called "Gdańskie Fasady OdNowa" coordinated by City Council of Gdansk and "Urban Forms" Foundation (Łódź), which focused on the restoration of building elevations in the Main City area in Gdańsk. In 2020, Buławka-Fankidejska was curator of the exhibition "Hanna Żuławska (1908-1988). Malarstwo. Ceramika." in Bydgoszcz Art Centre.

== Selected works of art ==
- 2015 – "Into the Wild"
- 2018 – "Naked"
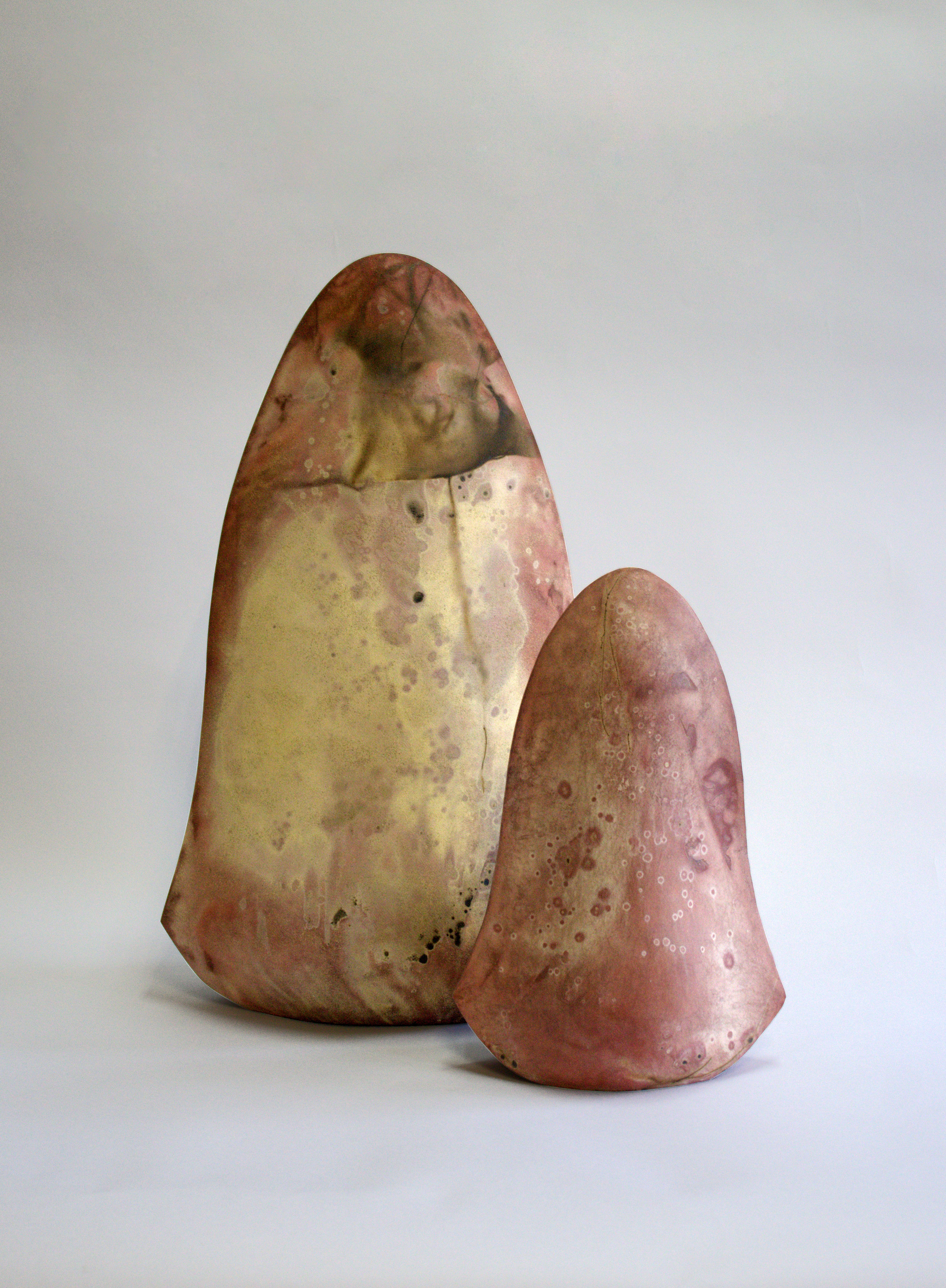
"Into the wild", 2015, artist Alicja Buławka - Fankidejska, stoneware, saggar

== Important exhibitions ==
- Cluj International Ceramics Biennale (2013, 2015)
- Best of 2015 at Cluj International Ceramics Biennale
- Gdansk Art Biennale (2016, 2020)
- „Ceramique 45” Chateau de Saint Jean le Blanc France (2019)
- Concurs de Ceramica de l’ Alcora in Spain(2019)
- III Latvia Ceramics Biennale. Martinsons Award (2021)

== Prizes ==
- 2013 – Distinction at Cluj International Ceramics Biennale
- 2015 – Award of Excellence at Cluj International Ceramics Biennale
- 2015 – Awards of the Rector of the Academy of Fine Arts in Gdańsk
