= Varma (crater) =

Crater on Mercury

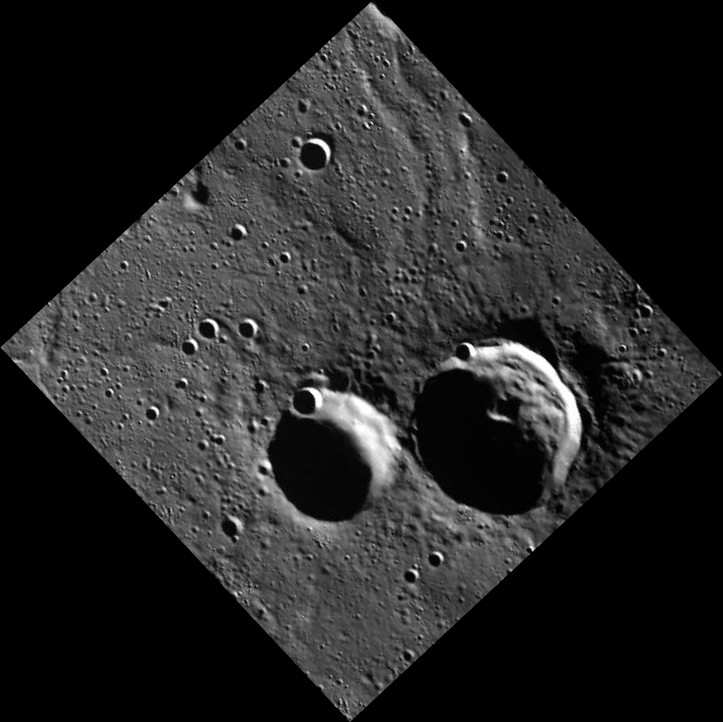
- MESSENGER WAC image of Rikyū (left) and Varma (right) craters
- Planet: Mercury
- Coordinates: 80.04°N 18.97°W
- Quadrangle: Borealis
- Diameter: 30 km (19 mi)
- Eponym: Raja Ravi Varma

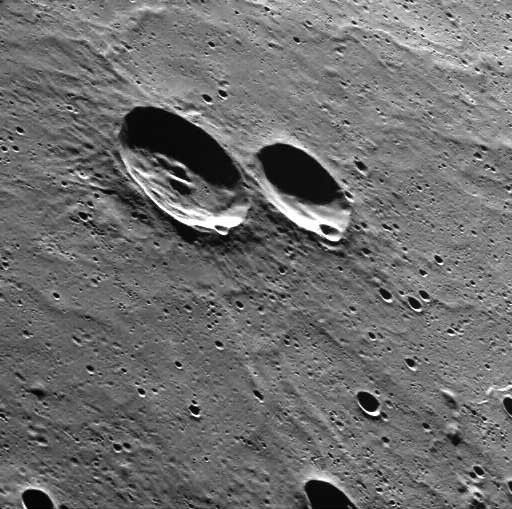
Oblique view of Rikyū (right) and Varma (left) craters

Varma is a crater on Mercury. Its name was adopted by the International Astronomical Union (IAU) on June 18, 2013. Varma is named for the Indian painter Raja Ravi Varma.

Varma is east of the slightly smaller crater Rikyū.
