= Claude Champy =

French ceramist (born 1944)

Claude Champy (born September 12, 1944 at Plaisir/Yvelines) is a French ceramist.

1963/64 Claude Champy was taught in drawing at the Atelier Met de Penninghen et Jacques d’Andon, a private art school in Paris. 1964–1968 he studied ceramics with Pierre Fouquet at the École des Arts Appliqués et des Métiers d’Art in Paris. 1965 he stayed at La Borne where he met the leading ceramists at this time and in 1967 he built his first wood-fired kiln on his parents’ estate in Plaisir. For two years, in 1971/72 he worked at a faïence factory in Clichy and finally set up his own workshop in Plaisir in 1973, where built a second wood-fired kiln, which was renewed in 1985.

Claude Champy's work consists of stoneware and porcelain vessels and objects fired in wood-fired kilns; at first exactly thrown vases and bowls with glazes applied in layers, often with a light coat on a darker ground. Later on he increasingly modelled and altered his vessels, which now tend to be larger and became vessel objects with double walls and perforation. He also makes wall plaques or large jar objects with minimal interior and heavy, fitted lids and furrowed, carinated powerfully worked surfaces, here, too, often coated in light crimson or salmon-coloured glazes as well as celadon glazes on a dark, glazed ground, trickled, dripped and thrown with brushes and ladles.

Since 1980 Claude Champy is a member of IAC Geneva. In 1988, he received the Grand Prix of the Suntory Museum of Art. At that time he formed links with Japanese ceramists and also created Raku ware.

His works are part of the Charles-Adrien Buéno's collection.

== See also ==
- Paul Soldner, an American Raku ware ceramic artist
