= Paul Soldner =

American artist

- Born: Paul Edmund Soldner; April 24, 1921; Summerfield, Illinois, US
- Died: January 3, 2011 (aged 89); Claremont, California, US
- Education: Bluffton College; University of Colorado Boulder; Otis College of Art and Design
- Known for: ceramics

Paul Edmund Soldner (April 24, 1921 – January 3, 2011) was an American ceramic artist and educator, noted for his experimentation with the 16th-century Japanese technique called raku, introducing new methods of firing and post firing, which became known as American Raku. He was the founder of the Anderson Ranch Arts Center in 1966.

== Biography ==
Paul Edmund Soldner was born on April 24, 1921, in Summerfield, Illinois, his father was a Mennonite preacher. He served as a United States Army medic during World War II. Soldner served in General George Patton's Third Army during the Battle of the Bulge, and was awarded a Purple Heart.

Soldner began to pursue a career in art upon returning to the United States after the Army, in 1946 he earned a degree from Bluffton College. He continued his studies and received a MFA degree in 1954 from the University of Colorado Boulder. Soldner then turned his attention to studying ceramics and initially focused first on functional pottery. In 1954, Soldner became Peter Voulkos' first student in the nascent ceramics department at the Los Angeles County Art Institute (now the Otis College of Art and Design). As Soldner helped his teacher establish the program, he made several changes to the studio pottery equipment, which led to him founding Soldner Pottery Equipment Corporation in 1955, to market his inventions. He eventually held seven patents related to pottery equipment.

After receiving his MFA degree in Ceramics in 1956, Soldner began teaching at Scripps College. In the 1966, he founded Anderson Ranch Arts Center in Snowmass Village, Colorado. He was also involved in starting the National Council on Education for the Ceramic Arts.

He developed a type of low-temperature salt firing. Along with Voulkos, Soldner has been credited with creating the "California School" of ceramic arts by combining Western materials and technology with Japanese techniques and aesthetics.

Soldner retired from Scripps in 1991. He lived and maintained studios in Aspen, Colorado, and Claremont, California. He died January 3, 2011, in Claremont, California.

== Awards ==
- 1992 Honorary Doctor of Fine Arts from Westminster College, New Wilmington, Pennsylvania.
- 2003 Honorary Doctorates of Fine Arts from Bluffton College, Ohio
- 2008 Awarded the Aileen Osborn Webb Gold Medal by the American Craft Council, New York City, New York.

== Bibliography ==
- Nothing to Hide Exposures, Disclosures and Reflections Clay Times Inc., (2008) ISBN 9780981629612
- Kiln Construction American Craftsmen's Council (1965)
- Makers, A History of American Studio Craft by Koplos, Janet & Metcalf, Bruce; University of North Carolina Press, July 2010, ISBN 978-0-8078-3413-8, 544 pages, 409 color and 50 b&w photos, notes, index

== Film and video ==
Year	Title	Type	Notes
2005	Paul Soldner: Playing with Fire	documentary	Film was directed by Renée Bergan.
2000	Paul Soldner, The Courage to Explore	documentary	
1992	Paul Soldner: Thrown and Altered Clay	documentary, school video	
1989	Paul Soldner Thoughts on Creativity	documentary	Made by American Ceramic Society, Southern California Section Design Chapter,

== Collections and exhibitions ==
Soldner's work is included in the collections of the Victoria and Albert Museum in London, the Los Angeles County Museum of Art (LACMA), and the Museum of Arts and Design in New York City.

Work can also be found in the following galleries:

- American Museum of Ceramic Art, Pomona, California. Paul Soldner's exhibition "Inferno" was featured for the opening of the museum in September 11, 2004
- National Gallery of Australia, Sydney, Australia
- National Museum of Modern Art, Kyoto, Japan
- Oakland Museum of California, Oakland, California
- Scripps College, Claremont, California.
- Smithsonian Institution's National Museum of American Art, Washington, D.C..
- Taipei Fine Arts Museum, Taipei, Taiwan

== See also ==
- Claude Champy, French ceramist who worked with Raku-ware
