= Rikyū (crater) =

Crater on Mercury

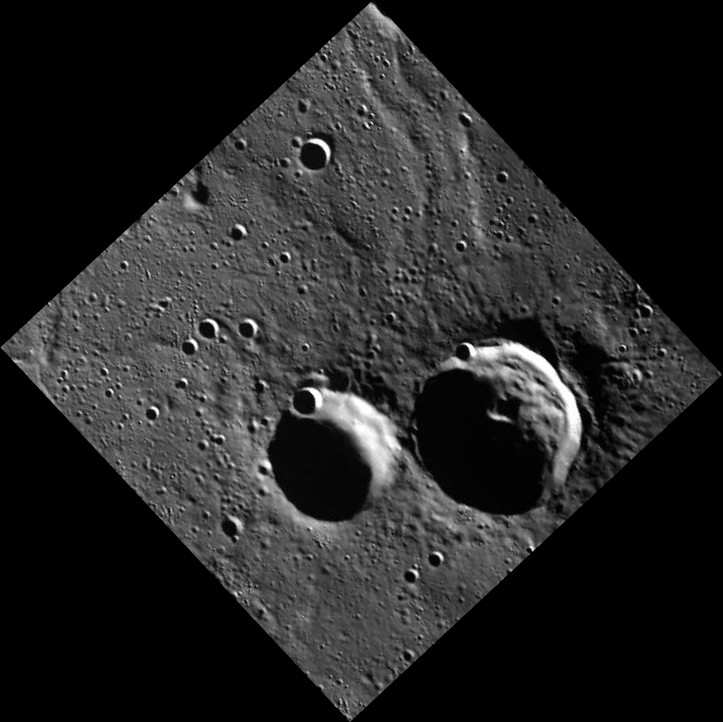
- MESSENGER WAC image of Rikyū (left) and Varma (right) craters
- Planet: Mercury
- Coordinates: 79.91°N 22.74°W
- Quadrangle: Borealis
- Diameter: 22.39 km (13.91 mi)
- Eponym: Sen no Rikyū

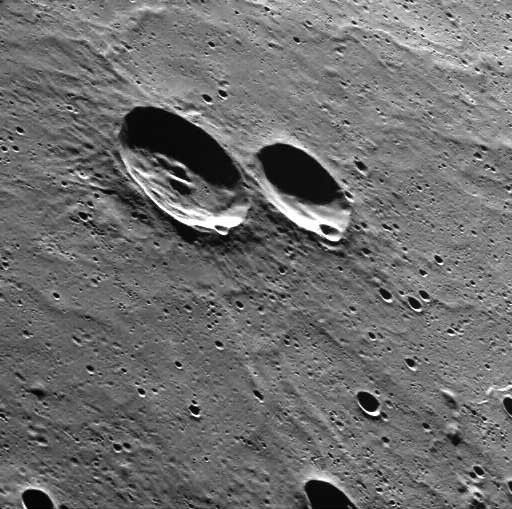
Oblique view of Rikyū (right) and Varma (left) craters

Rikyū is a crater on Mercury. Its name was adopted by the International Astronomical Union (IAU) on June 18, 2013. Rikyū is named for Japanese tea master and designer of the Japanese tea ceremony Sen no Rikyū.

Rikyū is west of the slightly larger crater Varma.
