= Horse hair raku =

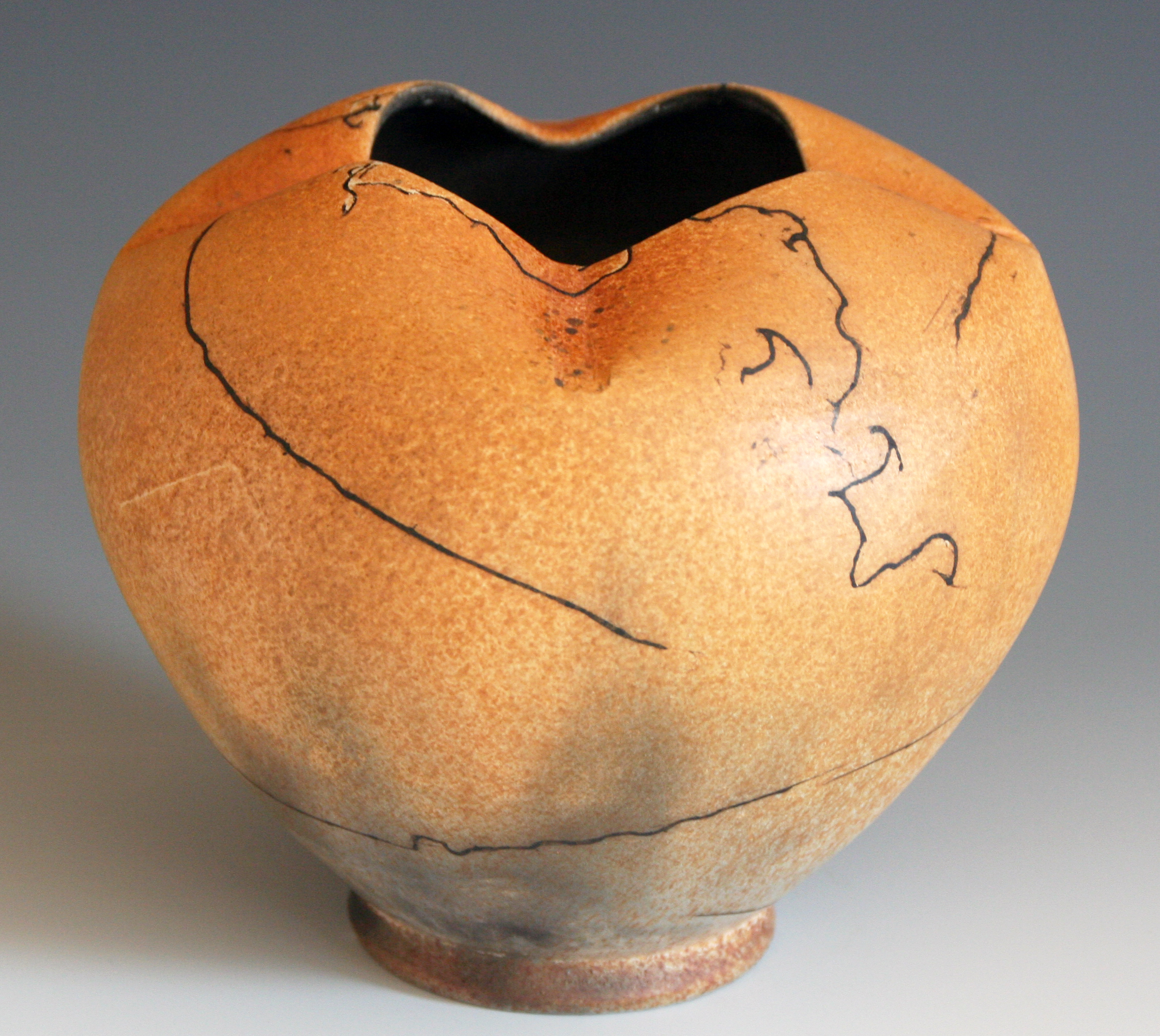
Horse hair vase

Horse hair raku is a method of decorating pottery through the application of horsehair and other dry carbonaceous material to the heated ware. The burning carbonaceous material creates smoke patterns and carbon trails on the surface of the heated ware that remain as decoration after the ware cools. Although preparation is similar to pit fired pottery and other primitive firing techniques, horsehair raku is generally considered an alternative form of Western-style Raku ware, because it uses Western-style Raku kilns, firing techniques and tools.

Horsehair raku usually utilizes burnishing and/or Terra sigillata techniques to prepare the unglazed surface before Bisque firing. The bisque ware is heated in a kiln, then removed while still extremely hot. The decorating is performed when the ware is between 480 and 700 °C; lower temperatures do not effectively combust the horsehair and other materials, while higher temperatures cause the carbon makings to burn off leaving no lasting decorative effect, though success with horsehair has been achieved at temperatures up to 1000 °C. Strands of horsehair laid across hot ware leave a wandering linear smoke design on the surface. Other materials which can be used to create surface effects include sugar sprinkled on the hot surface to leave spotted smoke marks and feathers applied to the hot surface to give dark, feather shaped silhouettes.

It is not known precisely how horsehair pottery was first developed, but several stories connect the beginnings of this technique to Native American Pueblo women.
