= Chōjirō =

16th century potter based in Kyoto, Japan; first generation of Raku line of potters

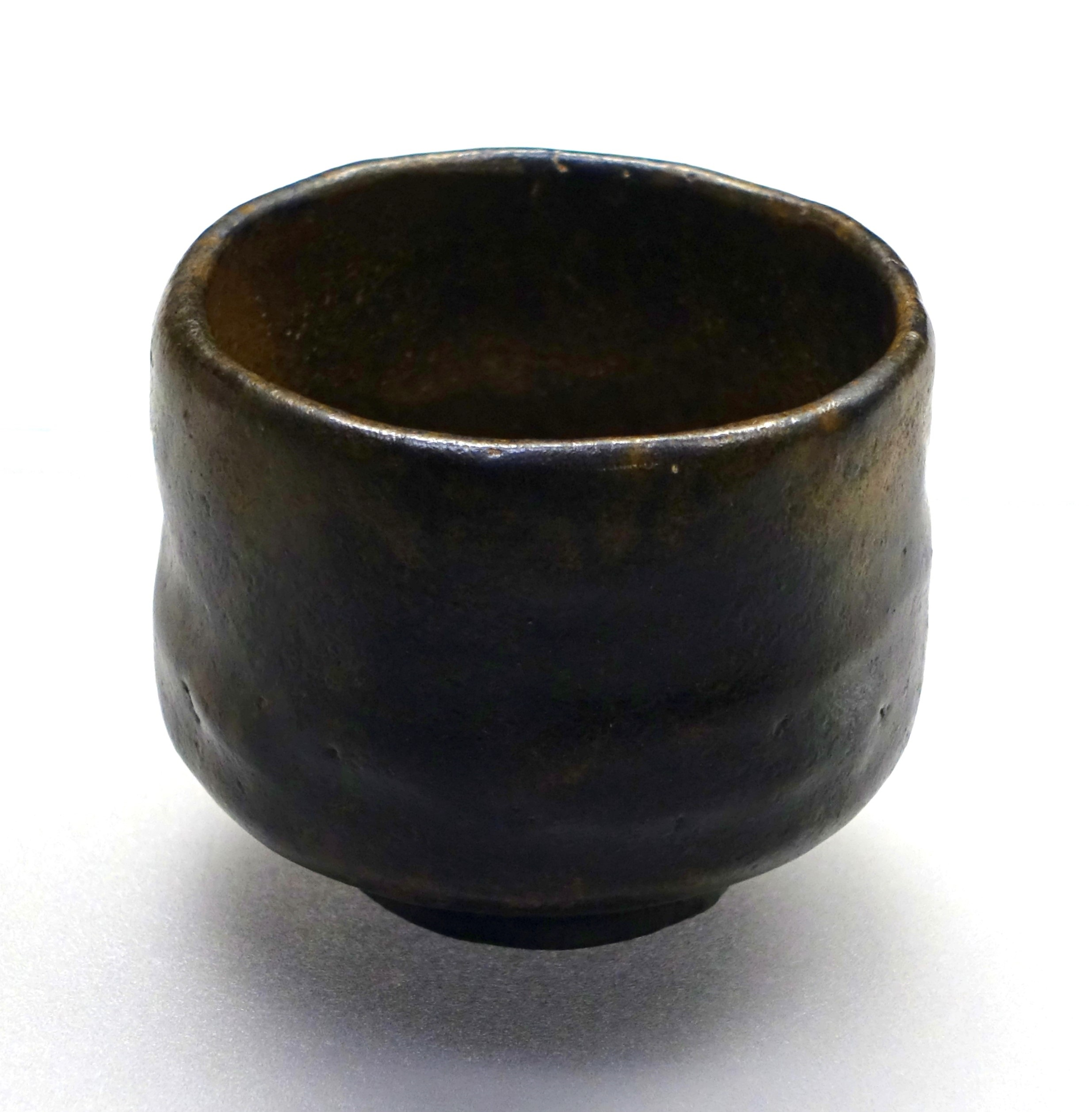
Tea bowl, known as Suchiro, studio of Chōjirō

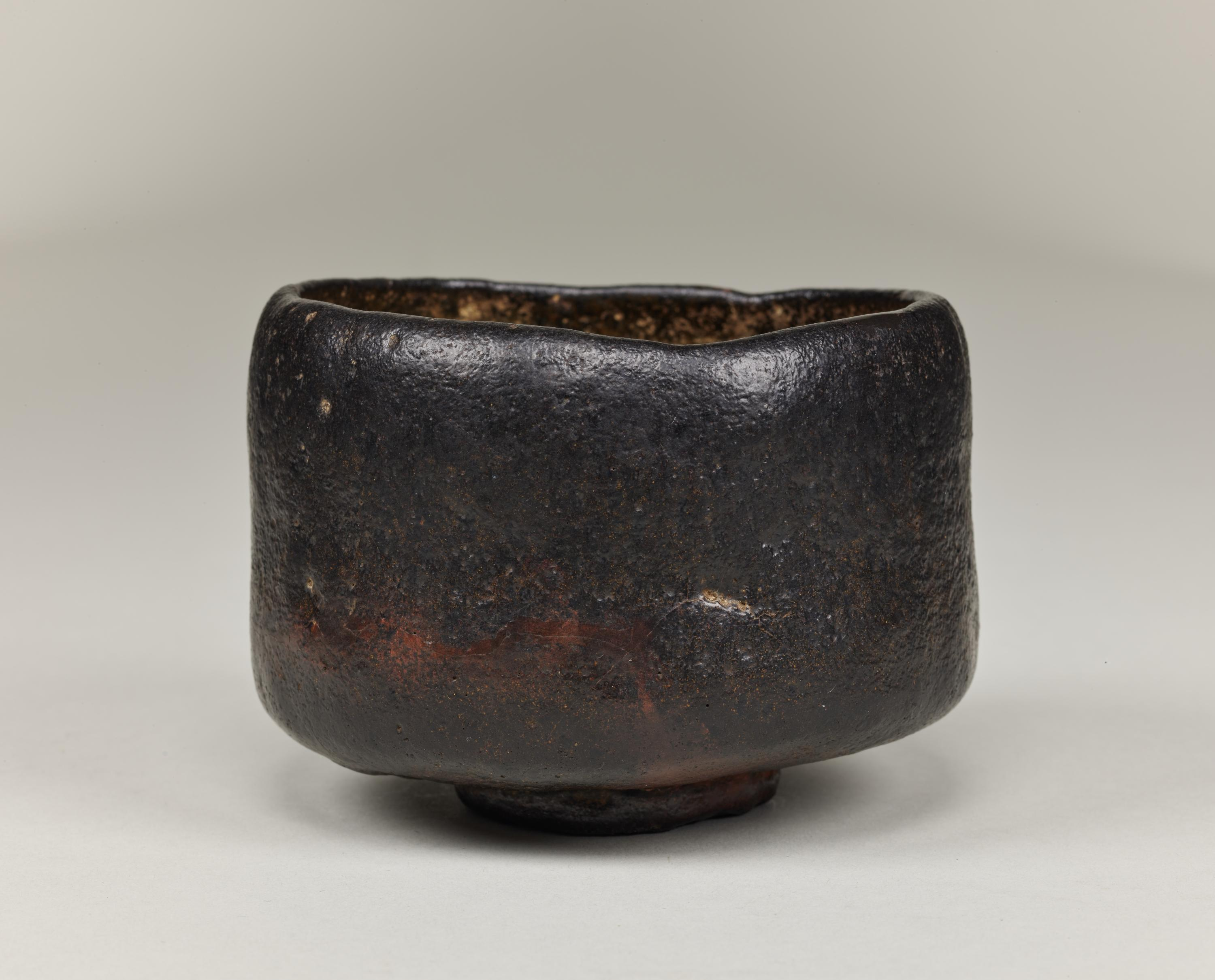
Tea bowl exemplifying Chojiro's Wabi style

Chōjirō (長次郎) (1516-1592) is distinguished as the first generation in the Raku family of potters. Chojiro is the creator of Raku-ware, as well as the founder of the Raku kiln.

== Career ==
While producing ridge tiles for Toyotomi Hideyoshi's Jurakudai Palace in 1574, Chojiro's exceptional talent working with clay was noticed by Sen no Rikyu, the Emperor's influential teamaster. Rikyu commissioned Chojiro to make tea wares for Emperor Hideyoshi's tea ceremonies that reflected Zen Buddhists philosophies of harmony, respect, purity, and tranquility.

Chojiro produced simple tea bowls, unpretentious, without surface decoration or any individual expression. They were hand built, not wheel thrown, and never perfectly symmetrical. His tea bowls were comfortable to hold in hand and made a quiet dull "tunk" sound when placed on a table. He produced them in black or red.

Chojiro's tea wares were exactly in the spirit of Wabi, and highly prized for their spiritual meaning and presence. At first, the tea bowls were called ima-yaki, which translates to "now-wares", made in the present. According to the Raku Ware Museum in Kyoto, Japan, their website, raku-yaki.or.jp states that Chojiro's ima-yaki was quite avant-garde at the time.

Chojiro had a young apprentice, Jokei, and passed his technique of pottery making on to him. It was six years after Chojiro died, in 1598, that Emperor Hideyoshi bestowed a gold seal to Jokei, in memory of Chojiro and the tea ware. The gold seal bore the ideograph "raku", the center symbol from Hideyoshi's pleasure pavilion, Ju-raku-dai. The symbol stood for enjoyment, happiness, nothing better in the world, contentment, pleasure, or joy. From this time on, the tea ware became known as Juraku-Yaki, which translates to "Juraku-Wares", and for short, raku-ware.

"Raku", from the moment of Hideyoshi bestowing the golden seal to Jokei, became the name of the lineage that produced pots in this manner. The Raku name has been passed on through hundreds of years of generations. We are currently in the 16th generation of Rakus, with Kichizaemon XVI (b.1981), who succeeded as generation master in 2019; all beginning with Chojiro.

Tea bowls made by Chojiro

Seven tea bowls made by Chojiro were singled out as masterpieces by Rikyu himself and became known later as the uchi shichishu (inner seven).

=== Rikyū Shichishu (inner seven) ===
- Ōguro (大黒) – black raku
- Hachihiraki (鉢開) – black raku; no longer extant
- Tōyōbō (東陽坊) – black raku
- Hayafune (早船) – red raku; Hatakeyama Memorial Museum
- Kenkyō (検校) – red raku
- Rinzai (臨済) – red raku
- Kimamori (木守) – red raku; destroyed in the 1923 Great Kantō earthquake

=== Soto Shichishu (outer seven) ===
- Kandori (雁取) – black raku
- Koguro (小黒) – black raku; whereabouts unknown
- Kankyo (閑居) – black raku
- Ichimonji (一文字) – red raku
- Tarōbō (太郎坊) – red raku
- Hijiri (聖) – red raku
- Yokogumo (横雲) – red raku

=== Other notable bowls ===
- Muichimotsu (無一物) – red raku; Egawa Museum of Art
- Shunkan (俊寛) – black raku; Mitsui Memorial Museum
- Kamuro (禿) – black raku; Omotesenke Fushin-an
- Modoya-guro (万代屋黒) – black raku; Raku Museum
- Muki-guri (ムキ栗) – black raku; Agency for Cultural Affairs
- Kitano (北野) – black raku
- Jirōbō (次郎坊) – red raku
- Sensei (千声) – Gotoh Museum
- Sabisuke (さび介) – Homma Museum of Art
- Makomo (まこも) – Fujita Museum
- Ayame (あやめ)
- Rikyū (利休) – black raku; private collection

== Family ==
Chojiro was the son of Ameya, a potter from Fujian, China, who invented a low-fire technique known as "Three Color Ware", and then along with others, migrated to Japan, introducing this technique that Chojiro eventually learned from him. Chojiro's mother, Teirin, was a potter, and is believed to have made the first raku style pot around 1550, about twenty-five years before the name Raku had been bestowed up the style. Her country of origin is unknown.
