= 0T =

0T (zero T) or 0-T may refer to:

- Lemon tea, Hong Kong beverage, cha chaan teng abbreviation (see Cha chaan teng#Common phrases and abbreviations)
- 0t, or Zero temperature, alternate term for absolute zero
- One of several Whyte notations for steam locomotive classifications
  - 0-4-0T, variant of 0-4-0
  - 0-6-0T, variant of 0-6-0
    - Bristol and Exeter Railway 0-6-0T locomotives
    - List of preserved Hunslet Austerity 0-6-0ST locomotives
    - LMS Fowler Class 3F
    - GWR Sir Watkin Class
  - 0-10-0T, variant of 0-10-0
  - 2-4-0T, variant of 2-4-0
    - South Devon Railway 2-4-0 locomotives
    - Highland Railway O Class
  - 2-6-0T, variant of 2-6-0
  - 2-8-0T, variant of 2-8-0
  - 4-4-0T, variant of 4-4-0
    - Bristol and Exeter Railway 4-4-0T locomotives
  - 4-8-0T, variant of 4-8-0
    - South African Class 13 4-8-0T+T

== See also ==
- T0 (disambiguation)
- OT
