= T0 =

T0 or T00 may refer to:

== Science and technology ==
- T_{0} space, a Kolmogorov space
- T0, a level on the tornado TORRO scale
- T−0, the end of a rocket's launch countdown and the beginning of flight

== Other uses ==
- Avianca Perú (former IATA code: T0), a former airline
- Chambers County Airport (FAA LID: T00), Texas, US
- HMNZS Wakakura (T00), a First World War Royal New Zealand Navy Castle class naval trawler
- Same-day affirmation, of a trade in finance

== See also ==
- Tzero, an electric sports car
- 0T (disambiguation)
