= Seven necessities =

Chinese phrase

- Traditional Chinese: 開門七件事：柴米油鹽醬醋茶
- Simplified Chinese: 开门七件事：柴米油盐酱醋茶
- Literal meaning: open door 7 items-of-affairs: firewood, rice, oil, salt, sauce, vinegar, tea
Transcriptions
Standard Mandarin
- Hanyu Pinyin: Kāimén qī jiàn shì: cháimǐyóuyánjiàngcùchá
Yue: Cantonese
- Yale Romanization: Hōi mùhn chāt gihn sih: chàaih máih yàuh yìhm jeung chou chàh
- Jyutping: Hoi1 mun4 cat1 gin6 si6: caai4 mai5 jau4 jim4 zoeng3 cou3 caa4

The seven necessities stem from the phrase "Firewood, rice, oil, salt, sauce, vinegar and tea are the seven necessities to begin a day". The items were known as early as the Song dynasty travel book, Dreams of the Former Capital.

The Chinese phrase "seven necessities" literally means "開 open 門 door 七 seven 件事 items" when translated, which is an old Chinese saying. They include firewood (柴 chái), rice (米 mĭ), oil (油 yóu), salt (鹽 yán), sauce (醬 jiàng), vinegar (醋 cù), tea (茶 chá). The seven necessities were made popular in modern tea culture due to the fact the beverage was mentioned as one of the seven necessities of Chinese life.
