= Tea culture =

Culture of tea

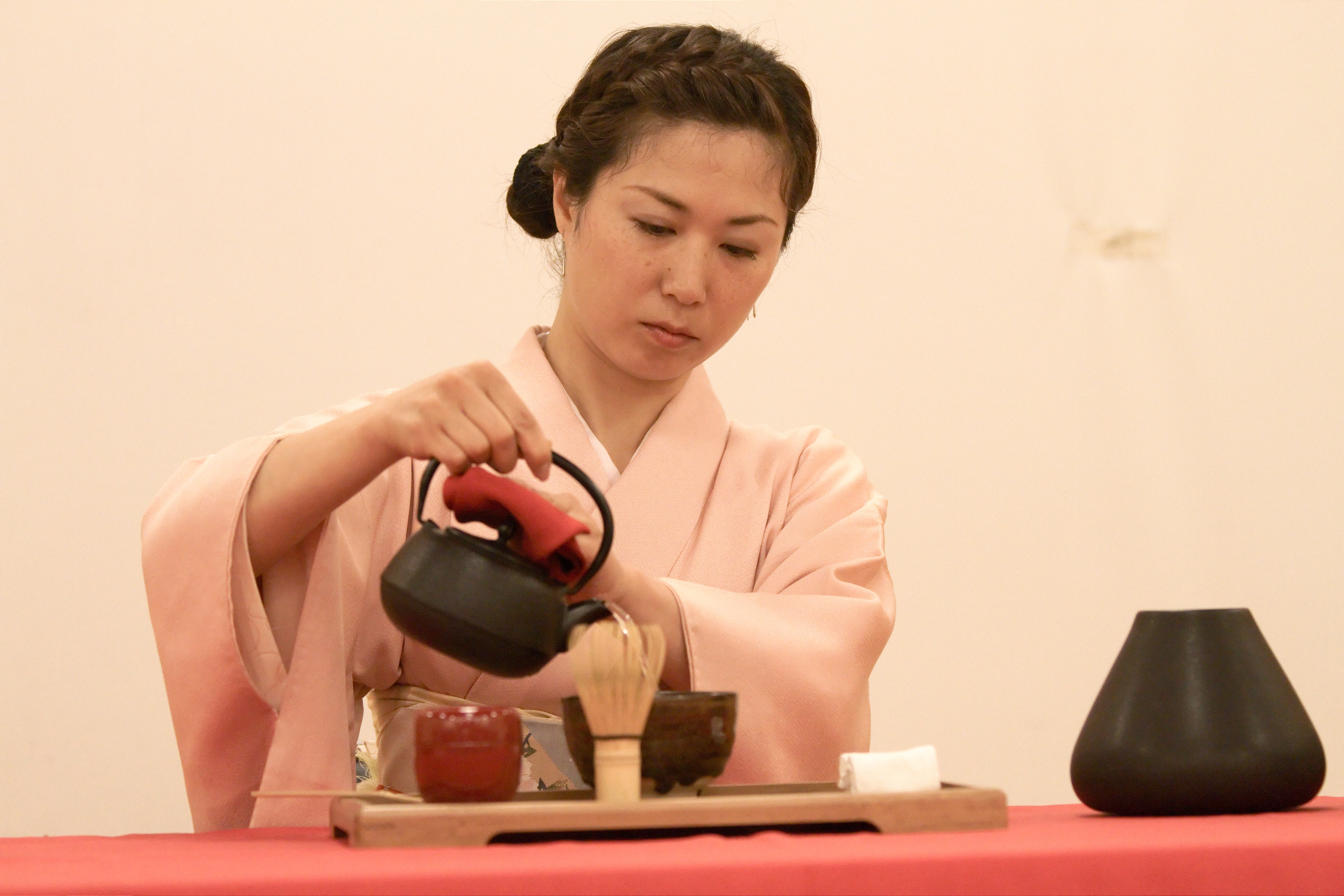
A Japanese woman performs a Japanese tea ceremony (sadō/chadō, 茶道).

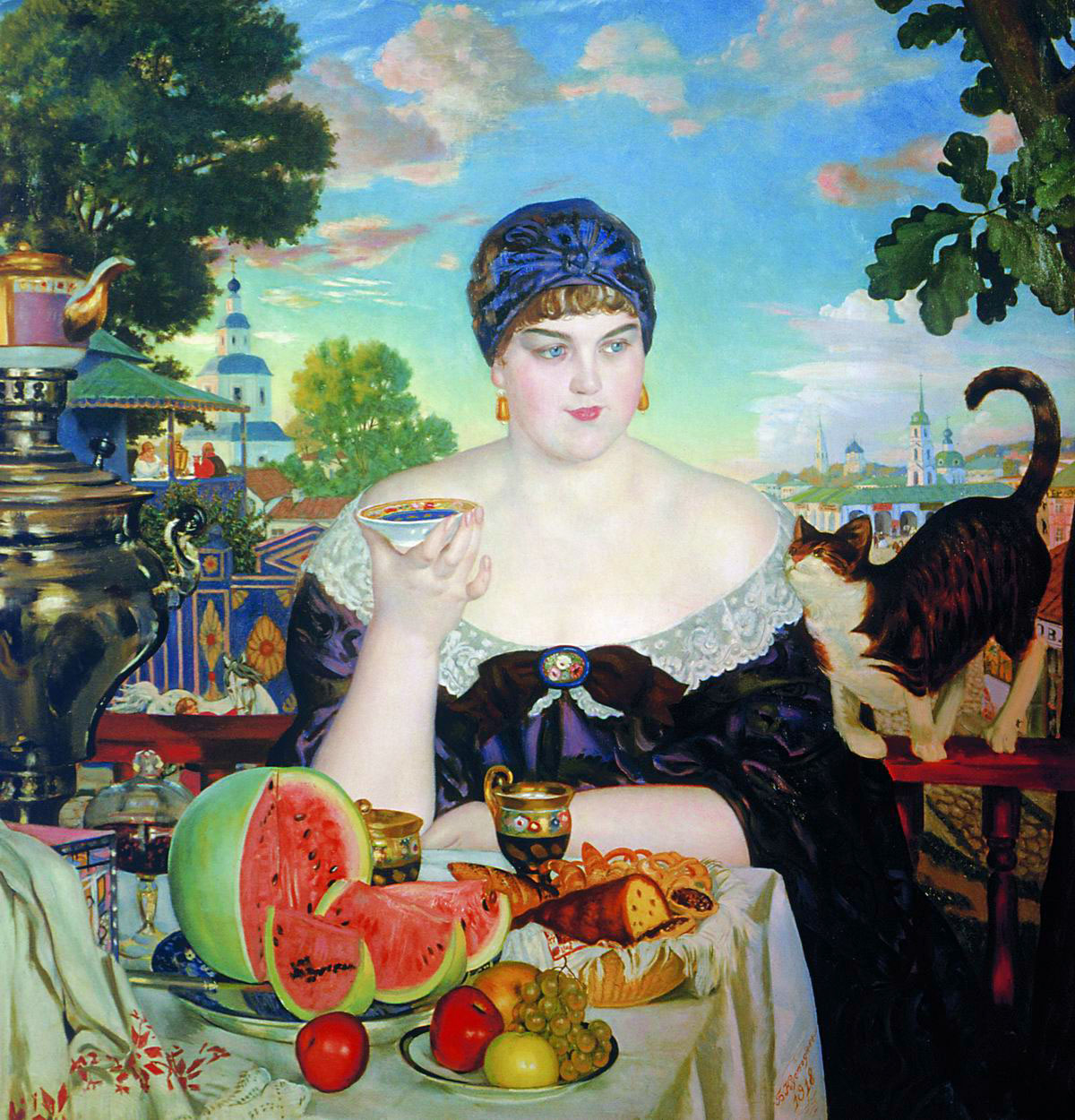
Merchant’s Wife at Tea (Boris Kustodiev, 1918) is a portrayal of Russian tea culture.

Tea culture is the culture around the preparation and drinking of tea and the private and social settings in which this occurs.

Tea plays an important role in some countries. It is commonly consumed at social events, and many cultures have created intricate formal ceremonies for these events. East Asian tea ceremonies, with their roots in the Chinese tea culture, differ slightly among East Asian countries, such as the Japanese or Korean variants. Tea may differ widely in preparation, such as in Tibet, where the beverage is commonly brewed with salt and butter. Tea may be drunk in small private gatherings (tea parties), in public (tea houses designed for social interaction), and in everyday settings such as homes and workplaces.

Afternoon tea is a British custom with widespread appeal. The British Empire spread an interpretation of tea to its dominions and colonies, including modern-day regions of Hong Kong, India, and Pakistan, which had pre-existing tea customs, as well as regions such as East Africa (modern-day Kenya, Tanzania, and Uganda), the Pacific (Australia and New Zealand), and Canada, which did not have tea customs, or countries that received high British immigration, such as Chile. The tea room or teahouse is found in the US, Ireland, and many Commonwealth cities.

Different regions favor different varieties of tea—white, yellow, green, oolong, black, or post-fermented (dark)—and use different flavorings, such as herbs, milk, or sugar. The temperature and strength of the tea likewise vary widely.

== East Asia ==
=== China ===
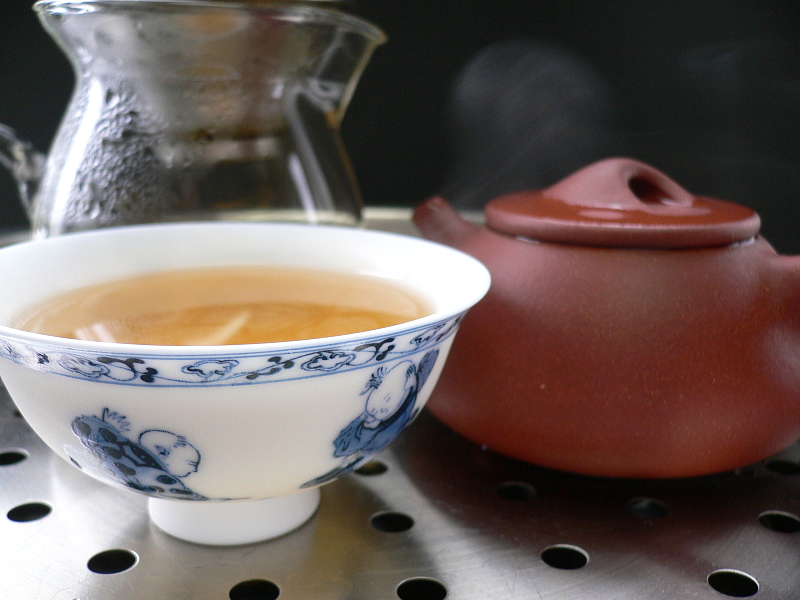
Chinese tea, gancha

Due to the importance of tea in Chinese society and culture, tea houses can be found in most Chinese neighborhoods and business districts. Chinese-style tea houses offer dozens of varieties of hot and cold tea concoctions. They also serve a variety of tea-friendly or tea-related snacks. Beginning in the late afternoon, the typical Chinese tea house quickly becomes packed with students and business people, and later at night, it plays host to insomniacs and night owls simply looking for a place to relax.

There are formal tea houses. They provide a range of Chinese and Japanese tea leaves, tea-making accoutrements, and a better class of snack food. Finally, some tea vendors specialize in selling tea leaves, pots, and other related paraphernalia. Tea is an essential item in Chinese culture and is mentioned in the seven necessities of (Chinese) daily life.

During the Tang dynasty, Lu Yu found that the plants that grow under shady hillsides produced poor-quality tea, often resulting in abdominal distension. The common tea-making methods at the time were boiling the water and tea leaves simultaneously. The water was heated in a cauldron on a brazier to the first boil level, described as "fish eyes." Appropriate salts were added to the water to enhance the flavor of the tea.

In China, at least as early as the Tang dynasty, tea was an object of connoisseurship; in the Song dynasty, formal tea-tasting parties were held, comparable to modern wine tastings. As in contemporary wine tastings, the proper vessel was necessary, and much attention was paid to matching the tea to an aesthetically appealing serving vessel. The Song also saw the rise in popularity of "tea wars" or tea competitions in which people competed to make the best cup of whipped powdered tea. In these competitions, a main judge was appointed who would judge the foam, style and taste of the tea.

Two main eras of Chinese tea

Historically, there were two phases of tea drinking in China based on the form of tea that was produced and consumed: tea bricks versus loose leaf tea.

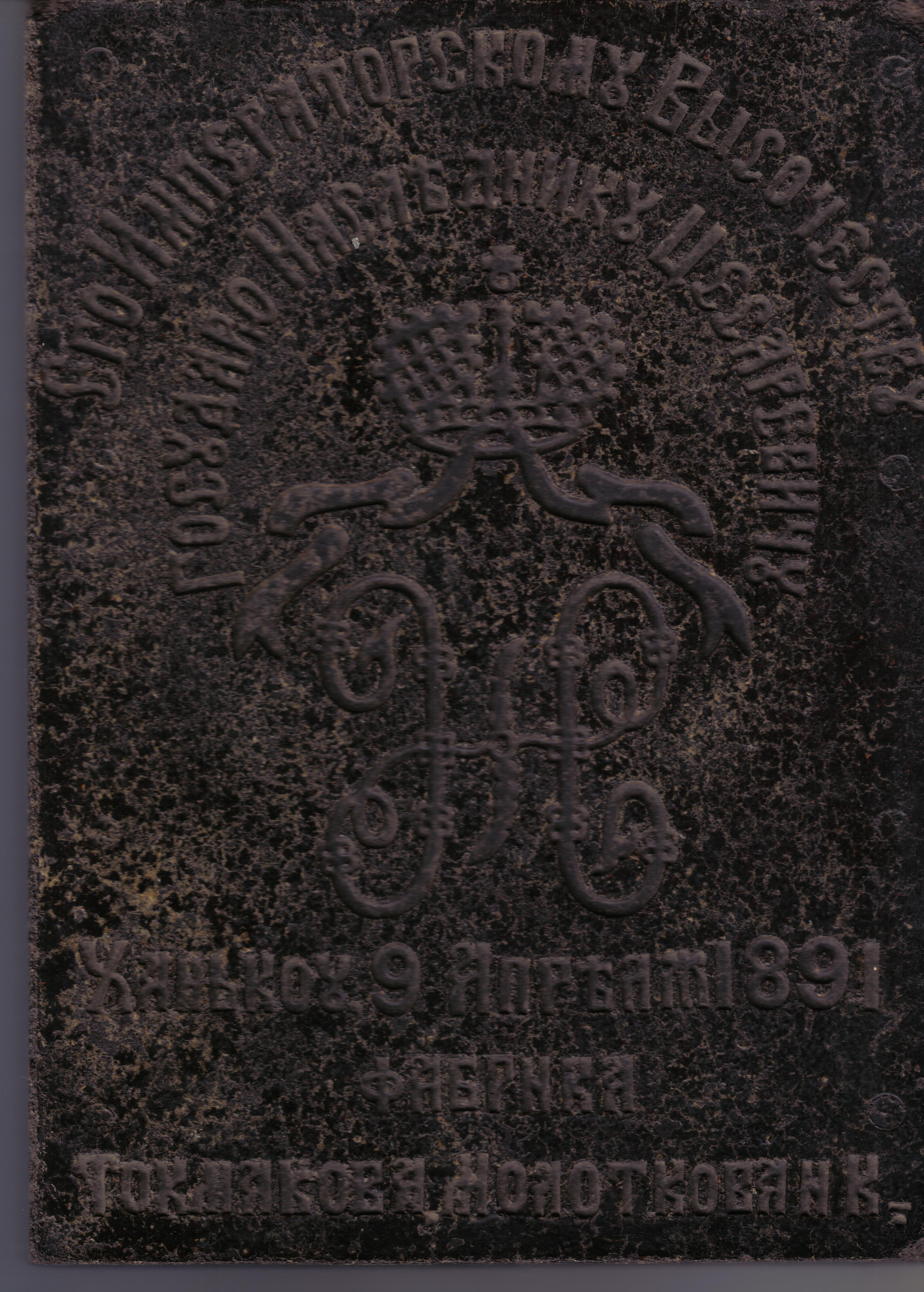
A tea brick made for the Russian Imperial Army of Tsar Nicholas II

Tea served before the Ming dynasty was typically made from tea bricks. Upon harvesting, the tea leaves were either partially dried or thoroughly dried and ground before being pressed into bricks. The pressing of Pu-erh is likely a relic of this process. Tea bricks were also sometimes used as currency. Serving the tea from tea bricks required roasting (to destroy mold or insects), grinding the leaves to a fine powder and whisking the tea in hot water to produce a fine broth.

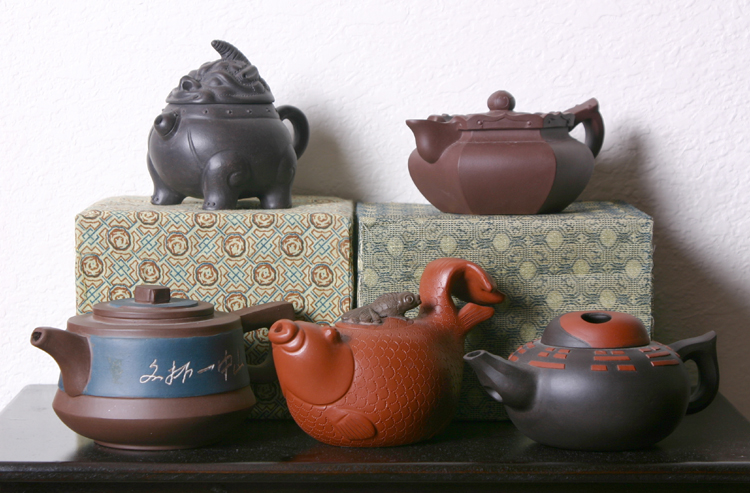
Five Yixing clay teapots showing a variety of styles from formal to whimsical

After 1391, the Hongwu Emperor, the founder of the Ming dynasty, decreed that tributes of tea to the court were to be changed from brick to loose-leaf form. The imperial decree quickly transformed the tea-drinking habits of the people, changing from whisked teas to steeped teas. The arrival of the new method for preparing tea also required the creation or use of new teawares types, including teapots, tea caddies and new smaller teacups. Loose-leaf tea and purple clay teaware are still the preferred tea preparation methods in Chinese daily life.

=== Hong Kong ===
The British-style black tea with milk has evolved into a new local style of drink, the Hong Kong-style milk tea, more often simply "milk tea" in Hong Kong, by using evaporated milk instead of ordinary milk. It is popular at cha chaan tengs and fast food shops such as Café de Coral and Fairwood. Traditional Chinese teas, including green tea, flower tea, jasmine tea, and pu-erh tea, are also common and are served at dim sum restaurants during yum cha.

Another Hong Kong specialty is lemon tea, served in cafes and restaurants as regular black tea with several slices of fresh lemon, either hot or cold, with sugar for hot version, and syrup for cold version add to taste. In 1979, local drinks manufacturer Vitasoy introduced a packaged brand, which remains popular and is gaining market traction in mainland China. Other brands followed suit in Hong Kong.

=== Japan ===
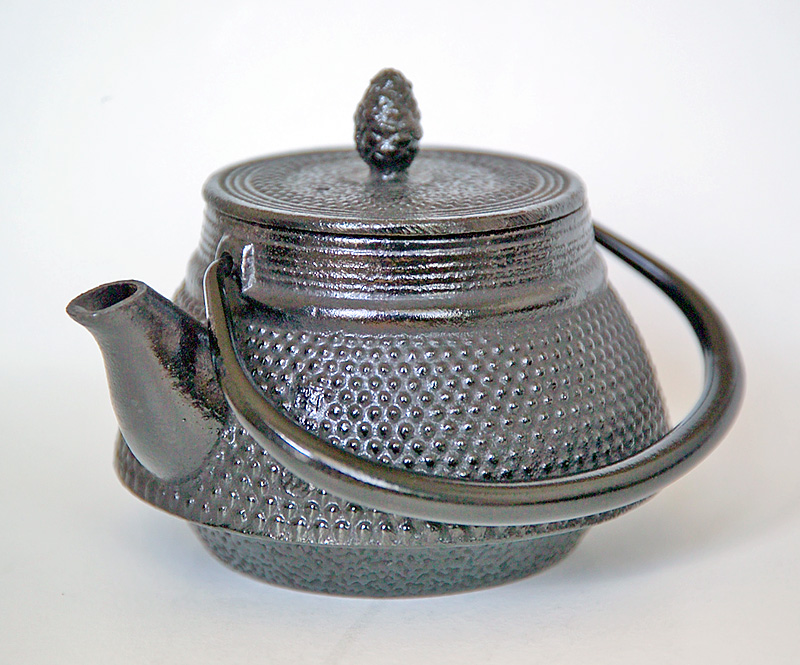
A one-cup-sized, glazed Japanese cast-iron teapot from the Tōhoku region, intended for collectors

Green tea's traditional role in Japanese society is as a drink for special guests and occasions. Green tea is served in many companies during afternoon breaks. Japanese often buy sweets for their colleagues when on vacation or business trips. These snacks are usually consumed with green tea. Tea will also be prepared for visitors coming for company meetings and guests visiting Japanese homes. A thermos full of green tea is a staple on family or school outings as an accompaniment to bento (box lunches). Families often bring along Japanese teacups to enhance their enjoyment of the drink.

The strong cultural association Japan has with green tea has made it the most popular beverage to drink in traditional Japanese cuisine, such as sushi, sashimi, and tempura. At a restaurant, a cup of green tea is often served with meals at no extra charge, with as many refills as desired. The best traditional Japanese restaurants take as much care in choosing the tea they serve as in preparing the food.

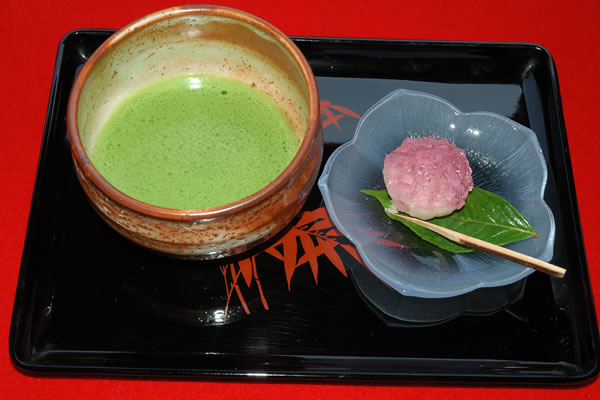
A cup of matcha tea and a piece of sweet cake

Many Japanese are still taught the proper art of the centuries-old tea ceremony as well. Still, the Japanese now drink green tea processed using modern technology, and hand pressing is taught only as a technique to preserve cultural tradition and demonstrated to tourists. Most ubiquitous vending machines also carry a wide selection of hot and cold bottled teas. Oolong tea is popular, and black tea, often with milk or lemon, is served ubiquitously in cafes, coffee shops, and restaurants.

Major tea-producing areas in Japan include Shizuoka Prefecture and the city of Uji in Kyoto Prefecture.

Other infusions bearing the name cha are barley tea (mugi-cha), which is popular as a cold drink in the summer; buckwheat tea (soba-cha); and hydrangea tea (ama-cha).

=== Korea ===
The Korean tea ceremony, or darye (茶禮), is a traditional form of tea ceremony practised in Korea. Darye literally refers to "etiquette for tea" or "tea rite." The chief element of the Korean tea ceremony is the ease and naturalness of drinking tea in an easy, formal setting. Central to the Korean approach to tea is an easy and natural coherence, with fewer formal rituals, fewer absolutes, greater freedom for relaxation, and more creativity in drinking a wider variety of teas, services, and conversations.

=== Mongolia ===
In Mongolia, suutei tsai is a traditional beverage of tea with milk. Variations in the recipe include using green or black tea, butter, or fat. Fresh whole milk is often preferred, and adjusting the salt content is common. Fried millet is a common addition, and the tea is often derived from compressed tea blocks. Historically, Mongols favoured milk-based drinks due to beliefs about water's sanctity. The practise was noted by the Franciscan friar William of Rubruck in the 13th century. Suutei tsai is a staple in Mongolian culture, often served during meals and to guests visiting a yurt. Its unique flavour, including the presence of salt, can be an acquired taste, and it's commonly consumed with boortsog (fried biscuit) or dumplings. Instant versions of Suutei Tsai are also available. Suutei tsai is commonly used for special occasions such as Tsagaan Sar and Naadam.

=== Taiwan ===
Taiwanese tea culture encompasses a more traditional Chinese tea culture, followed by centuries of Han Chinese migrations onto the island. Wild tea was first found in Taiwan by the Dutch East India Company. Since then, successive waves of immigration from mainland China to Taiwan have left a legacy of influences on tea culture.

Bubble tea, pearl milk tea (Chinese: 珍珠奶茶; pinyin: zhēnzhū nǎichá ), or boba milk tea (波霸奶茶; bōbà nǎichá) is a tea beverage mixture with milk that includes balls of tapioca. Originating in Taiwan, it is especially popular in East Asia and Southeast Asia, including Japan, South Korea, China, Hong Kong, Thailand, Malaysia, the Philippines, Vietnam, and Singapore, as well as India, Sri Lanka, Europe, Canada, and the United States. It is also known as black pearl tea or tapioca tea.

=== Tibet ===
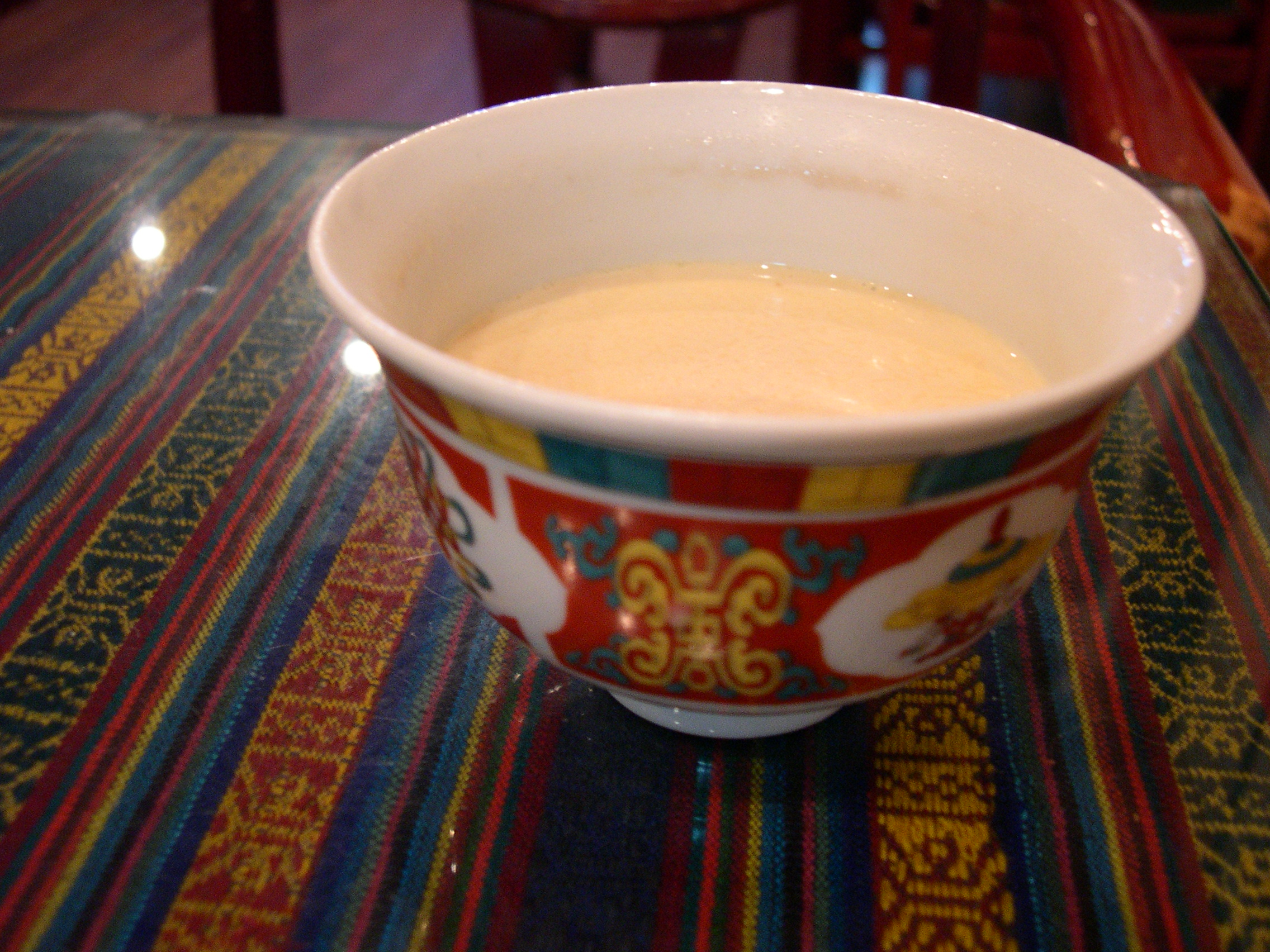
Butter tea in a bowl

Butter, milk, and salt are added to brewed tea and churned to form a hot drink called po cha (bod ja, where bod means Tibetan and ja means tea) in Tibet, Bhutan, and Nepal. The concoction is sometimes called cha su mar, mainly in Kham, or Eastern Tibet. Traditionally, the drink is made with domestic brick tea and yak's milk, then mixed in a churn for several minutes. Using generic black tea, milk, and butter and shaking or blending work well too, although the unique taste of yak milk is difficult to replicate. (see recipe)

Tibet tea drinking has many rules. One such concern concerns an invitation to a house for tea. The host will first pour some Highland barley wine. The guest must dip his finger in the wine and flick some away. This will be done three times to represent respect for the Buddha, Dharma, and Sangha. The cup will then be refilled two more times, and on the last time, it must be emptied, or the host will be insulted. After this, the host will present a gift of butter tea to the guest, who will accept it without touching the bowl's rim. The guest will then pour a glass for himself and must finish the glass or be seen as rude.

Two main teas go with the tea culture. The teas are butter tea and sweet milk tea. These two teas are only found in Tibet. Other teas drunk in Tibet include boiled black teas. Many tea shops in Tibet sell these teas, which travelers often take as their primary hydration source.

== Southeast Asia ==
=== Indonesia ===
Tea drinking is deeply ingrained in Indonesian culture, with adults and children alike drinking several cups a day, from hot to sweet to cold. There are several notable regional variants of Indonesian tea drink besides the common es teh manis (sweet iced tea).

Teh talua is a Minang tea drink that consists of tea powder, raw egg, sugar, and citrus. It becomes an intangible cultural heritage under the Indonesian Ministry of Education and Culture.

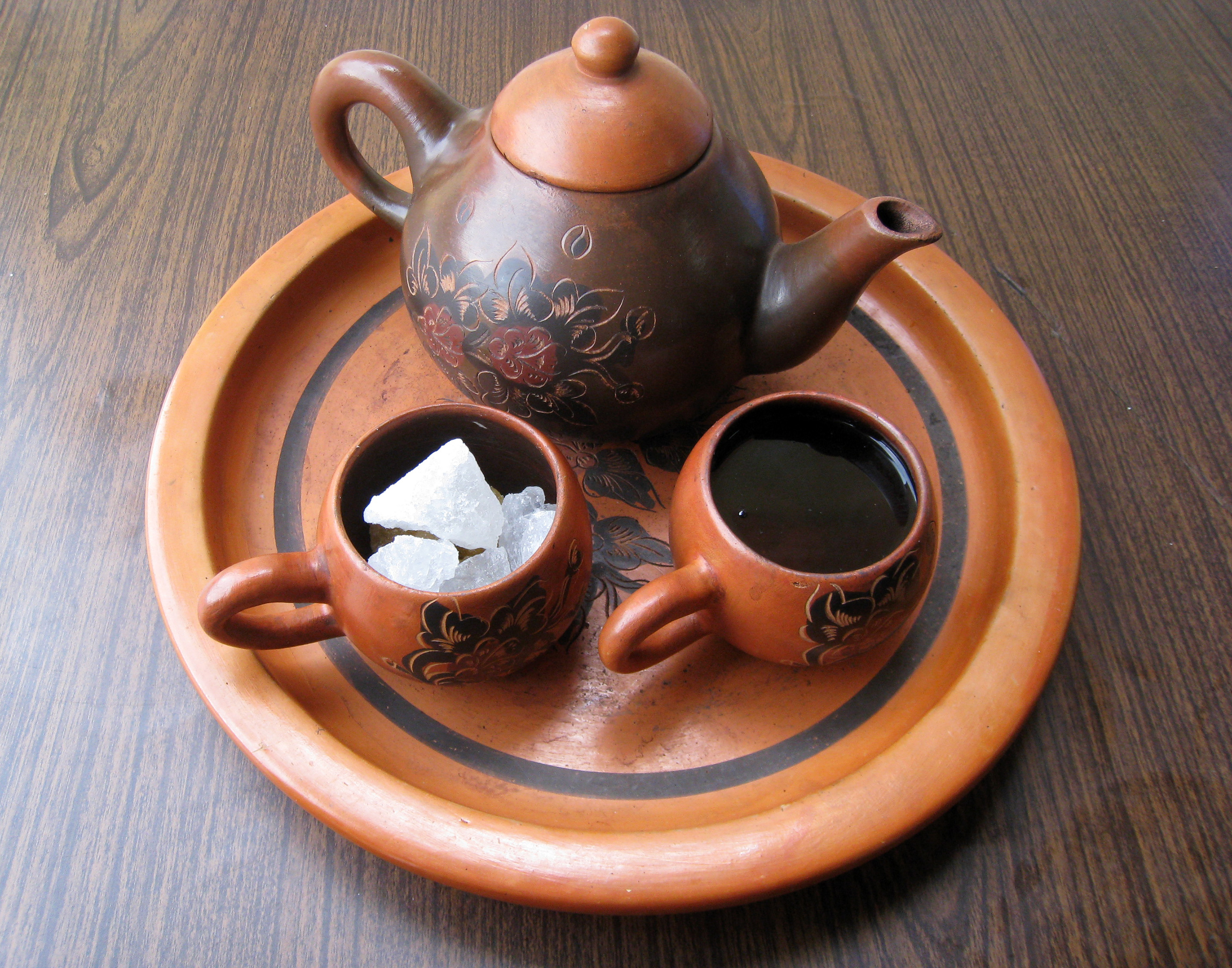
Teh poci claypot with rock sugar

Teh poci is a tea specially brewed in clay pots and cups, drunk hot after gula batu (rock sugar) is added. It usually uses green tea or jasmine tea, which gives off a distinctive aroma, and is usually served in the morning, afternoon, or evening, accompanied by snacks. Teh poci can be easily found in the city of Tegal.

Nyaneut is the name pinned to the tradition of drinking tea typical of the people of Garut. The tradition is usually carried out to welcome the Islamic New Year. At first, Nyaneut began when the Dutch scientist Karel Frederik Hole opened tea plantations in Cigedug and Bayongbong in the 19th century. Since then, the area has been a producer of high-quality tea. Nyaneut has also become a habit for the people of Garut and its surroundings, who are at the foot of Mount Cikurai, to warm their bodies. Usually, tea is served to guests along with a snack in the form of boiled cassava. In the process of drinking tea, it begins by rotating the tea glass in the palm of the hand twice; after that, the aroma of the tea must be inhaled three times first, and then the tea may be drunk.

In Yogyakarta, patehan is part of the Royal Palace of Yogyakarta, which is in charge of preparing drinks, especially tea, along with all the equipment for the needs of the palace, both for traditional ceremonies and for routine daily needs. Water for making tea is taken from a special well called Nyai Jalatunda near the royal tea brewery called Gedhong Patehan. Patehan's daily agenda is to prepare a tea routine for the sultan at 6 a.m. and 11 a.m. The tea is delivered in a procession of five female courtiers.

Betawi people have a tea tradition called nyahi. It is said that the word "nyahi" itself comes from Arabic culture, from the word "syay," which means tea. Nyahi activities are usually done with family or friends in the afternoon, a few hours after lunch time. What is drunk is teh tubruk, which is a drink made from dry tea leaves that is brewed directly without filtering them and placed in a canned teapot or a teapot made of brass. The tradition is usually drunk with coconut sugar. The sweetener will be bitten first, followed by sipping hot tea. It is accompanied by some snacks like kue ape, boiled peanuts, boiled banana, wajik, kue apem, and so on.

=== Malaysia ===
As of 2023, there are over 22.6% Ethnic Chinese who consume a lot of tea culturally. However, it is only in 1929 where the first tea plantation started in Cameron Highlands, situated at 1,500 meters above sea level. The temperature stays on an average of 18 degrees Celsius while the mildly acidic soil is perfect for growing Camellia sinensis. With sunshine all year round with high humidity, the tea leaves are sweet and aromatic. It is mostly the Chinese who drinks in a more traditional method by boiling leaves in a pot and serving in small cups.

After World War Two, the Indian Muslim immigrants working on rubber plantations brought a style called Teh Tarik or "pulled tea" in English. Preparation involves pouring sweetened condensed milk and evaporated milk into a flavorsome black tea before pouring the contents from one cup to another. More experienced baristas are capable of pouring it with maximum hand extension of over 1 meter apart. This style of pouring creates a creamy foam and helps cool the liquid. A thicker froth is associated with a better taste.

=== Myanmar ===
Myanmar is one of the very few countries where tea is not only drunk but eaten as lahpet—pickled tea served with various accompaniments. It is called lahpet so (tea wet) in contrast to lahpet chauk (tea dry) or akyan jauk (crude dry), with which green tea—yeinway jan or lahpet yeijan, meaning plain or crude tea—is made. In the Shan State of Myanmar, where most of the tea is grown, and also in Kachin State, tea is dry-roasted in a pan before adding boiling water to make green tea.

It is the national drink. Tea sweetened with milk is known as lahpet yeijo, made with acho jauk (sweet dry) or black tea and prepared the Indian way, brewed and sweetened with condensed milk. It is a very popular drink, although the middle classes, by and large, appear to prefer coffee most of the time. It was introduced to Myanmar by Indian immigrants, some of whom set up teashops known as kaka hsaing, later evolving to just lahpetyei hsaing (teashop).

It is common for Burmese to gather in tea shops to drink Indian tea served with a diverse range of snacks. Green tea is customarily the first thing to be served free of charge as soon as a customer sits down at a table in all restaurants as well as teashops.

Teashops are extremely prevalent, and are open for breakfast till late in the evening, with some even open for 24-hour catering for long-distance drivers and travellers.

==== Lahpet ====
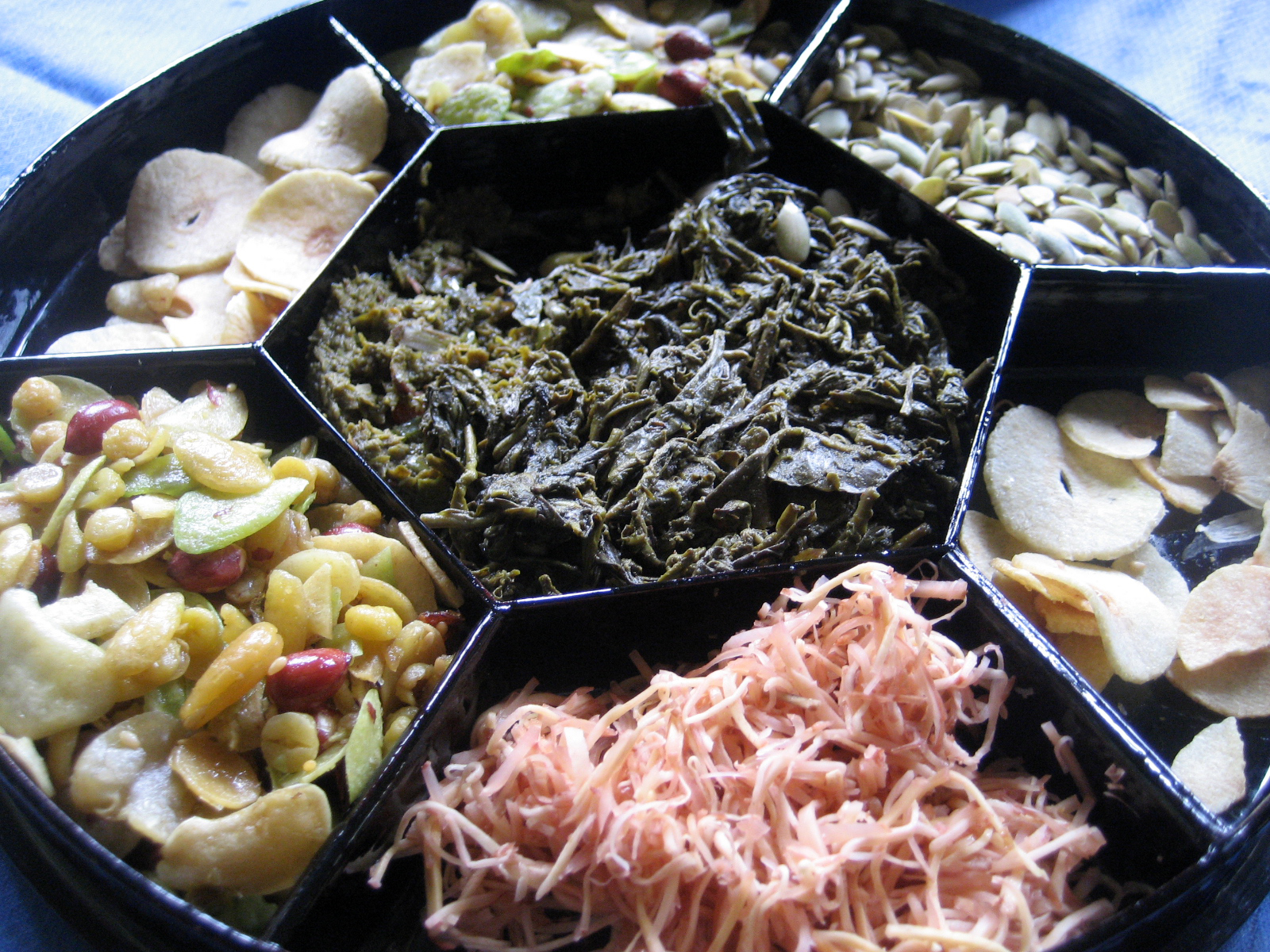
Lahpet served in a lacquer dish

Lahpet (pickled tea) is served in one of two ways:

1. A-hlu lahpet or Mandalay lahpet is served on a plate or traditionally in a shallow lacquerware dish called lahpet ohk with a lid and divided into small compartments—pickled tea laced with sesame oil in a central compartment, and other ingredients such as crisp fried garlic, peas and peanuts, toasted sesame, crushed dried shrimp, preserved shredded ginger, and fried shredded coconut in other compartments encircling it. It may be served as a snack or after a meal with green tea on special occasions or just for family and visitors. A-hlu means alms and is synonymous with a novitiation ceremony called Shinbyu, although lahpet is also served in this form at hsun jway (offering a meal to monks) and weddings. Invitation to a shinbyu is traditionally made by calling from door to door with a lahpet ohk; acceptance is indicated by its participation.
2. Lahpet thouk, or Yangon lahpet, is a pickled tea salad very popular all over Myanmar, especially with women, and some teashops would have it on their menu as well as Burmese restaurants. It is prepared by mixing all the above ingredients without the coconut. It also includes fresh tomatoes, garlic, and green chilli and is dressed with fish sauce, sesame or peanut oil, and a squeeze of lime. Some of the most popular brands sold in packets include Ayee Taung Lahpet from Mandalay, Shwe Toak from Mogok, Yuzana, and Pinpyo Ywetnu from Yangon. Hnapyan jaw (twice fried) ready-mixed garnish is also available today.

=== Thailand ===
Thai tea (also known as Thai iced tea) or "cha-yen" (Thai: ชาเย็น) when ordered in Thailand, is a drink made from strongly brewed red tea that usually contains added anise, red and yellow food colouring, and sometimes other spices as well. This tea is sweetened with sugar and condensed milk and served chilled. Evaporated or whole milk is generally poured over the tea and ice before serving without mixing to add taste and a creamy appearance. Locally, it is served in a traditional tall glass, and when ordered takeout, it is poured over the crushed ice in a transparent (or translucent) plastic bag. It can be made into a frappé at more westernised vendors.

It is popular in Southeast Asia and in many American restaurants that serve Thai or Vietnamese food, especially on the West Coast of the United States. Although Thai tea is not the same as bubble tea, a Southeast and East Asian beverage that contains large black pearls of tapioca starch, Thai tea with pearls is a popular flavour of bubble tea.

Green tea is also prevalent in Thailand, spawning many variations such as barley green tea, rose green tea, lemon green tea, etc. Thai green tea, however, is not to be confused with traditional Japanese green tea. Thai green tea tends to be very heavily commercialised and tastes sweeter.

=== Vietnam ===
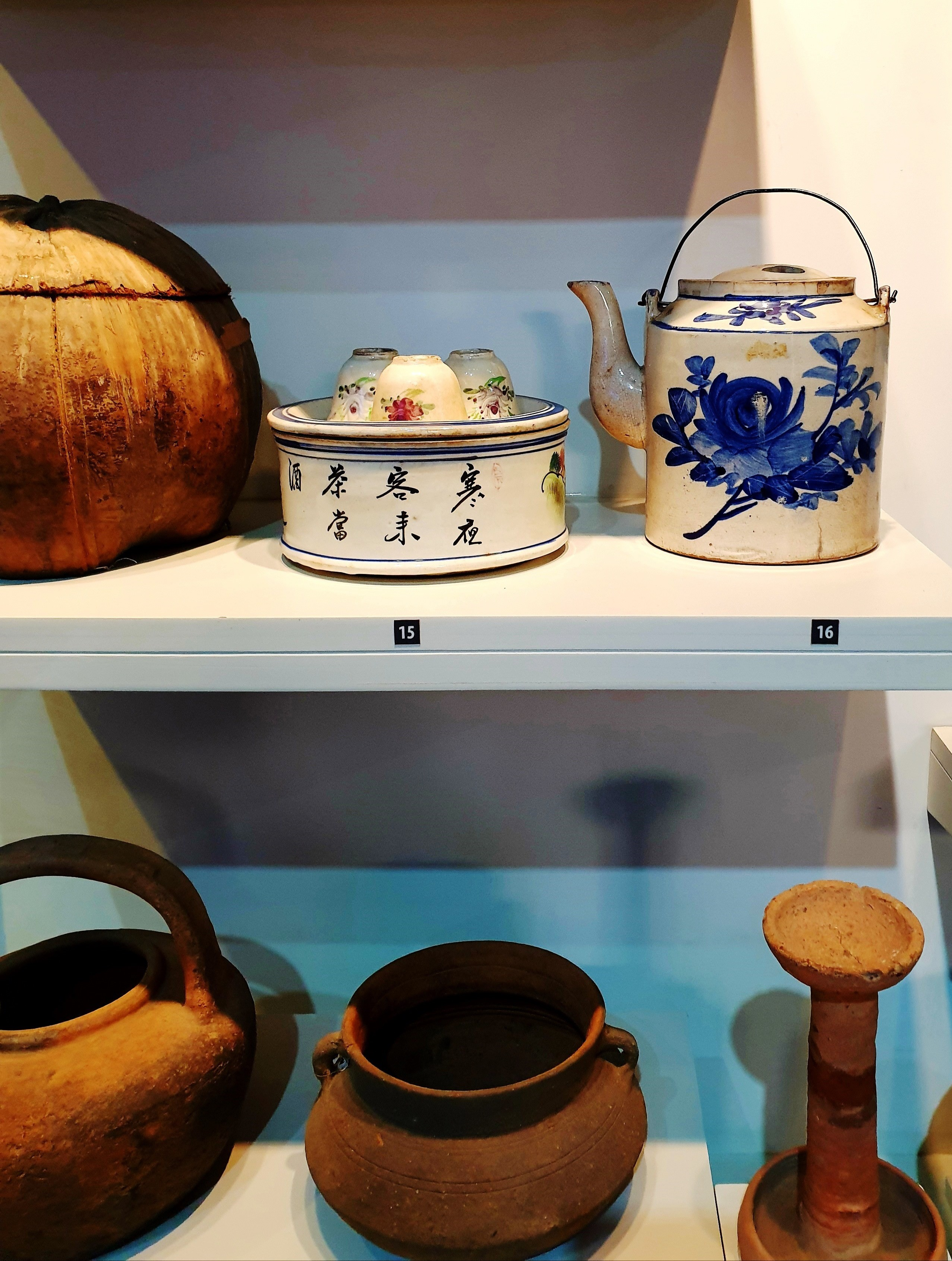
An ancient Vietnamese tea set

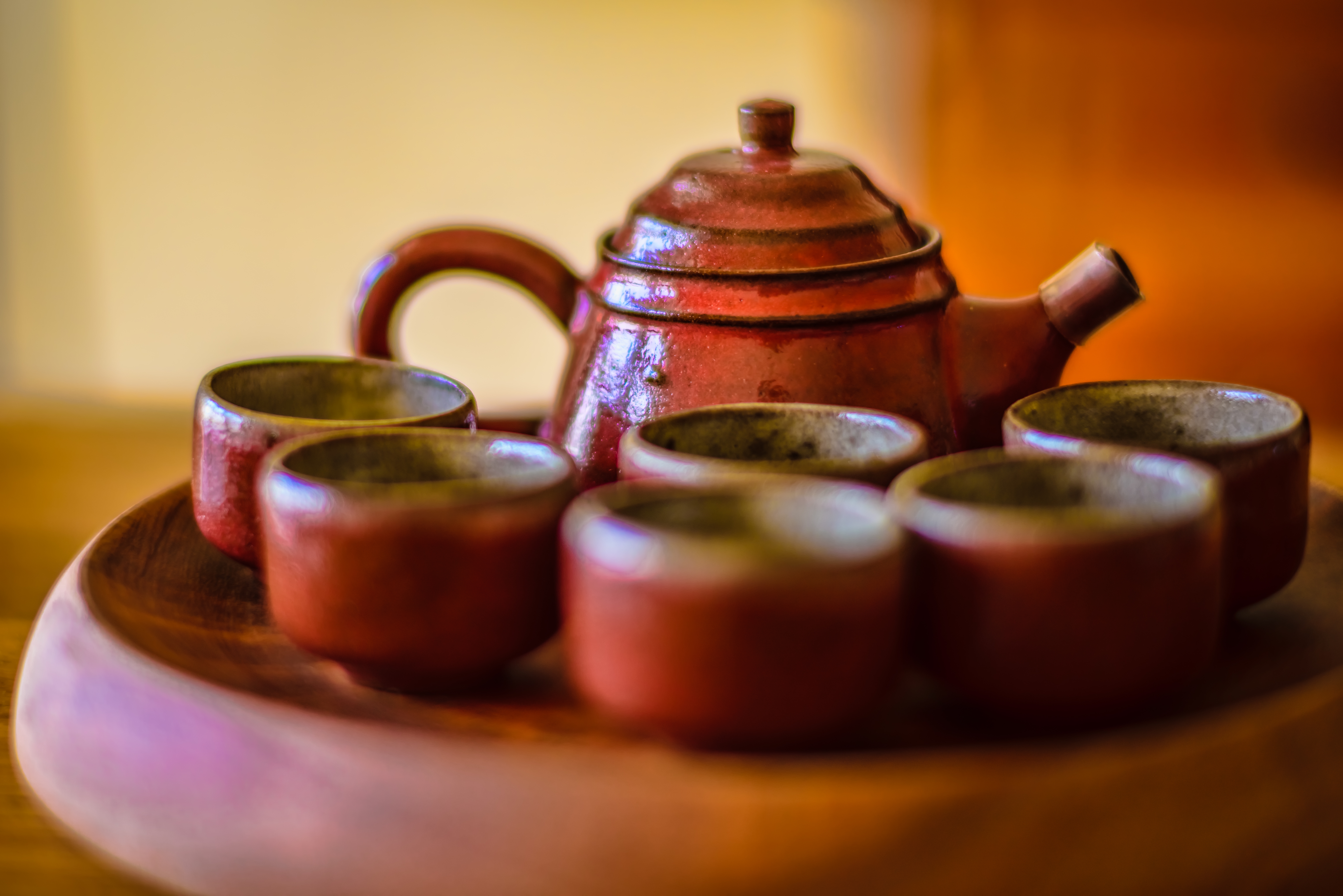
Vietnamese tea set

In modern Vietnam, iced green tea (“trà đá”) is a popular and inexpensive drink served at street stalls and restaurants. It is commonly offered free of charge with meals. Tea is also an important social beverage, served to guests at home and during family gatherings. Regional differences exist: in the North, people prefer strong green tea (“trà mạn”), while in the South, lighter tea and iced tea are more common. The tea culture within Vietnam is ancient and is home to some of the oldest living tea plants. Before French colonisation, tea was primarily produced for personal and local-market consumption. The first tea plantation was established in 1890 within the Phu Tho province and was very successful. During the twentieth century, Vietnam saw a surge in tea production and began exporting tea worldwide. As of 2015, a study conducted by the United Nations concluded that Vietnam was the world's fifth-largest exporter of tea. In the same year, it was estimated that 80% of the total yield was dedicated to foreign markets.

The word in the Vietnamese language is trà (pronounced [t͡ɕaː˨˩] or [ʈaː˨˩]) or chè (pronounced [t͡ɕɛ˨˩] or [cɛ˨˩]). It is served unsweetened and unaccompanied by milk, cream, or lemon.

Traditionally, tea is frequently consumed as green tea (trà xanh). Variants of black tea (trà đen) are also widely used, although frequently scented with Jasminum sambac blossoms (chè nhài, trà lài). Huế is renowned for its tea scented with Nelumbo nucifera stamens (trà sen).

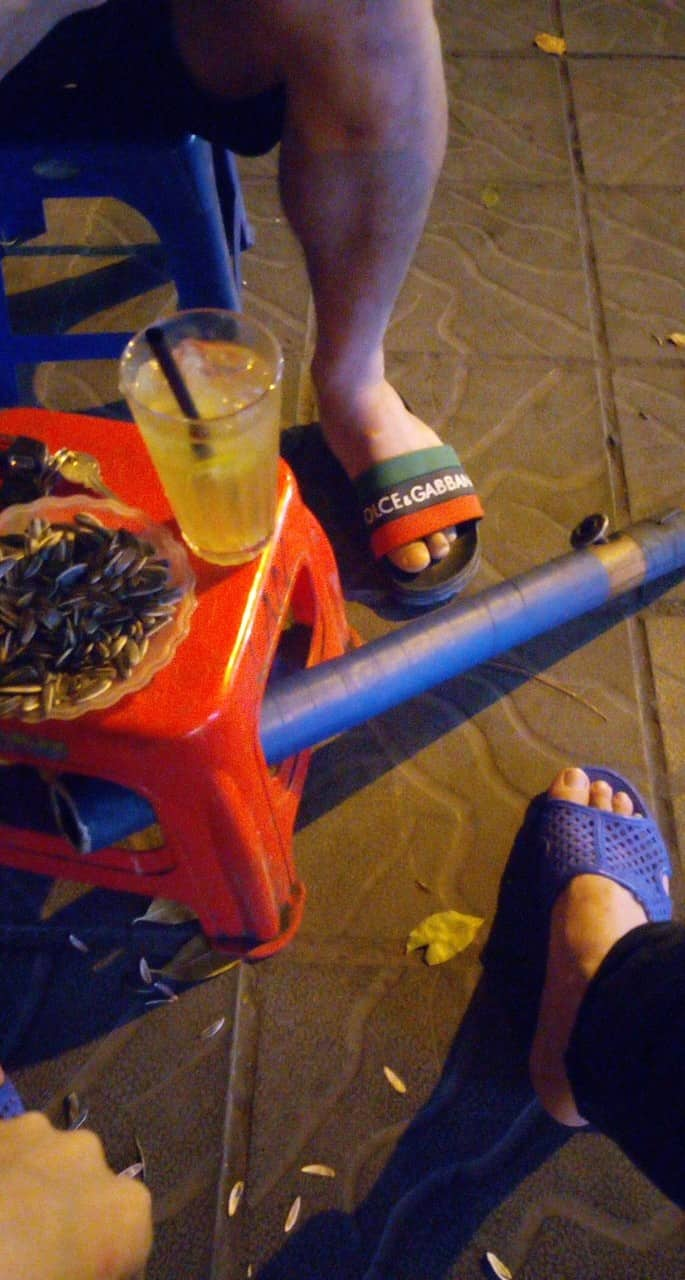
Iced tea at a beverage shop

In Vietnamese restaurants, including eateries overseas, a complimentary pot of tea is usually served once the meal has been ordered, with refills free of charge.

== Central Asia ==
Tea was transported to Central Asia through the Silk Road.

=== Kazakhstan ===
In 2020, Kazakhstan had the highest annual per capita tea consumption in the Commonwealth of Independent States (CIS), at 1.5 kilograms. In Kazakhstan, tea is traditionally consumed black with milk.

In Kazakh culture, welcoming guests involves a traditional practice known as syi-ayak. This ritual begins with handwashing and serves black tea, sometimes with lemon, milk, fennel, or cardamom, in a ceramic bowl called a Piyala. The family's head, usually the husband, receives the tea first, followed by the guests. After the meal, it's customary for everyone to stay seated until the last person finishes their tea before leaving together.

=== Kyrgyzstan ===
In Kyrgyzstan, tea is so widely consumed that it is considered bad luck to drink cold water.

=== Tajikistan ===
The national drink of Tajikistan is green tea, and tea often accompanies every meal.

=== Turkmenistan ===
Traditional weddings in Tajikistan involve the couple drinking from the same cup of tea as part of officiating their marriage.

=== Uzbekistan ===
In Uzbekistan, traditional tea is green and it is called kuk choy.

== South Asia ==
=== Afghanistan ===
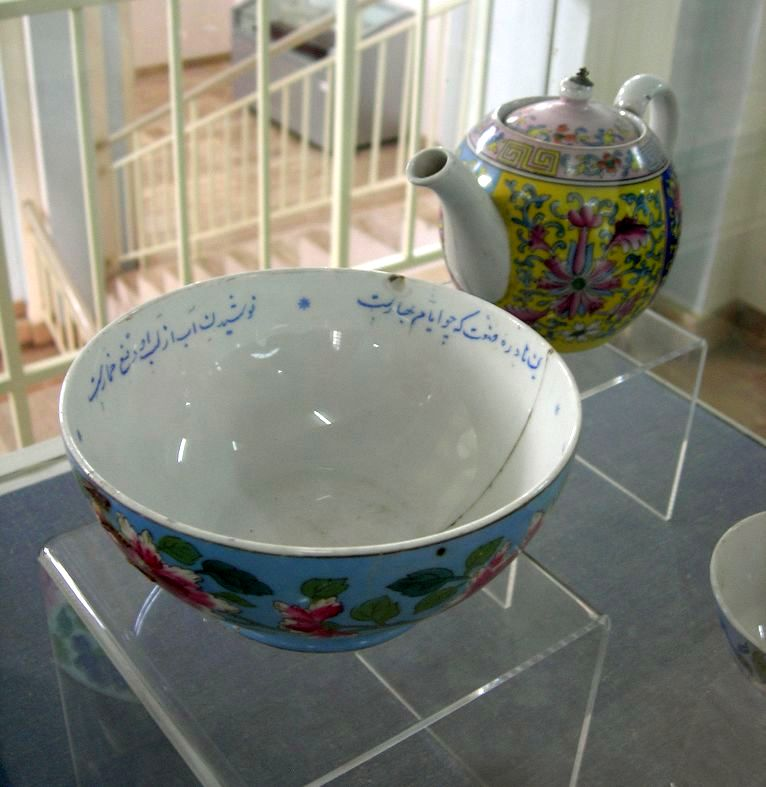
Afghan teapot and plate

Tea is the unofficial national drink of Afghanistan, where it is widely consumed and offered to visitors. Both green and black tea are used (although green is preferred), and cardamom, saffron or blocks of sugar are often added, but normally without milk. Teahouses are common, which are locally called chai-khana.

=== Bangladesh ===
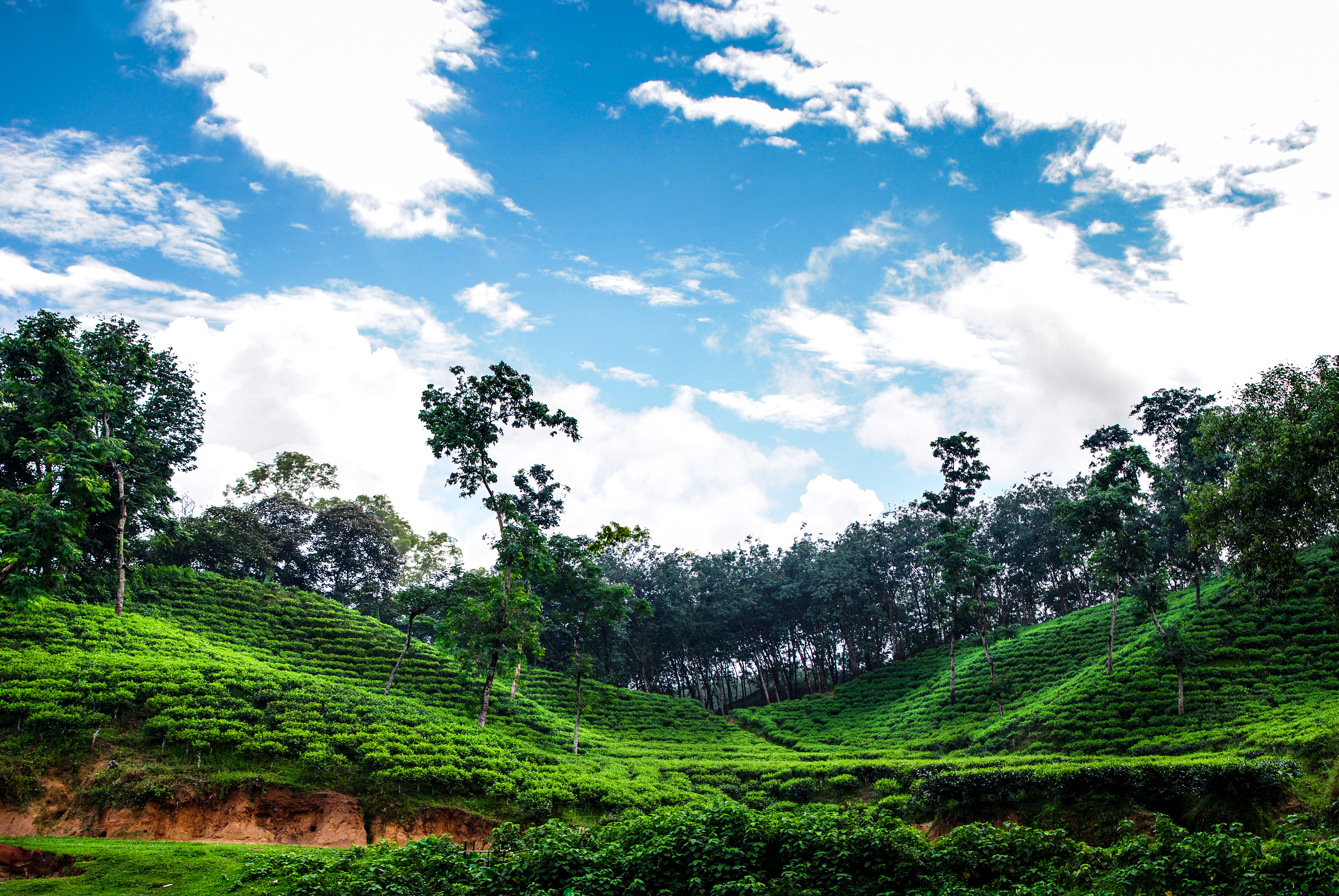
Tea plantation, Sylhet District, Bangladesh

The habit of drinking tea in Bangladesh was started by the British during the British colonial period. The first Tea garden in Bangladesh was established in 1849 at Malnicherra, Sylhet district. Since then, tea has become a popular beverage among the Bangladeshis. In 2021, about 96.50 million kilograms (kgs) of the plant were produced by 167 farms across Bangladesh and almost 75% of them are consumed within the country. Teas are primarily served here to guests and usually drunk at breakfast and snack during any time of the day. The Bangladeshi tea culture has developed around the tea stalls, which are the social gathering centres in the villages and communities. Different variants of tea such as Milk tea, Black tea, Malai chai, Lemon tea, and Seven Color Tea from Srimangal are highly popular in Bangladesh.

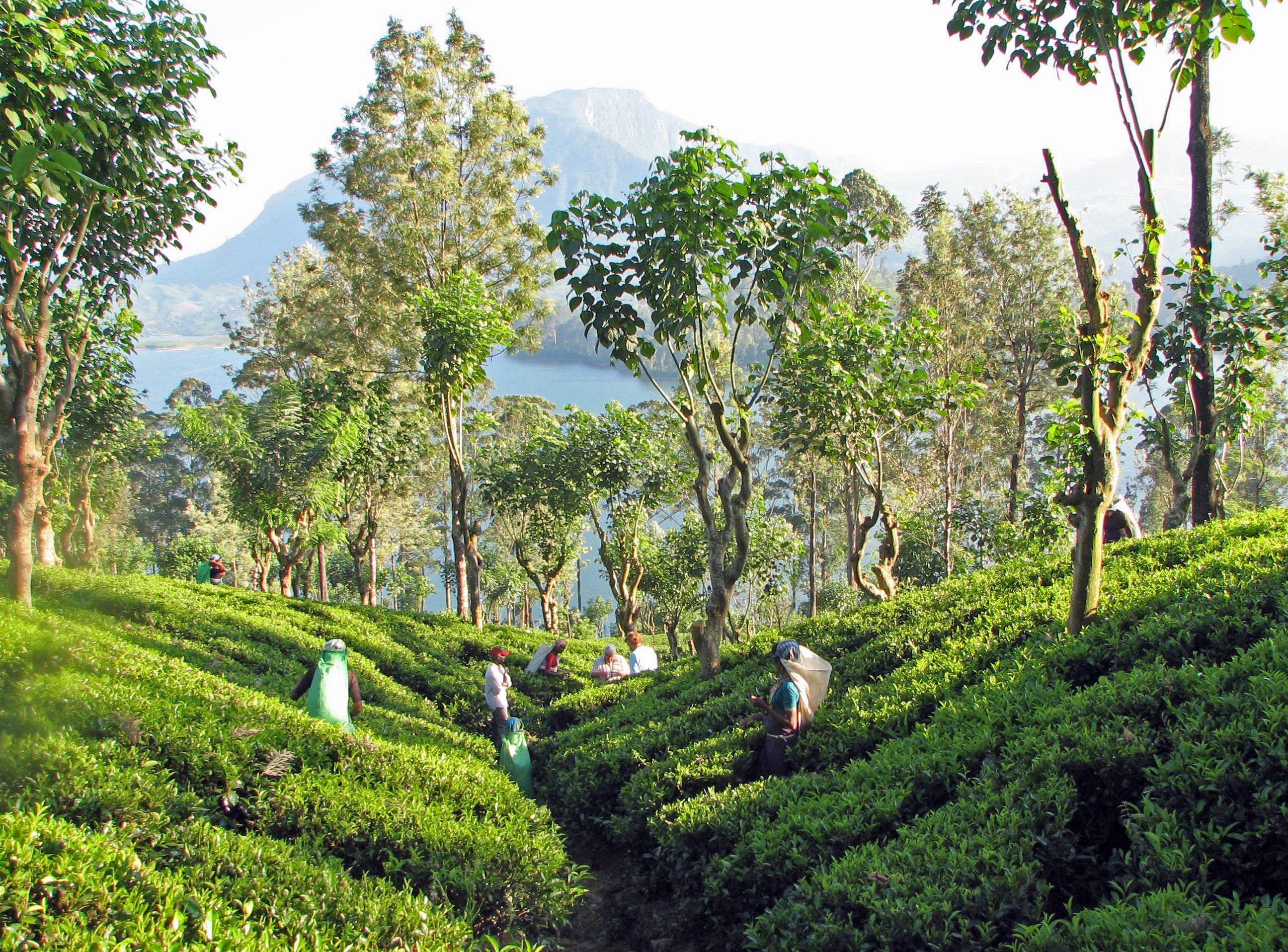
Tea plantation, Sri Lanka

=== India ===
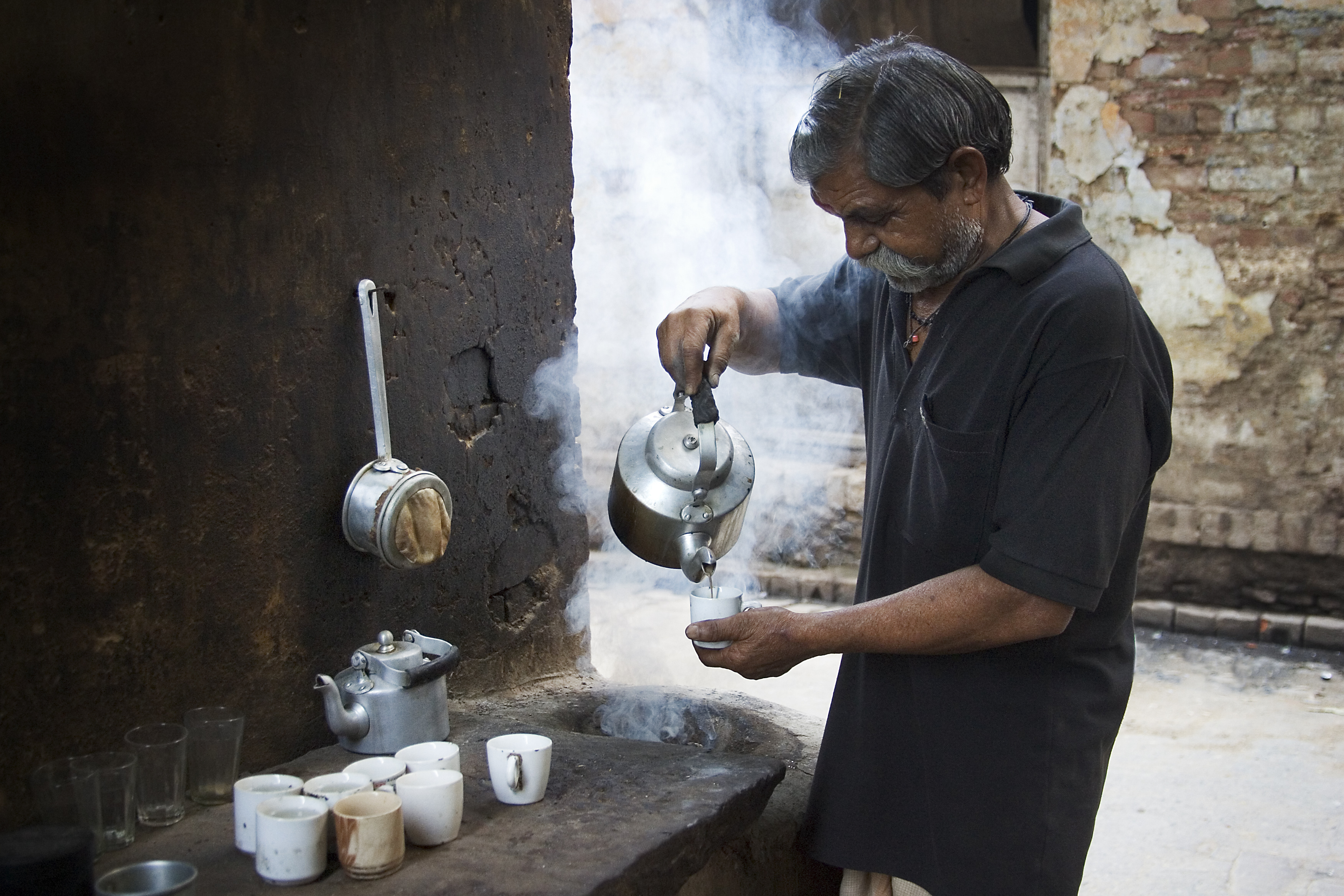
A chai wallah in Varanasi India pours a cup of tea

One of the world's largest tea producers, India is a country where tea is popular as a breakfast and evening drink. It is often served as masala chai with milk, sugar, and spices such as ginger, cardamom, black pepper, and cinnamon. Almost all the tea consumed is black Indian tea, CTC variety. Usually, tea leaves are boiled in the water while making tea, and milk is added.

Offering tea to visitors is the cultural norm in Indian homes, offices, and places of business. Tea is often consumed at small roadside stands, prepared by tea makers known as chai wallahs.

There are three most famous regions in India to produce black teas: Darjeeling, Assam, and Nilgiri. "Strong, heavy, and fragrant" are three criteria for judging black tea. Darjeeling tea is known for its delicate aroma and light colour and is aptly termed "the champagne of teas," which has a high aroma and yellow or brown liquid after brewing. Assam tea is known for its robust taste and dark colour, and Nilgiri tea is dark, intensely aromatic, and flavorful. Assam produces the largest quantity of tea in India, mostly of the CTC variety, and is one of the biggest suppliers of major international brands such as Lipton and Tetley. The Tetley brand, formerly British-owned and one of the largest, is now owned by the Indian Tata Tea Limited company.

On April 21, 2012, the Deputy Chairman of Planning Commission (India), Montek Singh Ahluwalia, said that tea would be declared a national drink by April 2013. Speaking on the occasion, former Assam Chief Minister Tarun Gogoi said a special package for the tea industry would be announced in the future to ensure its development. The move was expected to boost the tea industry in the country, but in May 2013 the ministry of commerce decided not to declare a national drink for fear of disrupting the competing coffee industry.

=== Pakistan ===
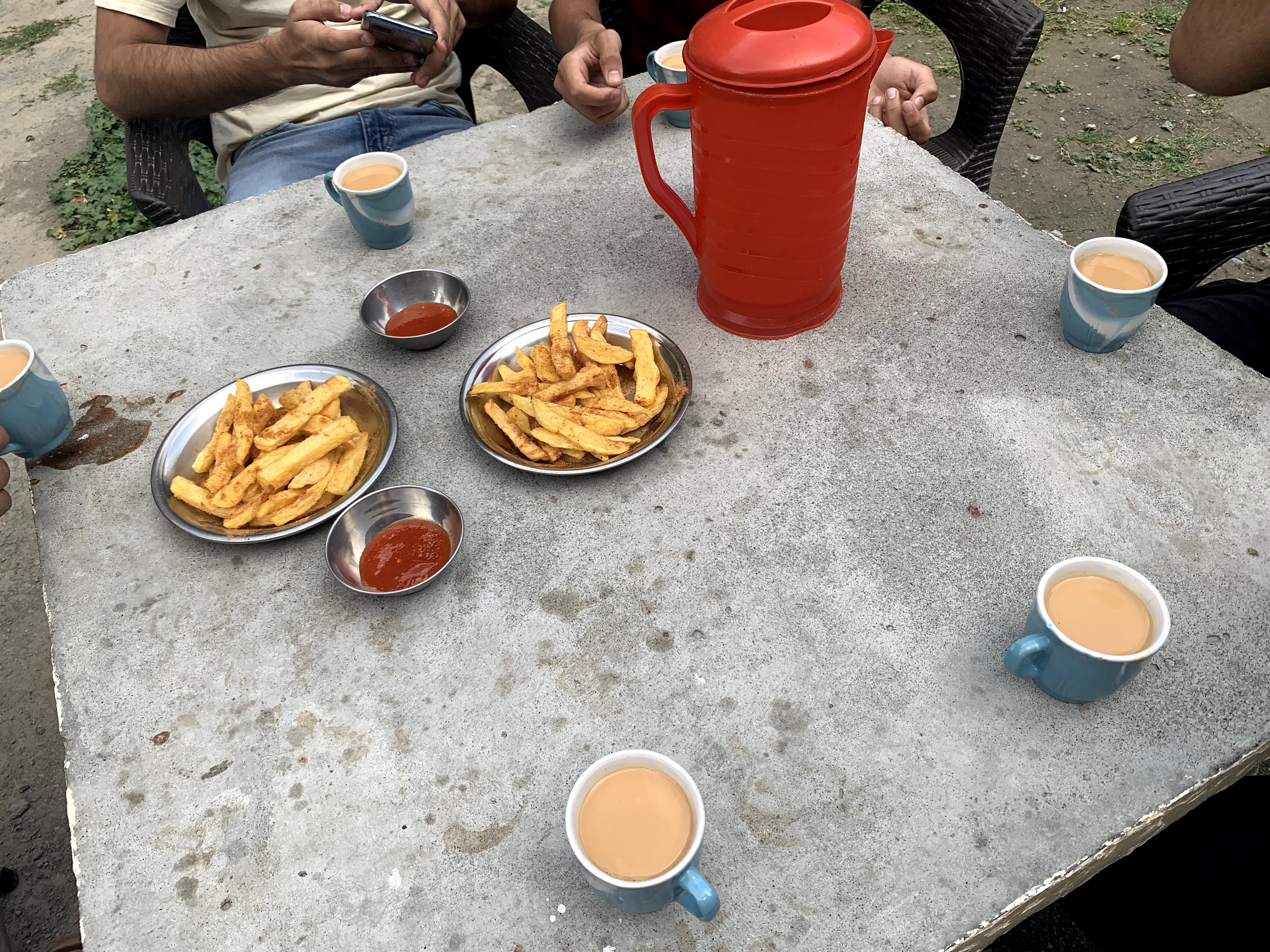
Tea is mostly taken with sweets (biscuits) or snacks (such as samosas or French fries) in Pakistan.

Tea is popular all over Pakistan and is referred to as chai (چائے). During British rule, tea became very popular in Lahore. Tea is usually consumed at breakfast, during lunch breaks at the workplace, and in the evening at home. Evening tea may be consumed with biscuits or cake. Guests are typically offered a choice between tea and soft drinks. It is common practise for homeowners to offer tea breaks to hired labourers and sometimes even provide them with tea during the breaks. The tea offered to labour is typically strong and has more sugar.

In Pakistan, both black and green teas are popular and are known locally as sabz chai and kahwah, respectively. The popular green tea called kahwah is often served after every meal in Khyber Pakhtunkhwa and the Pashtun belt of Balochistan. In Lahore and other cities of Punjab, Kashmiri chai or cha is common, brought by ethnic Kashmiris in the 19th century. Traditionally, it is prepared with Himalayan rock salt, giving it its characteristic pink colour. It is taken with Bakar khani and Kashmiri kulcha (namkeen/salty version of Khand kulcha). Namkeen chai, or noon/loon chai, commonly called Kashmiri chai, and sometimes sheer (milk) cha or sabz chai (green tea, as the same tea is used for making khahwa/green tea) are sold and seen in Gawalmandi kiosks with salt for Kashmiri as well as sugar and pistachios for non-Kashmiris. In the northern Pakistani regions of Chitral and Gilgit-Baltistan, a salty, buttered Tibetan-style tea is consumed.

=== Sri Lanka ===
In Sri Lanka, black tea is usually served with milk and sugar, but the milk is always warmed. Tea is a hugely popular beverage among the Sri Lankan people, and part of its land is surrounded by the many hills of tea plantations that spread for miles. Drinking tea has become part of the culture of Sri Lanka, and it is customary to offer a cup of tea to guests. Many working Sri Lankans are used to having a mid-morning cup of tea and another in the afternoon. Black tea is sometimes consumed with ginger. In rural areas, some people still have tea with a piece of sweet jaggery.

== West Asia ==
=== Iran ===
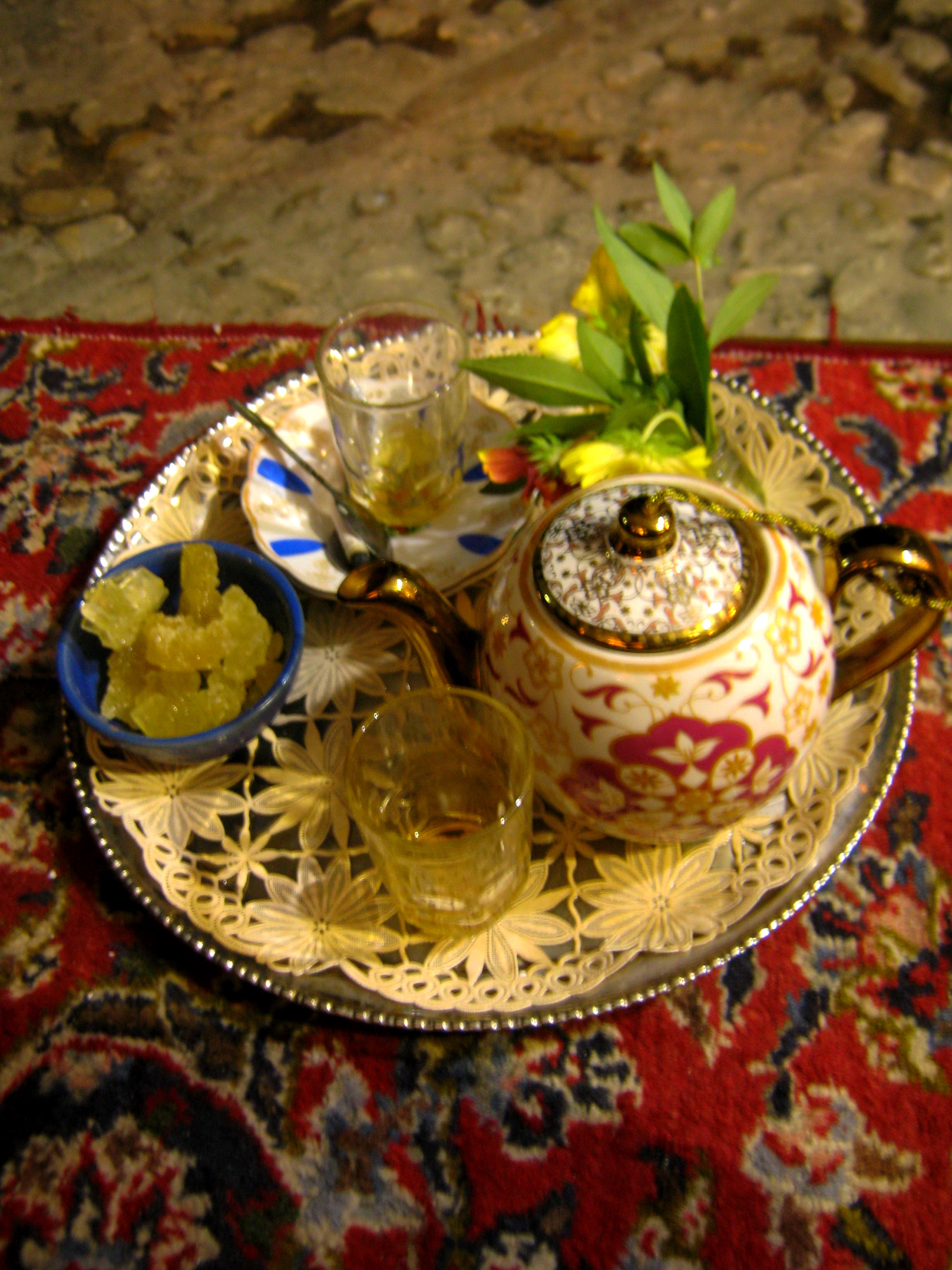
A tea tray served near the Garden of Mausoleum of Omar Khayyam in Nishapur, Iran

Tea found its way to Greater Persia through the Silk Road from India and soon became the national drink. The whole part of northern Iran along the shores of the Caspian Sea is suitable for the cultivation of tea. Especially in Gilan province on the slopes of Alborz, large areas are under tea cultivation, and millions of people work in the tea industry. That region covers a large part of Iran's need for tea. Iranians have one of the highest per capita rates of tea consumption in the world, and since old times, every street has had a chāykhāne (Persian: چایخانه) or teahouse. Chāykhānes are still an important social place. Iranians traditionally drink tea by pouring it into a saucer and putting a lump of rock sugar (نبات nabāt) in the mouth before drinking the tea.

=== Turkey ===
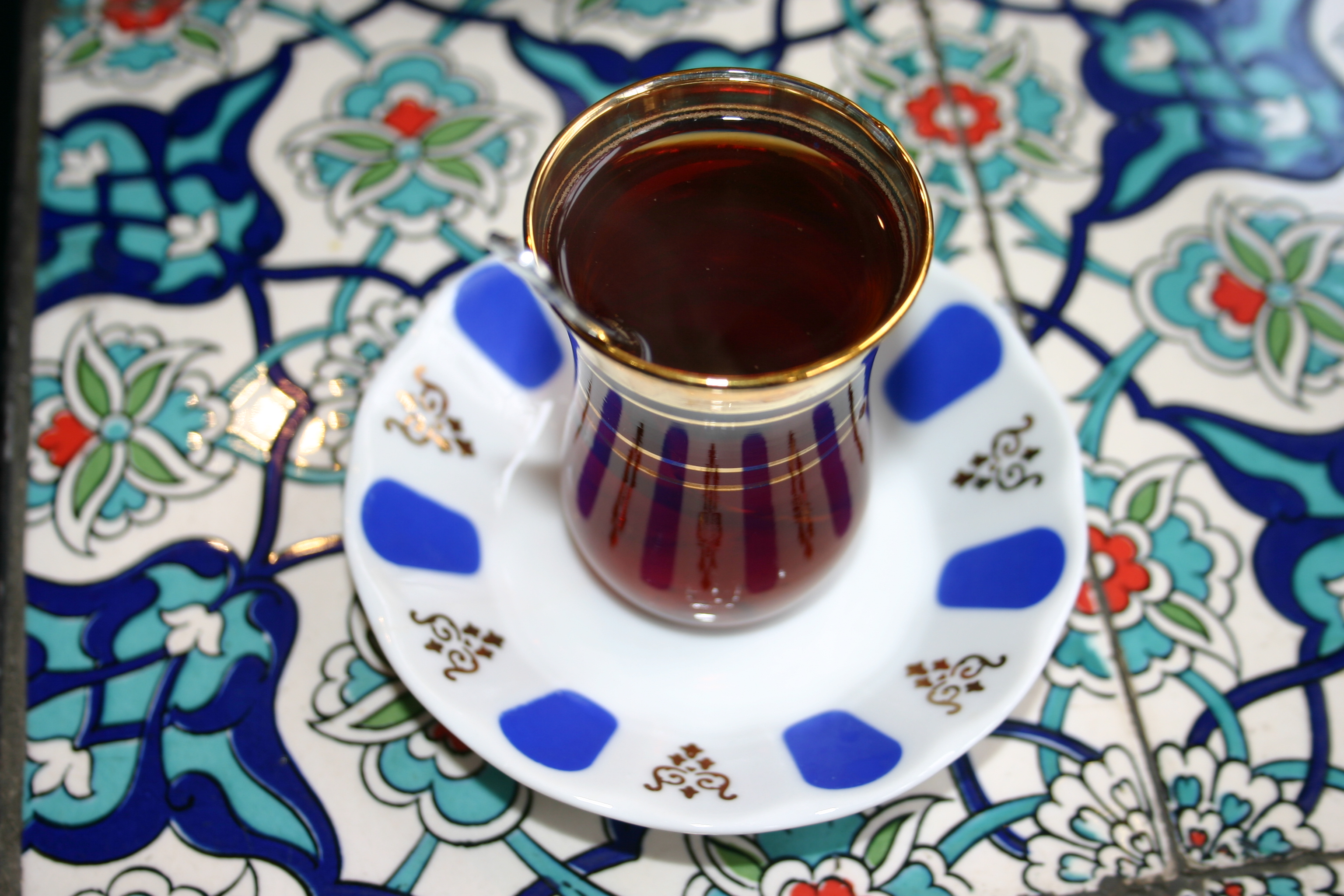
Turkish tea, served in a typical glass

As of 2016, Turkey tops the per capita tea consumption statistics at 3.16 kg (6.96 pounds).

Turkish tea or Çay is produced on the eastern Black Sea coast, which has a mild climate with high precipitation and fertile soil. Turkish tea is typically prepared using çaydanlık, an instrument especially designed for tea preparation, essentially an on-top-of-the-kitchen-range replacement for the more traditional samovar. Water is brought to a boil in the larger lower kettle, and then some of the water is used to fill the smaller kettle on top - demlik - and steep several spoons of loose tea leaves, producing a strong tea. When served, the continually cooking water from the bottom part is used to dilute the strong tea from the top part on a per-cup basis, giving each serving the choice between strong ("koyu"/dark) or weak ("açık"/light). Tea is drunk from small glasses to preserve heat and to display its colour, with lumps of beetroot sugar, either dissolved in the cup for sweetness or pressed between the tongue tip and upper palate for reduced sugar intake (kırtlama). To a lesser extent than in other Muslim countries, tea replaces both alcohol and coffee as the social beverage. Within Turkey, tea is usually known as Rize tea because most of the Turkish tea is produced in Rize Province on the Black Sea coast.

In 2004, Turkey produced 205,500 tonnes of tea (6.4% of the world's total tea production), which made it one of the largest tea markets in the world, with 120,000 tons being consumed in Turkey, and the rest being exported. In 2010 Turkey had the highest per capita consumption in the world at 2.7 kg (6.0 lb). As of 2013, the per-capita consumption of Turkish tea exceeds 10 cups per day and 13.8 kg (30 lb) per year.

== Africa ==
=== Algeria ===
Maghrebi mint tea is central to social life in the Maghreb and is very popular among the Tuareg people of Algeria, Libya, Niger, and Mali. The service can be ceremonial, especially when prepared for a guest. The tea is traditionally made by the head male in the family and offered to guests as a sign of hospitality. Typically, at least three glasses of tea are served. Tea is consumed throughout the day as a social activity.

=== Egypt ===
Tea is the national drink in Egypt. In Egypt, tea is called "shai". Tea packed and sold in Egypt is almost exclusively imported from Kenya and Sri Lanka. The Egyptian government considers tea a strategic crop and runs large tea plantations in Kenya. Green tea is a recent arrival to Egypt (only in the late 1990s did green tea become affordable) and is not as popular.

Egyptian tea comes in two varieties: Koshary and Saiidi. Koshary tea, popular in Lower (Northern) Egypt, is prepared using the traditional method of steeping black tea in boiled water and letting it set for a few minutes. It is almost always sweetened with cane sugar and is often flavored with fresh mint leaves. Adding milk is also common. Koshary tea is usually light, with less than a half teaspoonful per cup considered to be near the high end.

Saiidi tea is typical in Upper (Southern) Egypt. It is prepared by boiling black tea with water for 5 minutes over an intense flame. Saiidi tea is extremely strong, with two teaspoonfuls per cup being the norm. It is sweetened with copious amounts of cane sugar (a necessity since the formula and method yield a very bitter tea). Saiidi tea is often black, even in liquid form.

Besides true tea, herbal teas (or tisanes) are often served at the Egyptian teahouses, with ingredients ranging from mint to cinnamon and ginger to salep; many of these are ascribed medicinal qualities or health benefits in Egyptian folk medicine. Karkade, a tisane of hibiscus flowers, is a particularly popular beverage and is traditionally considered beneficial for the heart.

=== Libya ===
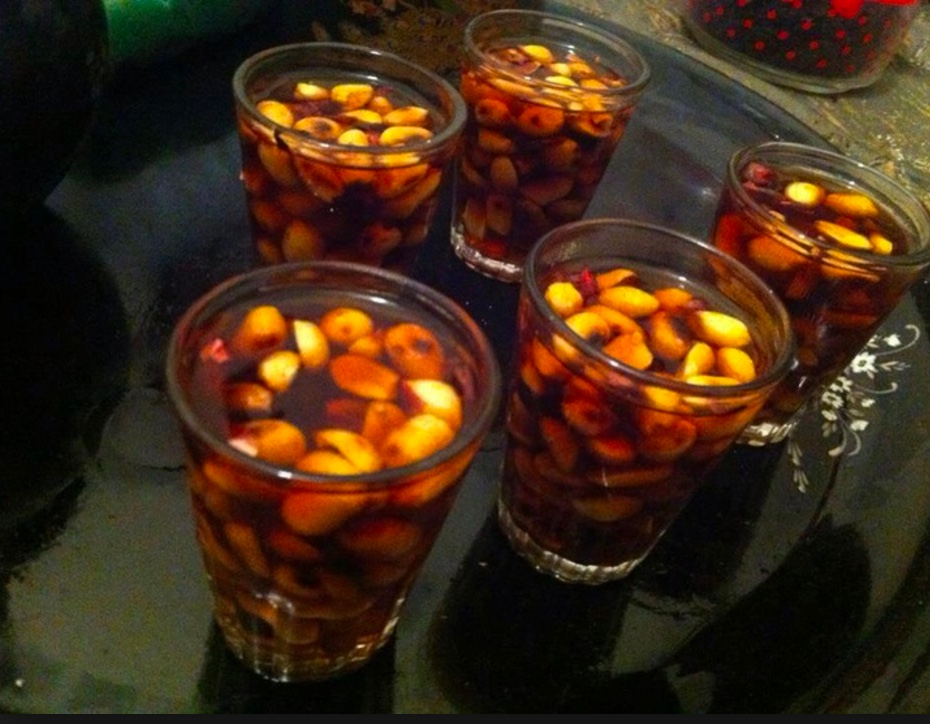
Libyan tea and peanuts

Libyan tea is a strong black or green beverage served in small glass cups with foam or froth topping the glass. It is usually sweetened with sugar and traditionally served in three rounds. Mint or basil is used for flavouring; traditionally, the last round is served with boiled peanuts or almonds.

=== Mauritius ===
Tea plays an integral part in the culture of Mauritius. Tea drinking allows for socialising and is commonly served to guests and in the workplace.

The Mauritian people usually consume black tea, often with milk and sugar. Mauritius is a tea producer, initially on a small scale when the French introduced the plant to the island around 1765. It was under later British rule that the scale of tea cultivation increased.

Three major tea producers dominate the local market: Bois Cheri, Chartreuse, and Corson. The signature product is vanilla-flavoured tea, commonly bought and consumed on the island.

=== Morocco ===
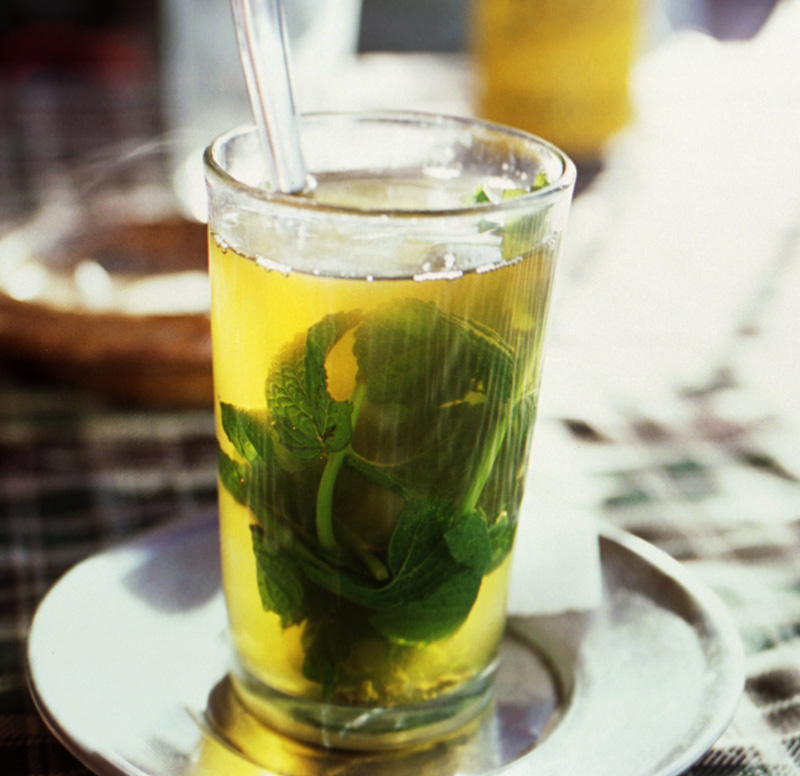
Moroccan mint tea

Morocco is considered the largest importer of green tea worldwide.

Morocco consumes green tea with mint rather than black tea. It has become part of the culture and is used widely at almost every meal. The Moroccan people even make tea performances a unique culture in the flower country. Moroccan tea is commonly served with rich tea cookies, fresh green mint leaves, local "finger-shaped" brown sugar, and colourful tea glasses and pots.

=== Sahel ===
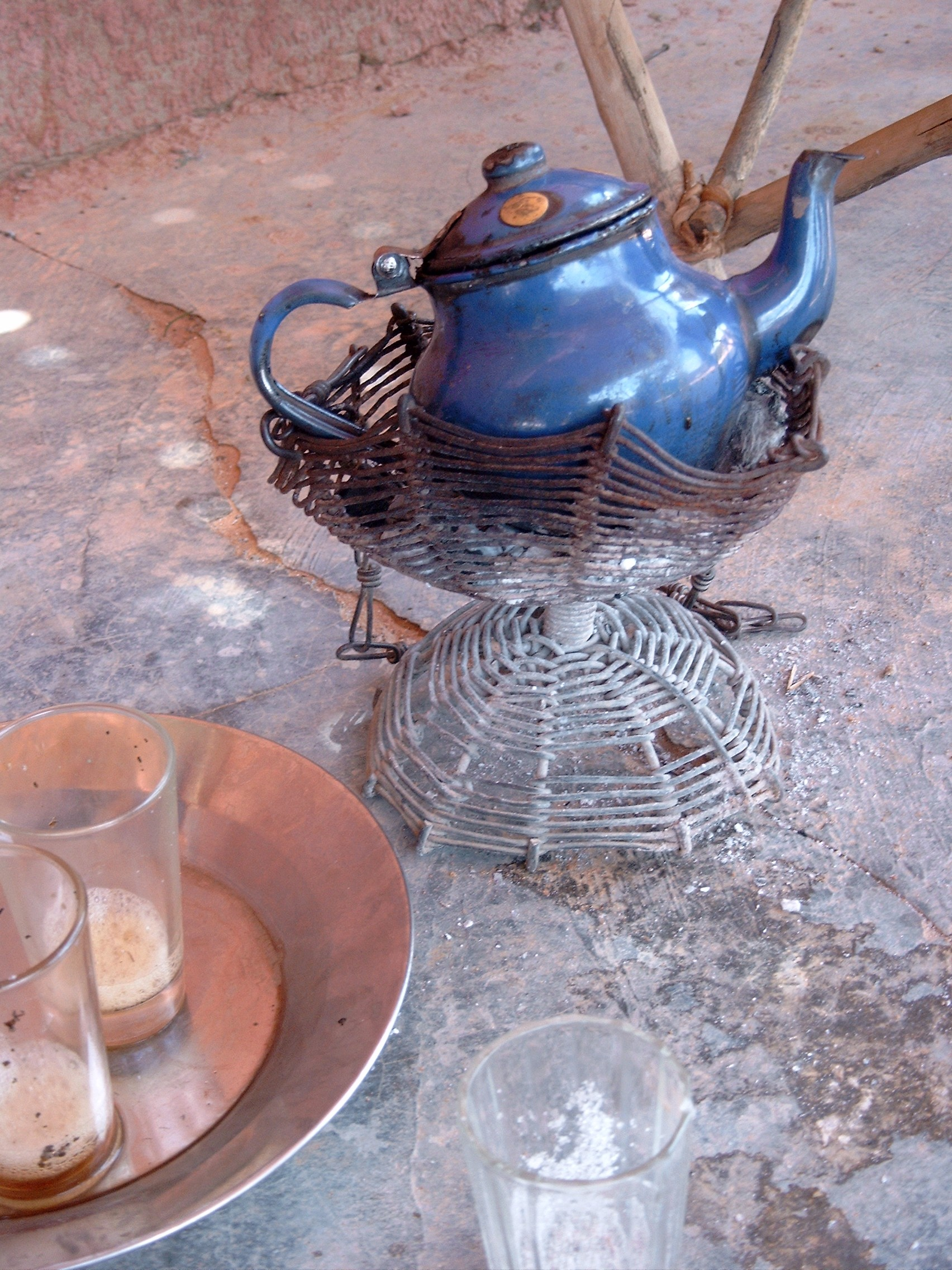
Sahelian tea set

In the Sahel region on the southern fringe of the Sahara (such as in Mali, Niger, and Algeria), green gunpowder tea is prepared with little water and large amounts of sugar. By pouring the tea into the glasses and back, foam builds on the tea. Sahelian tea is a social occasion and has three infusions: the first is very bitter ("bitter as death"), the second is in between ("flavorful as life"), and the last is rather sweet ("sweet as love"), which are taken over several hours. Drinking tea is a social activity that is accompanied by conversation and storytelling.

== Europe ==
=== France ===
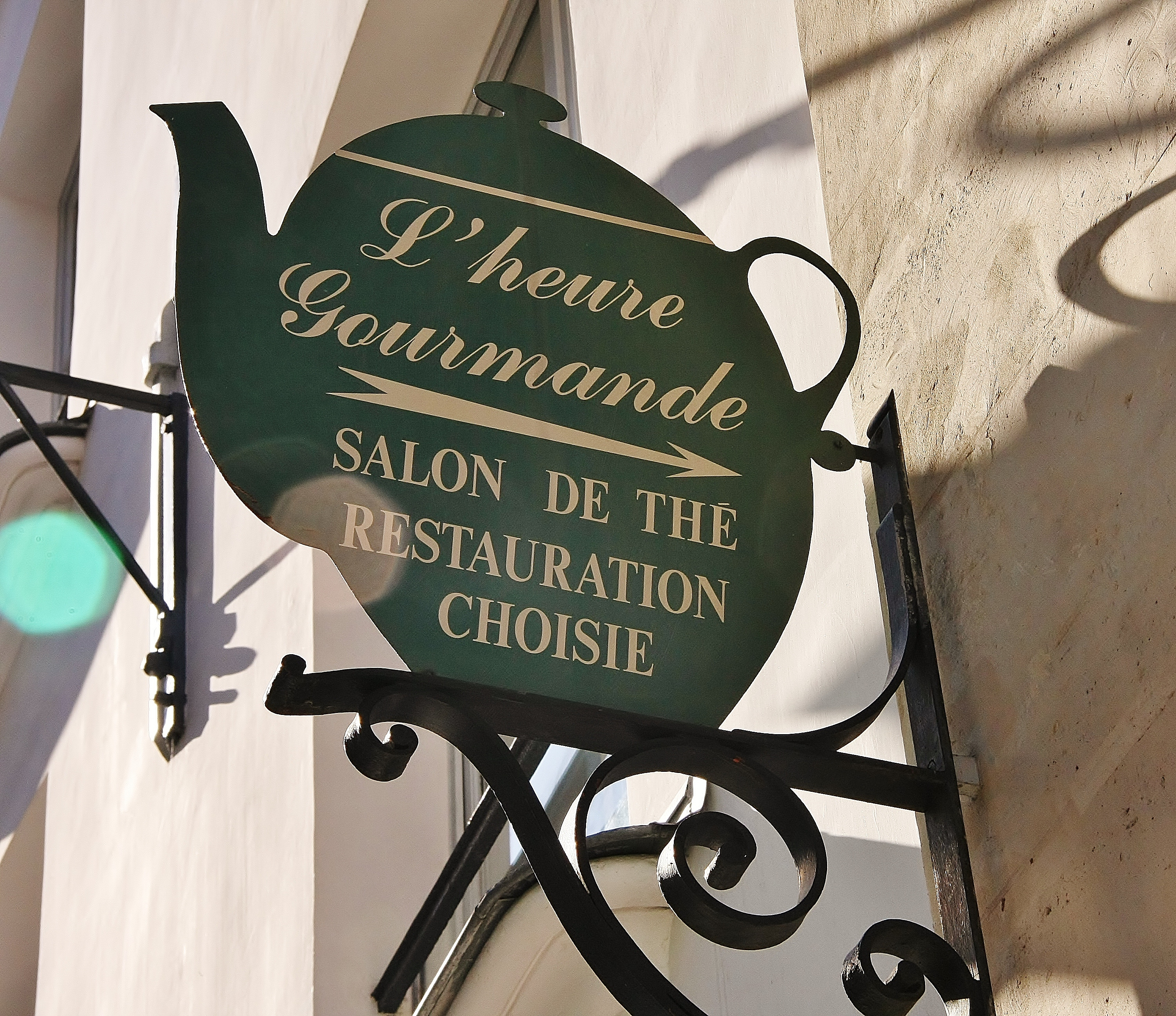
A sign for a salon de thé in the shape of a teapot in Paris

While France is well known for its coffee drinking, afternoon tea has long been a social habit of the upper-middle class. Mariage Frères is a famous high-end tea shop from Paris, active since 1854. The French tea market is still only a fraction of the British one (a consumption of 250 g or 8.8 oz per person a year compared to about 2 kg or 4.4 lb in the UK), but it has doubled from 1995 to 2005 and is growing steadily. Tea in France is of the black variety, but Asian green teas and fruit-flavoured teas are becoming increasingly popular. French people generally drink tea in the afternoon. It is often taken in salons de thé. Tea is usually served with some pastries, both sweet and pastries made especially for tea.

=== Germany ===
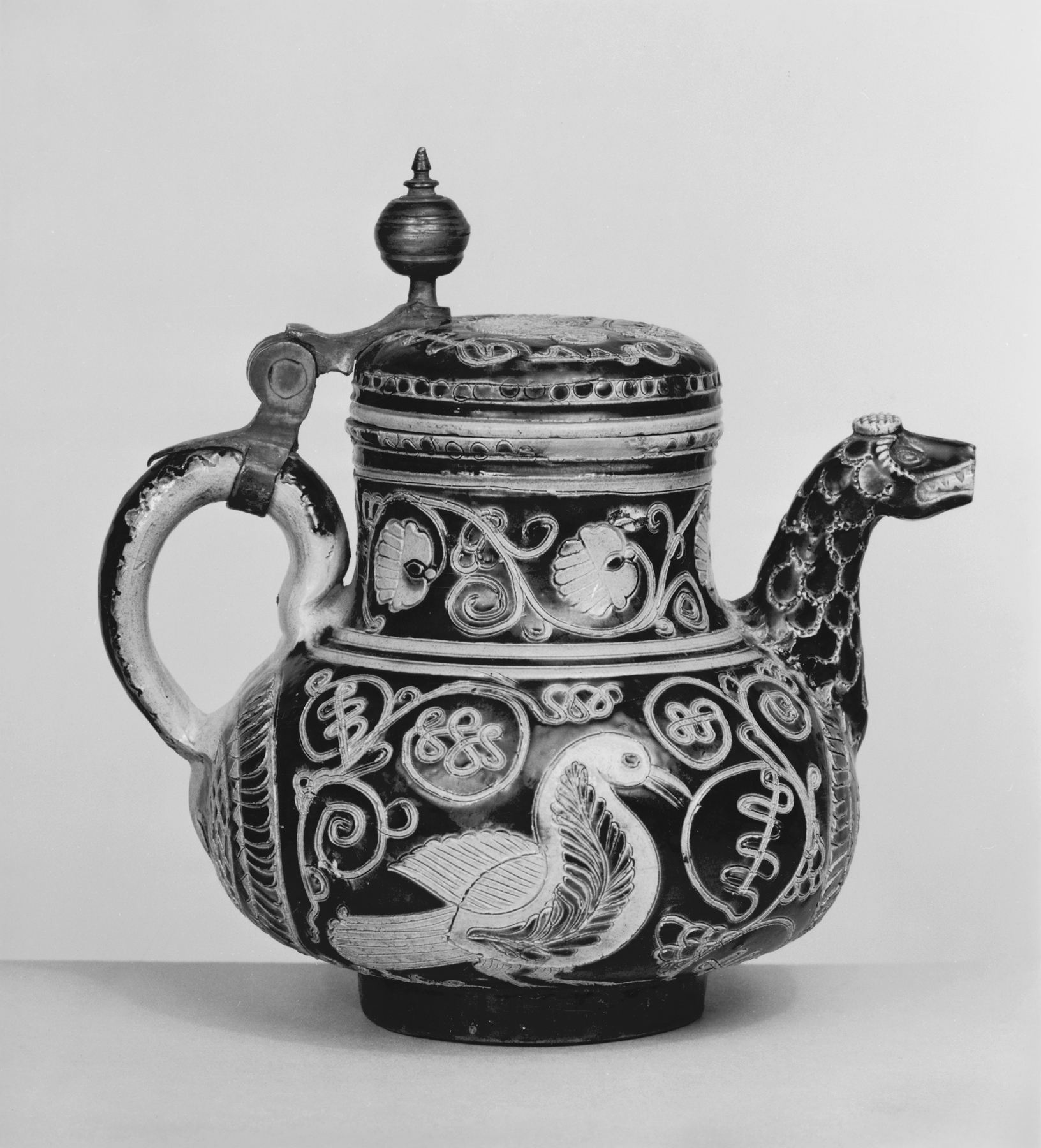
A German teapot with a hinged lid, 18th century

While coffee remains more popular than tea in Germany, the region of East Frisia is noted for its consumption of tea and its tea culture. Nearly 75 percent of all tea imported to Germany is consumed in this region.

Intense blends of Assam tea, Ceylon, and Darjeeling (East-Frisian Blend) are served whenever there are visitors to an East-Frisian home or other gatherings, as well as with breakfast, mid-afternoon, and mid-evening. The traditional preparation is as follows: Kluntje, a white rock candy sugar that melts slowly, is added to the empty cup (allowing multiple cups to be sweetened), and then the tea is poured over the Kluntje. A heavy cream "cloud" ("Wölkje"—a diminutive of 'cloud' in Frisian) is added to the tea "water", and the sugar represents "land". It is served without a spoon and traditionally drunk unstirred, i.e., in three tiers: In the beginning, one predominantly tastes the cream, then the tea, and finally the sweet taste of kluntje at the bottom of the cup. Stirring the tea would blend all three tiers into one and spoil the traditional tea flavour. The tea is served with small cookies during the week and cakes on special occasions or on weekends as a special treat. Apple strudel and sandthorn cake are particularly popular.

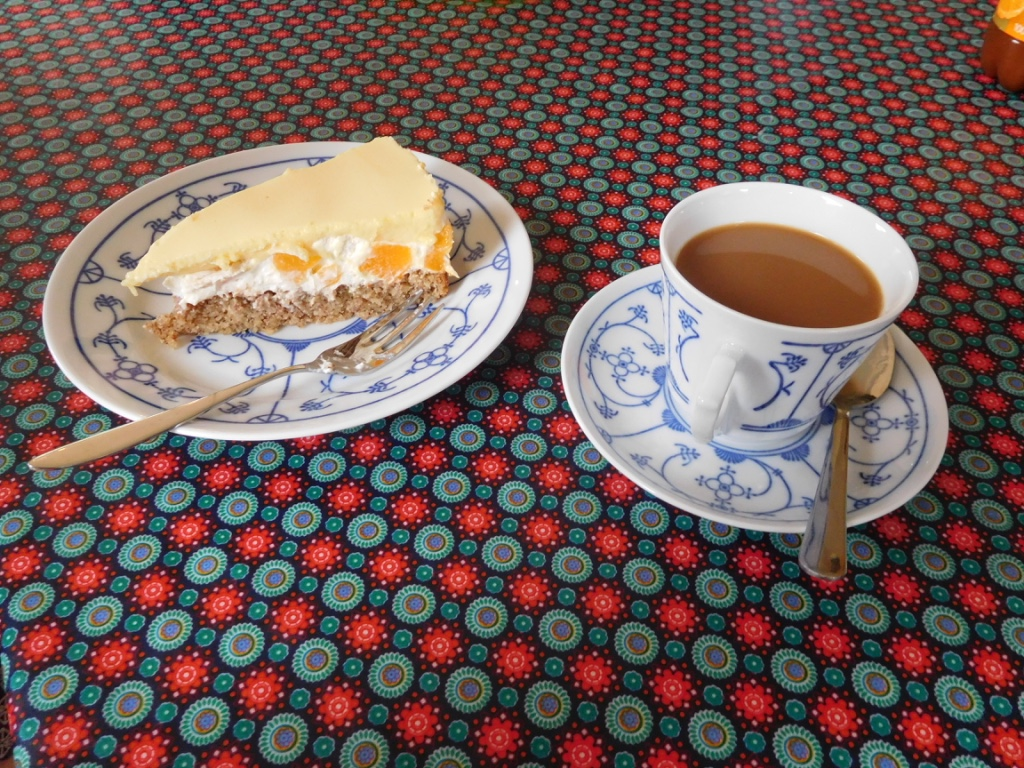
East Frisian tea served in traditional patterned tea service

The tea is said to cure headaches, stomach problems, and stress, among many other ailments. The tea set is commonly decorated with an East Friesian rose design. As a guest, it is considered impolite to drink fewer than three cups of tea. Placing your cup upside down on the saucer or your spoon in the cup signals that you are finished and want no more tea.

=== Ireland ===
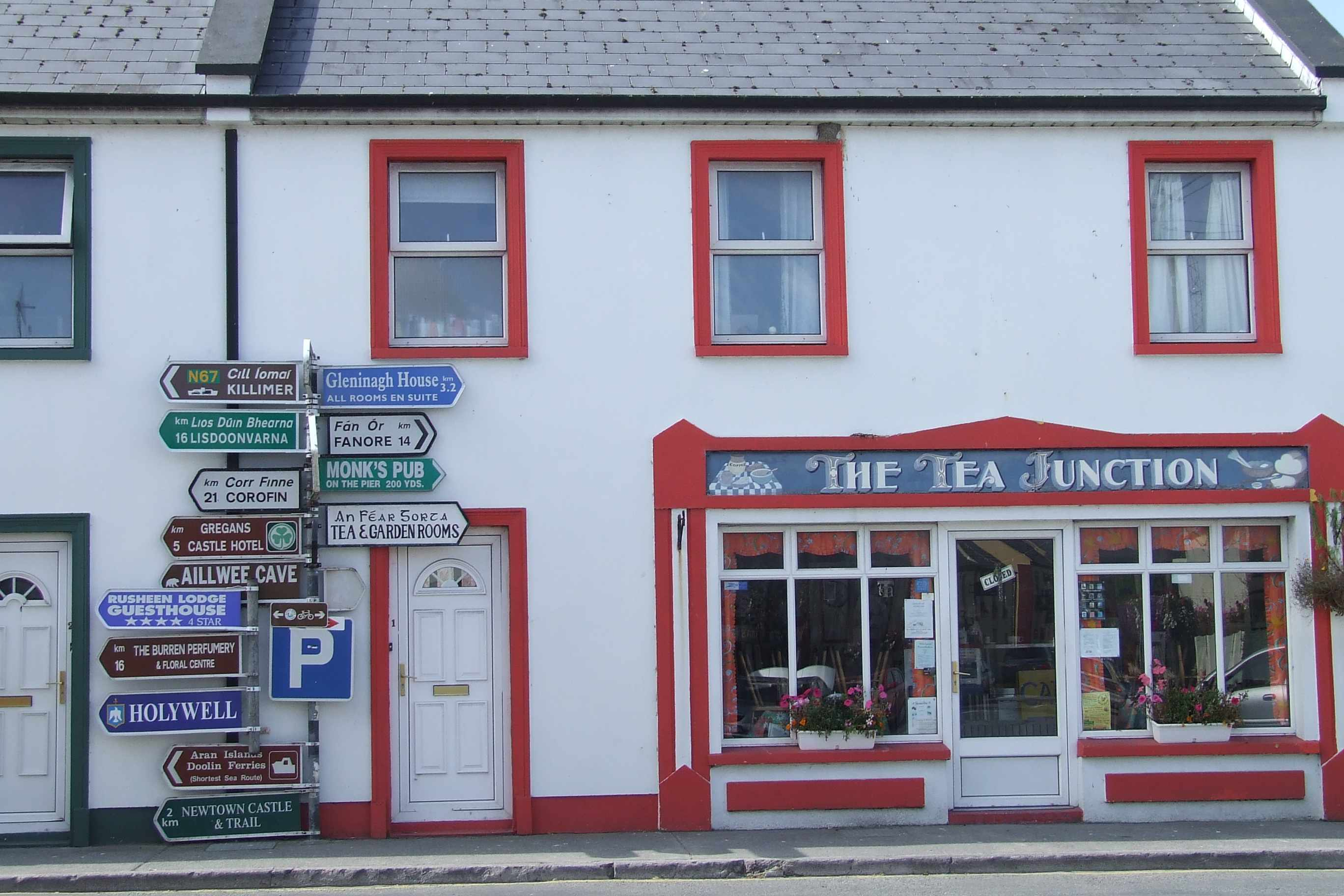
An Irish café, The Tea Junction, in Ballyvaughan, County Clare, Ireland

Ireland is the second-biggest per capita consumer of tea in the world with consumption of 2.19 kg (4.83 pounds) per person per year. Although broadly similar to tea culture in the United Kingdom, Irish tea culture's main distinguishing feature are the slightly spicier and stronger flavours than traditional English blends. Popular brands of tea sold in Ireland are Barry's, Bewley's and Lyons.

=== Portugal ===
Tea growing in Portugal takes place in the Azores, a group of islands located 1,500 km (930 mi) west of Mainland Portugal. Portugal was the first to introduce the practise of drinking tea to Europe and the first European country to produce tea.

In 1750, terrains ranging from the fields of Capelas to those of Porto Formoso on the island of São Miguel were used for the first trial crops of tea, delivering 10 kg (22 lb) of black tea and 8 kg (18 lb) of green tea. A century later, with the introduction of skilled workers from the Macau Region of China in 1883, production became significant, and the culture expanded. Following the instructions of these workers, the species Jasminum grandiflorum and Malva vacciones were introduced to give 'nobility' to the tea aroma, though only the Jasminum was used.

This tea is currently traded under the name of the processed compound, Gorreana, and is produced by independent families. No herbicides or pesticides are allowed in the growing process, and modern consumers associate the production with more recent organic teas. However, production standards concerning the plant and cropping have not changed for the last 250 years.

=== Russia ===
The podstakannik ('подстаканник'), or tea glass holder (literally "thing under the glass"), is a part of Russian tea tradition. A Russian tea glass-holder is a traditional way of serving and drinking tea in Russia, Ukraine, Belarus, and other CIS and ex-USSR countries. Expensive podstakanniks are made from silver, classic series are made mostly from nickel silver, cupronickel, and other alloys with nickel, silver or gold plating. In Russia, it is customary to drink tea brewed separately in a teapot and diluted with freshly boiled water ('pair-of-teapots tea', 'чай парой чайников'). Traditionally, the tea is robust, its strength often indicating the hosts' degree of hospitality. The traditional implement for boiling water for tea used to be the samovar (and sometimes it still is, though usually electric). Tea is a family event and is usually served after each meal with sugar (one to three teaspoonfuls per cup), lemon (but without milk), and an assortment of jams, pastries, and confections. Black tea is commonly used, with green tea gaining popularity as a healthier, more "Oriental" alternative. Teabags are not used in the traditional Russian tea ceremony, only loose, large-leaf black tea.

In Russian prisons, where alcohol and drugs are prohibited, inmates often brew robust tea known as 'chifir' to experience its mood-altering properties.

=== United Kingdom ===
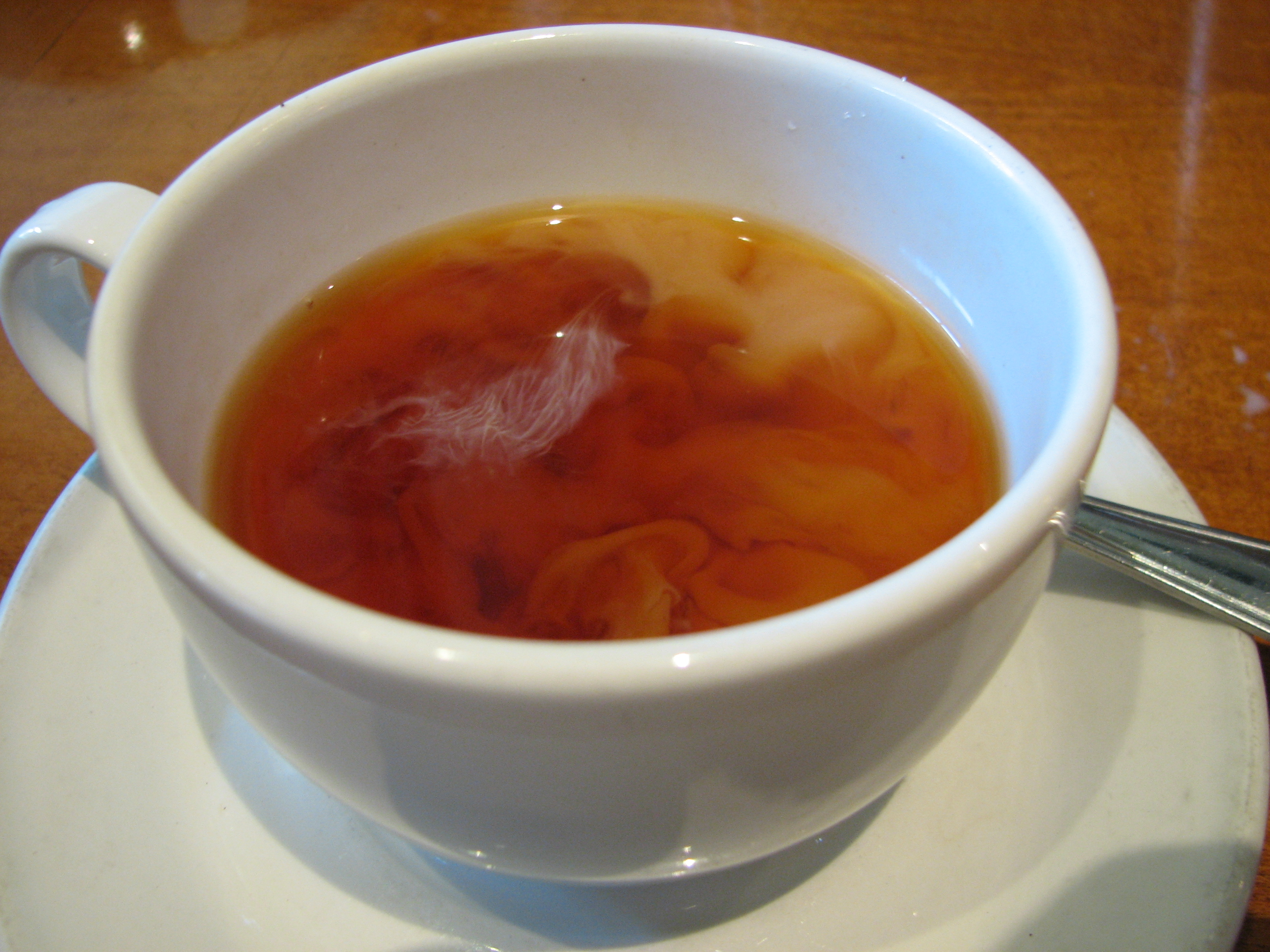
Black tea with just added—and not yet stirred in—milk

The British are the fourth-largest per capita consumers of tea in the world, with each person consuming on average 1.9 kg (4.2 lb) per year. Tea is usually black tea served with milk and often with sugar. Strong tea served with milk and optionally one or more teaspoons of sugar, usually in a mug, is commonly referred to as builder's tea for its association with builders and, more broadly, with the working class. Much of the time in the United Kingdom, tea drinking is not a delicate, refined cultural expression. A mug of tea is something drunk frequently throughout the day. This is not to say that the British do not have a more formal tea ceremony, but tea breaks are an essential part of the working day. The term is often shortened to "tea", indicating a break. This term was exported to the game of cricket and, consequently, to most other countries of the former British Empire.

History

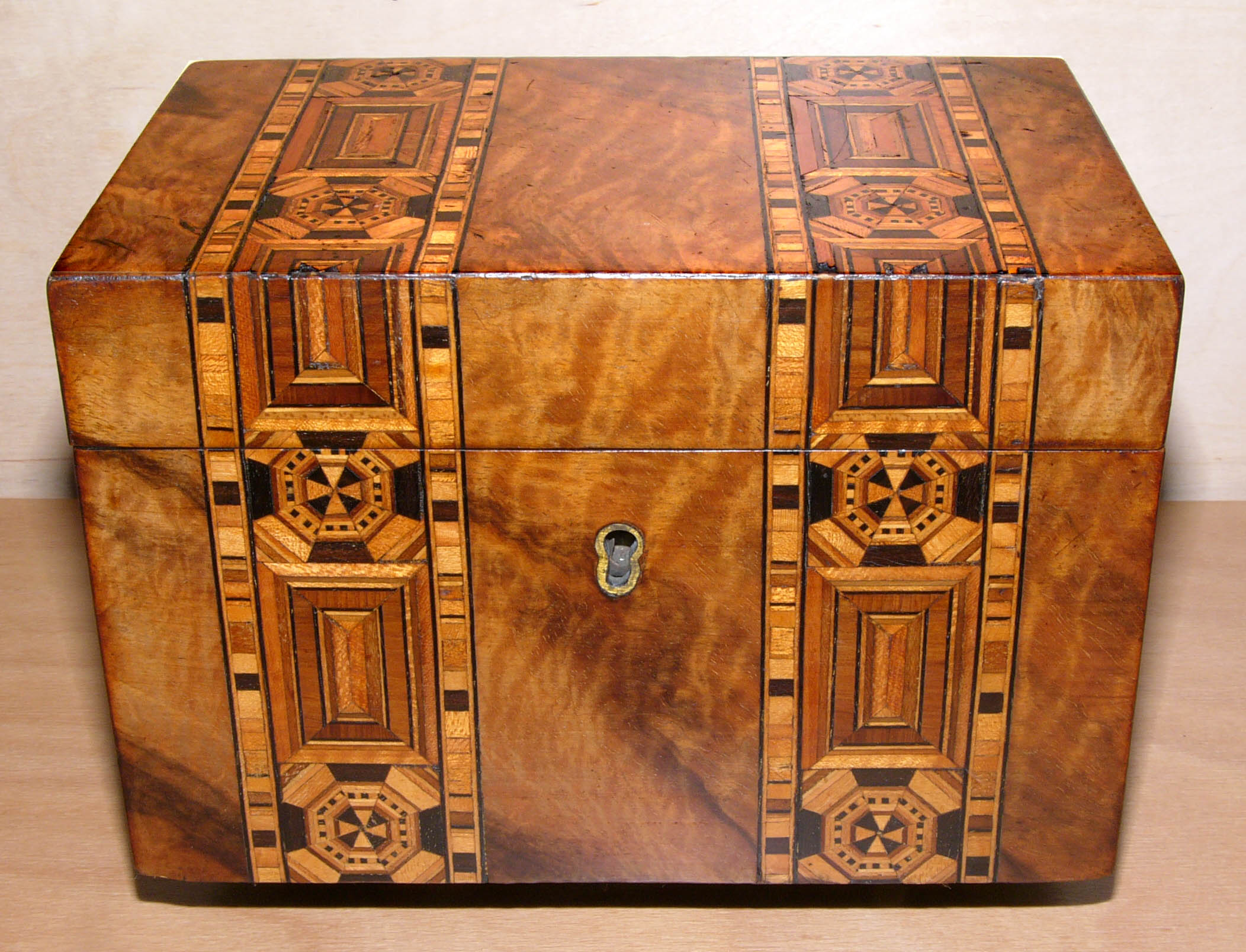
Box for the storage of loose tea leaves known as a tea caddy

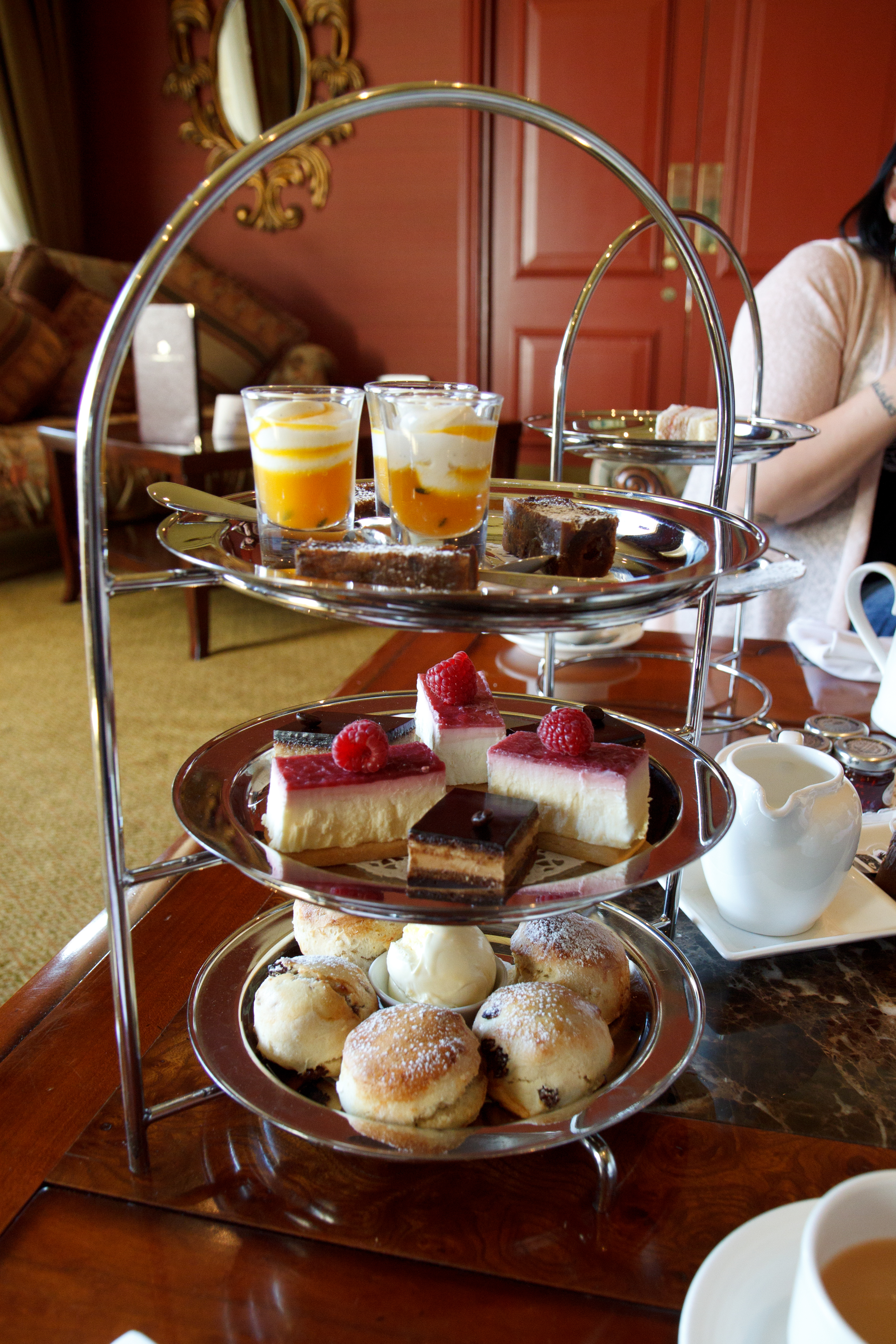
An example of an afternoon tea service from Heddon-on-the-Wall, Northumberland, England

The popularity of tea dates back to the 19th century when India was part of the British Empire, and British interests-controlled tea production in the subcontinent. It was, however, first introduced in the UK by the Portuguese Catherine of Braganza, queen consort of Charles II in the 1660s and 1670s. As tea spread throughout the United Kingdom and through the social classes, tea gardens and tea dances developed. These include watching fireworks or a dinner party and dance, concluding with an evening tea. The tea gardens lost value after World War II, but tea dances are still held today in the UK.

Some scholars suggest that tea played a role in the Industrial Revolution. Afternoon tea possibly became a way to increase the number of hours labourers could work in factories; the stimulants in the tea, accompanied by sugary snacks, would give workers energy to finish out the day's work. Further, tea helped alleviate some of the consequences of the urbanisation that accompanied the industrial revolution: drinking tea required boiling one's water, thereby killing water-borne diseases like dysentery, cholera, and typhoid.

Tea as a meal

In the United Kingdom, tea is not only the beverage's name but also the meal's name. The kind of meal a person means depends significantly on their social background and where they live. The differentiation in usage between dinner, supper, lunch, and tea is one of the classic social markers of British English (see U and non-U English).

Influence in other Commonwealth countries

Afternoon tea and its variants are the best-known "tea ceremony" in the Commonwealth countries, available in homes and commercial establishments. In some varieties of English, "tea" refers to a Savoury meal.

== North America ==
=== Canada ===
In Canada, various types of tea are used by many indigenous tribes as healing and ceremonial medicines. For example, the Ojibwe and Cree tribes in Ontario use cedar tea during sweat lodge ceremonies to cleanse and nourish their bodies. When European settlers arrived on North American shores, it was the indigenous people that taught them to make pine needle tea to help cure their scurvy; pine needles are a great source of vitamin C.

Tea remains a popular hot drink among Canadians of European (especially British and Irish) heritage. Black orange pekoe tea and other breakfast-style teas may be drunk with the morning meal or during a mid-morning or afternoon break. These types of teas are typically served with milk and sugar. Red Rose and King Cole are some of the more well-known Canadian brands of tea, and the Tim Hortons chain of cafés serves their ready-to-drink "steeped tea," a strong breakfast-style tea. Cookies, tea biscuits or scones, and other pastries may accompany any tea that is served, but formal "afternoon tea" in the British tradition is typically confined to tourist destinations, such as Victoria's Empress Hotel or Toronto's Royal York Hotel.

=== United States ===
American tea culture encompasses the methods of preparation and means of consumption of tea within the context of the culture of the United States. American restaurants and workplaces typically offer machine-made drip brew coffee by default, while hot tea brewed by the cup with tea bags is available by request. Tea parties can be celebrated for many occasions, from the very small and intimate to the large family gatherings and celebrations.

In the Southern United States, a regional favorite called sweet tea – which is brewed, sweetened, and chilled before consumption – may be served at all meals and throughout the day as an alternative to other beverages. In the United States, about 85% of the tea consumed is served cold or iced. Iced tea is more frequently consumed during periods of hot weather or in lower latitudes, and hot tea is likewise more common in colder weather. Any confusion when visiting different parts of the country can easily be solved by explicitly asking for either "hot tea" or "iced tea." Afternoon tea, as a meal, is rarely served in the US except on ritualized special occasions such as the tea party or an afternoon out at a high-end hotel or restaurant, which may also offer cream tea on their menu.

Camellia sinensis, the source of tea leaves and buds, can be grown in warmer parts of the United States. Commercial cultivation has been tried at various times and locations since the 1700s, but tea has remained a niche crop and has never been cultivated widely in the United States. As of 2020, the US mainland has one relatively large plantation with complete mechanization in Charleston, South Carolina, and numerous small commercial tea gardens that pick tea by hand. Some growers feel that tea production is not viable without some mechanization, but there is evidence that unmechanized tea production is viable, albeit with lower net profit margins. Most domestically grown teas are available through mail order and online purchases.

As of 2016, the Charleston Tea Garden, located on Wadmalaw Island, outside of Charleston, South Carolina, is the only large-scale tea plantation in the United States, at 127 acres. Smaller scale commercial farms are located in the states of Alabama, Hawaii, Oregon, South Carolina, and Washington. There are also a handful of commercial farms in the process of being developed in the states of South Carolina, Mississippi, New York, and Texas. Still, they have yet to reach the point of selling products to the general public regularly.

==== Formal tea ====
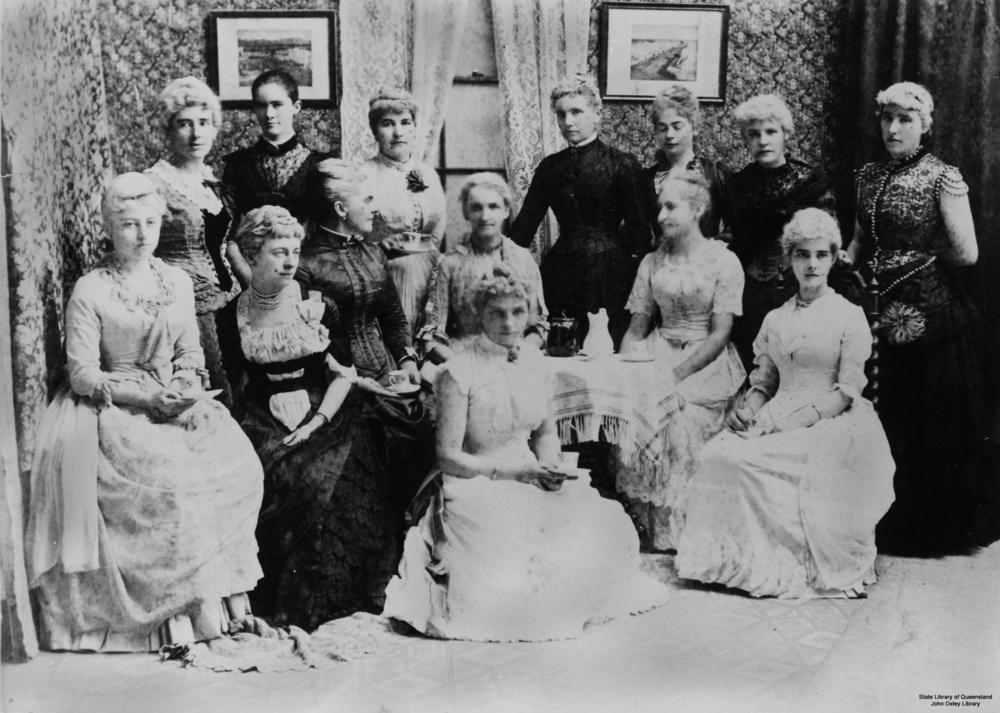
Portrait of a group of ladies at a tea party

Formal tea service, hosted at home or a historic building as part of a social event, is part of the United States culture, a skill preserved and passed down from generation to generation through the hereditary families whose ancestors founded the 13 New England colonies or fought in the American Revolution. There are hundreds of heritage societies. Many of the oldest are listed in the Hereditary Register of the United States of America.

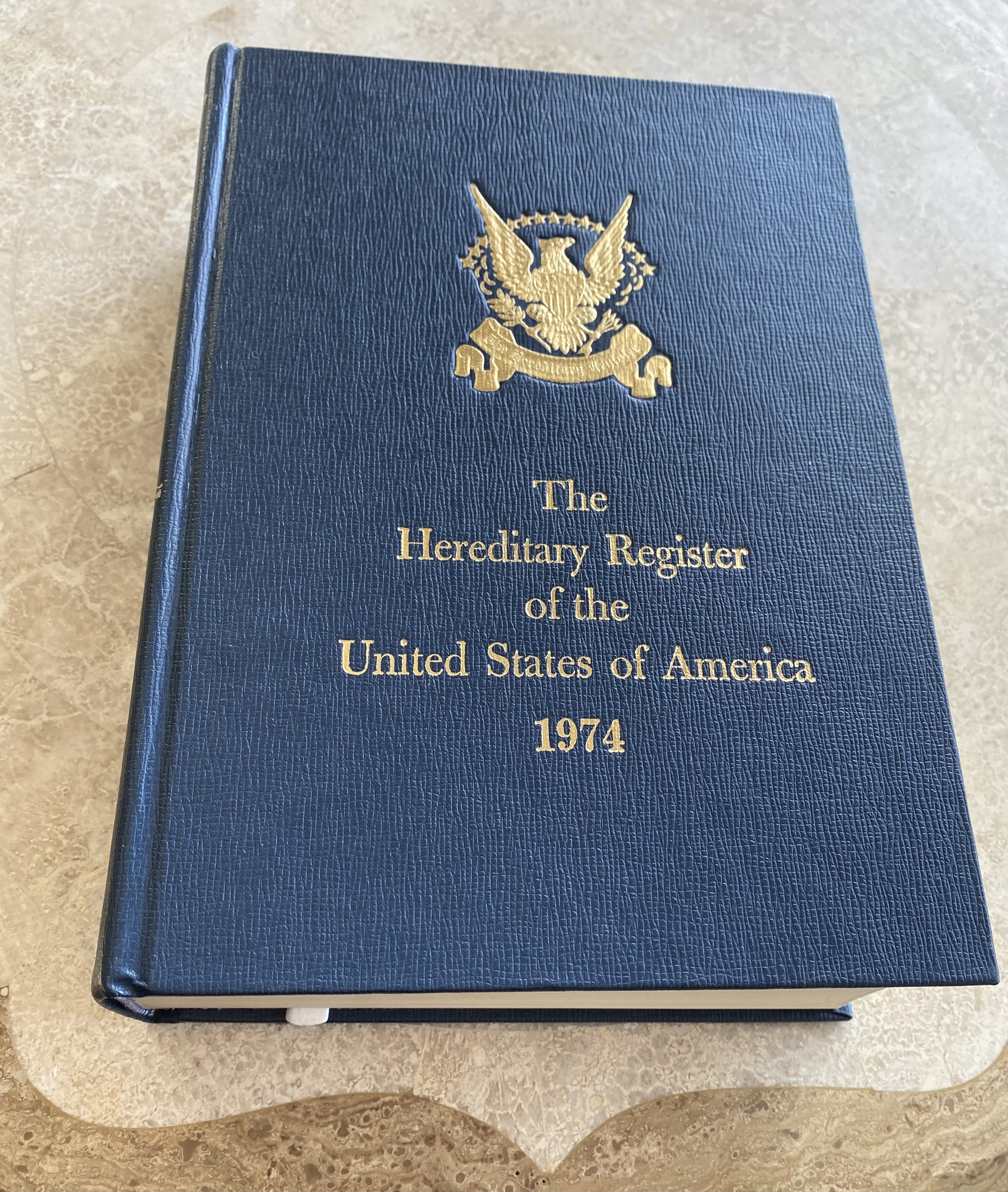
Hereditary Register of the United States of America 1974 Library of Congress Catalogue No 76-184658

A formal tea is often hosted in the home of a society lady or by an organization, primarily of women. There may be a formal meeting followed by socialization amongst those present where introductions are made, and recognitions are given. A formal tea might be referred to as a tea party and where the women who are hosting the party or attending the party are well known in their local society, there might also be a newspaper article mentioning prominent society members and their families who attended the event.

==== Tea as popular culture ====
In the United States, tea can typically be served at all meals as an alternative to coffee when served hot or soft drinks when served iced. Tea is also consumed throughout the day as a beverage. Afternoon tea, the meal done in the English tradition, is rarely served in the United States, although it remains romanticized by small children; it is usually reserved for special occasions like tea parties.

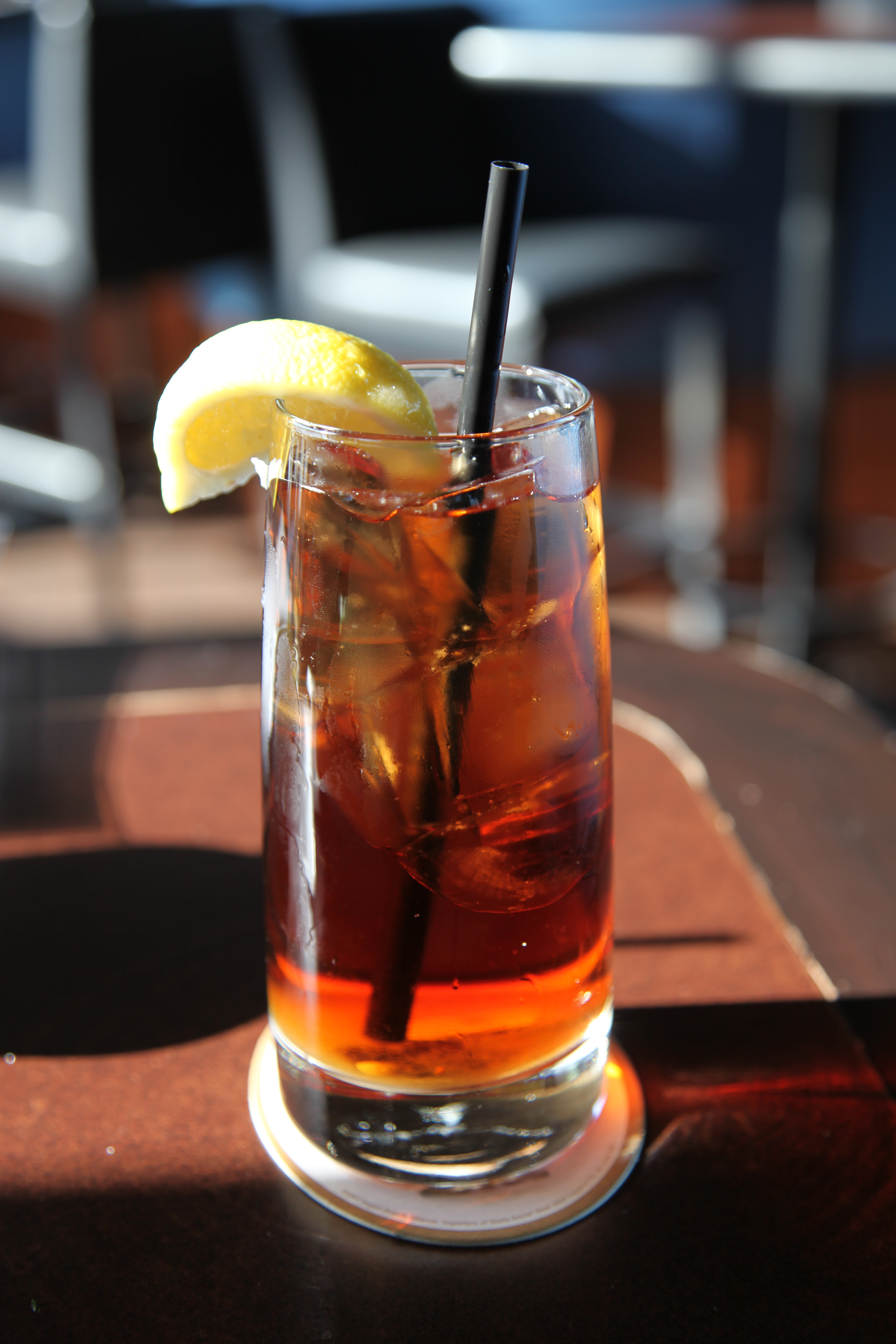
Iced tea is popular in the United States.

Iced tea has become an iconic symbol of the Southern United States and Southern hospitality, often appearing alongside summer barbecue cooking or grilled foods. Iced tea is often made as sweet tea, which is simply iced tea with copious amounts of sugar or sweetener.

Iced tea can be purchased like soda in canned or bottled form at vending machines and convenience stores. This pre-made tea is usually sweetened. Sometimes other flavorings, such as lemon or raspberry, are added. Many restaurants dispense iced tea brewed throughout the day from upright containers.

Decaffeinated tea is widely available in the United States for those who wish to reduce the physiological effects of caffeine.

Before World War II, the US preference for tea was equally split between green tea and black tea, 40% and 40%, with the remaining 20% preferring oolong tea. The war cut off the United States from its primary sources of green tea, China and Japan, leaving it with tea almost exclusively from British-controlled India, which produced black tea. After the war, nearly 99% of the tea consumed was black tea. Green, oolong, and white teas have recently become more popular again, and are often touted as health foods.

Fast-food coffee chains have significantly impacted how Americans are exposed to herbal and exotic teas. Once considered a rarity, chai, based on Indian masala chai, has become a popular option for people who might drink a caffè latte. Although not as commercialized.

Taiwanese-style bubble tea was introduced in the United States in the 1990s, but interest began to swell in the early to mid-2000s owing to the widespread success of bubble tea chains. Offering variations of the traditional bubble tea form (milk tea with tapioca pearls) was effective in bringing in a more diverse client base for popular bubble tea chains like Boba Guys.

== South America ==
=== Argentina ===
While coffee is more popular than tea in Argentina due to masification of the coffee industry in the 20th century, Argentina shares in the unique mate culture of the Rioplatense region. Argentines are known for carrying around a mate, or gourd, and bombilla, a special straining straw, to share mate with friends, family, and strangers throughout the day. The tea itself is known as yerba mate.

=== Brazil ===
Brazilian tea culture has its origins with the infused beverages or chás (Portuguese pronunciation: [ˈʃas]), made by the indigenous cultures of the south region. It has evolved since the Portuguese colonial period to include imported varieties and tea-drinking customs. There is a folk knowledge in Brazil which says that Brazilians, mainly the urban ones, have a greater taste for using sugar in teas than in other cultures due to the lack of habit to unsweetened drinks.

=== Chile ===
Chile tea consumption per capita ranks amongst the highest in the world and is by far the highest within Latin America. Chile's tea culture draws back to both English immigration and the general Anglophilia within the Chilean elites during the 19th century, with consumption of the drink spreading quickly among all social classes as inexpensive alternatives reached the market. Besides black and green tea, Chileans often store herbal infusions, such as chamomile and matico. Although there is not a fixed moment of the day for tea consumption (it being a common breakfast alternative to coffee and also a regular after-lunch staple), it is most commonly associated with the late afternoon meal of the once (lit. 'elevenses' in Spanish, though contrary to most variations of the meal it is not a morning snack), which most Chileans report as having instead of dinner.

History

The popular consumption of tea dates back to the 18th century, initially promoted by sailors from England, who arrived in the port cities during the time of colonial Chile, to later, once independence from Spain was obtained, spread with the arrival of British immigrants, especially by the English in Valparaíso, Punta Arenas and Antofagasta, who managed to massify their custom of "tea time" in the Chilean population, initially within the aristocracy, and later spread to all social classes in the country. In 1767, the authorities of the Kingdom of Chile created a tax on yerba mate, a very popular drink at the time, with the purpose of financing the construction of the Cal y Canto de Santiago bridge, thus increasing the cost of this concoction, for which the working class was forced to drink tea instead, as a cheaper alternative.

At eleven, a typical Chilean meal served after lunch, tea is one of the most consumed beverages in the entire country.

During the 20th century, tea rooms began to become popular in different cities of Chile, closed spaces for social gatherings, especially attended by the female public and dedicated to social gatherings, where attendees drank tea accompanied by cookies or some other plate of traditional Chilean pastries During the 21st century, the consumption of tea in Chile experienced a diversification in the existing offer in the national market, slowly increasing the consumption of other varieties of tea other than traditional black tea, such as green tea, in addition to an increase in associated brands. to the "premium" or gourmet category, which offer a higher quality of their products. This coincided with the increase in the opening of "teterías", specialized premises with a wide variety of teas, to serve and to take away.

Tea as a meal

According to a 2018 study prepared by the Food and Agriculture Organization of the United Nations (FAO), Chile is one of the fifteen largest tea consumers in the world and the main one in Latin America.

Elevenses (Las once) are a traditional Chilean meal served at mid-afternoon-night —when tea is taken along with cakes, various desserts, and various varieties of bread, which is widely used in Chile, with its accompaniments, in the manner of tea time. English (afternoon tea or high tea), It usually varies in content, depending on the region of Chile, and the time it is served, but normally it is customary to "take once" between 6:00 p.m. and 8:00 p.m.

== Oceania ==
=== Australia ===
Australian cuisine has historically been influenced by British cuisine and British tea culture. Australian Indigenous people usually drank native tea. However, tea consumption in Australia increased because of British colonisation of the country. Popular brands of tea sold in Australia are Bushells, Dilmah and Nerada.

Billy tea is the drink prepared by the ill-fated swagman in the popular Australian folk song "Waltzing Matilda". Boiling water for tea over a campfire and adding a gum leaf for flavouring remains an iconic traditional Australian method for preparing tea, which was a staple drink of the Australian colonial period.

=== New Zealand ===
New Zealand is one of the highest tea consumption countries per capita in the World and Oceania. Like Canada and Australia, New Zealand Tea Culture is influenced by British Tea Culture.

== See also ==
- Coffee culture
- Cannabis culture
- Drinking culture
- History of tea
- International Tea Day
- Teacake
- Teaism
- Yerba mate
