= Coffee cup (disambiguation) =

A coffee cup is a cup used to hold the beverage of coffee.

Coffee cup or Coffee Cup may also refer to:

== Cups ==
- Coffee mug, a style of cup for coffee
- Tasse à café (French: coffee cup, cup for coffee), a style of coffee cup
- New York coffee cup, a style of paper coffee cup originating in Greek diners of New York City
- Single-serve coffee container (coffee cup, coffee K-cup), a container cup of coffee mix for an instant coffee machine to make a cup of coffee

== Other uses ==
- Claudius J. "Coffee Cup" Cup, a fictional character from the 1943 U.S. film A Girl, a Guy and a Gob
- "The Coffee Cup", 2009 season 6 number 8 episode 119 of U.S. TV soap opera Desperate Housewives
- Operation Coffee Cup, a mid-century American Medical Association political campaign
- The coffee cup, a British culinary measurement unit

== See also ==
- Coffee cupping, the practice of observing the tastes and aromas of brewed coffee
- Coffee Pot Cup, a USL-MSL interleague soccer game
- All pages with titles contianing "coffee" and "cup"
- Cup of Coffee (disambiguation)
- Coffee (disambiguation)
- Cup (disambiguation)
