= Cup of coffee =

Cup of Coffee (with or without a preceding article) may refer to:

- A cup containing coffee (the beverage)
- A coffee cup (the container for the beverage)
- A cup of coffee (sports idiom), an idiom in North American sports for a short time spent by a minor-league player at the major-league level

== Productions ==
- A Cup of Coffee, a 1931 Preston Sturges play

== Songs ==
- "Cup of Coffee", a song by Garbage from the 2001 album Beautiful Garbage
- "A Cup of Coffee", a song by Katy Perry from the 2008 album One of the Boys

== Other uses ==
- Tasse à café (French: cup for coffee, coffee cup), a style of coffee cup
- Coffee mug, a style of cup for coffee
- Single-serve coffee container (cup of coffee, K-cup of coffee), a container cup of coffee mix for an instant coffee machine to make a cup of coffee

== See also ==
- A Cup of Coffee and New Shoes On, a 2022 drama film written and directed by Gentian Koçi
- "A Cup of Coffee, a Sandwich and You", a 1925 song written by Joseph Meyer
- "Proper Cup of Coffee", a 1926 novelty song
- Coffee cup (disambiguation)
- Cup of Joe (disambiguation)
- Cup of Tea (disambiguation)
- Coffee (disambiguation)
- Cup (disambiguation)
- Cuppa Joe, American slang for a cup of coffee
