= Demitasse =

Small cup used to serve coffee

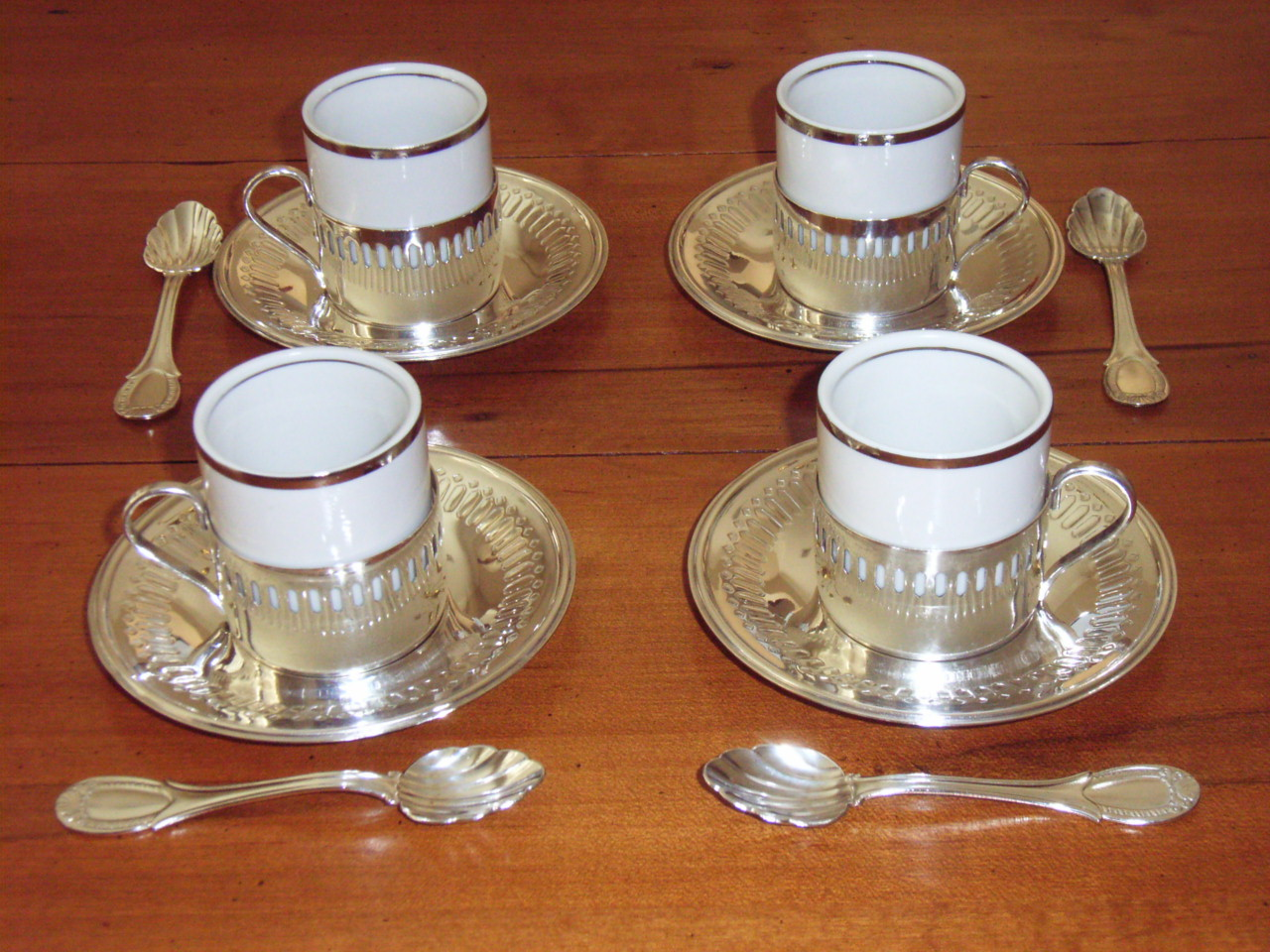
Demitasse set with metal frames and spoons

A demitasse (/ˈdɛmɪtæs/; French: "half cup"), demi-tasse, or espresso cup is a small cup used to serve espresso. It may also refer to the coffee served in such a cup, though that usage has disappeared in France by the early 20th century.

A demitasse typically has a capacity of approximately 60–90 millilitres (2–3 US fl oz), half the size of a full coffee cup (a tasse à café is about 120 millilitres (4 US fl oz)). The Italian Espresso National Institute recommends serving espresso in a white china cup holding 50−100 ml. They are typically ceramic and accompanied by matching saucers, but some coffeehouses and china companies also produce brightly decorated varieties. Another type of demitasse has a glass cup set into a metal cup-holder frame, called a zarf in Turkey.

Demitasse cups are small because they usually serve espresso, which is a stronger, more concentrated coffee, best served in smaller portions.

A demitasse-sized cup, known as a finjan, is traditionally used for serving Turkish and Arabic coffee.

== See also ==
- Demitasse spoon
