= Zarf (disambiguation) =

A zarf is an ornamental holder for hot coffee cups.

Zarf may also refer to:

- Andrew Plotkin (born 1970), nicknamed Zarf, American computer programmer and game designer
- Zarf (AMC) or Zoe Luper, a character from the American soap opera All My Children
- ZARF, a US Air Force tiger team project that tested Multics security in 1973
