= Cup of Tea =

Cup of Tea (with or without a preceding article) may refer to:

- A cup of tea (the beverage), or a teacup (the container itself)
- "Cup of tea" as an idiom, referring to a preference
  - Often used in the negative: "X is not my cup of tea" means "I don't like X."

== Music ==
- "Cup of Tea", a song by The Verve Pipe, from the 1996 album Villains
- Cup of Tea (album), a 2000 album by Irish traditional band Sláinte
- My Cup of Tea, a 2007 album by Hacken Lee

== Publications ==
- A Cup of Tea, a 1922 short story by Katherine Mansfield
- "A Nice Cup of Tea", a 1946 essay by English author George Orwell
- A Nice Cup of Tea (novel), a 1950 novel by British writer Anthony Gilbert
- Three Cups of Tea, a 2006 book by Greg Mortenson and David Oliver Relin

== Other uses ==
- The Cup of Tea, a 19th century painting by American artist Mary Cassatt
- A Cup of Tea, a Bex and a Good Lie Down, a 1965 Australian stage revue by John McKellar

== See also ==
- My Cup of T, a 2007 EP by Theresa Fu
- Cup of Coffee (disambiguation)
