= Saucer =

Type of small dishware

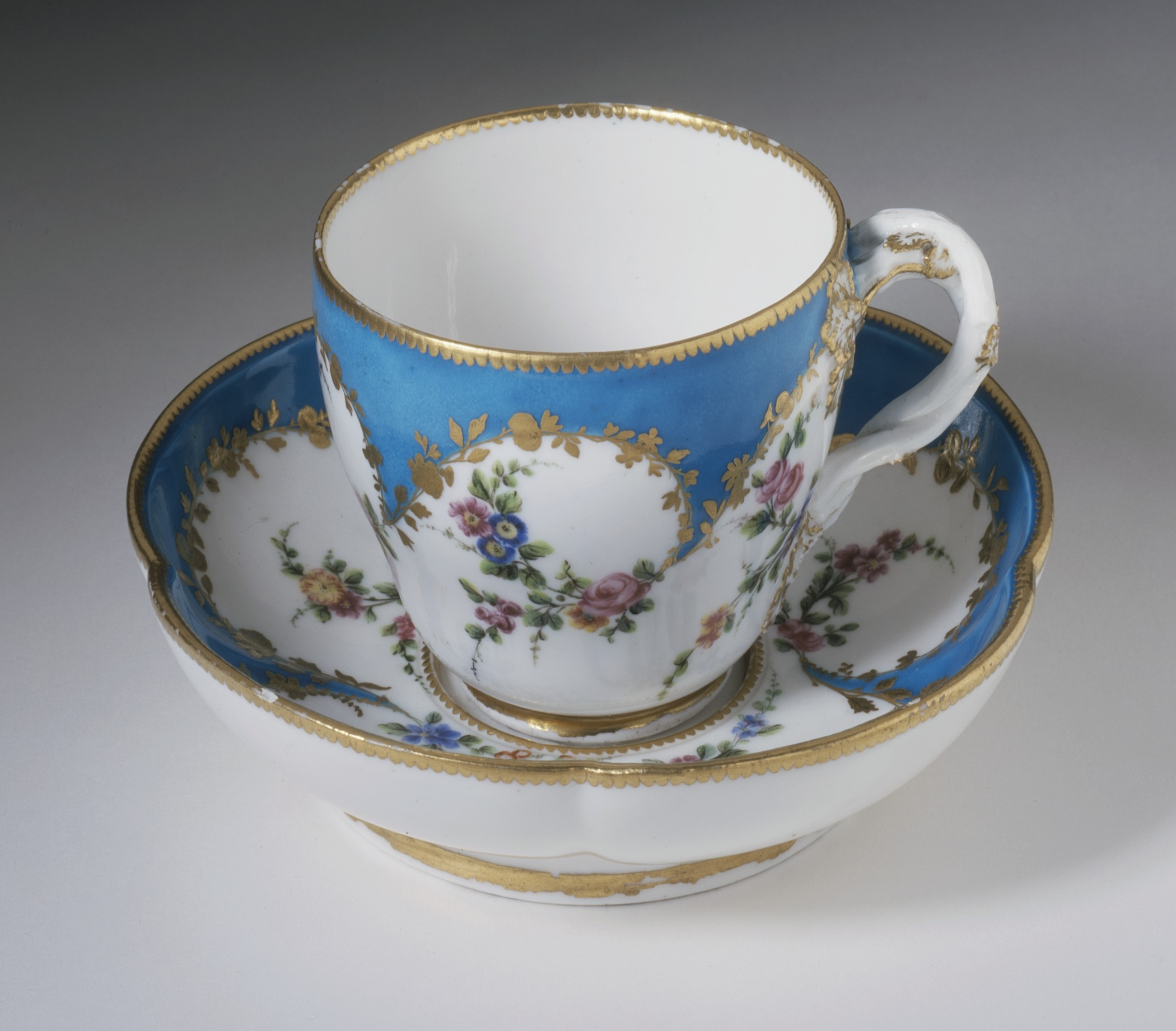
Rococo cup with saucer, c. 1753, soft-paste porcelain with glaze and enamel, Los Angeles County Museum of Art

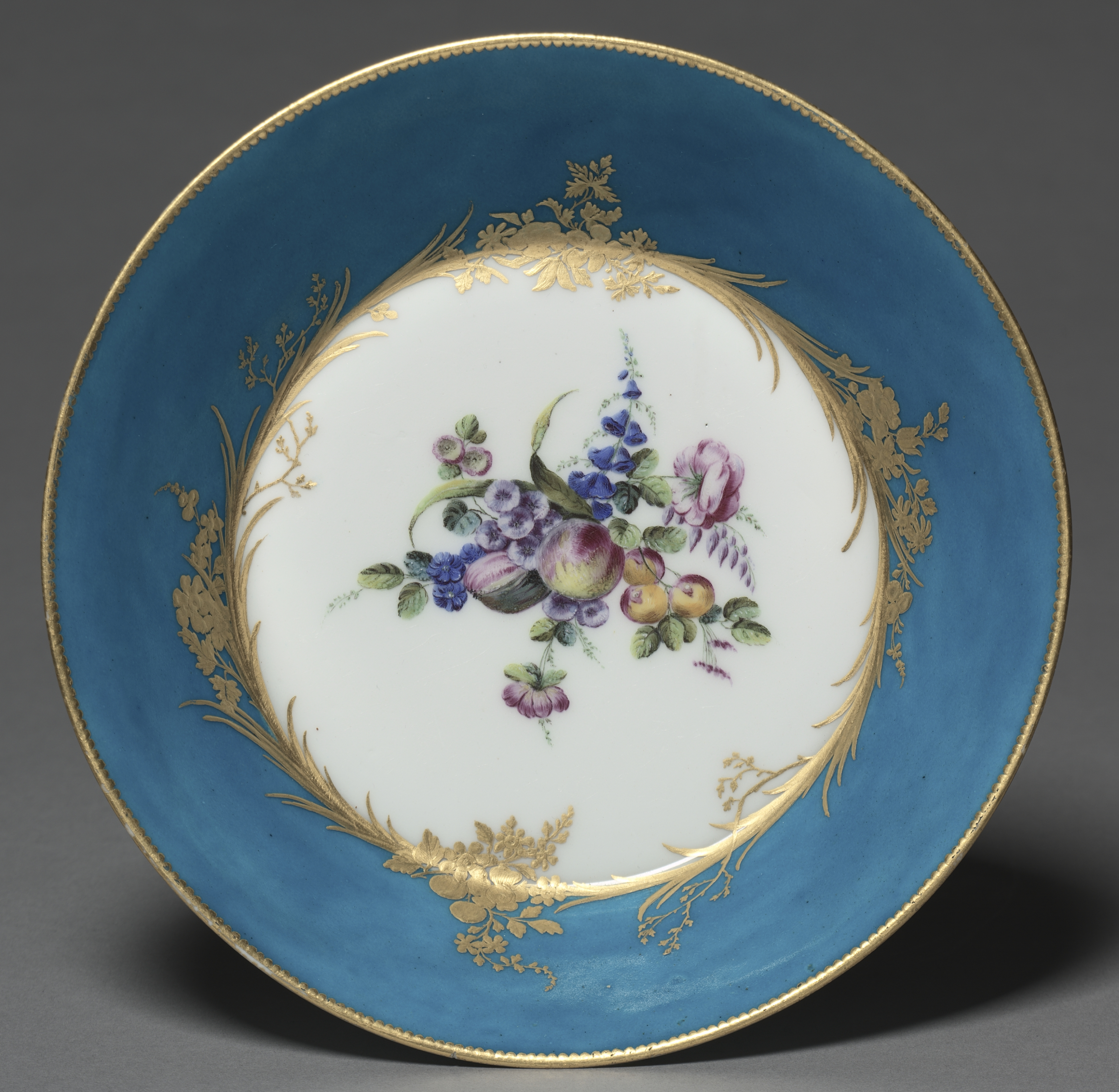
Saucer, 1753, soft-paste porcelain with enamel and gilt decoration, Cleveland Museum of Art (USA)

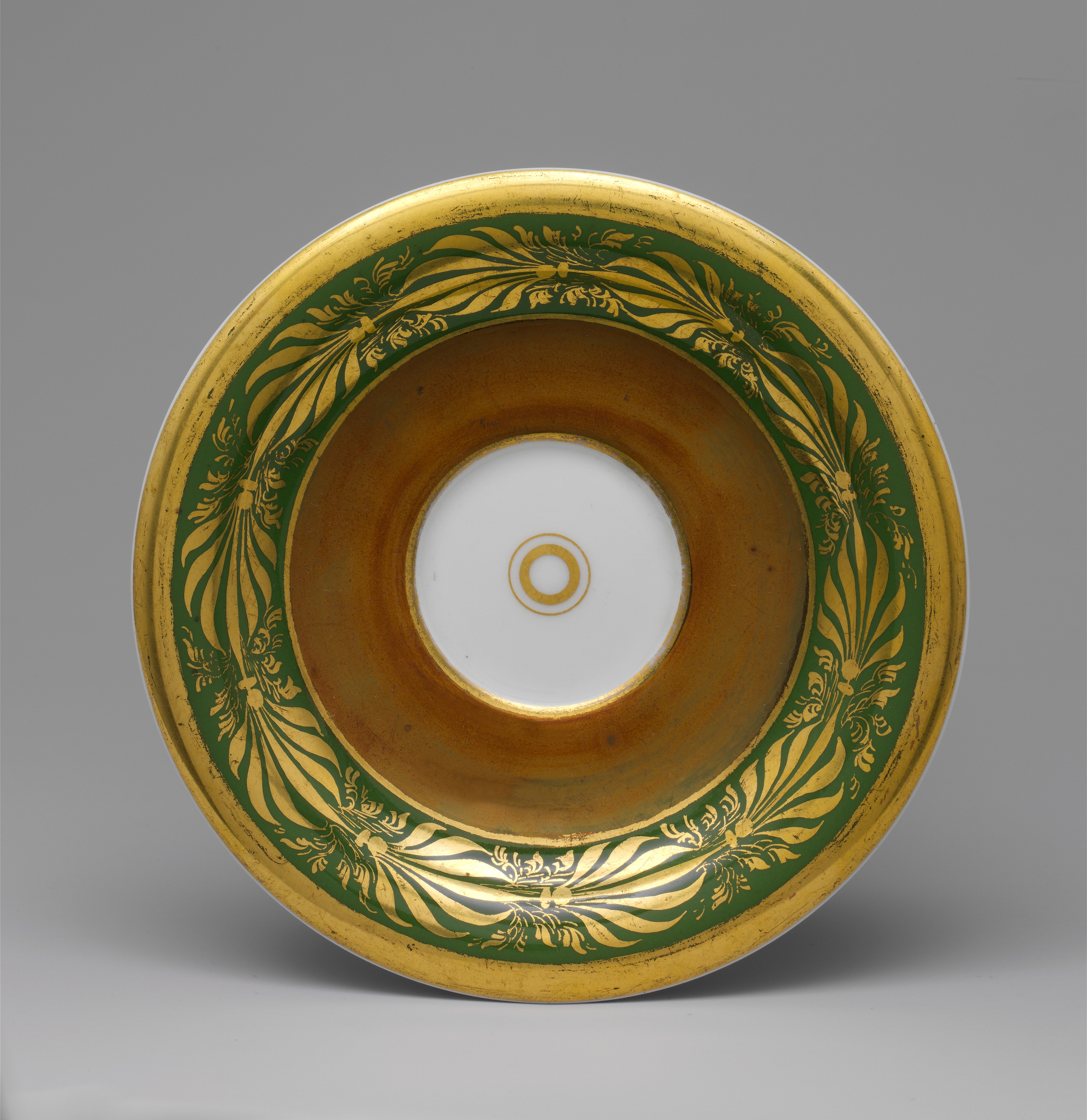
German saucer, by Koenigliche Porzellan Manufaktur, c. 1844–1847, porcelain, diameter: 14.6 cm, Metropolitan Museum of Art (New York City)

A saucer is a type of small dishware used to support a cup or a potted plant. In the Middle Ages, saucers were used for serving condiments and powdered sauces.

== Etymology ==
The word saucer entered Middle English in the mid-14th century, derived from Anglo-Latin saucerium and Old French saussier (Modern French saucière), meaning "sauce dish". The Old French form itself derives from sauce, coming from Latin salsus ("salted"). Its meaning as a small vessel for supporting a cup is attested from around 1700.

== Overview ==
The center of the saucer often contains a depression or raised ring sized to fit a matching cup; this was only introduced in the late 17th century. The saucer is useful for protecting surfaces from possible damage due to the heat of a cup, and to catch overflow, splashes, and drips from the cup, thus protecting both table linen and the user sitting in a free-standing chair who holds both cup and saucer. The saucer also provides a convenient place for a wet spoon, as might be used to stir the drink in the cup in order to mix sweeteners or creamers into tea or coffee.

Some people pour hot tea or coffee from the cup into the saucer; the increased surface area of the liquid exposed to the air increases the rate at which it cools, allowing the drinker to consume the beverage quickly after preparation. This was a common practice in the 18th century, although the saucers that were used were deeper than modern saucers.

Although often part of a place setting in a tea or dinner set, teacups with unique styling are often sold with matching saucers, sometimes alone, or as part of a tea set, including a teapot and small dessert plates.

== History ==
The use of a small dish beneath a teacup or coffee cup developed during the 17th century in China. According to tradition, the practice originated when the daughter of a military official, finding it difficult to handle hot bowls of tea, asked a local potter to devise a small plate on which to rest the bowl. This coincided historically with the introduction of tea to Europe, and Europeans thus adopted the saucer.

In Europe, the saucer was predominantly used from the late 17th century onward, initially as a flat or lipped dish intended to catch drips from teacups and coffee cups, which at that time typically lacked handles. The saucer also served as an alternative holding surface when a cup was too hot to grasp directly, a function similar to the coffee cup sleeve.

== Thermal transport ==
When placed beneath a cup, saucers have very little direct influence on beverage cooling rate. For hot, water-based beverages (e.g. tea or coffee), cooling rate in a cup is typically dominated by evaporation, which occurs across the free surface in contact with the air. Heat transfer through the bottom of the cup is small relative to heat lost through the top of the cup. Further reducing the heat lost through the bottom of the cup has little effect on the cooling rate of the beverage.

Placing a saucer on top of a cup, however, inhibits evaporative cooling and is thus an effective way of reducing the cooling rate so that the drink remains warmer for longer. The reduction in heat loss due to evaporation is typically much greater than the increase in heat loss associated with conduction through the saucer (and subsequent radiation or convective transfer to the surrounding air). By placing the saucer below the cup, it creates a barrier for comfort between the heat of the cup and the skin.

== Historical reference ==
When Jefferson returned from France...he asked George Washington why the Senate had been created. Washington replied by asking Jefferson "Why did you pour that tea into your saucer?" "To cool it," said Jefferson. "Even so," responded Washington, "we pour legislation into the senatorial saucer to cool it."

— Floor Speech By Senator Chuck Grassley

However, the earliest publication of this supposed interchange appears to be 1872.

== Gallery ==
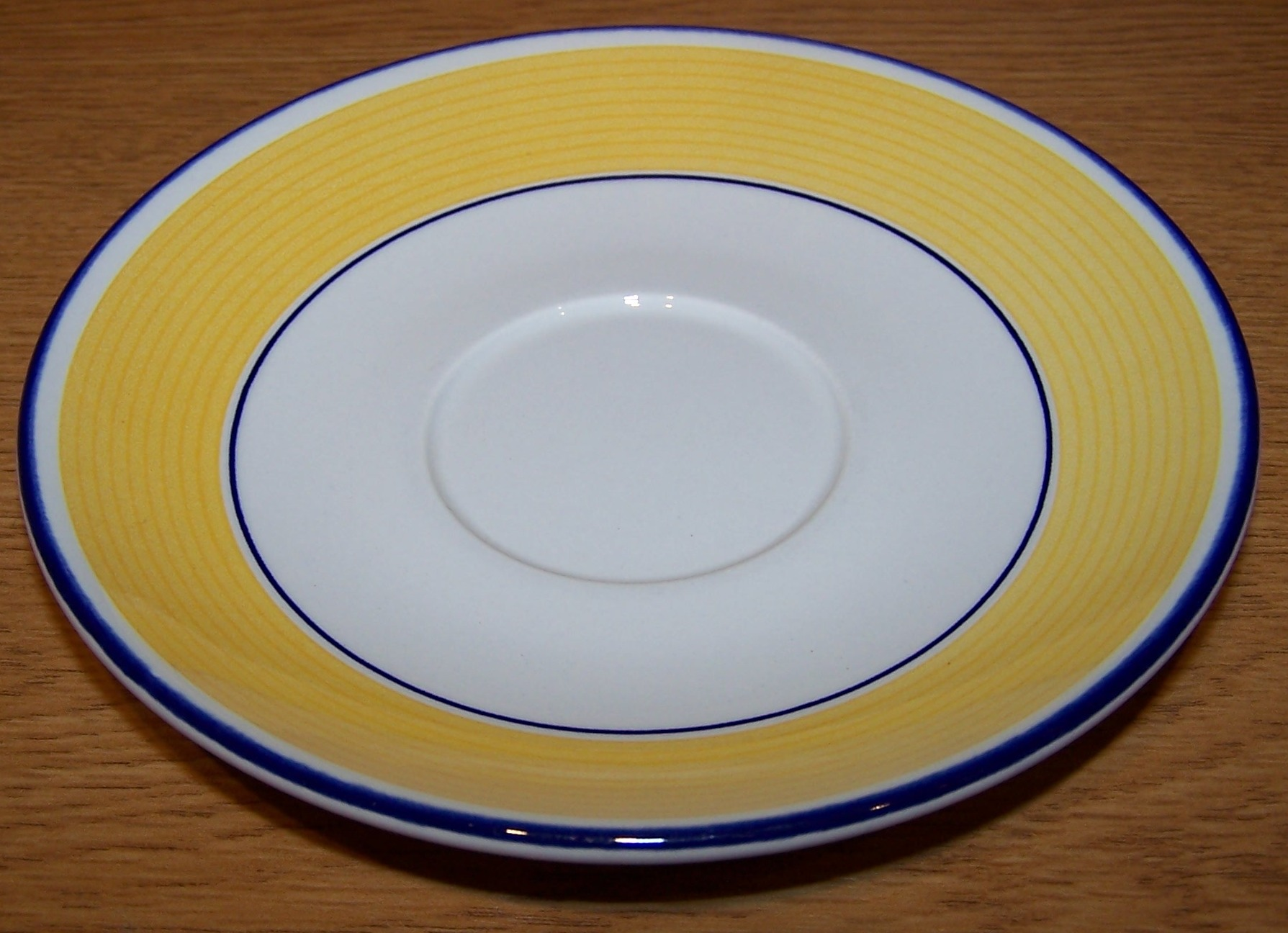
Department store-ware

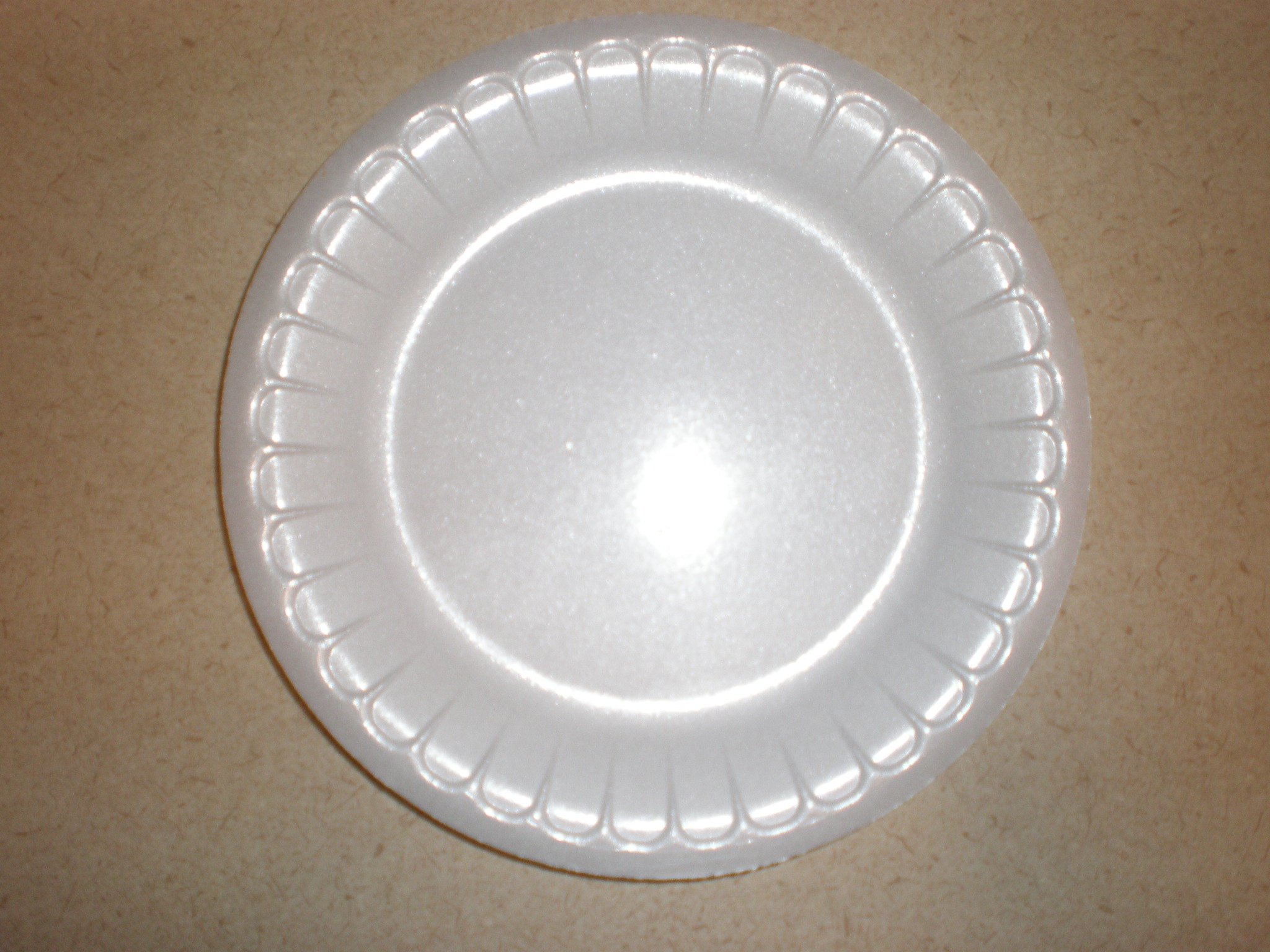
Styrofoam saucer

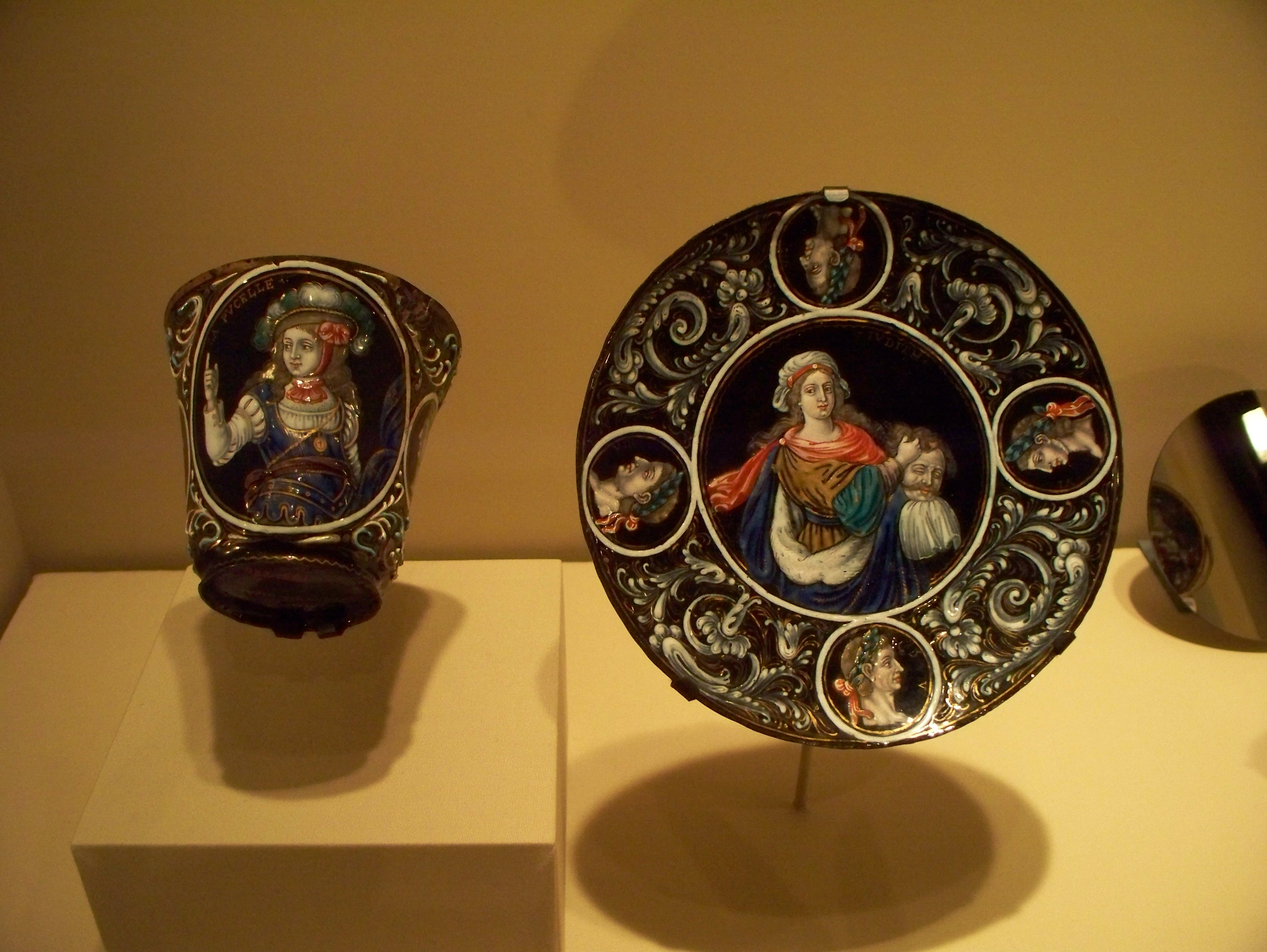
Antique

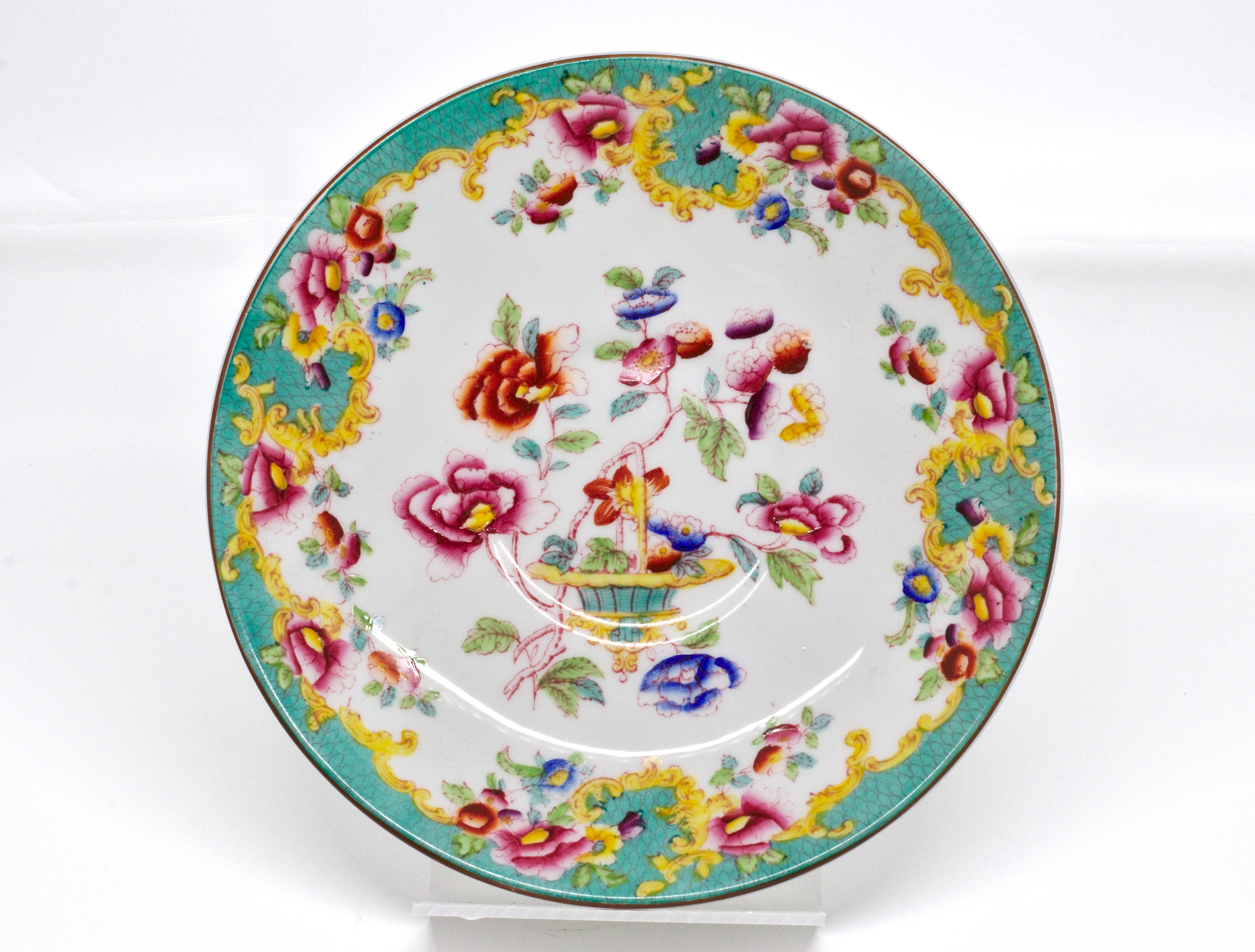
Faience saucer of the Maison Losseau collections

== See also ==
- Coaster, used to protect the surface where the user might place a beverage
- Plate, used to serve food
- Trembleuse, a saucer with a deep cup-holding well, similar to a cup holder
- Podstakannik, a metal tea-glass holder in Russian style (with a handle)
- Zarf, a metal coffee-cup holder in Turkish style (handle-less)
