= Koozie =

Beverage insulator

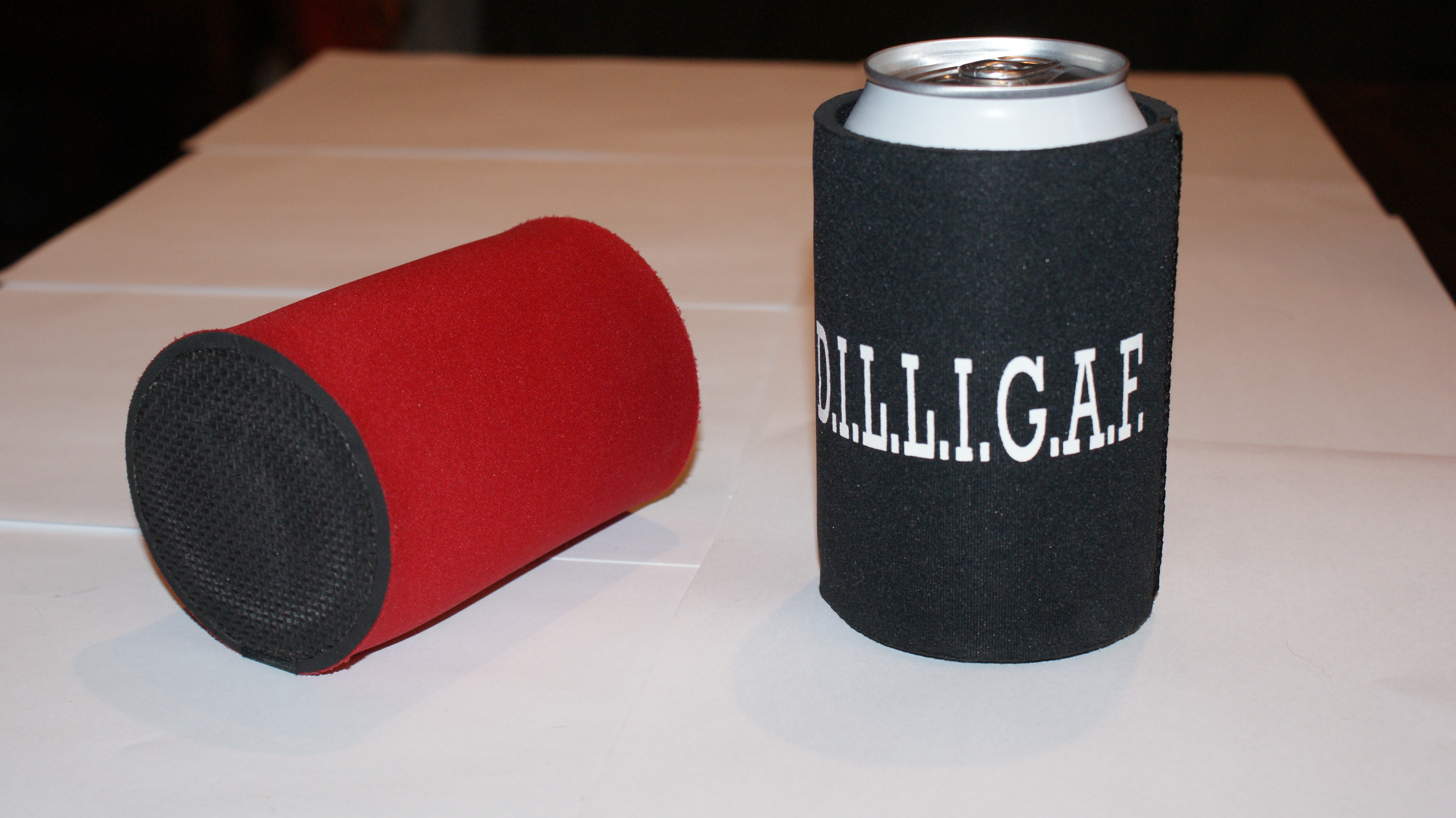
Koozies

A koozie ( /ˈkuːzi/ KOO-zee) (US) or stubby holder (Australian) is a fabric or foam sleeve that is designed to thermally insulate a beverage container, like a can or bottle.

== Name, origin, and trademark dispute ==
The name "Koozie", with a capital "K", is a federally registered trademark in the United States, originally coined by Bob Autrey of San Antonio, Texas, and rights later sold to Radio Cap Corporation (RCC) as the KOOZIE in the early 1980s. The company RCC specialized in baseball caps before registering a trademark for the name KOOZIE in 1980, and subsequently introducing the product as a can cooler in 1982. As the promotional product industry grew, more products were added to the KOOZIE brand, including drinkware, more styles of can coolers, cooler bags, outdoor leisure items, travel accessories, and business accessories. The word koozie has also lost its trademark numerous times over the years, making it a regular everyday word in the English language, similar to words like onesie, zamboni, and hula hoop. These are brand name products that have been subject to genericide—"the process by which a brand name loses its distinctive identity as a result of being used to refer to any product or service of its kind."

Norwood Promotional Products acquired RCC in 1991 and continued to grow the KOOZIE line of products. In 2009, BIC Graphic purchased Norwood and its sub-brands. BIC Graphic dropped the "RCC" in favor of the KOOZIE brand name and expanded the line to include additional styles of can coolers, cooler bags and totes, as well as housewares.

Norwood was in a dispute, on-and-off over several years in the 2000s, over the Koozie trademark status with an online retail business called Kustom Koozies. Norwood asserts that names such as beer hugger, can cooler, and huggie do not infringe its trademark, but that koozie, coozie, coolie, and cozy do. Kustom Koozies asserted in 2005 that the trademark had become generic. In the years since, Norwood and Kustom Koozies came to a licensing agreement over the use of the trademark, but by 2009 they were in dispute again, as Kustom Koozies tried and failed to cancel the trademark licensing agreement in response to Norwood instructing it to make certain changes to its website, one of which was that "Koozie" should be set out in all-capital letters as "KOOZIE," and another being that the registered trademark symbol "®" be used to identify genuine Norwood KOOZIE brand beverage sleeves.

In December 10 2025, a Newfane family business called Better Wheel Workshops, which makes wooden can insulators originally known as the "Woodzie", settled a trademark dispute with the Koozie Group, which holds a trademark to the word "koozie", the conditions being that the "Woodzie" be renamed to "Tree Sleeves". Better Wheel Workshops has been making the wooden can insulators for a decade before they were informed about a year-and-a-half ago that the Koozie Group filed a petition with the U.S. Patent and Trademark Office to cancel the "Woodzie" trademark over potential confusion.

In Australia, the beverage insulator is called a stubby holder because local beer was traditionally sold in 375 mL (13.2 imp fl oz; 12.7 US fl oz) bottles colloquially known as "stubbies" due to their short, squat appearance in comparison to the alternative packaging of 750 mL (26 imp fl oz; 25 US fl oz) bottles ("king brown", "tallie", or simply "bottle"), and the 300 to 375 mL (10.6 to 13.2 imp fl oz; 10.1 to 12.7 US fl oz) longneck bottles commonly used for beer imported from North America and Europe. Most Australian domestic beers have now adopted longneck bottles and/or aluminium cans ("tinnies") for their 375 mL (13.2 imp fl oz; 12.7 US fl oz) packaging, and 750 mL (26 imp fl oz; 25 US fl oz) bottles are now sold much less commonly than was the case historically. Victoria Bitter (VB) is notable for continuing to use the traditional stubby, albeit with a twist top replacing the traditional crown seal.

== Use ==
Koozies are used to insulate a chilled beverage from warming by warm air, sunlight, and body heat. Using a koozie can reduce the rate a drink warms in the sun by up to 50%.

These items can also be used for easily identifying one's beverage from another person's and for marketing or for minimizing the condensation on the can. By imprinting on the koozie, many different companies have used the koozie as a promotional giveaway because it is not only inexpensive to manufacture, but its frequent use is more likely to bring the company's name to a household presence. Originally a logo or image was screen-printed on a round foam cylinder with a foam base, which generally has a hole at the base to ease inserting and removing beverage containers.

== Materials and styles ==
The koozie has evolved in both material and style. Materials used include leather, neoprene, EVA, polyester, vinyl, and various open-cell and closed-cell foams. There are koozies for 40 oz. bottles, and adjustable koozies that fit different beverage container sizes.

== See also ==
- Cup holder
- Cooler
- Tea cosy
- Thermal insulation
- Vacuum flask
- Zarf
