= Cup plate =

Small plate used to hold teacups

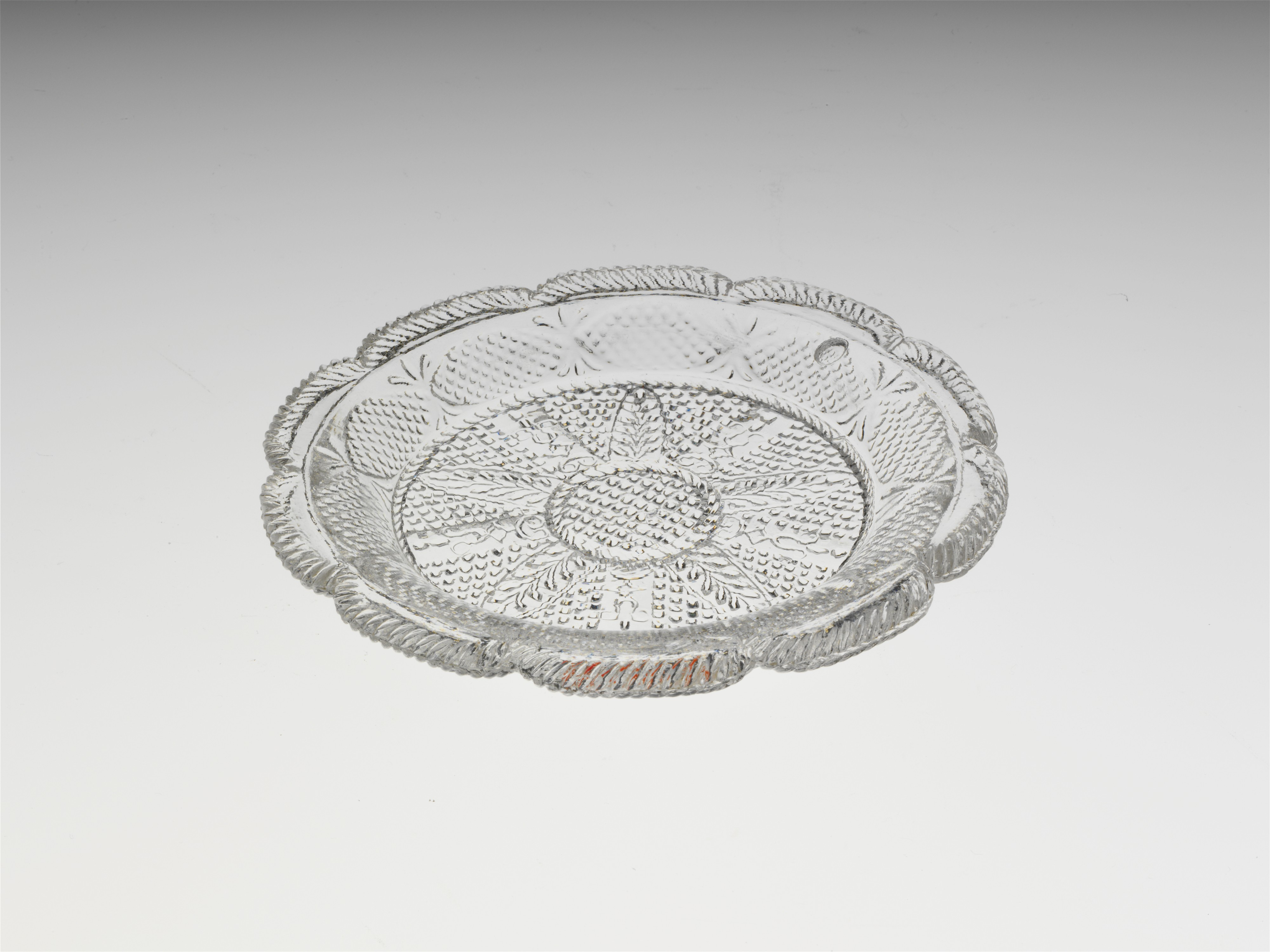
Cup plate made of pressed glass

Cup plates are coasters that provide a place to rest a tea cup while leaving space for a light snack. Teacup plates originated in England in the early 1800s and went out of fashion in the second half of the 19th century (Barber puts the peak of popularity in the US at 1840s), with a brief reappearance in the first third of the 20th century as bridge sets. The cup plates were in common use in the United States during the first half of the 19th century, and were a precursor of the very specialized dishes of Victorian era: ice cream sets, berry sets, lemonade sets, etc.

== Use ==
Shadel remarks that "it is difficult to pin down [the] first use" of the plates, and suggests that the ceramic plates arrived early in 1820s, with glass ones following in 1827, made by the New England Glass Company.

Barber indicates the original use of the plates as a rest for the partially empty teacup that protected the tablecloth and the table surface (similar to the modern drink coaster), while the tea was consumed from the saucers, a part of proper etiquette at the time. A household manual in 1840 recommended against buying teacups with handles, as they "are rarely used and soon knocked off". While drinking tea from the saucer was popular both in America and in Europe, it happened at different times: as the popularity of using a saucer to cool tea declined in England in 1780s-1790s, the habit picked up in the United States.

Shadel suggests that the cup plates were primarily used by the middle-class households. Their use rapidly declined in the 1860s. At this time the drinking of tea from the saucer was no longer considered appropriate, and the cup plates were repurposed for preserves, butter, and pickles.

== Design ==
The small, three inches in diameter, plates were made of glass or underglaze printed (transferware) Staffordshire pottery in blue and white. The latter, while manufactured in England, were intended for the American market, while the glass pieces are primarily of American origin, made at the factories in New England and Midwest.

Some designs were using plain, transparent glass, the other ones were opalescent or milky, with decoration in the form of concentric circles, or, on the rims, floral designs, scroll work, and stars. About 1840, the new patriotic or historical designs were introduced, featuring historical monuments, important steamships, and busts of the famous men. For example, one design commemorated the Battle of Bunker Hill through an image of an obelisk-like structure that was supposed to represent an actual monument erected on the site of the battle 68 years after the battle, in 1843. The William Henry Harrison 1840 presidential campaign yielded the plates with log cabin and hard cider device and the portrait of Harrison himself in uniform. During or shortly after the presidential campaign of Henry Clay, a plate was issued commemorating Clay (although the portrait itself was a likeness of Julius Caesar).

Of the many steamboat designs, one of the rarest shows a sidewheel ship with an F on the paddleboard, "B. F." on the flag, and the "Benjamin Franklin" above the vessel. The rim contains patriotic emblems: stars, anchors, and the American eagle on the background of tiny dots raised on the underside. Similar design bears a name of "Chancellor Livingston" (Robert R. Livingston not only was one of the drafters of the Declaration of Independence, but also participated in Robert Fulton's steamboat ventures). British manufacturers produced similar designs using blue glass with the steamship line names: Troy Line, Union Line, etc.

Few samples of glass plates made by blowing the glass into the mold exist, but the vast majority is made from the pressed glass, as the plates got popular almost simultaneously with the invention of the glass pressing machines. Cup plates were produced in myriad designs in flint glass, and later in soda glass, before the decline in popularity of tea parties which occurred after the Civil War era.

== American market ==
Many plates were produced, in a variety of designs, from flint glass, the only glass produced by early American glass factories. European glass factories (Baccarat, Val St. Lambert) produced cup plates for the American market, but the great majority were of American manufacture.

Cup plates were also used to commemorate historical figures, including George Washington and Henry Harrison. These cup plates are called "Historicals". Being enshrined in cup plate history was quite an impressive honor. These are very valuable in modern times. The second type of American cup plates were "Conventionals", or cup plates that simply portrayed the latest in abstract glass design. These were very appealing and "flashy".

== Sources ==
- Ukers, William Harrison (1935). "Evolution of tea-making appliances". All about Tea, Volume 2. Tea and coffee trade journal Company. pp. 436–448. OCLC 1201914.
- Barber, Edwin Atlee (1900). "Glass Cup Plates". American Glassware, Old and New: A Sketch of the Glass Industry in the United States and Manual for Collectors of Historical Bottles. Press of Patterson & White Company. pp. 83–88. OCLC 1008478020.
- Shadel, Jane S. (1971). "Documented Use of Cup Plates in the Nineteenth Century". Journal of Glass Studies. 13: 128–133. JSTOR 24182823.
