= Jay Sorensen =

American inventor and entrepreneur

Jay Sorensen is an American inventor, real estate broker, and entrepreneur best known for inventing the coffee cup sleeve in 1991, and founding Java Jacket, a company manufacturing coffee cup sleeves, in 1993.

== Previous work ==
Sorensen managed a "family business" gas station in Portland, Oregon until Shell Oil ceased operations there. He then worked in real estate, but by his own account "wasn't very good at it".

== Inventing the coffee cup sleeve ==
Sorensen had the idea first in 1989, when he was taking his daughter to school and burnt his fingers due to his drive-thru restaurant coffee, dropping the full 12 ounces into his lap. He later invented it in 1991, and patented it in 1995.

== Java Jacket ==
Sorensen formed Java Jacket in 1993 and it was an instant hit. His wife Colleen also worked for the business.

Today, Java Jacket sells over one billion coffee cup sleeves a year.

=== Troubles with Starbucks ===
Sorensen offered the product to Starbucks, which had interest in the product, but Sorensen did not accept the conditions of operating- Starbucks demanded exclusive rights and spent eight months "dragging its feet" about the product, wanting alterations and trying to "play hardball on price".

A patent war began between Java Jacket and Starbucks; Sorensen called the Starbucks version "a direct infringement of ours" and filed a cease-and-desist order. Designing around Sorensen's patents, Starbucks was eventually able to create the Coffee Clutch, a product like the Java Jacket.
