= Teacup =

Cup for tea

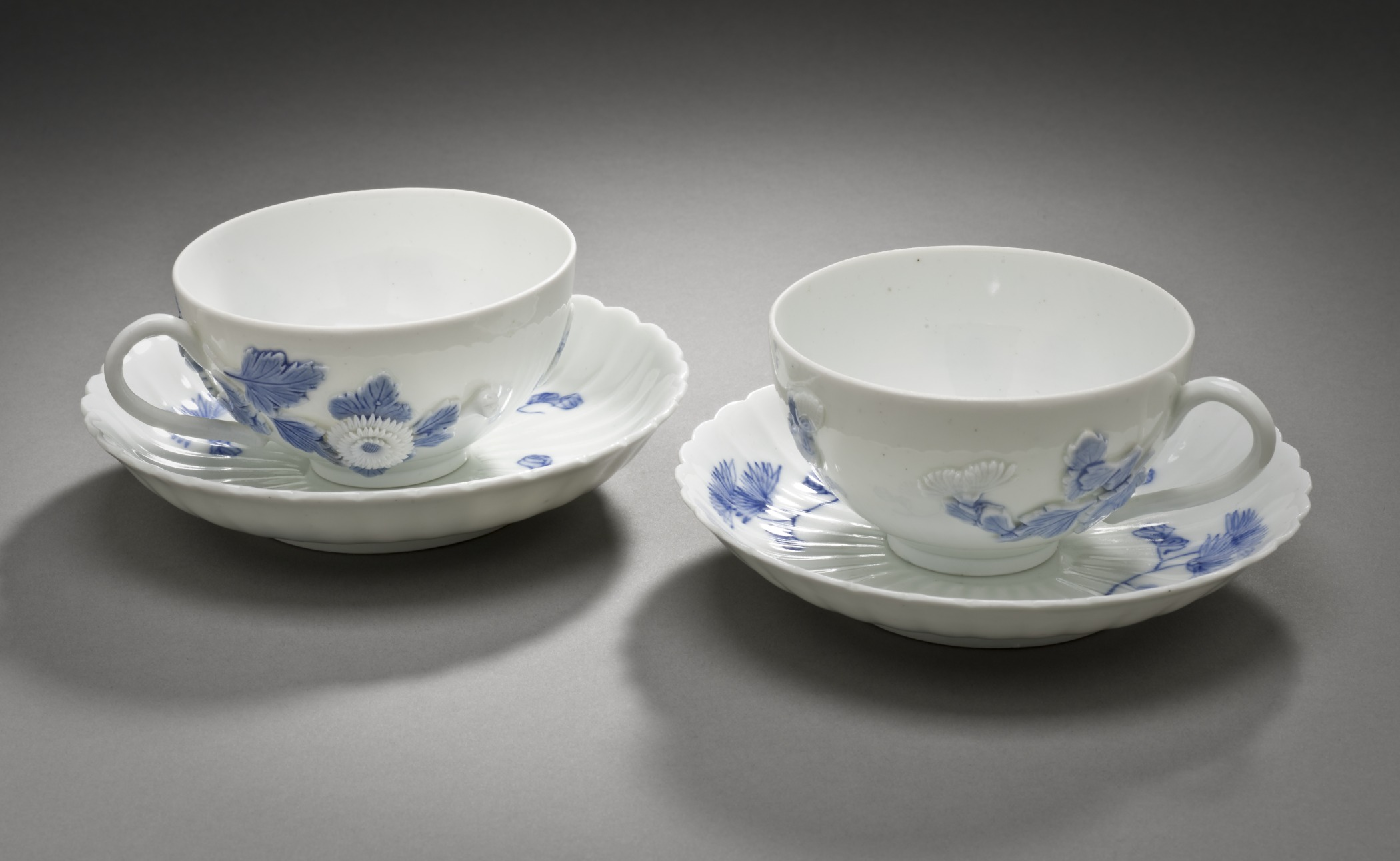
Teacups on matching saucers

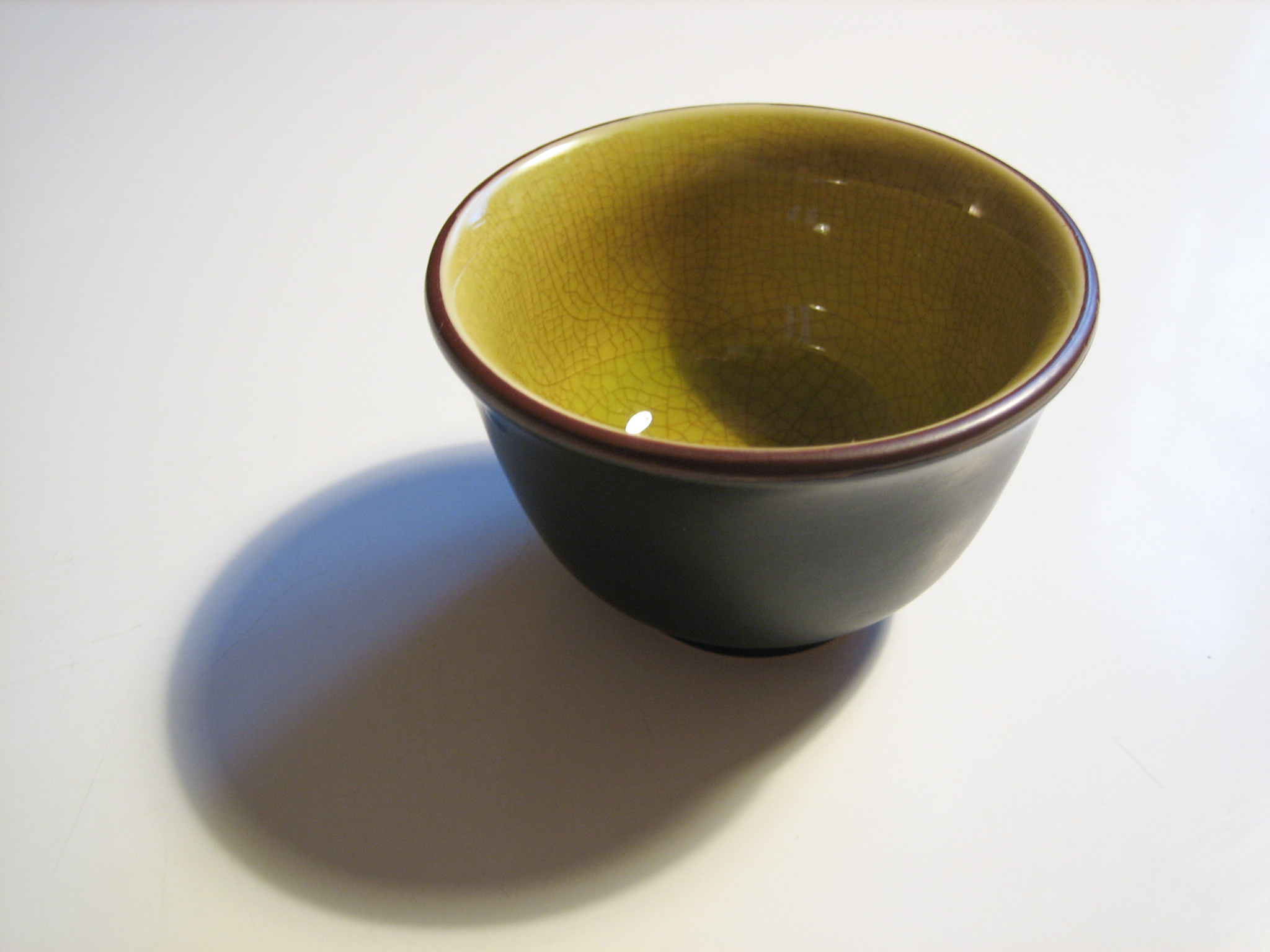
A tea bowl without a handle

A teacup is a cup for drinking tea. It generally has a small handle that may be grasped with the thumb and one or two fingers. It is typically made of a ceramic material and is often part of a set which is composed of a cup and a matching saucer or a trio that includes a small cake or sandwich plate. These may be part of a tea set combined with a teapot, cream jug, covered sugar bowl, and slop bowl. Teacups are often wider and shorter than coffee cups. Cups for morning tea are conventionally larger than cups for afternoon tea.

Higher quality teacups are typically made of fine white translucent porcelain and decorated with patterns. Some collectors acquire numerous one-of-a-kind cups with matching saucers. Such decorative cups may be souvenirs of a location, person, or event.

In Europe, fine porcelain tea cups, such as French Limoges porcelain from a kaolin base heated in ovens or Chinese porcelain, were a luxury for enjoying tea time. These cups are made with a handle and are paired with a saucer in a set and often feature hand painted decoration and gold or silver patterns, especially lining the rim and the handle.

In the Chinese culture teacups are very small and hold between 20 and 50 ml of liquid. They are designed to be used with Yixing teapots or Gaiwan. In Russian-speaking and West Asian cultures influenced by the Ottoman Empire tea is often served in a faceted glass held in a separate metal container with a handle, called a zarf in Turkish and Arabic, the podstakannik being its Russian cousin.

== History ==
The teacup and saucer originated in China at the time of the near-simultaneous introduction of tea and porcelain. The original teacup design did not have a handle or a saucer. At some point a ring-shaped cupholder appeared to protect the fingers and eventually evolved into a saucer. The cups in 17th century were tiny, with the width about 2¼ inches across at the top,1¼ at the bottom, and the depth of 1½ inches. The saucers measured 4½ inches across. The European manufacturers initially copied the handle-less Oriental designs exported from the Japanese port of Imari or from the southern Chinese port of Canton (part of the Canton System, 1757-1842), now Guangzhou. The teacup handles were introduced in the West in the early 19th century. The handles originally became a feature of chocolate drinking cups in the 17th century, while teacups were still handle-less.

Teacup plates originated in England in the early 1800s and provided a rest for the cup and a space for a light snack.

== Culture ==
A small-scale research was done by Yang et al. in 2019 to test the influence of the teacup shape on the expert evaluation of the tea taste. Significant variations were found, lending some support to the "you eat with your eyes" concept.

Unicode codepoints U+1F375 🍵 TEACUP WITHOUT HANDLE and U+26FE ⛾ CUP ON BLACK SQUARE portray a teacup. U+2615 ☕ HOT BEVERAGE is often rendered as a teacup.

== See also ==
- "A Nice Cup of Tea"
- Gill (unit)
- Moustache cup
- Mug
- Saucer
- Tea culture

== Sources ==
- Ukers, William Harrison (1935). "Evolution of tea-making appliances". All about Tea, Volume 2. Tea and coffee trade journal Company. pp. 436–448. OCLC 1201914.
- Yang, Su-Chiu; Peng, Li-Hsun; Hsu, Li-Chieh (4 December 2019). "The Influence of Teacup Shape on the Cognitive Perception of Tea, and the Sustainability Value of the Aesthetic and Practical Design of a Teacup". Sustainability. 11 (24): 6895. Bibcode:2019Sust...11.6895Y. doi:10.3390/su11246895. eISSN 2071-1050.
- Jamieson, R. W. (1 December 2001). "The Essence of Commodification: Caffeine Dependencies in the Early Modern World" (PDF). Journal of Social History. 35 (2): 269–294. doi:10.1353/jsh.2001.0125. eISSN 1527-1897. ISSN 0022-4529. PMID 18546583. S2CID 22532559. Archived from the original (PDF) on 4 February 2023.\
- Schifferstein, Hendrik N.J. (April 2009). "The drinking experience: Cup or content?" (PDF). Food Quality and Preference. 20 (3): 268–276. doi:10.1016/j.foodqual.2008.11.003. ISSN 0950-3293.
