= Coffee cup sleeve =

Sleeve that insulates hand from hot drink

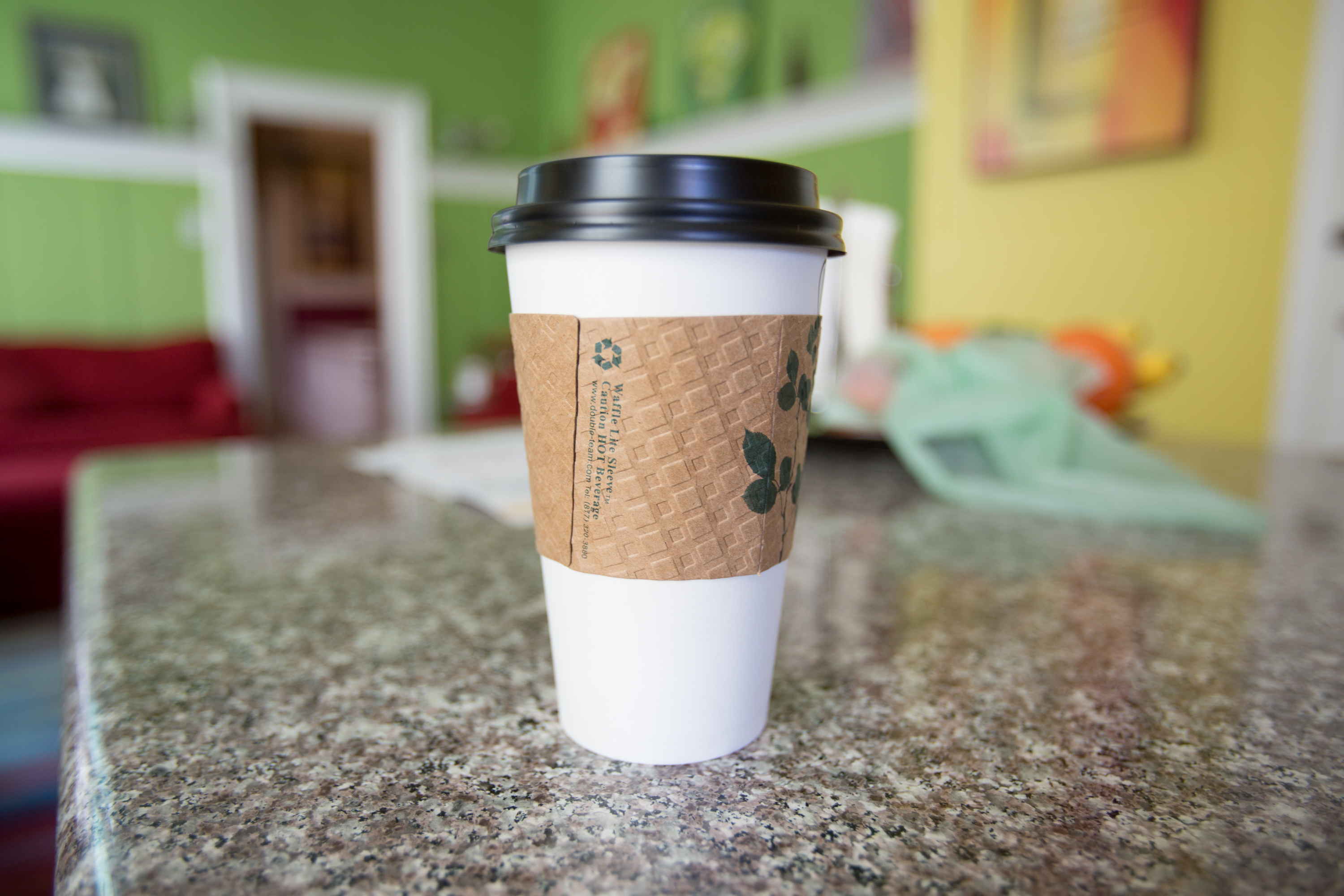
Coffee cup sleeve on a coffee cup. The sleeve makes it easy to hold hot drinks.

Coffee cup sleeves, also known as coffee sleeves, (Note: Other names include coffee clutches, coffee cozies, hot cup jackets, paper zarfs, coffee collars, and cup holders.) are roughly cylindrical sleeves that fit tightly over handle-less paper coffee cups to insulate the drinker's hands from hot coffee. Coffee sleeves are typically made of textured paperboard, but can be found made of other materials. Coffee sleeves allow coffee houses, fast food restaurants, and other vendors to avoid double-cupping, the practice of using two (or more) nested paper cups for a single hot beverage. Some paper cup holders carry advertisements.

The coffee sleeve was invented in 1991 by Jay Sorensen and patented in 1995 (under the trademarked name Java Jacket), and are now commonly utilized by coffee houses and other vendors that sell hot beverages dispensed in disposable paper cups. There are a number of patents that cover various coffee sleeves and their aspects. This includes the Coffee Clutch, which is used by Starbucks. Other people have claimed to invent the coffee sleeve.

There are a number of companies that manufacture coffee sleeves; the top four companies by volume of coffee sleeves sold in the U.S. are, in no particular order, International Paper, LBP Manufacturing, Java Jacket, and Labansat & Schulz Manufacturing.

The sleeve was invented while Sorensen was driving his daughter Ryeder to school and spilled a cup of coffee in his lap. The Java Jacket first appeared at the Seattle Coffeefest in 1995 and Sorensen and his wife Colleen were overwhelmed with requests and orders to fill.

Coffee cup sleeves can be customized by having logos or brands printed directly on the sleeves. Many coffee shops have custom printed coffee sleeves.

Coffee sleeves should not be confused with fixed cup holders.

== See also ==
- Drink carrier
- Koozie
- Tea cosy
- Zarf
