= Cup of Joe =

Cup of Joe may refer to:

- "cup of joe", "cup of Joe", or, "Cup of Joe", an American expression meaning a cup of coffee (the beverage)
- Cup of Joe (TV series), a 2020 television series on Quibi
- "A Cup of Joe", a 1993 episode of the American television show Northern Exposure
- Cup of Joe (band), a Filipino pop/rock band

== See also ==
- Cup of Jo, a New York-based lifestyle, fashion, design, and parenting blog
- Cuppa Joe, a fictional element from Mighty Magiswords; see List of Mighty Magiswords episodes
- Cup of Coffee (disambiguation)
