= Tasse à café =

Cup for serving coffee

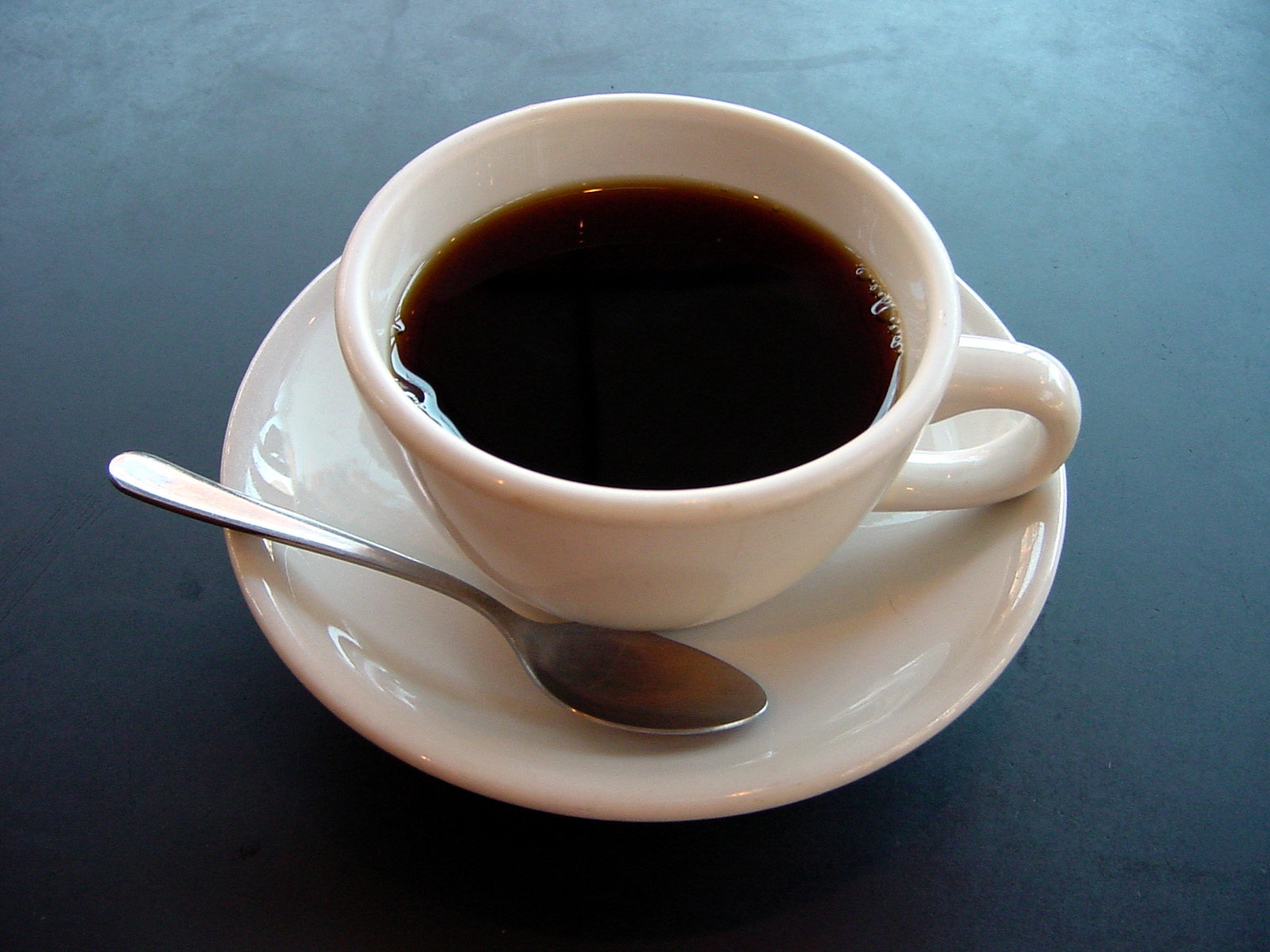
A tasse filled with coffee

A tasse à café (French pronunciation: [tɑs‿a kafe], coffee cup) is a cup, generally of white porcelain and of around 120 ml (4 fl oz), in which coffee is served. It is also sometimes used to serve small portions of rich drinks, such as hot chocolate.

The word originates from Arabic: طاس, romanized: ṭās, from the Persian: طاس, romanized: ṭās, meaning cup or bowl. A half-sized cup is called a demi-tasse (English demitasse), literally "half-cup".

== See also ==
- Demitasse
- Mug
