= Coffee cup =

Tableware product

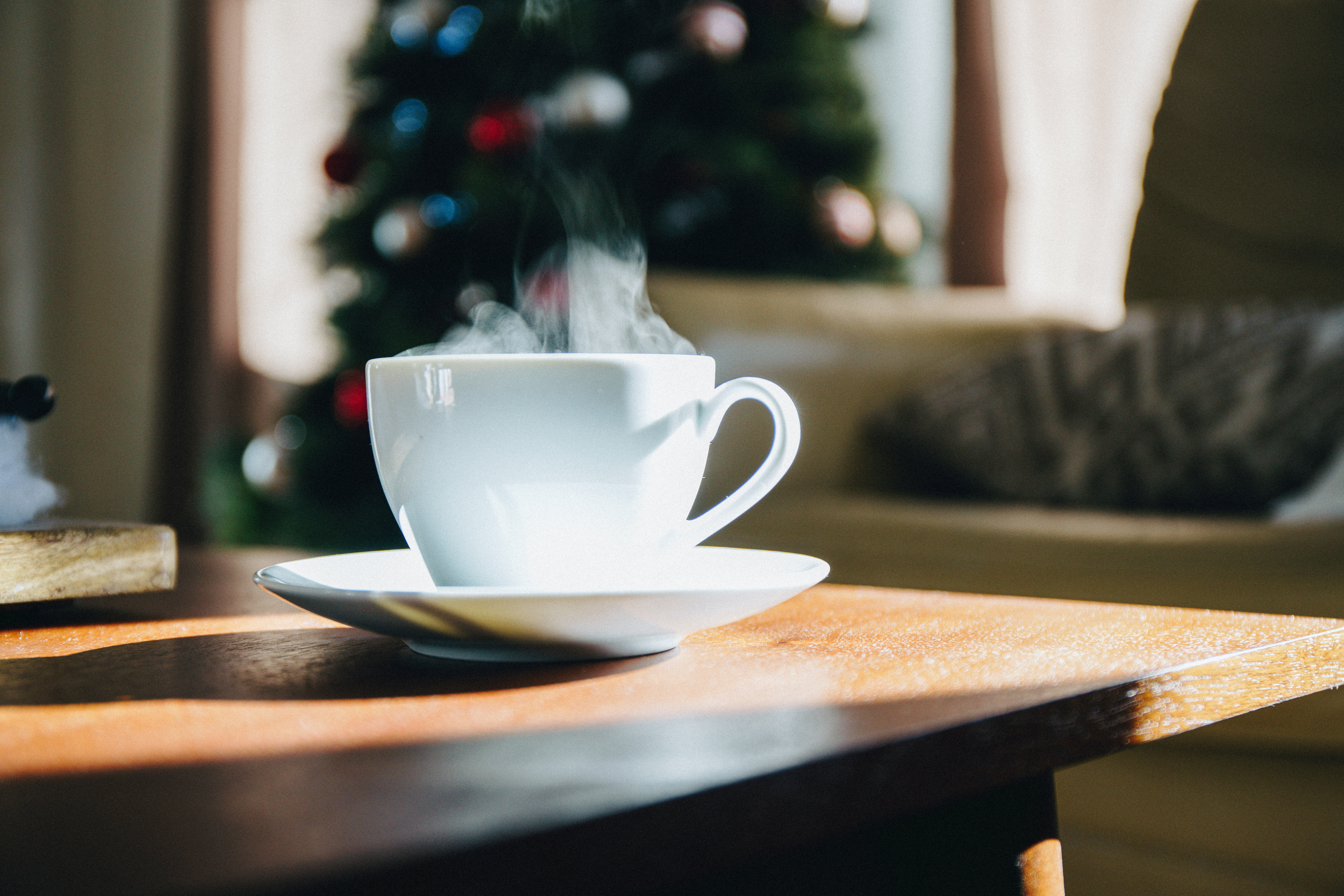
A coffee cup and saucer

A coffee cup is a cup for serving coffee and coffee-based drinks. There are three major types: conventional cups used with saucers, mugs used without saucers, and disposable cups. Cups and mugs generally have a handle. Disposable paper cups used for take-out sometimes have fold-out handles, but are more often used with an insulating coffee cup sleeve.

Coffee cups and mugs may be made of glazed ceramic, porcelain, plastic, glass, insulated or uninsulated metal, and other materials. In the past, coffee cups have also been made of bone, clay, and wood. Disposable coffee cups may be made out of paper or polystyrene foam (often mistakenly called Styrofoam).

== History ==
Coffee cups, along with other coffee ware, originated in the Middle East. In the 17th century, coffee was consumed from small handle-less bowls, "Greek cups". The cups were Chinese export porcelain or its Japanese equivalent; the same cups were used for coffee and tea. In Europe, Meissen porcelain cups appeared around 1710, with large exports of "Greek cups" to Greece in the 1730s. These cups were tall due to the habit of drinking the liquid layer at the top, with the preparation sediment left at the bottom. As the drip coffee, invented in France in the 18th century, gained popularity, the need for tall cups disappeared, so Sèvres porcelain pioneered shorter cups.

Handles first appeared on the Meissen tall cups in the 1710s (some Oriental cups had handles, but these were made from silver). Handles became common by the 1730s. By the early 18th century, the European taste for handles on cups, strongly evident from antiquity, reasserted itself and a single vertical handle was added to a slightly more upright Chinese-style bowl to create both the very similar forms of the Western teacup and coffee cup, as well as a saucer. This was initially rather deeper than modern saucers as, at least for tea, it was considered usual to pour the hot liquid into the saucer to cool it slightly before drinking. Apart from a more shallow saucer the essential elements of these two forms in many contemporary examples have changed little since the mid-18th century. European porcelain manufacturers encouraged the development of different sizes of cup, and shapes of pot, for tea and coffee services.

== Shapes and sizes ==
=== Espresso ===
The Italian Espresso National Institute recommends serving espresso in a white china cup holding 50−100 ml, usually served on a saucer. Espresso cups are sometimes called demitasse cups. The espresso macchiato, made with a shot of espresso and a dash of steamed milk, is also served in a demitasse.

=== Cappuccino ===
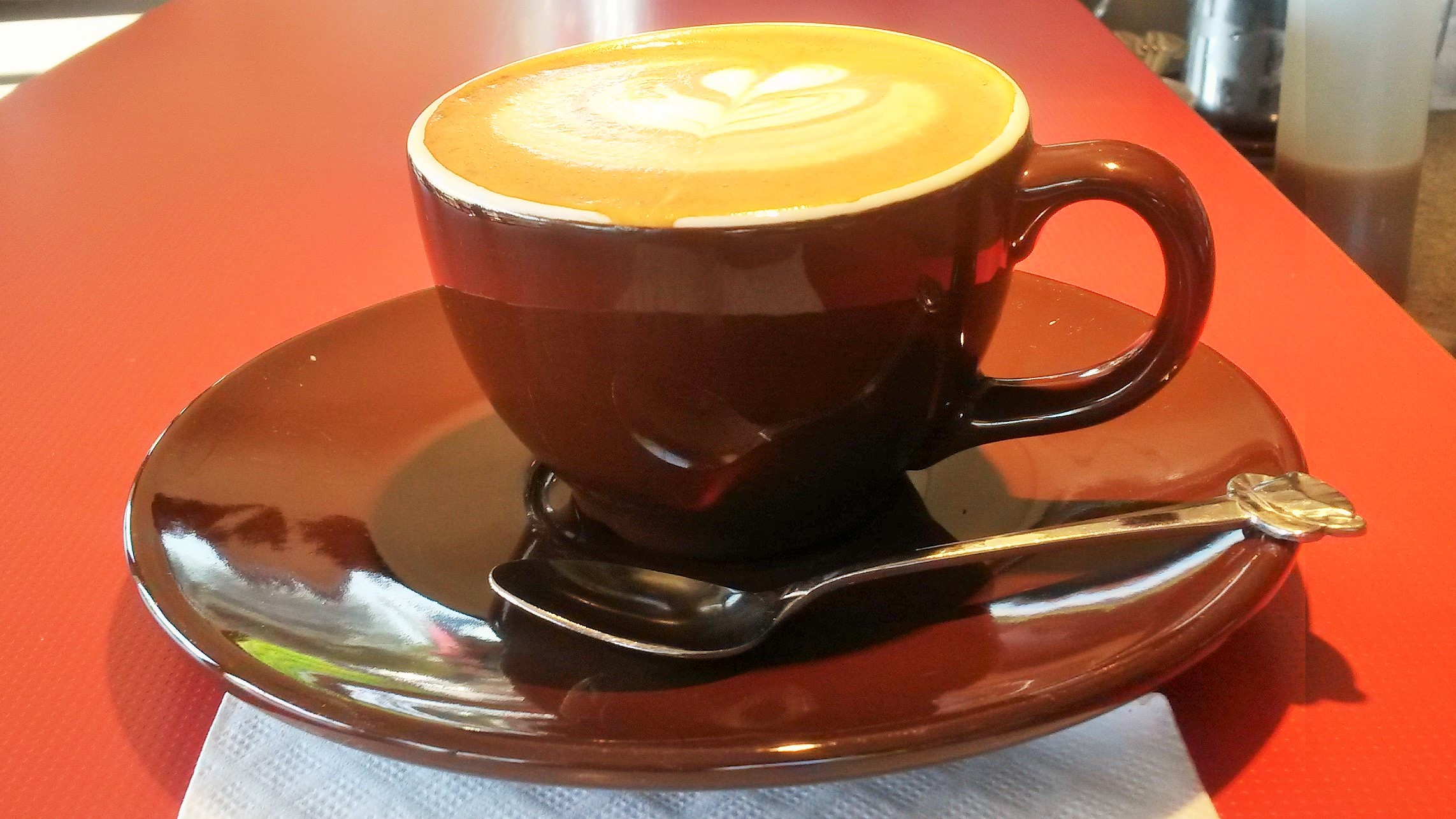
Traditional 6 oz cappuccino served in a ceramic cup, on a saucer, with a spoon and napkin

The Italian Espresso National Institute recommends serving cappuccino in a china cup holding approximately 160 ml, usually served on a saucer.

=== Coffee can ===
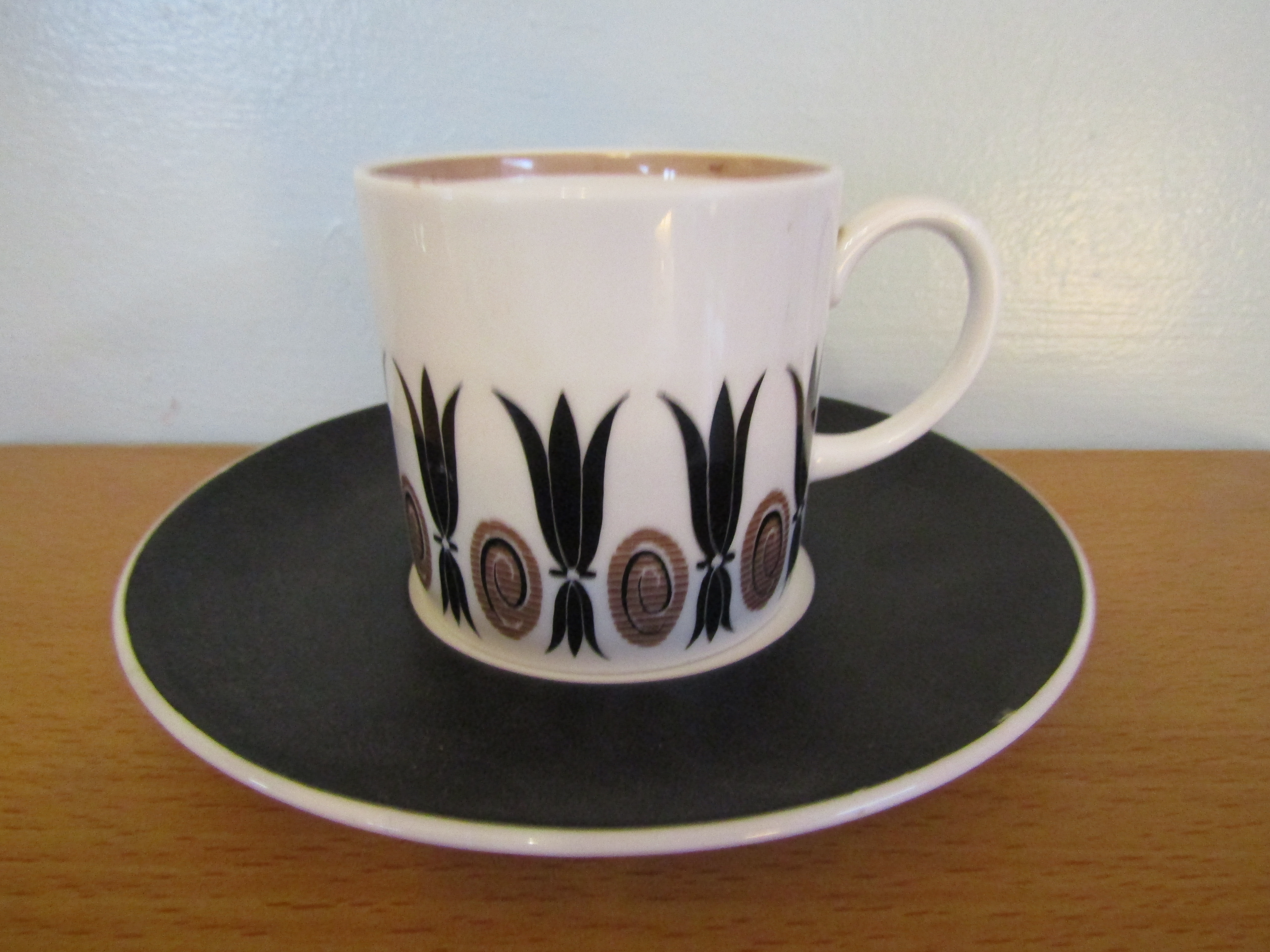
Coffee can and saucer, Wedgwood ΄Corinthian΄, Susie Cooper design

At least in the trade, a small straight-sided coffee cup, like a miniature mug but with a matching saucer, is called a coffee can or "coffee-can". The shape may have a flared profile, but usually not curving. These are typically about 2.5 inches high, and used in porcelain coffee services for relatively formal dinner-parties, or in expensive restaurants. They do not stack well, which probably has prevented their widespread use in cafes, despite often being a suitable size for an espresso. The shape has been used since the late 18th century, when it was introduced by Sèvres porcelain.

=== Gibraltar or cortado ===
Some shops serve a cortado in a 4-ounce Libbey Gibraltar glass, calling the drink a Gibraltar.

=== Sini ===
Traditional Ethiopian cups are called sini. These are small, pottery or porcelain cups, slightly larger than a demitasse, used to serve coffee from a jebena.

=== Cafe drinkware ===
Cafes use various sizes of coffee cups to serve mochas, lattes, and other coffee drinks. They are typically 225, 336, 460, and sometimes 570 ml. These cups are made of porcelain and shaped to encourage and aid in creating latte art.

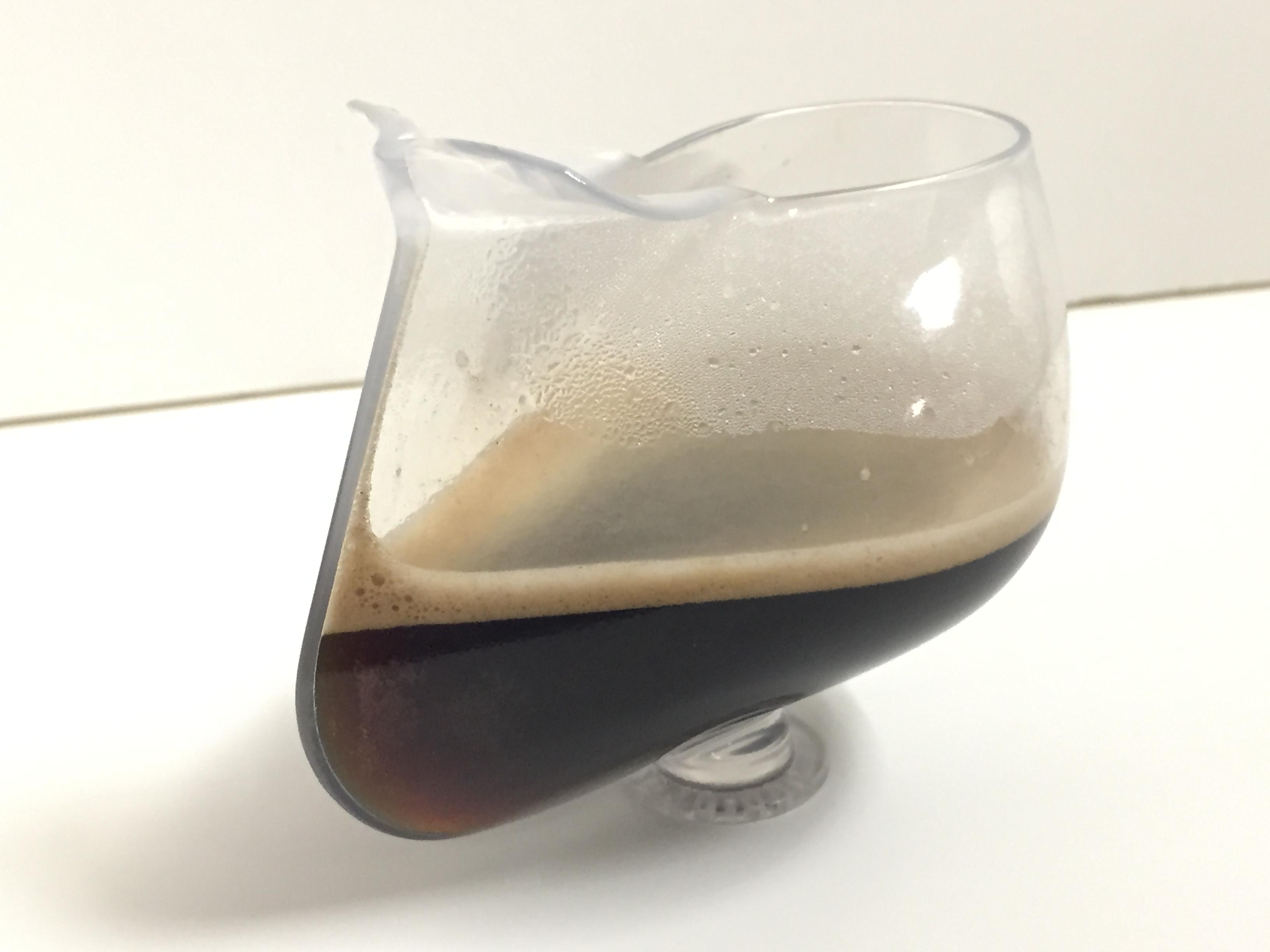
Capillary Cup for use in zero-gravity

=== Zero-gravity sipping ===
NASA designed "Space Cups" or "Capillary Cups" for use by astronauts in the International Space Station. Astronaut Don Pettit hand-made the first prototype in an effort to simulate the coffee-drinking on earth whilst in a zero-gravity environment. The sharp inner corner of the Space Cup allows the liquid to flow toward the drinker's lips through capillary flow. Data from experiments conducted with Space Cups can be used to design better fluid systems used in space, such as toilets, oxygen, air conditioning, and water coolants. The data can also be applied to societal uses of fluid systems on Earth, such as improving the design of portable medical blood testers for infectious diseases.

== Materials ==
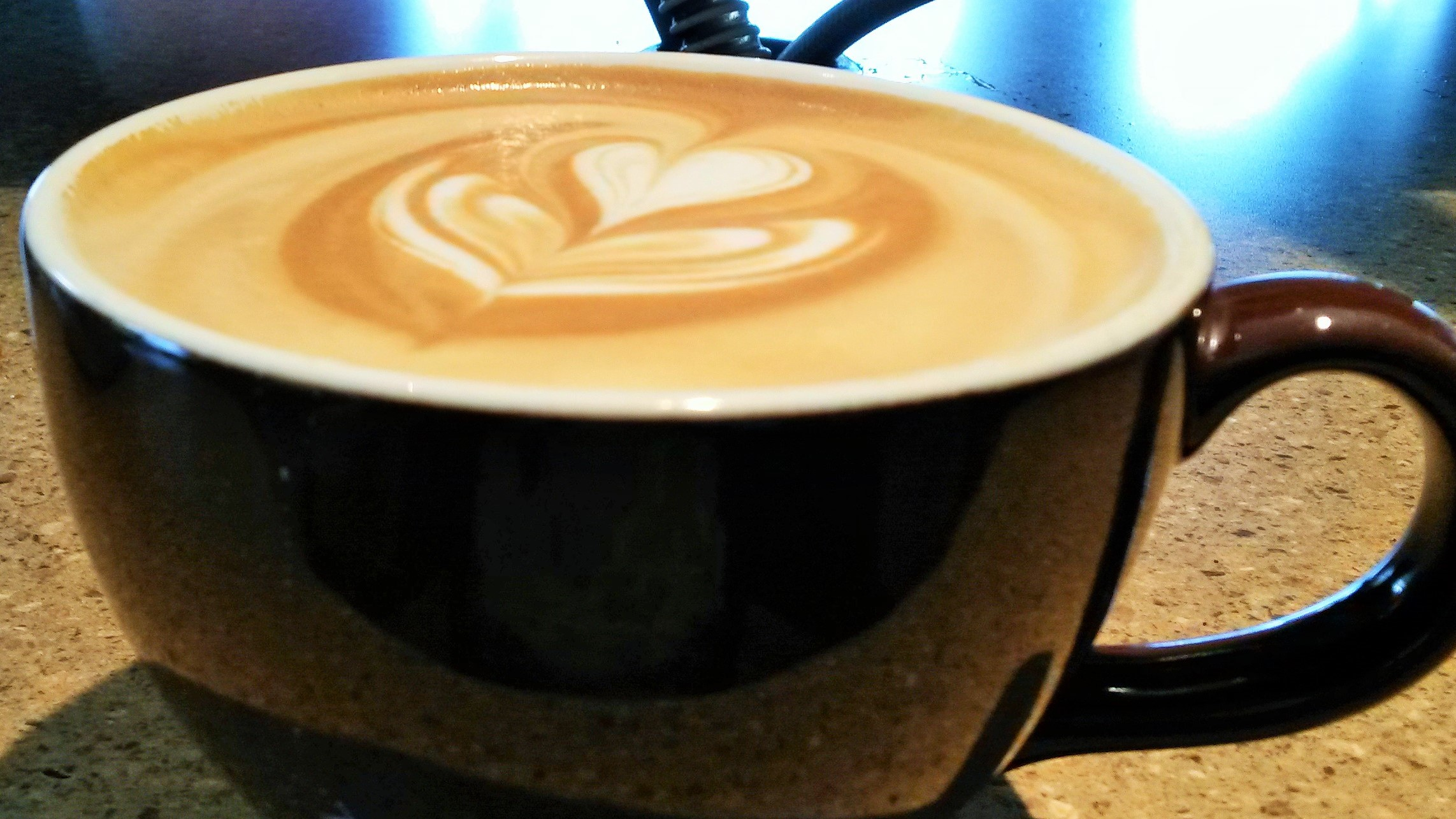
Latte with latte art in a 12 oz ceramic cup

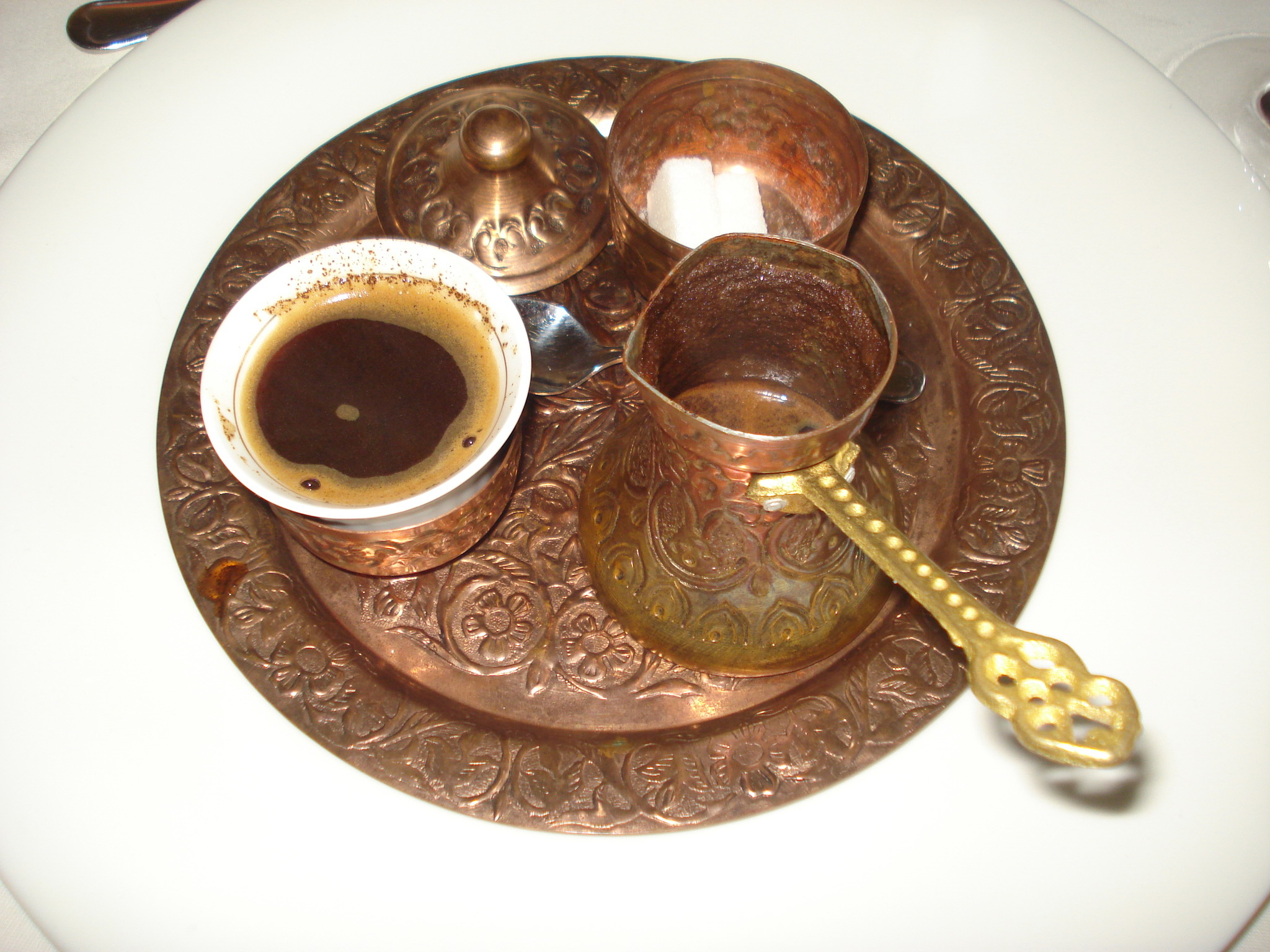
Turkish coffee set containing a coffee cup (fildjan), a coffee pot (cezve) and a sugar bowl, as traditionally served in Bosnia and Herzegovina

=== Porcelain and ceramic ===
Porcelain, bone china, glass and other ceramics are widely used for coffee cups and mugs.

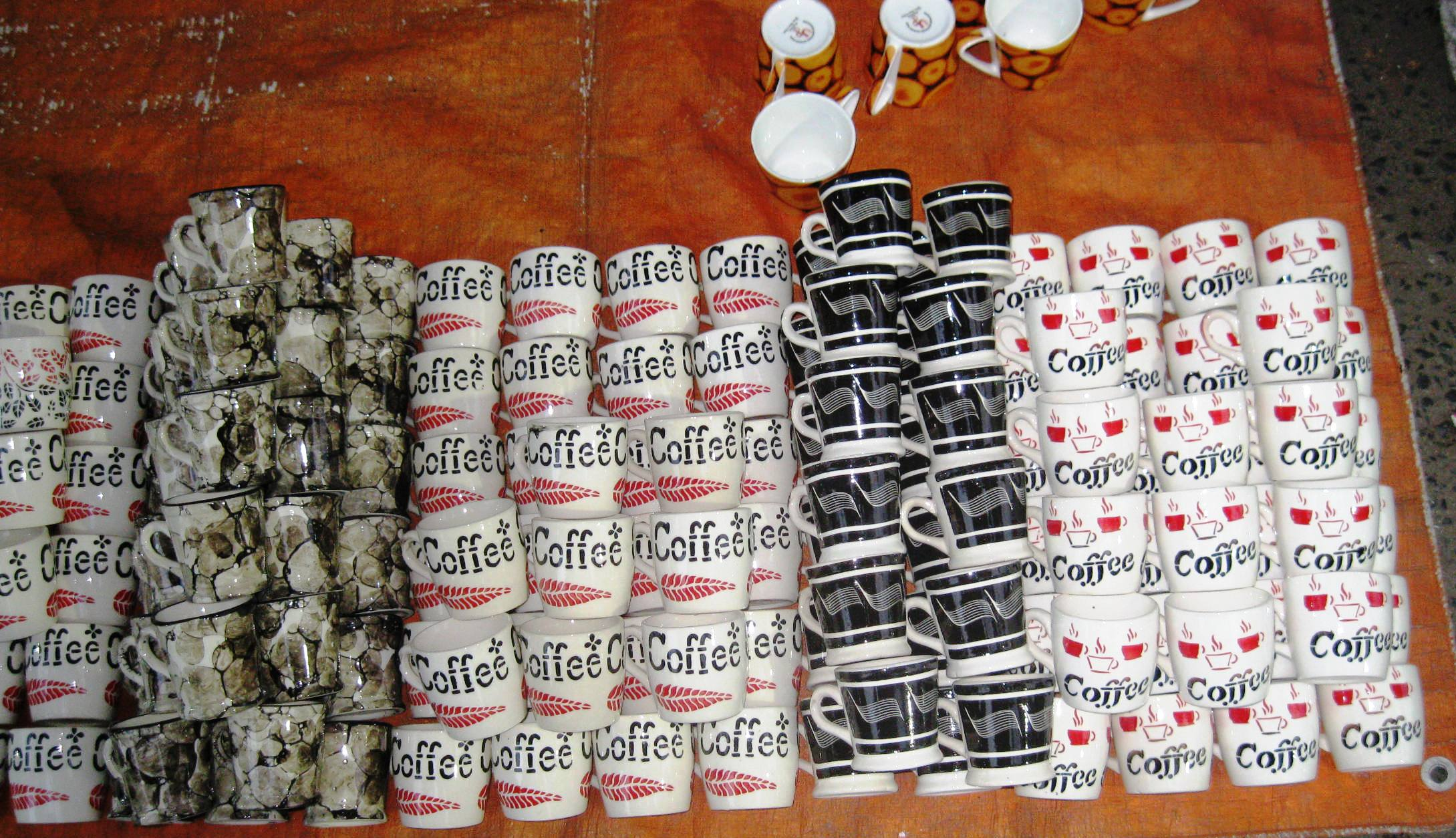
Coffee cups selling on Indian Street, Kolkata, West Bengal, India

=== Paper ===
Paper cups are usually lined with wax or plastic to prevent leakage. A famous design of a paper coffee cup is the Anthora, which has become symbolic of New York City's daily life.

=== Bamboo ===
Reusable bamboo coffee cups, promoted as a "natural" product, are made of powdered bamboo fibres suspended in glue containing melamine and formaldehyde. The German consumer group Stiftung Warentest raised concerns that these substances constitute a health hazard when used for hot drinks. The cups are also not recyclable. The UK Food Standards Agency advised retailers in June 2023 to withdraw bamboo cups, making further sales unlawful.

=== Polystyrene ===
Polystyrene, sometimes known as styrofoam (not actually Styrofoam), is used mainly because of its insulating abilities.

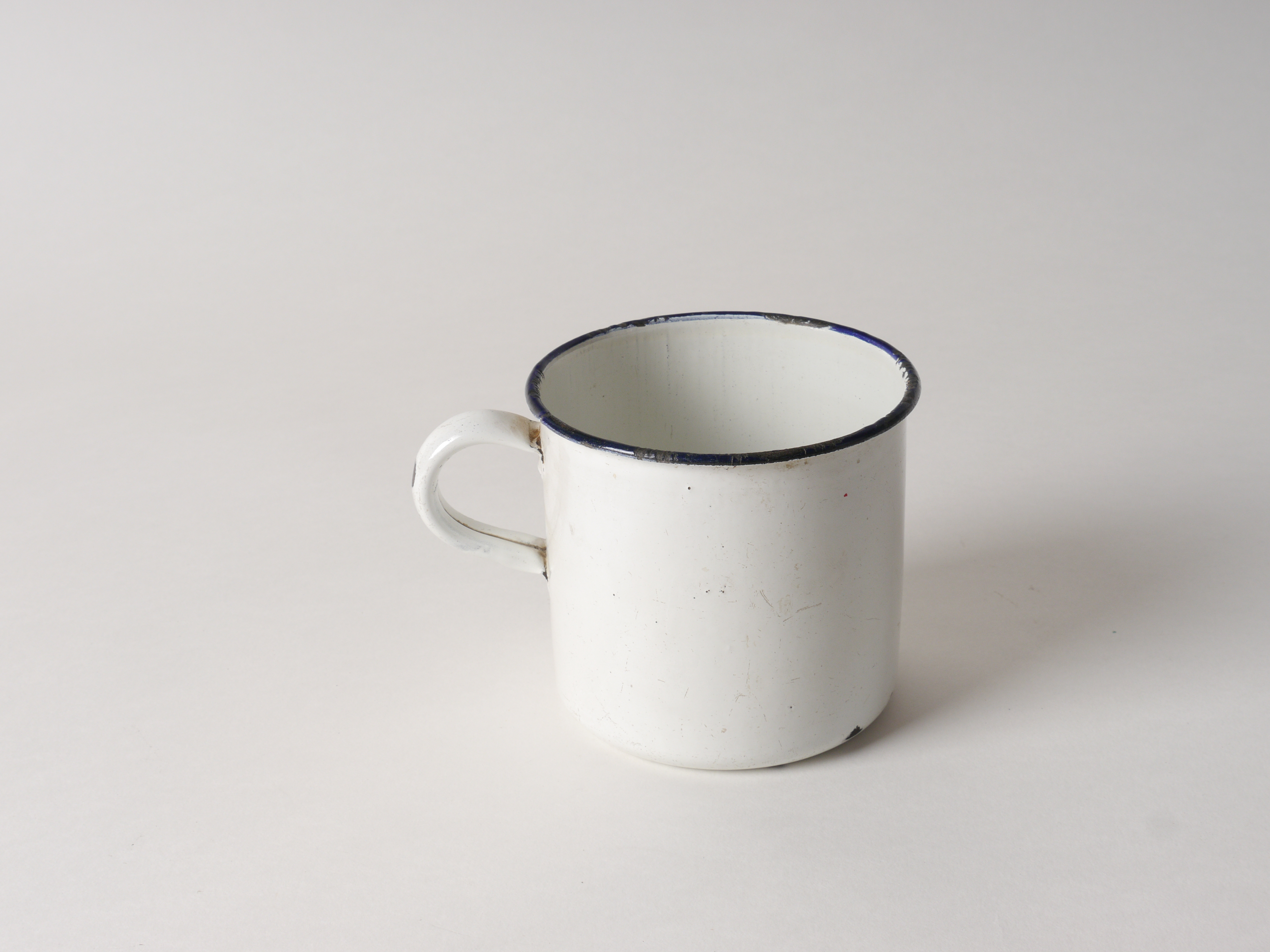
Enamelled coffee cup - Collection Museum of Industry Ghent

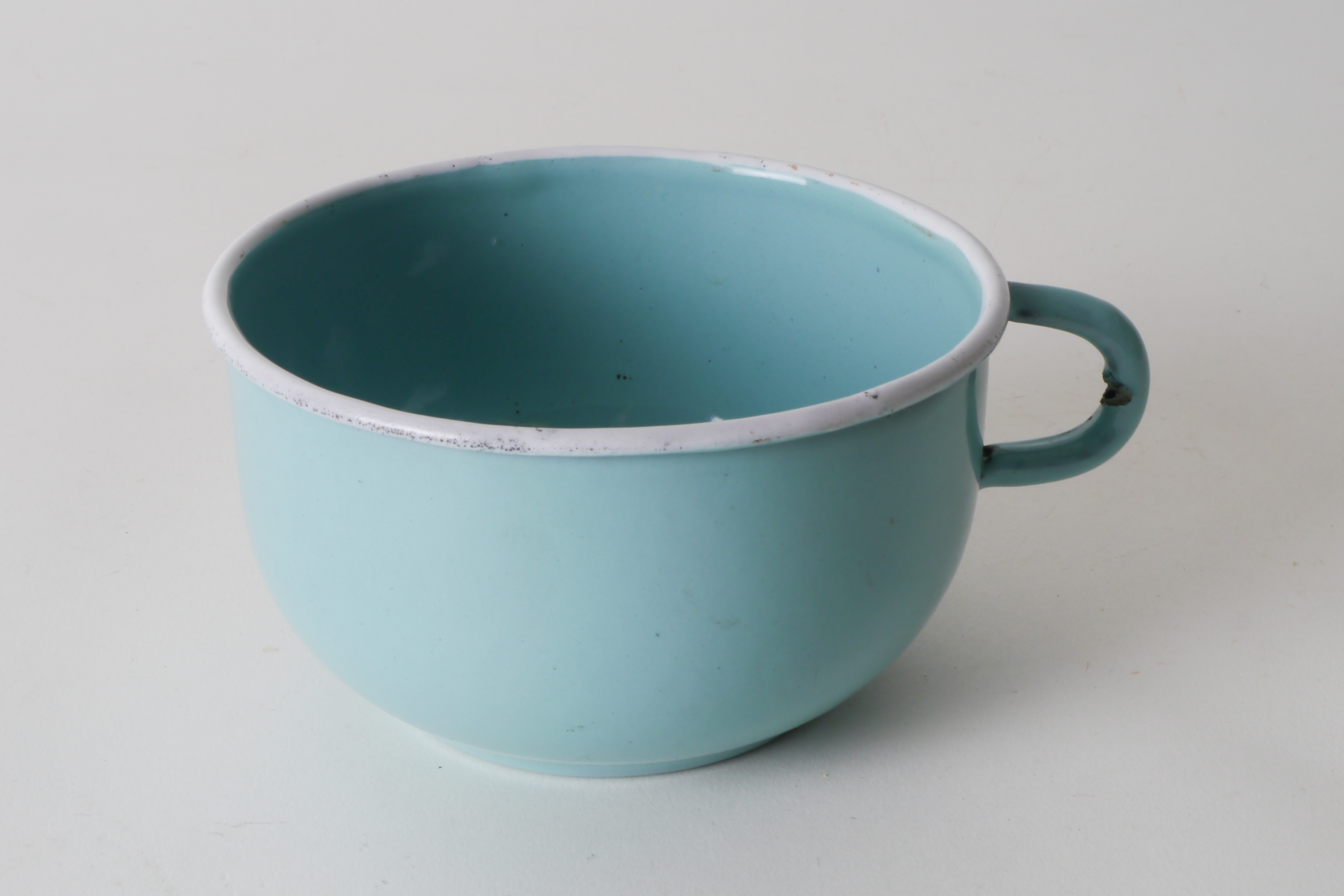
Enamelled coffee cup - Collection Museum of Industry Ghent

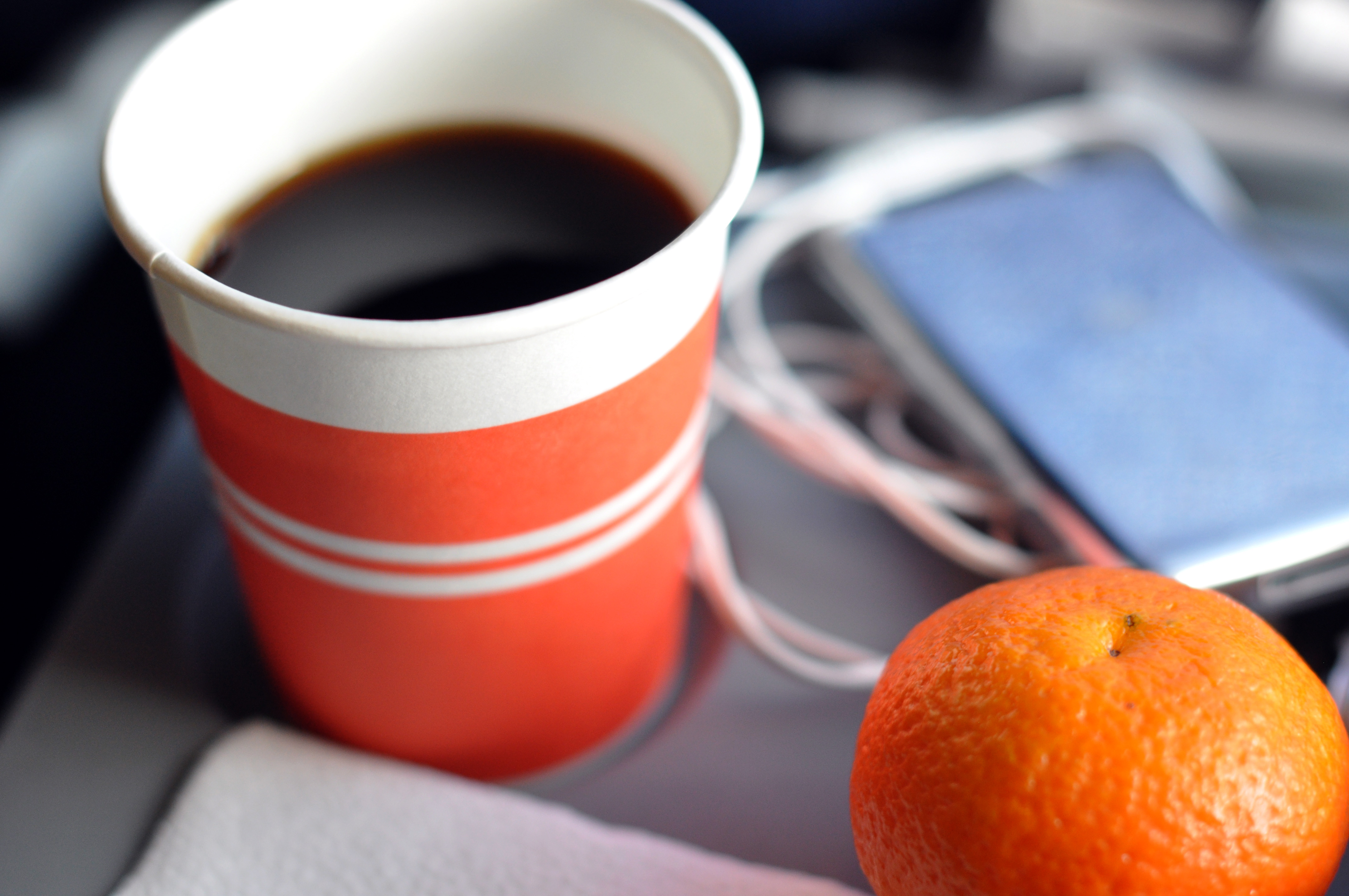
A paper coffee cup

== Accessories ==
=== Coffee cup lids ===
Usually made of plastic, the first patent for a coffee cup lid design was filed in 1967 and focused on creating a tight seal between the cup and the lid to reduce leaking and a vent hole to allow steam to escape. This early lid had no opening for drinking, and the consumer had to tear into it. The 1980s saw a significant increase in patents filed for "drink-through hot beverage lids". In 1986, the Solo Traveler lid was created; it is found in the Museum of Modern Art's 2004 exhibit "Humble Masterpieces". The increased popularity of lattes and similar drinks in the 2000s resulted in the development of elevated lids to accommodate microfoam. Later lid designs like the Viora have improved on Solo Traveler's design, which has too small a vent to allow sufficient air to enter while drinking. The coffee lid market was valued at roughly $180 million in 2009, and an estimated 14 billion lids were sold in the United States that year. Louise Harpman, co-owner of the world's most extensive collection of coffee cup lids and co-author of the book Coffee Lids (Princeton Architectural Press, 2018), suggests that coffee cup lids "represent a major shift in American 'to-go' culture".

=== Coffee cup sleeve ===
Coffee cup sleeves are roughly cylindrical sleeves that fit tightly over handle-less paper coffee cups to insulate the drinker's hands from hot coffee. The coffee sleeve was invented and patented by Jay Sorensen in 1993 and is now commonly utilized by coffee houses and other vendors that sell hot beverages dispensed in disposable paper cups. Coffee sleeves are typically made of textured paperboard, but can be made of different materials.

== Environmental issues with disposable cups ==
The United States uses about 120 billion disposable coffee cups annually, almost all of which end up in landfills. Polystyrene foam cups have the reputation of not being recyclable, non-biodegradable, a major part of marine litter, and has various health risks. It is banned as a food and drink container in several U.S. cities including Portland, Ore., San Francisco, Calif., and Amherst, Mass. The doughnut company and coffeehouse chain Dunkin' Donuts has been criticized for continuing to use styrofoam cups. The company has argued that there is no other material that is as insulated, and has an official statement about their foam cups on their website. However, in 2013 they began phasing in doubled-walled paper cups designed to look like their signature foam cup.

Polystyrene foam cups are easier to recycle than the alternative, paper coffee cups, which are lined with polyethylene to make them impermeable. The few composting facilities which do accept them produce plastic fragments, contaminating the environment, and biodegrading very slowly. Paper coffee cups also release trillions of microplastic nanoparticles per liter into the water during normal use.

=== Reusable cups ===
By 2019, coffee shop customers increasingly used reusable coffee cups as a sustainable option; shops were offering a discount as an incentive. Cups made of bamboo fiber, polypropylene, and other organic materials such as starch and paper pulp were used. Only 1 in 400 single-use cups were recycled in 2017, and media coverage encouraged consumers to look for alternatives. Use of reusable cups declined sharply to reduce the chance of infection with the onset of the COVID pandemic in 2020, and as of 2023 had not returned to previous levels.

== See also ==
- Tea cup
