= Zarf =

Holder for a coffee cup without a handle

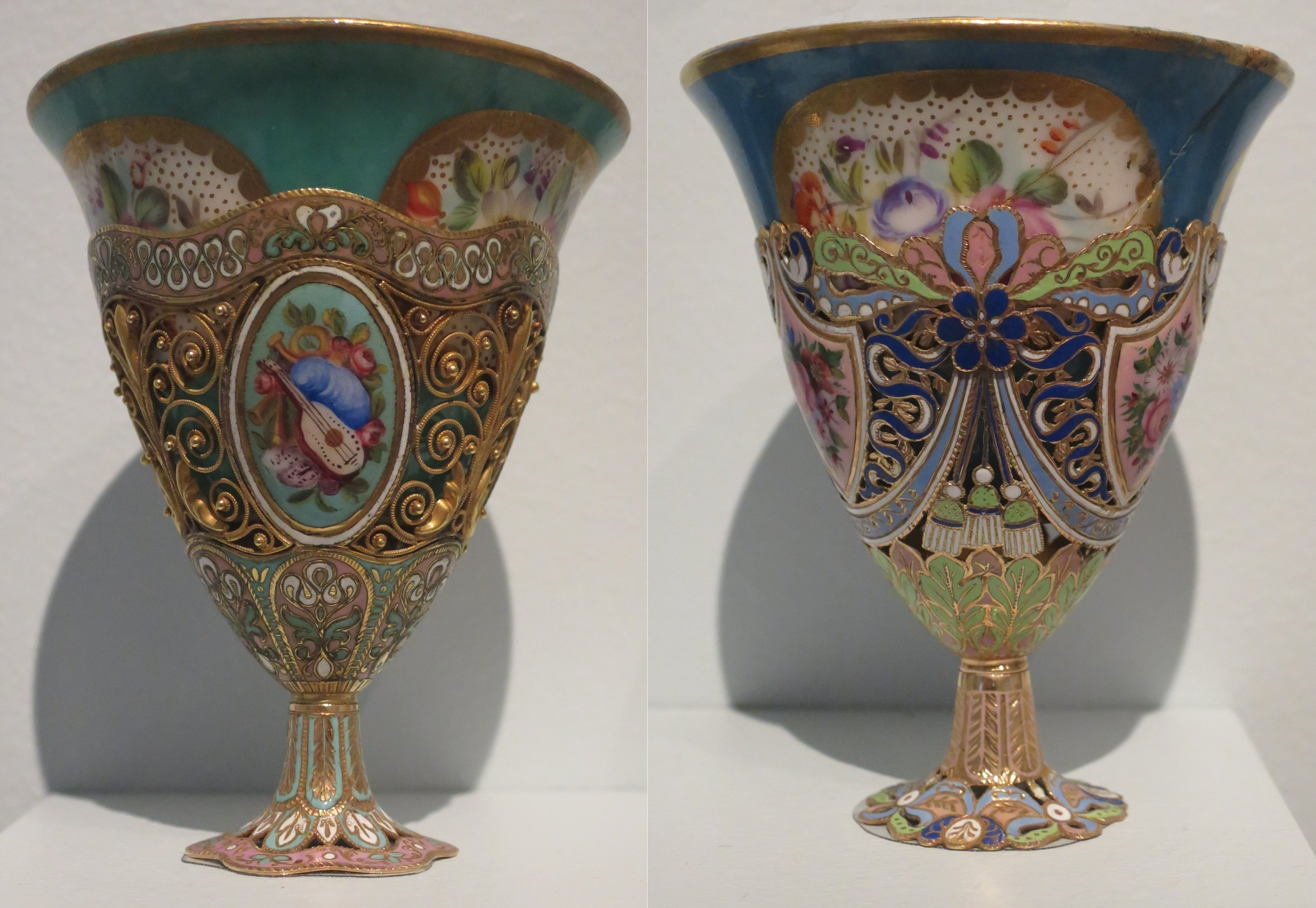
A couple of coffee cups inserted into zarfs (c. 1830, Swiss-made for Turkish market)

A zarf (plural: zarfs, zarves; Turkish: zarflar; Arabic: zuruuf) is a cup holder, usually of ornamented metal, for a coffee cup without a handle (demitasse or fincan).

== History ==
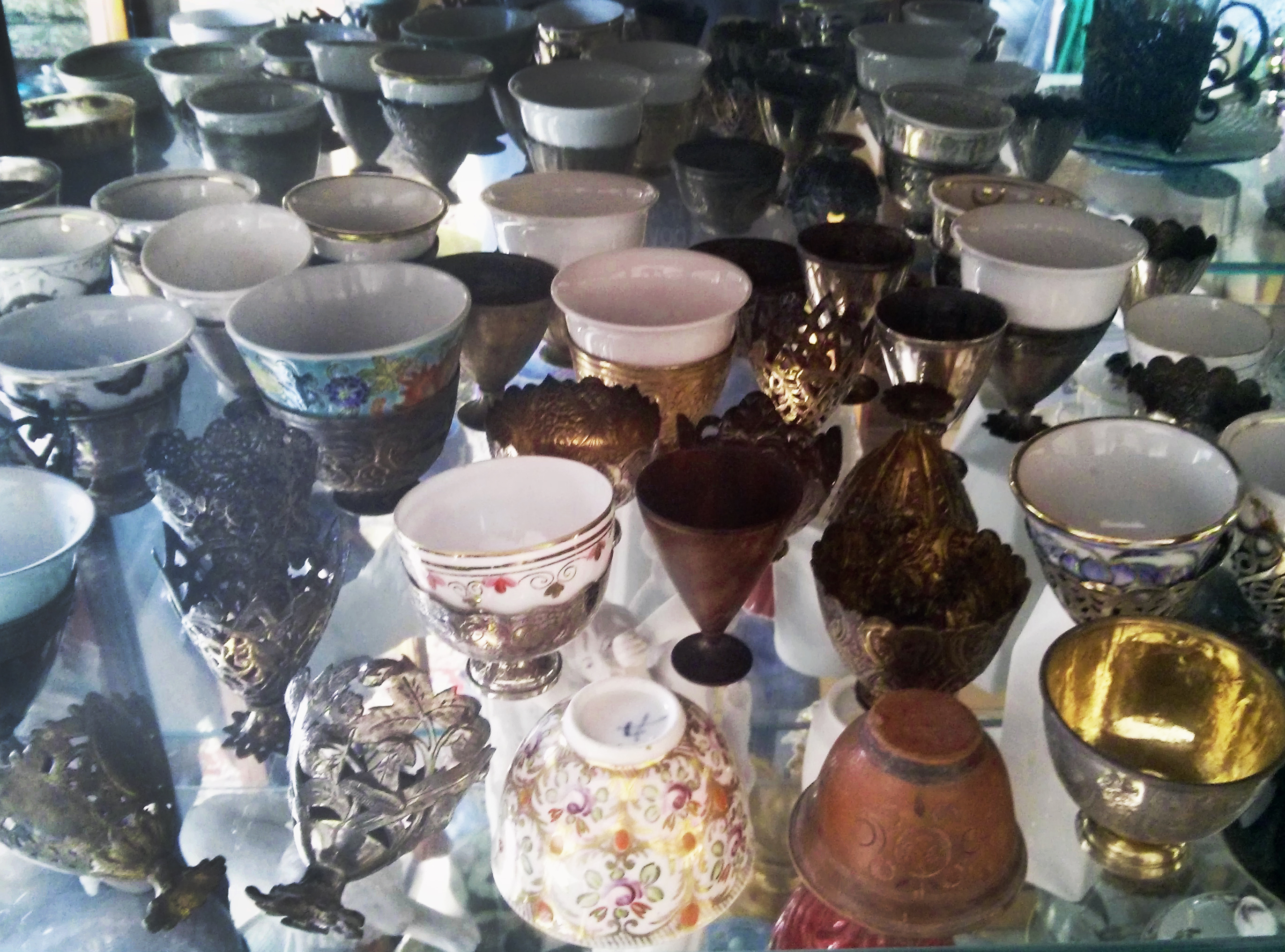
Collection of Ottoman era Turkish coffee zarfs, c. 18th or 19th century

Although coffee was probably discovered in Ethiopia, it was in Turkey around the 13th century that it became popular as a beverage. As with the serving of tea in China and Japan, the serving of coffee in Turkey was a complex, ritualized process. It was served in small cups without handles (known as fincan, pronounced /finˈd͡ʒan/), which were placed in holders known as zarf (from the Arabic: ظرف, romanized: ẓarf; plural ظُرُوف ẓurūf, meaning "container" or "envelope") to protect the cup and also the fingers of the drinker from the hot liquid.

Cups were typically made of porcelain, but also of glass and wood. However, because the holder was more visible, it was typically more heavily ornamented.

When coffee began to be served in cardboard cups in the late 20th century, the zarf became disposable as well. The corrugated coffee cup sleeve was invented in 1991.

== Styles ==
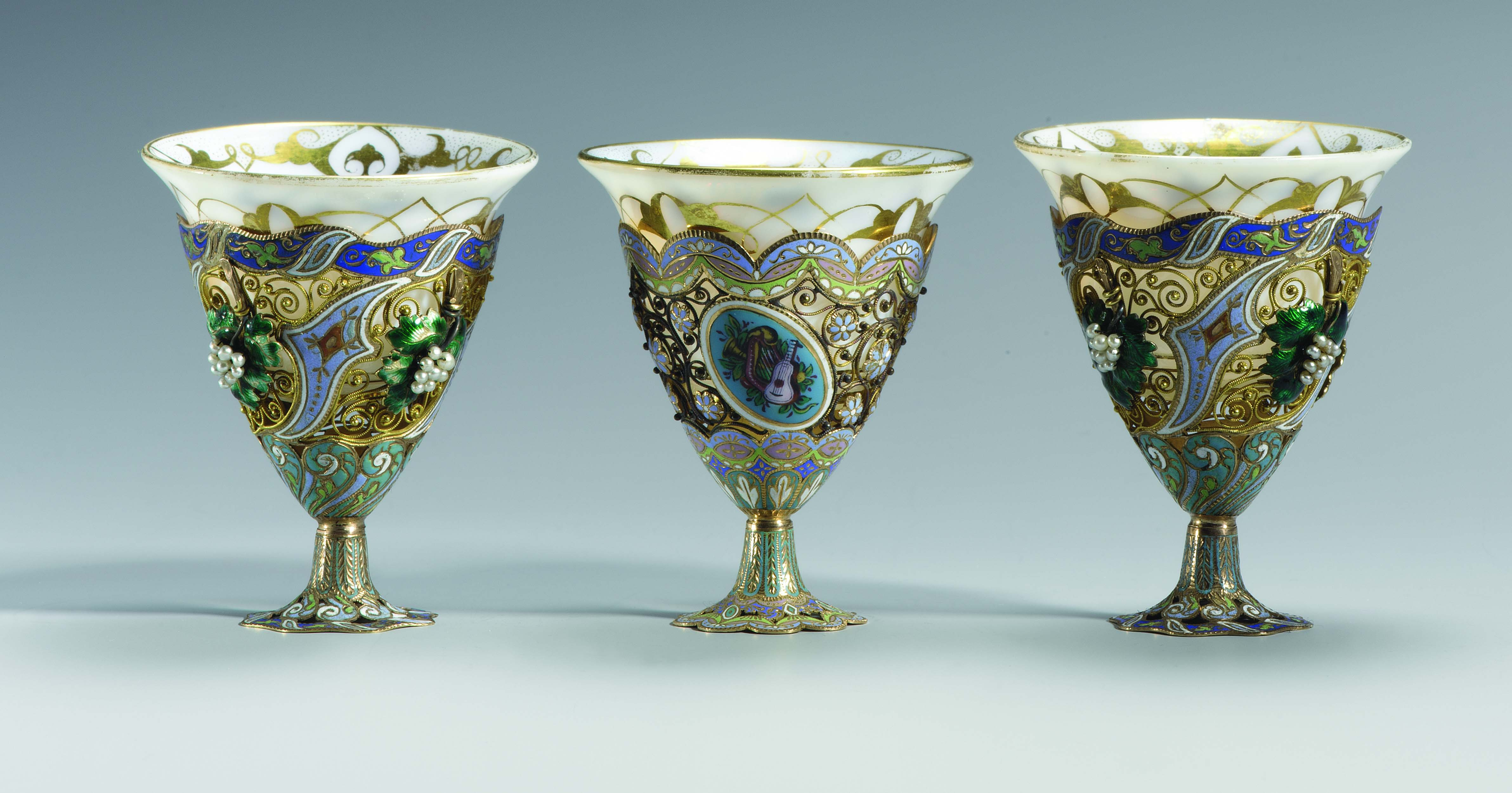
Set of zarfs from 19th century Geneva, now in the Khalili Collection of Enamels of the World

The zarf was often made from metal, with silver, gold, copper, and brass being the most common materials used. Others were also made of woods such as coconut, ebony or other hardwoods, or of ivory, bone, horn, or tortoiseshell. Today, zarf can be the name of a cardboard coffee cup sleeve.

Metal zarfs were sometimes filigreed, decorated with chasing, niello, engraving, or set with precious stones.

Sets of zarfs, decorated with enamel and gems, were popular across the Islamic world. During the 19th century, enamel workshops in Geneva produced large quantities of zarf sets for this market. These were decorated with brightly coloured enamel and motifs that included musical instruments or military trophies.

Wooden zarfs, of which very few remain, were favored because of the natural aroma of the wood from which they were fashioned. They were very fragile.

Tortoiseshell, horn and ivory zarfs required special skill to make. In the first two cases, sheets of the material in question were softened in hot water and then clamped in a mold to create the required shape. Ivory was carved in the same way as wood; however, its greater value meant that more care was needed to avoid mistakes.

== See also ==
- Coffee cup sleeve
- Cup holder
- Podstakannik
