= Cup holder =

Device to hold a cup or other drinking vessel

A cup holder is a device, such as a podstakannik (Russian) or zarf (Turkish), to hold a cup or other drinking vessel. It may be free standing to hold cups securely on a desk or other flat surface, or in a tree style to store sets of cups in kitchens. They may be built into automobiles or chairs, or fixed to the walls of airplanes, boats, buses and trains.

== Automobile cup holder ==
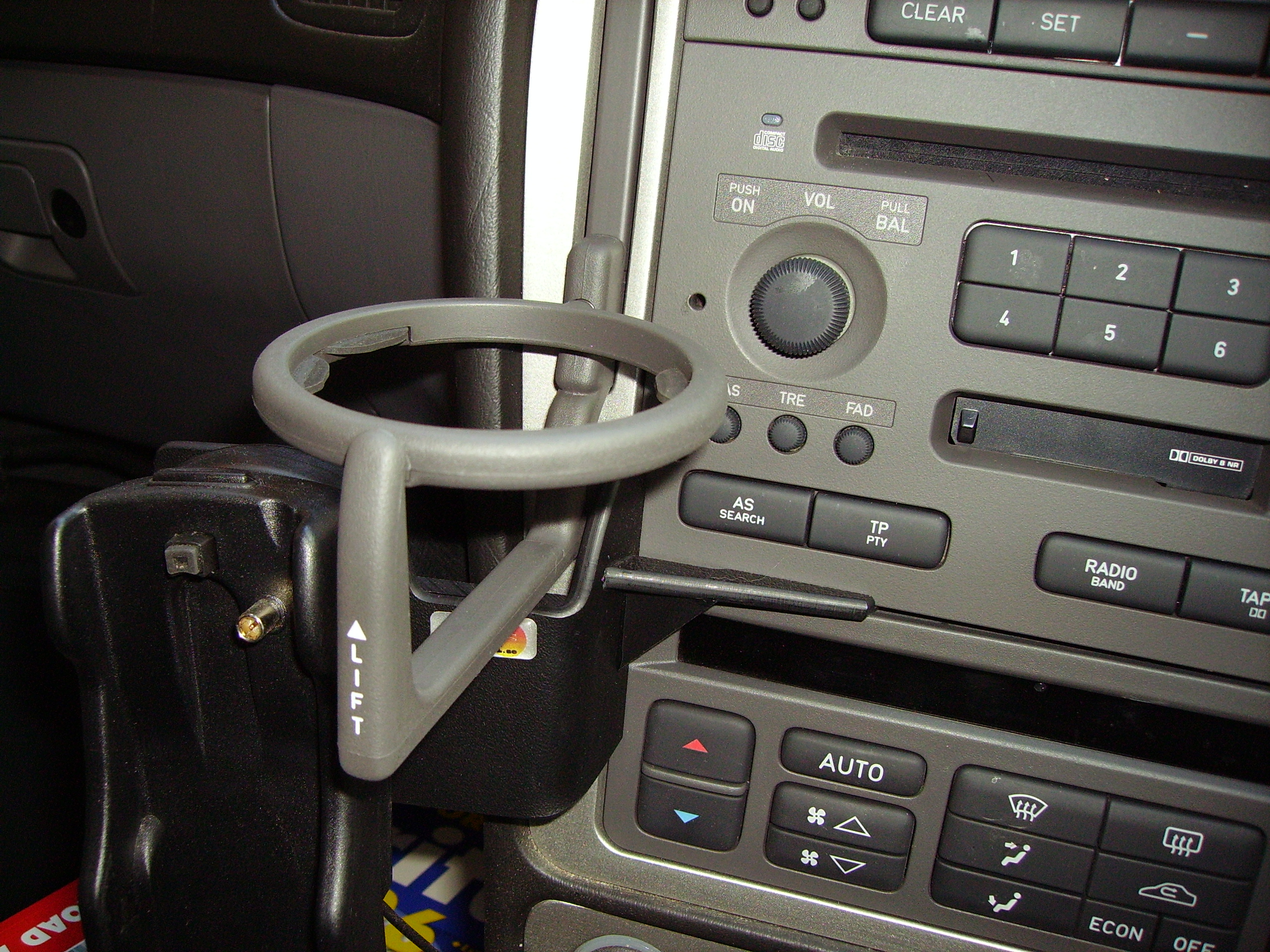
Retractable cup holder in a Saab 9-5.

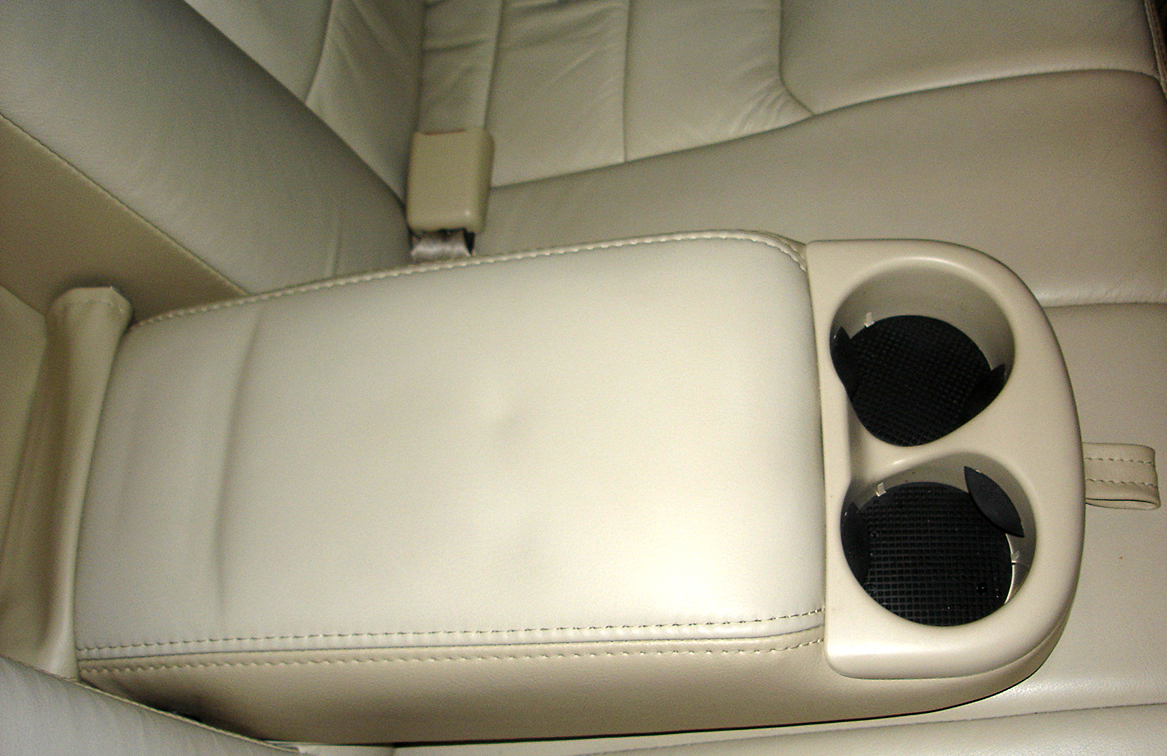
The armrest in the back seat of a Lincoln Town Car, featuring two cup holders.

The development of the drive-in restaurant was a step in the cup holder's development. Servers would attach a tray that hooked over the car's side window, which needed to be left up a little for it to attach to. This gave a temporary table to hold drinks and food while eating in the car. The drive-in restaurant and cinema encouraged the development of built-in tray tables; often, the inside of the glove compartment lid, when folded down, had indentations to hold cups, cans as well as pistachio shells and were found in cars as early as the 1957 Chevrolet Bel Air. These were sufficient to hold beverages when the car was stopped, but not while in motion.

The later development of the drive-through restaurant encouraged the development of better holders for drinks, and a more fast-paced life and longer commute times made many drivers desire to drink their morning coffee in the car on the way to work. The 1960s saw coffee cups with wide, flat, rubberised bases being sold, which would keep them steady on the dash or console. A little later, aftermarket cup holders began to be sold. These often clipped onto the door windows, although other designs wedge in between the front seats and the center console.

Built-in cup holders began to be available in the 1920s. Factory installed cupholders in cars date back to at least the 1930s or 1940s, with many cars featuring shallow indents for cups on the inside of the glovebox lid. One of the first applications of cup holders outside of the glovebox in a mass produced car was in 1977, when the Chevrolet Blazer and Pickup began offering an optional plastic center console with molded cup holders, replacing the square holes that were there before. Later, in 1984, the Plymouth Voyager and Chrysler Town & Country became two of the first vehicles to offer cup holders as standard. Over time, automotive cup holders have become larger and more sophisticated, so that they can hold a variety of different cup sizes securely. Many offer spring-loaded holders that clasp the cup securely, no matter how large or small. The development of ever-larger cups by fast-food chains and convenience stores in the US and Canada has proven a challenge to automotive designers; many fast-food chains now offer 44 fl.oz. (1.3 L) drinks. The automobile cup-holder has also driven the development of "car cups" designed to fit within most cars' cup holders; these have a narrower base but flare outward after a short cylindrical distance. The installation of cup holders in automobiles increased significantly after Stella Liebeck v. McDonald's Corporation, in which a 79-year-old woman in Albuquerque, New Mexico ordered hot coffee from a McDonald's restaurant and, when it spilled, was scalded so severely she required skin grafts.

== Desktop cup holder ==
Earlier wood versions of cup holders for tops of desks have been around decades such as one featured in a U.S. Airline catalog in the late 1980s. Cup holders for edges of desks and tables really picked up steam in the U.S. around 2006 regarding the GW Bush administration. Specifically, the CDC Department. Cup holders for such a use weren't for sale on the internet in the U.S. during most or all of 2005 and possibly not prior. The 1st appearance 2005 to 2006 was by Antro Technology with a cup holder for the edge of a construction table. The 2nd was a South Korean export with a clip for an indoor table. People sometimes drink beverages at their tables and work desks. It is very easy to knock over a cup or mug full of hot tea or coffee and this can then damage expensive laptops or keyboards. Also the hot liquid may cause injury to people or damage to books or carpets.

On a table or work desk, coffee cups can be knocked over by the person sitting and working at the desk by their arms or hands. This can happen very easily if they are disturbed e.g. by a telephone call or by a sudden impulse move. Coffee cups on desks can also be knocked over by pets such as dogs or cats who may jump up on to the desk. Coffee or tea can also spill out of a cup if the table is knocked by a person walking by.

Several devices were patented to hold coffee cups. The main problem in the endeavor is to provide a mechanism to hold the handle of the cup which usually protrudes a few centimeters from the side of the mug. Another problem facing the inventors is the varying sizes of coffee cups. Some devices which were patented are as follows.

- US patent number 5984136 1999. This cup holder has slots to hold the handle and relies on an extended base to hold the cup upright.
- US patent number 6039206 2000. This cup holder features legs which extend when the cup is placed into the holder.
- US patent number D645,308 2011. This cup holder for a surface solves a lot of previous problems. It was shown shortly before being granted on U.S. television however it has not been sold.

In Japan several patents were applied for, but they were not finalized. They have since been commercialized by other manufacturers. These are:

- Number 2006314739.
- Number 2995040642. This cup holder has slots to accommodate the cups handle and has a suction cup to attach the holder to a smooth flat surface, so that it is held securely.

New Zealand patent number 565067. This is a completely free-standing desktop coffee cup holder that can sit on any flat surface this was invented by Digby Green, George Green and Aly Matthews. It can be manufactured in several materials, e.g. wood, metal or plastic. It has been manufactured in plastic by Adovationz Ltd in New Zealand under the brand name of Adkaf.

Dorian Gibbs of Los Angeles, California had the earliest workable cup holder that attaches to a flat edge in the U.S. with US 5,842,671 granted Dec. 1, 1998. US 6,929,229 was granted on Aug. 16, 2005 to Chris D. Palmby of Bellingham, Washington. Perry Segretto of Elmhurst, Illinois had a similar cup holder pending like Palmby's in the U.S. around the same time. Segretto and Michael Koczor sold a cup holder called Drink Hold'em featured on HGTV's "I want that." Antro Technology sold one similar briefly. A South Korean company exported a clip type cup holder to the U.S. No lawsuits were involved to slow the product though mail was received. An agenda regarding jobs with a patent trolls interest occurred during the time of the Obama administration.

A wide variety of cup holders that attach to cylinders were produced in the late 2000s and early 2010s.

== The bus/train/boat cup holder ==
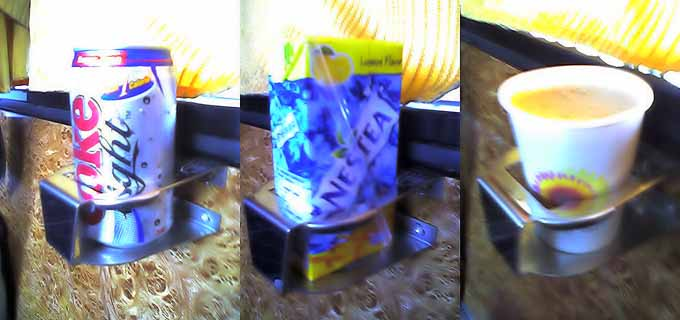
Cup holder installed on a bus.

Before the automobile cup holders, many buses and trains were built with wall-mounted cup holders. These cup holders are usually constructed from thin stainless steel plates. Some of them are covered by rubber. There are now many cup holders available which can be screwed to the walls of boats and buses and recreational vehicles.

Another popular cup holder for boats is the "drop in" cup holder. This is a round plastic item, that has a lip at the top. It requires that a hole is drilled into the boat's table or console and then the unit is inserted and the lip holds it in place. These do not accommodate cups with handles.

== Cinema cup holder ==
AMC Theatres patented cup holder armrests in 1981.

== The cup holder tree ==
These are devices which hold several mugs usually in a kitchen or dining room. People often buy sets of mugs for use in a family or guest situation and they need a place to store them ready for use. These cup holder trees are available in two types. The first type has a base with a vertical mast from which there are hooks to hold each cup or of an "accordion" arm where pegs are placed at each junction of a pivot point. The second type is screwed or mounted underneath shelves or in kitchen cupboards etc..

== See also ==
- Bottle cage
- Podstakannik, a hand-held tea glass holder
