= Turkish coffee =

Coffee brewing method without filters

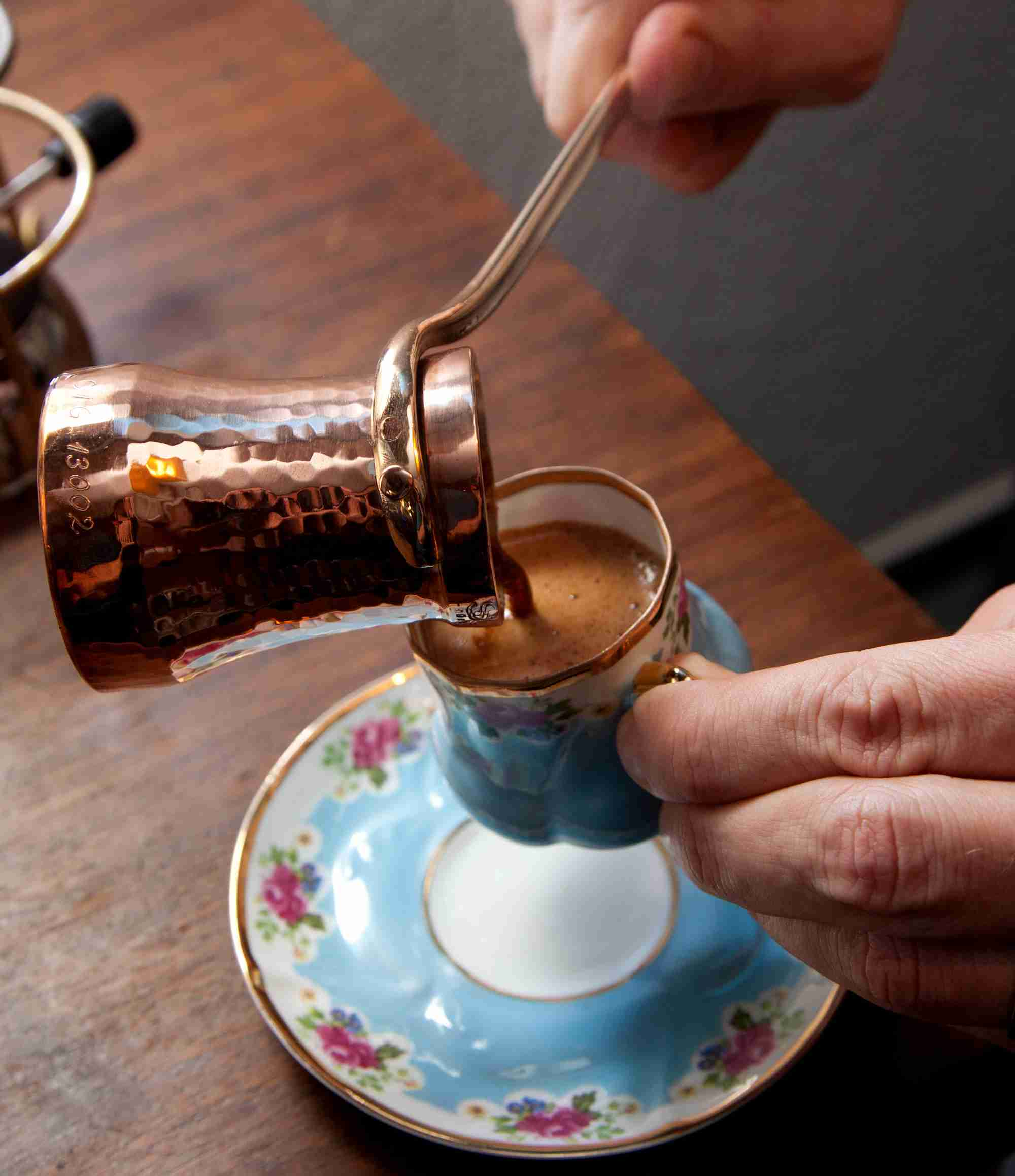
- A cup of Turkish coffee, served from a copper cezve
- Type: Coffee
- Origin: Ottoman Empire
- Color: Dark brown

Turkish coffee (Turkish: Türk kahvesi) is a style of coffee prepared in a pot called a cezve using very finely ground coffee beans without filtering. The drink appears under different names across the Middle East, the Balkans, and the Caucasus.

== Preparation ==
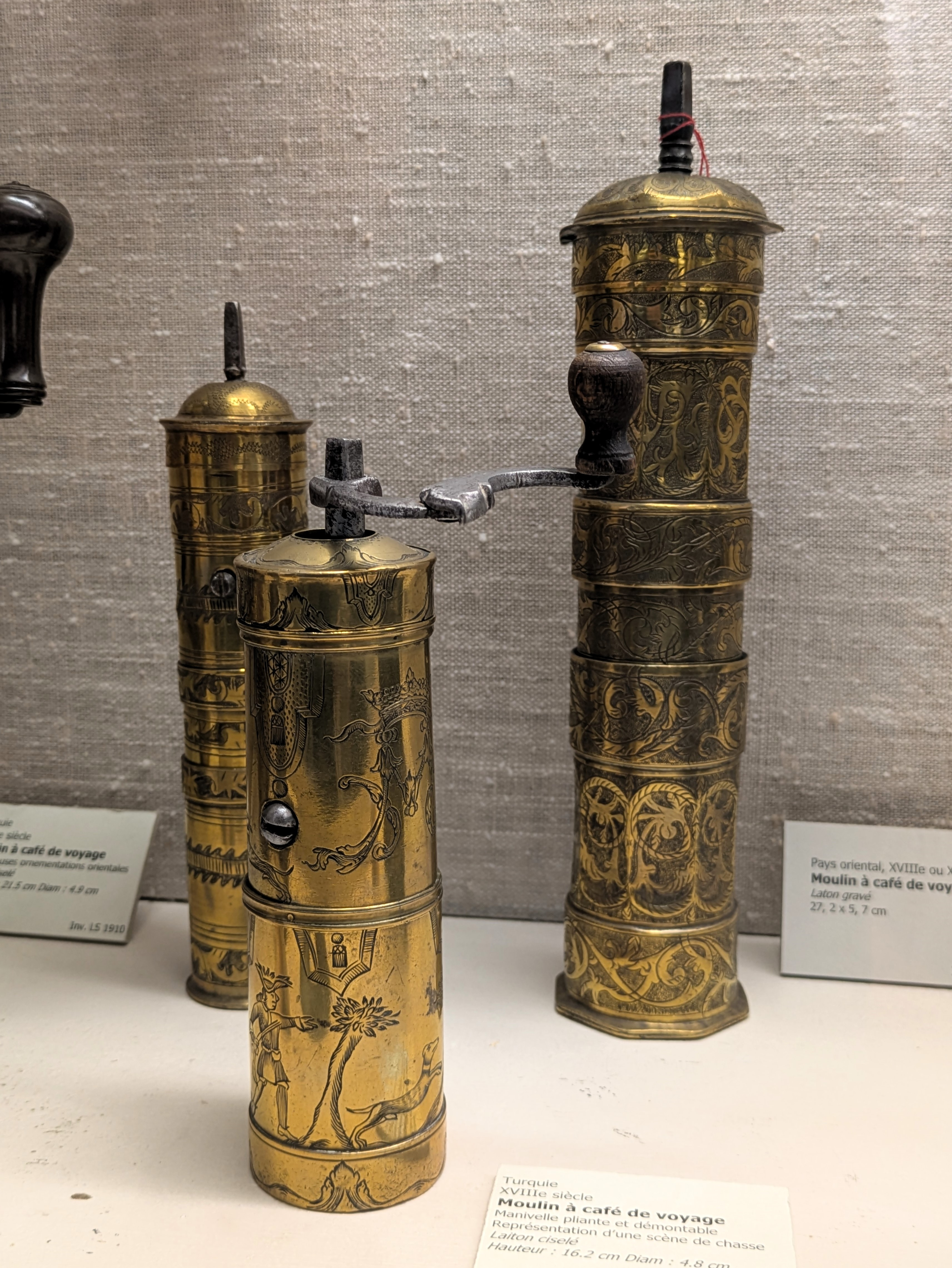
Turkish coffee grinders, to grind coffee to fine powder

Turkish coffee as a beverage is very finely ground coffee brewed in water by bringing just to the boil. Any coffee beans may be used—there are no preferred "Turkish coffee beans". Arabica varieties are considered best, but robusta or a blend is also used. The very fine grind extracts intensely, so that the degree of roast has a big impact; beans are best roasted medium or medium-dark; light and dark roasts do not give best results. The fine grind also means that the coffee grounds will go stale soon after grinding. The coffee grounds remain in the coffee when served. The coffee may be ground at home in a manual grinder made for the very fine grind (electric home grinders are not suitable), ground to order by coffee merchants in most parts of the world, or bought ready-ground—but less fresh—from many shops.

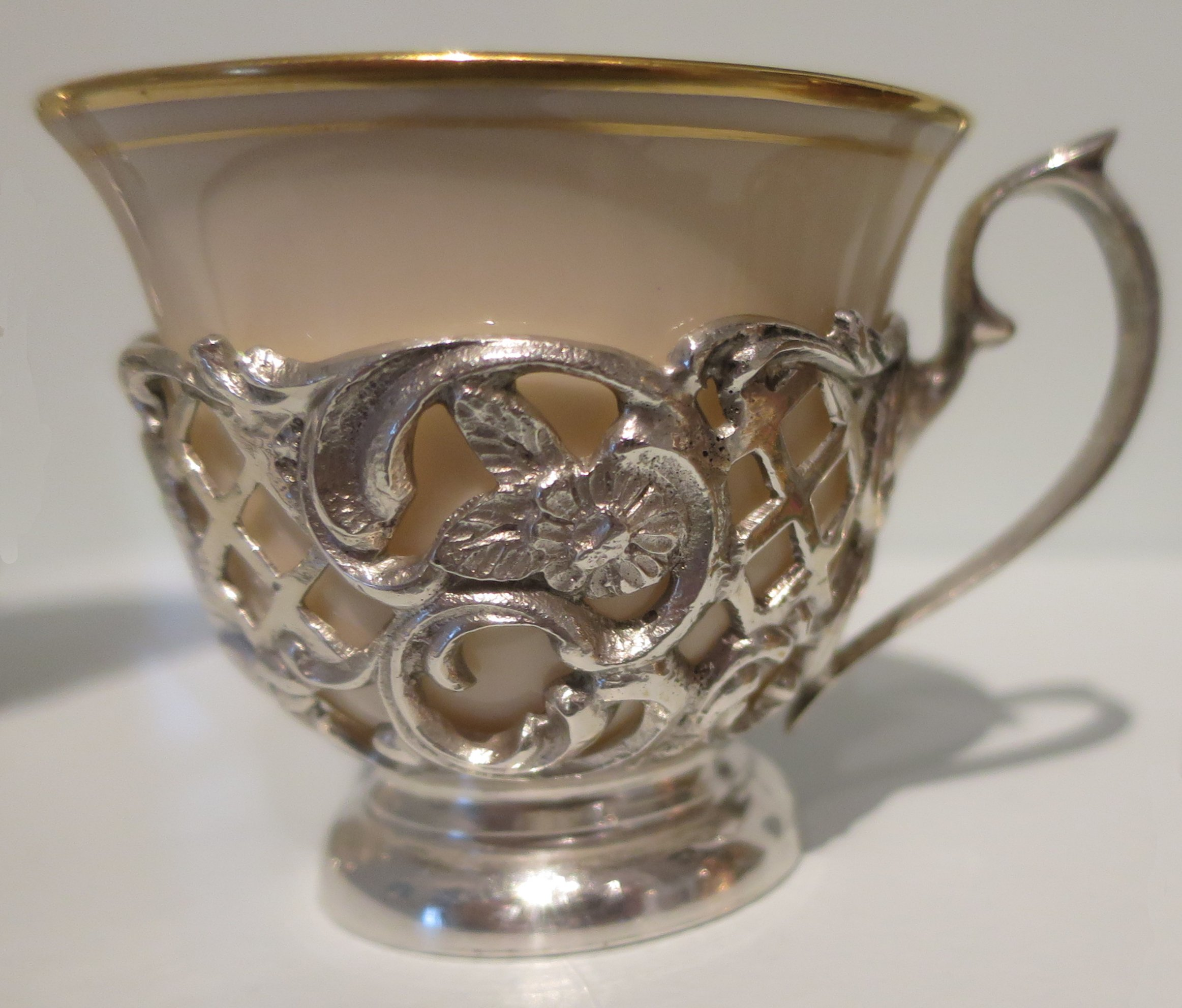
Late Ottoman era Kahve fincanı

Coffee and water, with added sugar if desired, is brought just to the boil in a special pot called cezve in Turkey, and often called ibrik elsewhere. As soon as the mixture begins to froth it is taken off the heat; sometimes a little of the coffee, with the desired froth, is then distributed among small cups holding about 90ml (traditionally porcelain cups called kahve fincanı, 'coffee cup'). The coffee is typically briefly brought to the boil twice more to increase the desired froth, and is then served.

The amount of sugar is specified when ordering the coffee. It may be unsweetened (Turkish: sade kahve), with little or moderate sugar (Turkish: az şekerli kahve, orta şekerli kahve or orta kahve), or sweet (Turkish: çok şekerli kahve). Coffee is often served with something small and sweet to eat, such as Turkish delight. It is sometimes flavoured with cardamom, mastic, salep, or ambergris. Much of the finely powdered coffee is in suspension, and goes into the cup when served; some sinks to the bottom and is left, but much remains in suspension and is drunk with the coffee.

=== According to connoisseurs ===
In a paper for the 2013 Oxford Food Symposium, Tan and Bursa identified the features of the art or craft of making and serving Turkish coffee in the traditional way:

- Roasting. Green coffee beans, ideally the best Arabica beans, are medium-roasted in small quantities over steady heat in a shallow, wrought-iron roasting pan. It is crucial to stop at the right moment, then transfer the beans to the next stage:
- Cooling. The beans are allowed to cool and absorb excess oil in a wooden box. The kind of wood is claimed to affect the taste, walnut being the best.
- Pounding or grinding. The beans must be reduced into a very fine powder; the fineness is crucial to the success of Turkish coffee as it affects the foam and mouth feel. According to one source, the particle size should be 75–125 microns. Strict connoisseurs insist that the beans must be hand-pounded in a mortar, although it is difficult to achieve uniform fineness this way. It is more usual to grind them in a traditional brass mill with steel burrs (or a modern hand grinder that can grind fine enough), though it does make for drier particles.
- Brewing. It is essential to use a proper cezve, a pot traditionally made of thick forged copper, wider at the base than at the neck, with a lip to facilitate pouring, made in various sizes for different numbers of cups. Cold water, several teaspoons of ground coffee (at least 7 grams per cup), and sugar if desired are put in the cezve, and it is heated until it just comes to the boil. The tapering shape of the vessel encourages the formation of foam and retains the volatile aromas. "This stage requires close monitoring and delicate timing since a good Turkish coffee has the thickest possible layer of froth at the top". Some consider that the copper of the cezve improves the taste.
- Serving. A little coffee with froth is poured, the cezve is returned briefly to the heat to froth up once or twice more, and the rest of the coffee is served, topped with froth. The cup does not affect the taste of the coffee as such, but connoisseurs say that it makes a difference: the best cups are made of porcelain with a thin rim, which affects mouth-feel. A long cultural tradition emphasises the pleasure of being served coffee in beautiful cups, which are family heirlooms. The coffee is served with a glass of water, which should be sipped first to cleanse the mouth. Other cultural traditions affect the guest's appreciation of the beverage and the conviviality of the occasion, including story-telling, fortune-telling, and so forth.

While some of these stages may be curtailed in modern coffee drinking, for example the coffee might be purchased already roasted and ground, the rituals and paraphernalia (which e.g. create the anticipatory smell of the roasting beans) do act on the imagination and have a psychological effect.

== History ==
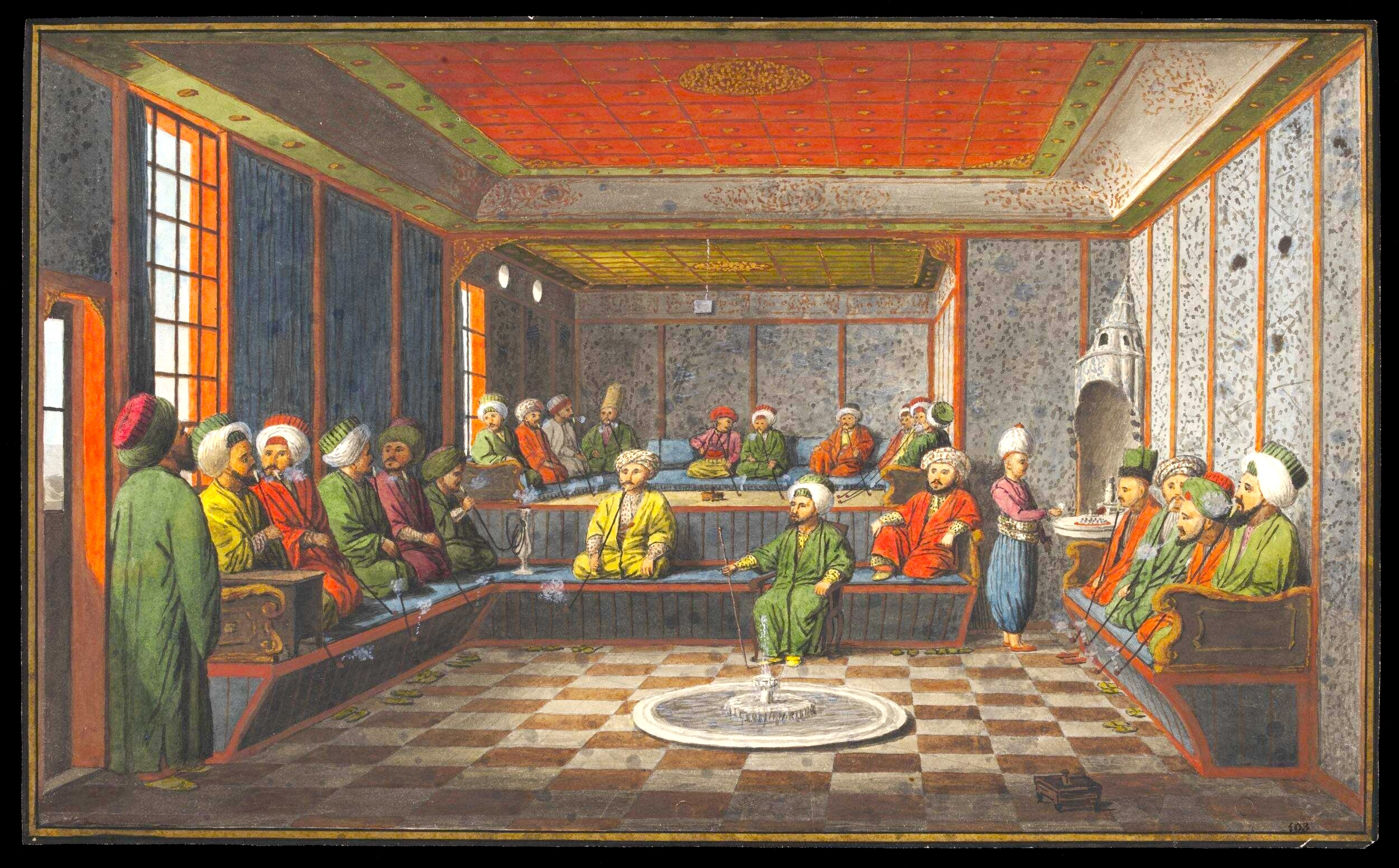
Istanbul coffeehouse, c. 1809 (unknown Greek artist, Victoria and Albert Museum)

Coffee drinking spread in the Islamic world in the 16th century. From the Hijaz it arrived in Cairo; from thence it went to Syria and Istanbul. The coffee tree was first cultivated commercially in the Yemen, having been introduced there from the rainforests of Ethiopia (Note: The robusta species originated further south, in the Congo Basin, but it was not adapted for human consumption until much later.) where it grew wild. For a long time Yemenis had a world monopoly on the export of coffee beans (according to Carl Linnaeus, by deliberately destroying their ability to germinate). From 1538 to 1636 the Ottoman Empire controlled the southern coastal region of what is now Yemen, notably its famous coffee port Mocha. In the 18th century Egypt was the richest province of the Ottoman Empire, and the chief commodity it traded was Yemeni coffee. Cairo merchants were responsible for moving it from the Yemen to markets in the Islamic world.

Coffee was in use in Istanbul by 1539; a legal document mentions that Ottoman admiral Barbaros Hayreddin Pasha's house had a coffee chamber. It appears that the first coffeehouse in Istanbul was opened in 1554 (some say 1551) by two Arab merchants, Hakem of Aleppo and Shems of Damascus (they may have been separate establishments at first). Soon, coffeehouses spread all over Istanbul and even to small towns in Anatolia.

Ignatius d'Ohsson described for French readers the Turkish method of brewing coffee (Tableau Général de l'Empire Othoman, 1789). His description, translated in this note, closely resembles the present day version, including the production of foam. From the traveller Jean de Thévenot it appears Turks were preparing it at least a century before that. He mentions that they drank it black; some added cloves, cardamom or sugar, but it was thought to be less healthy, and until recently an older generation of connoisseurs disdained the habit of sugaring Turkish coffee.

=== Origin of the Turkish method ===
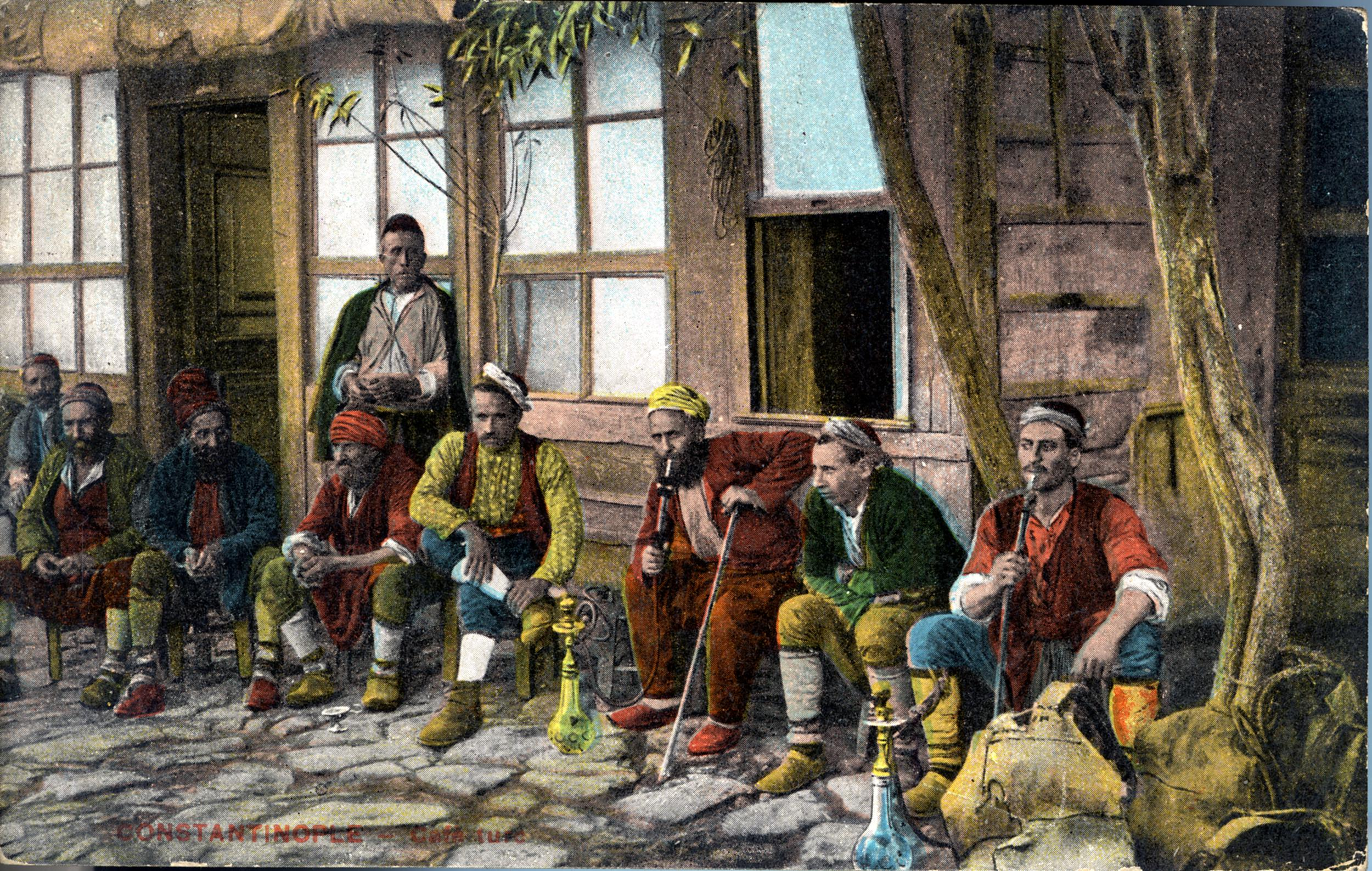
Outside an Istanbul coffeehouse (1910 postcard, British Museum)

There are inconsistent claims about the origin of Turkish coffee. Without citing historical sources, some authors have asserted the method originated in the Yemen; or in Damascus (a plausible, if unsubstantiated claim, since the Middle Eastern coffeehouse did probably originate in Damascus and was brought to Istanbul by Syrians, see above). A 1762 Danish expedition recorded that "northern and eastern Arabs" prepared bean coffee "in the same way as with the Turks".

Yemenis may have been the first to drink coffee as a hot beverage instead of chewing the bean, or adding it to solid food, and the earliest social users were probably Sufi mystics in that region who needed to stay awake for their nocturnal vigils.

Observations recorded by Carsten Niebuhr during the Danish expedition to Arabia noted that the bean coffee described as commonly consumed by "northern and eastern Arabs," and prepared "in the same way as with the Turks," was reported to be seldom drunk in Yemen, where it was regarded as excessively stimulating; they much preferred kisher, a beverage made of the coffee shells which more closely resembled a tea; it has been said that Yemenis do not drink much coffee to this day.

If Turkish coffee is defined as "a very strong black coffee served with the fine grounds in it", then the method is generic in Middle Eastern cities (in rural areas a different method is used and is called Arabic coffee). The drink goes by various other names too, such as Egyptian, Syrian, or Greek coffee, with local variations.

=== Illegality and acceptance ===
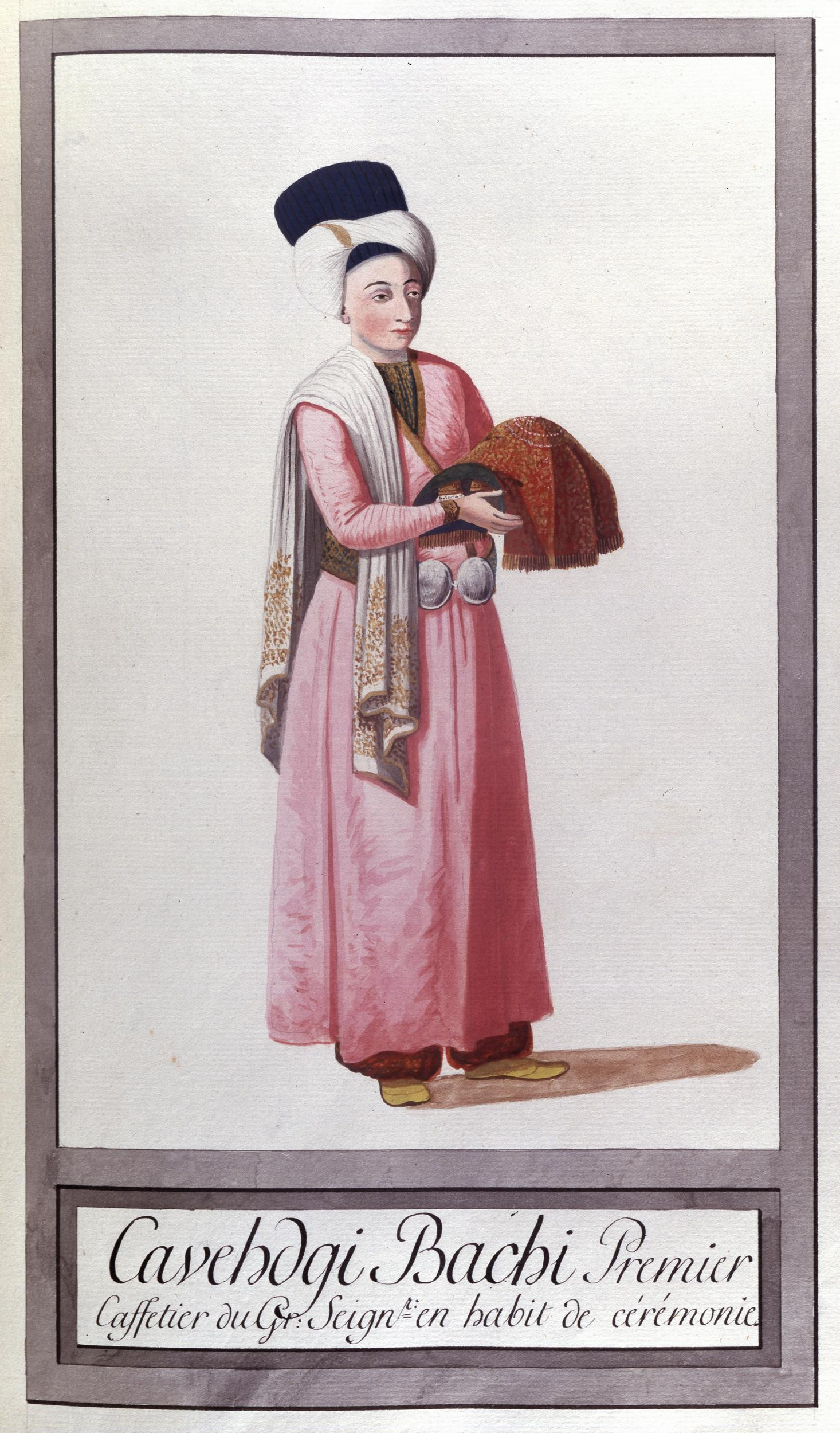
Sultan's chief coffee-cook in his ceremonial robes c. 1790 (British Museum)

The English word coffee derives from Turkish kahve, which came from Arabic qahwah, which could mean 'wine'. It is sometimes stated that coffee was forbidden in Islam, albeit the ban was not very effective. However, it seems that most Muslim religious scholars were not averse to coffee, or actively supported it; but governments wanted to suppress coffee gatherings, fearing they were foci of political dissent. "What was condemned was not caffeine's physiological effects but rather the freedom of coffeehouse talk which rulers considered subversive".

Already in 1543 several ships were ordered to be sunk in Istanbul harbour for importing coffee. Under Sultan Murad IV those found keeping a coffeehouse were cudgelled for a first offence, and sewn in a bag and thrown into the Bosphorus for a second. These bans were sporadic and often ignored. (Similarly, the government of Charles II of England tried to suppress coffee houses as seditious gatherings—the ban lasted a few days—and, much later, the republican government of Mustafa Kemal Atatürk tried to prohibit or discourage coffeehouses in Turkish villages, saying they were places where men gathered to waste their time). Eventually the authorities found it to their advantage to tax rather than suppress the trade. Fifteen years after coffee arrived in Istanbul there were over 600 coffeehouses according to an Armenian historian.

It was not easy to prepare Turkish coffee very well at the time, and prominent Ottoman Turks kept specialist coffee cooks for the purpose. Suleiman the Magnificent had a kahvecibasi or chief coffee-cook, and it became a traditional practice for sultans. To demonstrate the civility of their rule, they built magnificent coffeehouses in newly conquered parts of the Ottoman Empire.

=== International diffusion ===
==== Western Europe ====
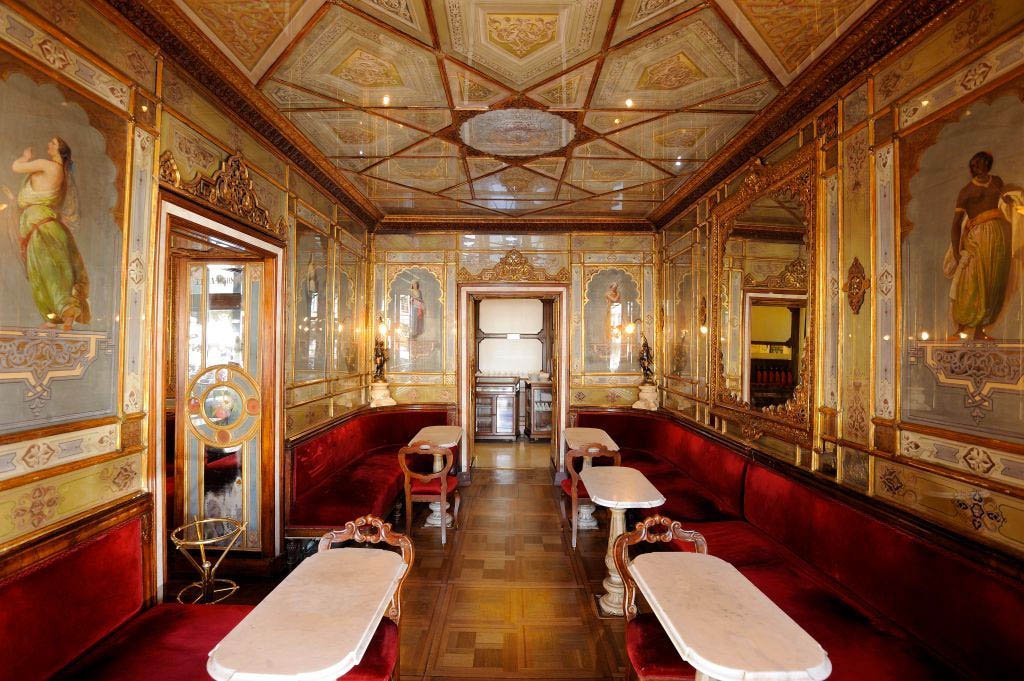
Oriental room, Caffè Florian, Venice, in business since 1720

From the Ottoman Empire, coffee-drinking spread to western Europe, probably being first introduced into Venice, where it was consumed as a medicine. Early consumers were travellers who imported it for their own use. Other early users were virtuosi, gentleman-scholars curious about the outside world and willing to try exotic products. Since these early adopters were trying to recreate the genuine article, probably they were making proper Turkish coffee, or at least something like it. For example, Jean de Thévenot imported authentic ibriks from the Ottoman Empire.

However, most early modern Europeans did not like coffee, which is an acquired taste, and especially they did not like the black, bitter Turkish version. In any case it was too expensive: in France, coffee beans sold for the equivalent of US$8,000 a kilo. Coffee did not become a popular beverage until it was altered to appeal to European palates and its price drastically lowered.

The Yemeni coffee monopoly was broken by the Dutch, who managed to obtain viable coffee plants from Mocha and propagated them to their empire in Java. They were followed by the French, who planted a tree at the Jardin des Plantes de Paris; it has been claimed that "This tree was destined to be the progenitor of most of the coffee of the French colonies, as well as those of South America, Central America, and Mexico", i.e. most of the coffee in the world, though it has been called "a neat story". By the time of the French Revolution, 80% of the world's coffee was grown in the Americas, and French coffee was ousting Yemeni coffee in Cairo, even being exported back to Mocha itself. The price of coffee fell so much that by the mid-18th century it was accessible to French townspeople of all classes.

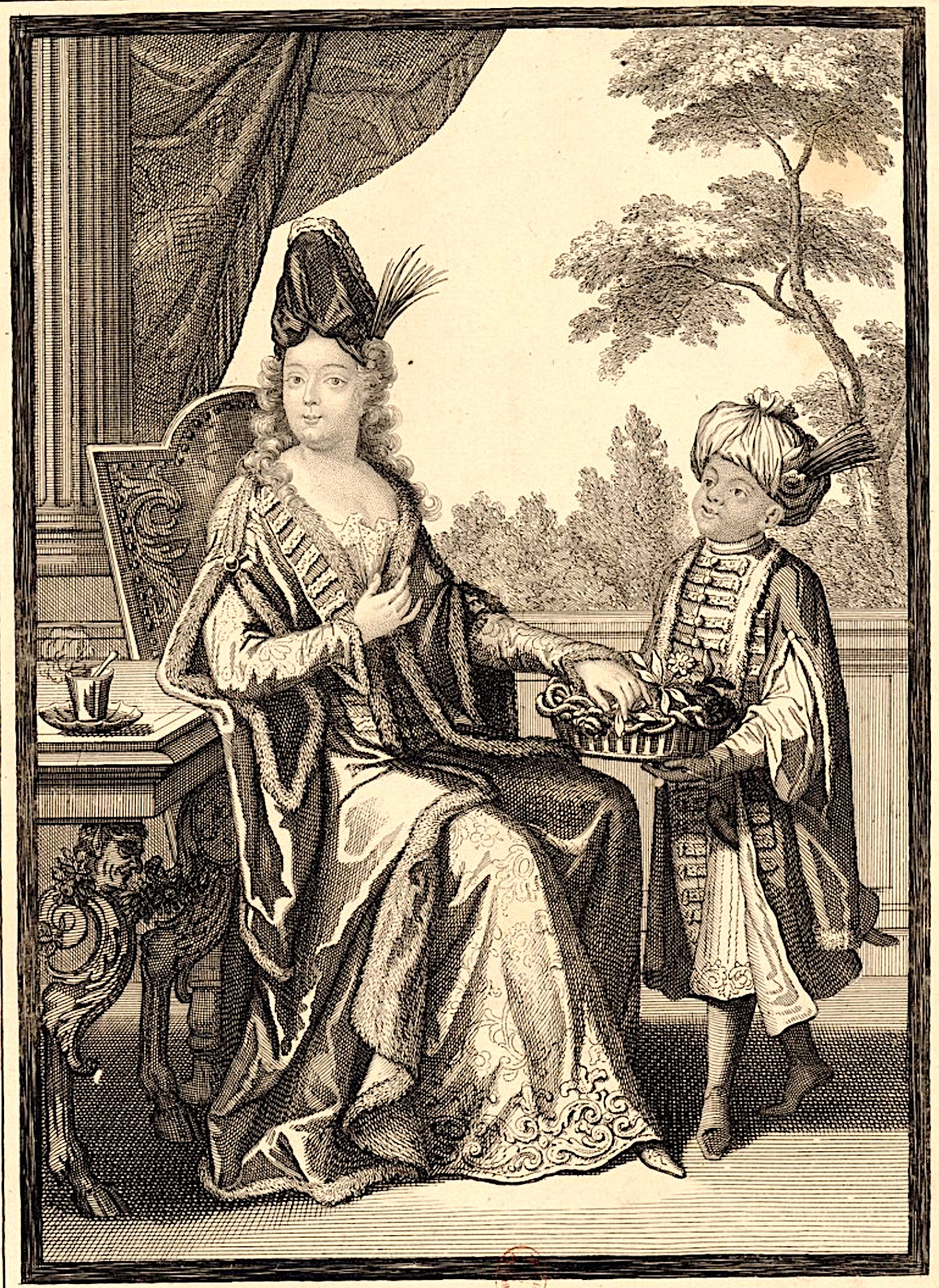
Fashion plate, Paris, 1694: the Princesse de Bournonville takes coffee in 'Turkish' attire (Nicolas Bonnart: Biblothèque Nationale de France)

When coffee was eventually popularised, what was served was not made the Turkish way, but a product heavily diluted with water (much weaker than modern espresso) or milk, and sweetened with sugar. "Combining coffee with fresh milk turned a Turkish drink into a French one". Already in 1689, in a paper for fellow scientists at the Royal Society, London, John Houghton, though stressing coffee's Ottoman origins, said very good coffee was made by boiling the grounds in plenty of water and letting them settle, leaving a clear, reddish liquor, which is not Turkish coffee.

Despite this, the "Turkish" connection was strongly promoted, since its exotic connotations helped the new drink to sell. Coffeehouse-keepers wore turbans, or called their shops "Turk's Head" and suchlike. Especially in France there was a craze for things Turkish: fashion plates depicted aristocratic ladies taking coffee while dressed as sultanas, attended by servants in Moorish costume. Its medical value was stressed: it became popular in France when doctors advised café au lait was good for health. In England, the earliest advertisement (1652) for a coffee house — owned by Pasqua Rosée, an Armenian from Ragusa (modern Dubrovnik) — claimed that Turkish people "are not troubled with the Stone, Gout, Dropsie, or Scurvey" and "their skins are exceedingly cleer and white". Despite this, Rosée's product was weak enough to be drunk a half pint (485 ml) at a time on an empty stomach, not an attribute of real Turkish coffee. If there were 'Turkish' coffeehouses in Oxford or Paris, the cited historical sources do not show they were serving coffee made in the Turkish manner.

The real Ottoman influence was on European coffee house culture. "The coffeehouse and café, far from being English and French creations, were at heart an import from Mecca, Cairo, and Constantinople", a topic outside the scope of this article.

==== America ====
The first person who brought coffee to America may have been Captain John Smith and, since he had been in Turkish service (he had been enslaved and given to a pasha's mistress), conceivably he prepared it in the Turkish manner. Already by 1683 William Penn was complaining about the price of coffee in Pennsylvania.

=== Decline ===
In the 20th century, especially in wartime and the 1950s, shortages in Turkey meant that coffee was scarcely available for years at a time, or was adulterated with chickpeas and other substances. Habits changed; the old coffee culture declined; the epicurean coffee aficionado was less to be seen. Although still important in Turkish tradition, today Turks drink more tea than coffee. A survey of Turkish regions found that in some areas "coffee" was made without using coffee beans at all. By 2018 there were said to be over 400 Starbucks coffeehouses in Istanbul alone, and younger Turks were embracing third-wave coffee. The most popular brand in Turkey is Nescafé instant coffee. However, UNESCO has inscribed Turkish coffee culture and tradition on the Representative List of the Intangible Cultural Heritage of Humanity, and "there still exist serious aficionados who would never trade the taste of Turkish coffee with anything else".

== Culture ==
=== Fortune-telling ===
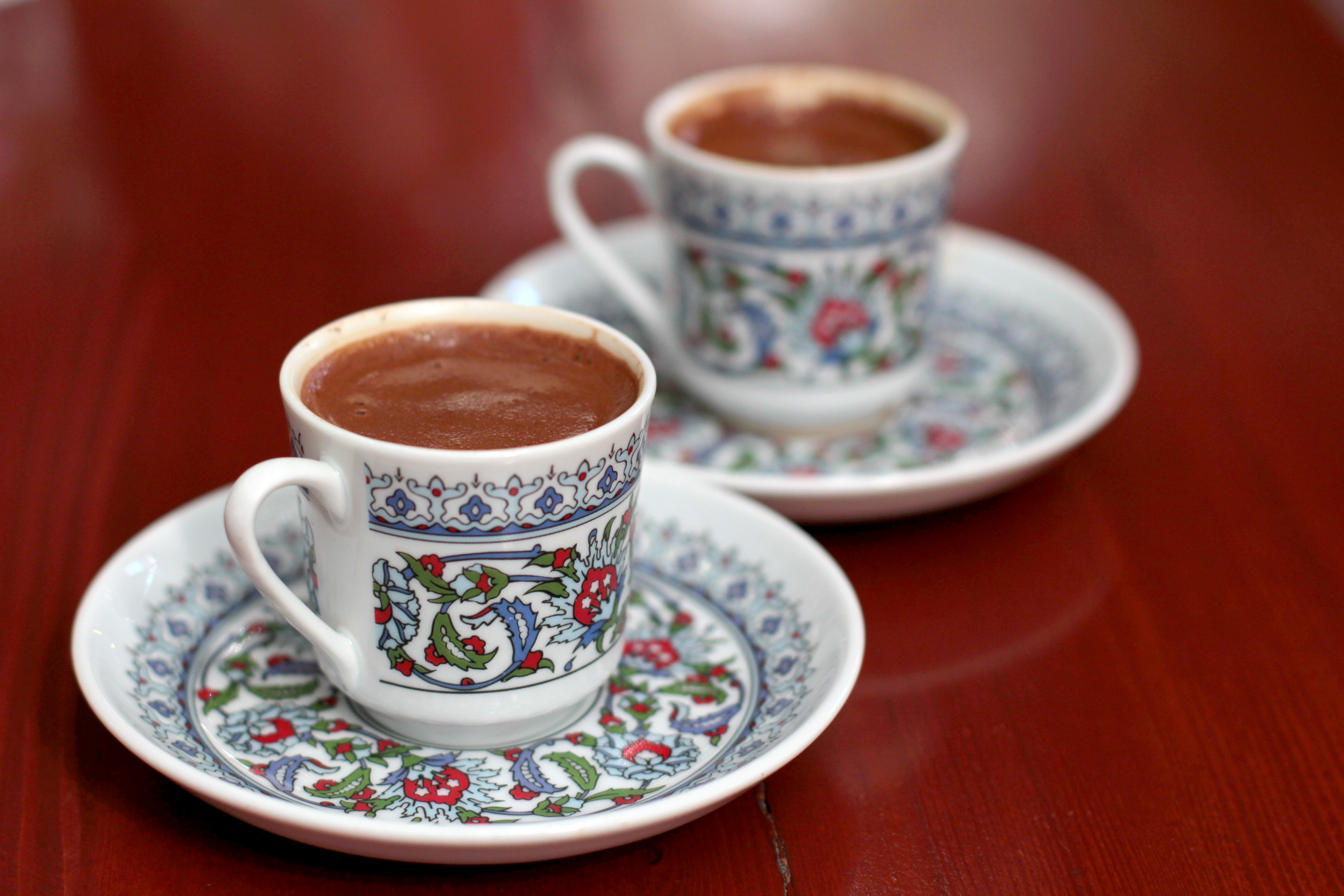
Turkish coffee

The grounds left after drinking Turkish coffee are sometimes used to tell fortunes, a practice known as tasseography. The cup is turned over into the saucer to cool, and the patterns of the coffee grounds are interpreted.

=== Turkish weddings ===
As well as being an everyday beverage, Turkish coffee is also a part of the traditional Turkish wedding custom. As a prologue to marriage, the bridegroom's parents (in the lack of his father, his mother and an elderly member of his family) must visit the young girl's family to ask the hand of the bride-to-be and the blessings of her parents upon the upcoming marriage. During this meeting, the bride-to-be must prepare and serve Turkish coffee to the guests. For the groom's coffee, the bride-to-be sometimes uses salt instead of sugar to gauge his character. If the bridegroom drinks his coffee without any sign of displeasure, the bride-to-be assumes that the groom is good-tempered and patient. As the groom already comes as the demanding party to the girl's house, in fact it is the boy who is passing an exam and etiquette requires him to receive with all smiles this particular present from the girl. In some regions, however, "if the coffee is brewed without any froth, it means 'You have no chance!'"

== Names and variants ==
There is controversy about its name e.g. in some ex-Ottoman dependencies, mostly due to nationalistic feelings or political rivalry with Turkey.

=== Within Turkey ===
==== Sand coffee ====
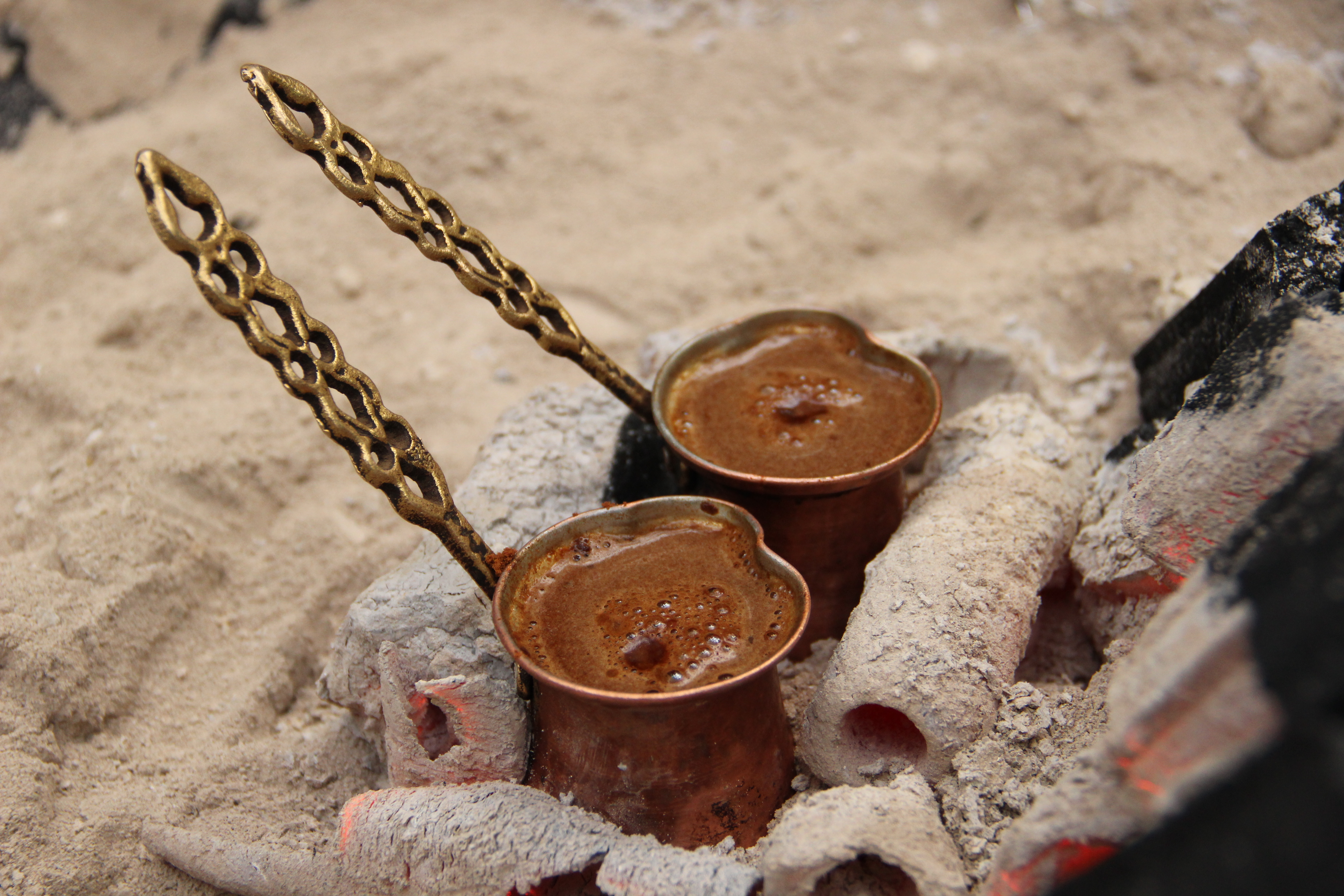
Sand coffee

An ancient traditional method involves placing the cezve filled with coffee in a pan filled with hot sand. The pan is heated over an open flame, thereby letting the sand take total control of the heat. The heat created by the sand lets the coffee foam to the top almost immediately. The heat can also be adjusted by the depth of the cezve in the sand. This process is usually repeated three to four times, and the coffee is then served in small cups.

==== Dibek Coffee ====
Dibek Coffee is a type of Turkish coffee named after the traditional method used to grind the beans. Originally, “dibek” referred to two slightly indented stones used to crush roasted coffee beans by rubbing them together. Over time, the design of the dibek became deeper and more practical.

The roasted beans are crushed in the dibek using a wooden or iron hammer until they reach the desired size. Unlike finely powdered coffee, the coffee ground in a dibek has a coarse texture. This method preserves the aromatic oils in the coffee, enhancing its flavor and helping to maintain its foam during cooking.

Dibek Coffee is recognized as a local specialty in various regions of Turkey. A coffeehouse in Kırklareli that serves dibek coffee has been operating since 1877. It is considered a local product in the Gökçeada district of Çanakkale and Zeytinliköy. Dibek Coffee is highlighted as a gastronomic representative of İzmir and its surrounding areas, including Urla, Seferihisar, Sığacık, Çeşme, Alaçatı, and nearby villages.

==== Cilveli Coffee ====
Cilveli Coffee is made by adding a mixture of double-roasted ground almonds and two spices to foamy Turkish coffee in a cup. A spoon is served alongside the coffee, allowing the guest to first eat the almond mixture on top before drinking the coffee. The combination of the almond mixture and foam creates a unique flavor. Double-roasting the almonds prevents them from sinking to the bottom of the coffee.

Cilveli Coffee is a traditional type of Turkish coffee from Manisa. Historically, it was prepared for princes, and in Manisa, it is also part of marriage rituals. Young women would offer this coffee to show their approval of a suitor and his family during a visit.

=== Armenia ===
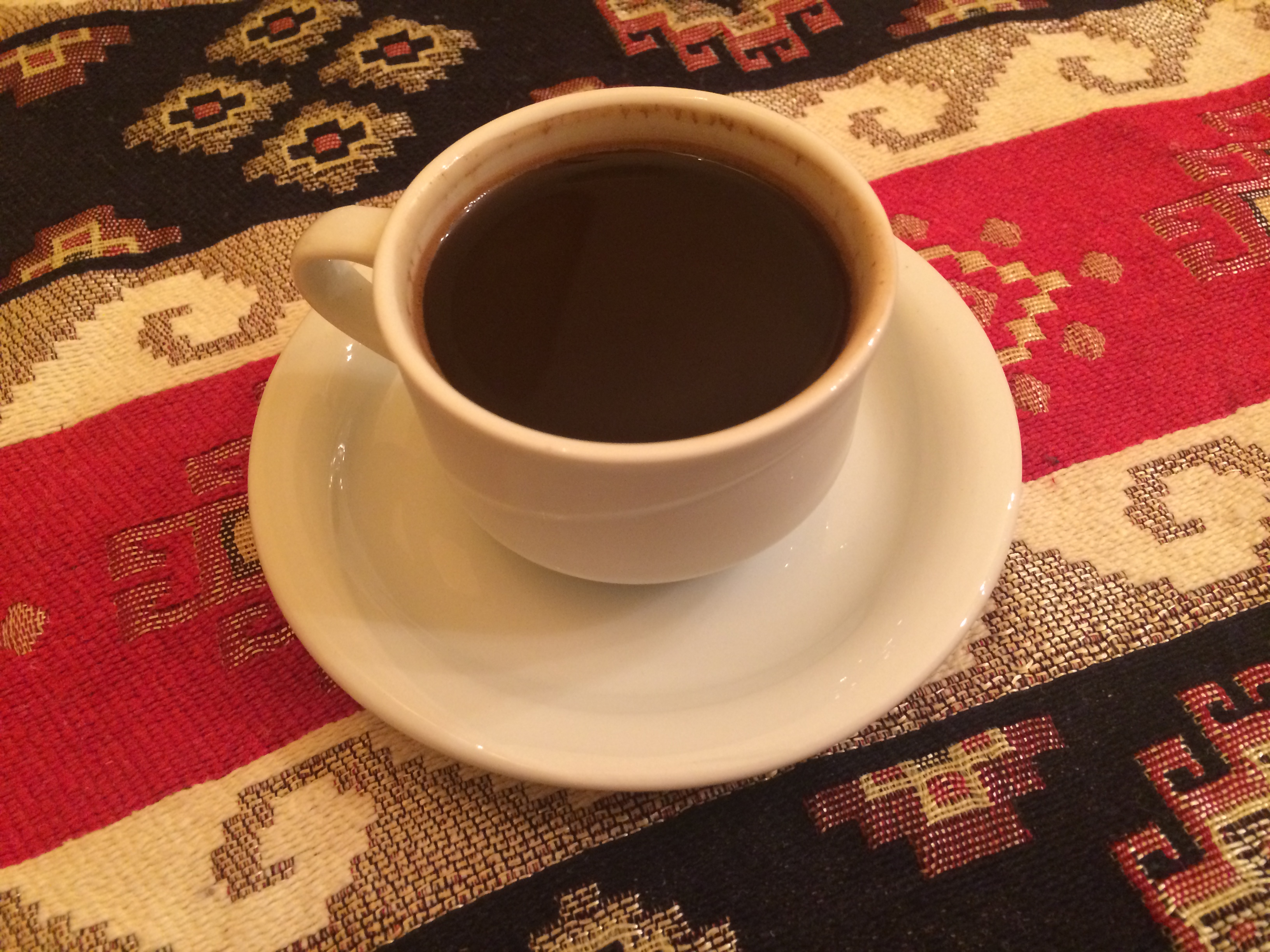
Armenian coffee

This type of strong coffee is a standard of Armenian households. The main difference is that cardamom is used in Armenian coffee. Armenians introduced the coffee to Corfu when they settled the island, where it is known as "eastern coffee" due to its Eastern origin. Corfu, which had never been part of the Ottoman holdings, did not have an established Ottoman coffee culture before it was introduced by the Armenians. According to The Reuben Percy Anecdotes compiled by journalist Thomas Byerley, an Armenian opened a coffee shop in Europe in 1674, at a time when coffee was first becoming fashionable in the West.

The term Turkish coffee is still used in many languages, but in Armenian it is either called հայկական սուրճ, haykakan surč, 'Armenian coffee', or սեւ սուրճ, sev surč, 'black coffee', referring to the traditional preparation done without milk or creamer. If unsweetened it is called 'bitter' (դառը, daruh) in Armenia, but more commonly it is brewed with a little sugar (normal). Armenians will sometimes serve a plate of baklava, gata, or nazook alongside the coffee.

=== Czech Republic, Slovakia, Poland and Lithuania ===
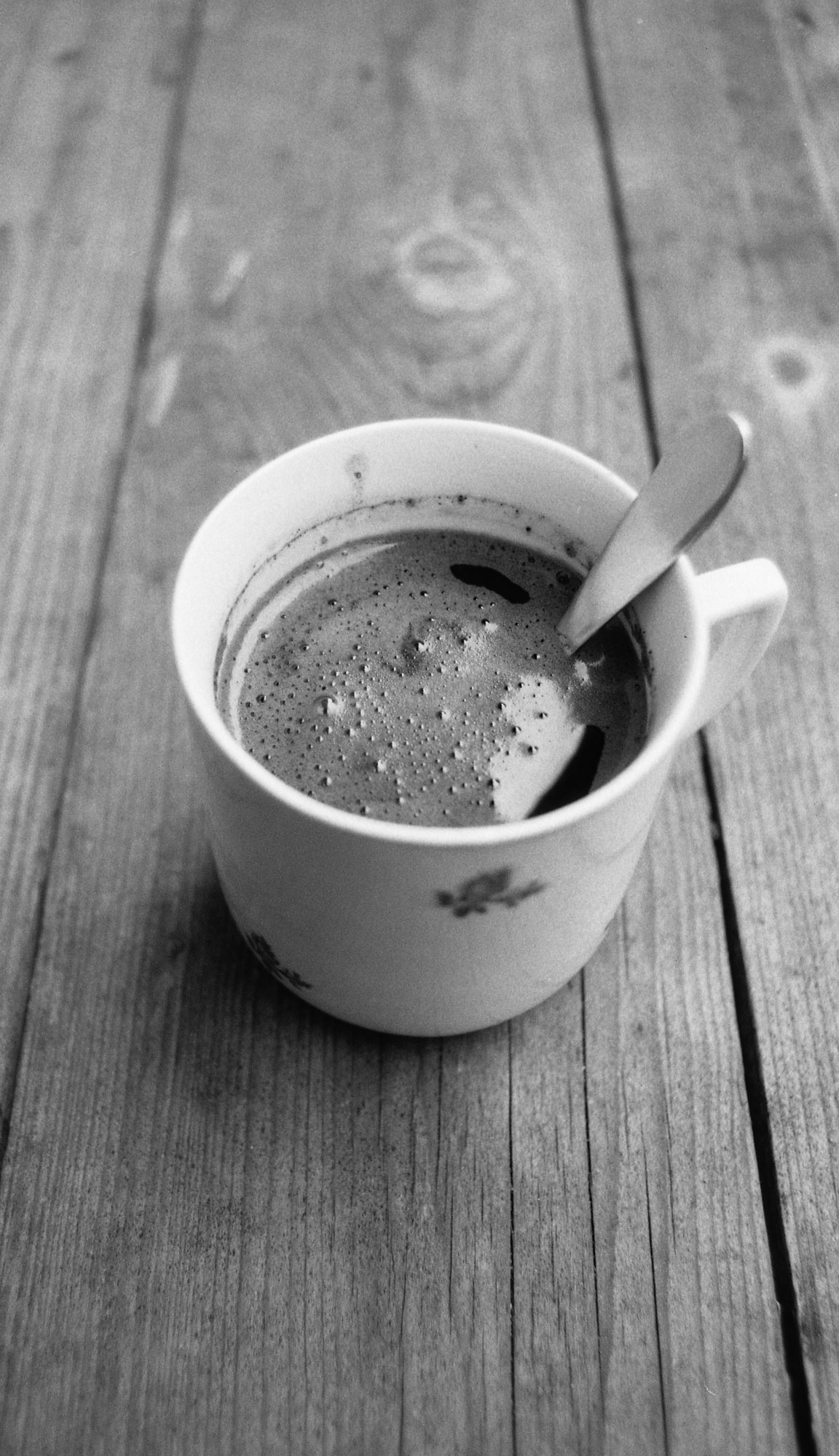
Typical Czech or Slovak Turkish coffee made of ground coffee beans poured with boiling water

A beverage called turecká káva or turek is very popular in the Czech Republic and Slovakia, although other forms of coffee preparation such as espresso have overtaken turek. Turek is usually no longer served in cafés, but it is prepared in pubs and kiosks, and in homes. The Czech and Slovak form of Turkish coffee is a little different from the method in Turkey, the Arab world or Balkan countries, since a cezve is not used; instead the desired amount of ground coffee is put in a cup and boiling or almost boiling water is poured over it. In recent years, Turkish coffee is also made in a cezve (džezva in Czech), but Turkish coffee usually means the method described above. Coffee is prepared in the same way in Poland and Lithuania.

=== Greece ===
In Greece, Turkish coffee was formerly referred to simply as 'Turkish' (τούρκικος). But political tensions with Turkey in the 1950s led to the political euphemism Greek coffee (ελληνικός καφές), which became even more popular after the Turkish invasion of Cyprus in 1974: "[…] Greek–Turkish relations at all levels became strained, 'Turkish coffee' became 'Greek coffee' by substitution of one Greek word for another while leaving the Arabic loan-word, for which there is no Greek equivalent, unchanged." There were even advertising campaigns promoting the name Greek coffee in the 1990s. The name for a coffee pot remains either a briki (μπρίκι) in mainland Greek or a tzisves (τζισβές) in Cypriot Greek.

=== Former Yugoslavia ===
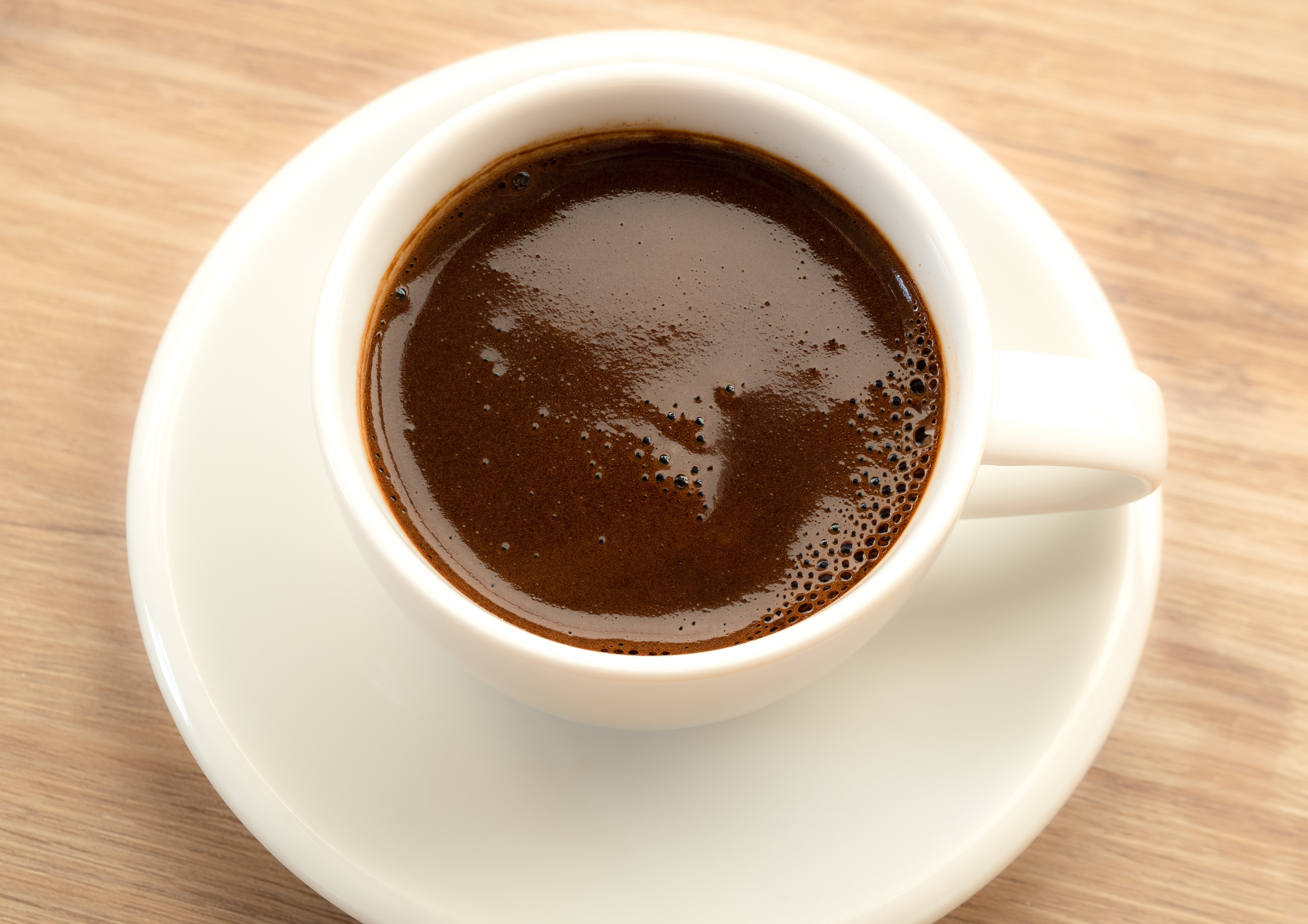
Cup of coffee made in a džezva, from Serbia

In Bosnia and Herzegovina, Turkish coffee is also called Bosnian coffee (Bosnian: bosanska kahva), which is made slightly differently from its Turkish counterpart. A deviation from the Turkish preparation is that when the water boils, a little is set aside. Then the coffee and the water set aside is added to the pot (džezva) and brought back to the boil. Coffee drinking in Bosnia is a traditional daily custom and plays an important role during social gatherings.

In Serbia, Slovenia, North Macedonia, Montenegro, and Croatia it is called 'Turkish coffee' (Note: Serbian: турска кафа, romanized: turska kafa;Slovene: turška kava; Croatian: turska kava), 'domestic coffee' (Note: Serbian: домаћа кафа, romanized: domaća kafa; Slovene: domača kava; Croatian: domaća kava) or simply 'coffee', (Note: Serbian: кафа, romanized: kafa; Slovene: kava; Croatian: kava) and is nearly identical to the Turkish version. In Serbia, Turkish coffee is also called српска кафа (srpska kafa, 'Serbian coffee').

== See also ==
- List of coffee beverages
- Kurdish coffee
