= Ibrik =

Turkish pitcher or coffee pot

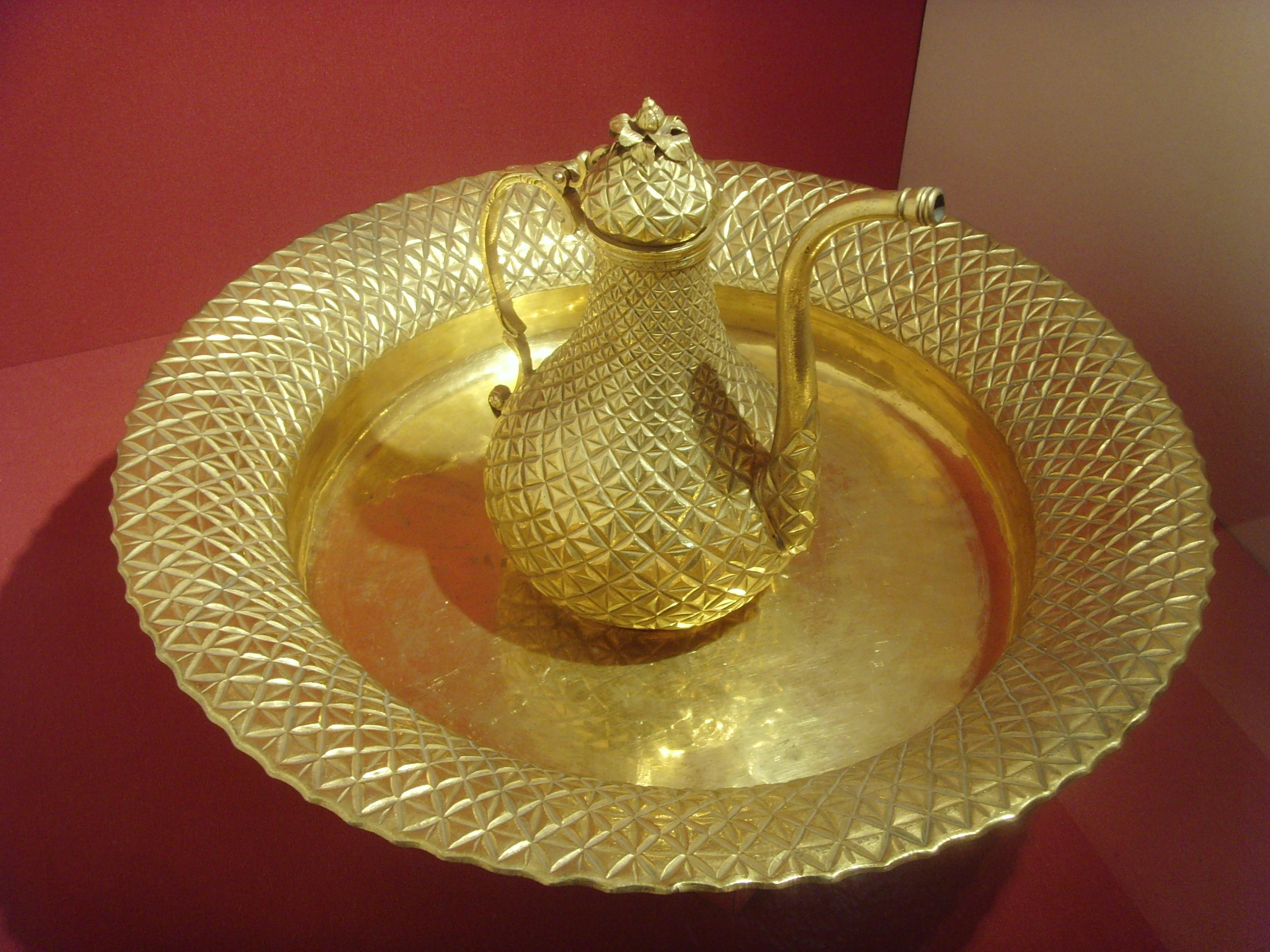

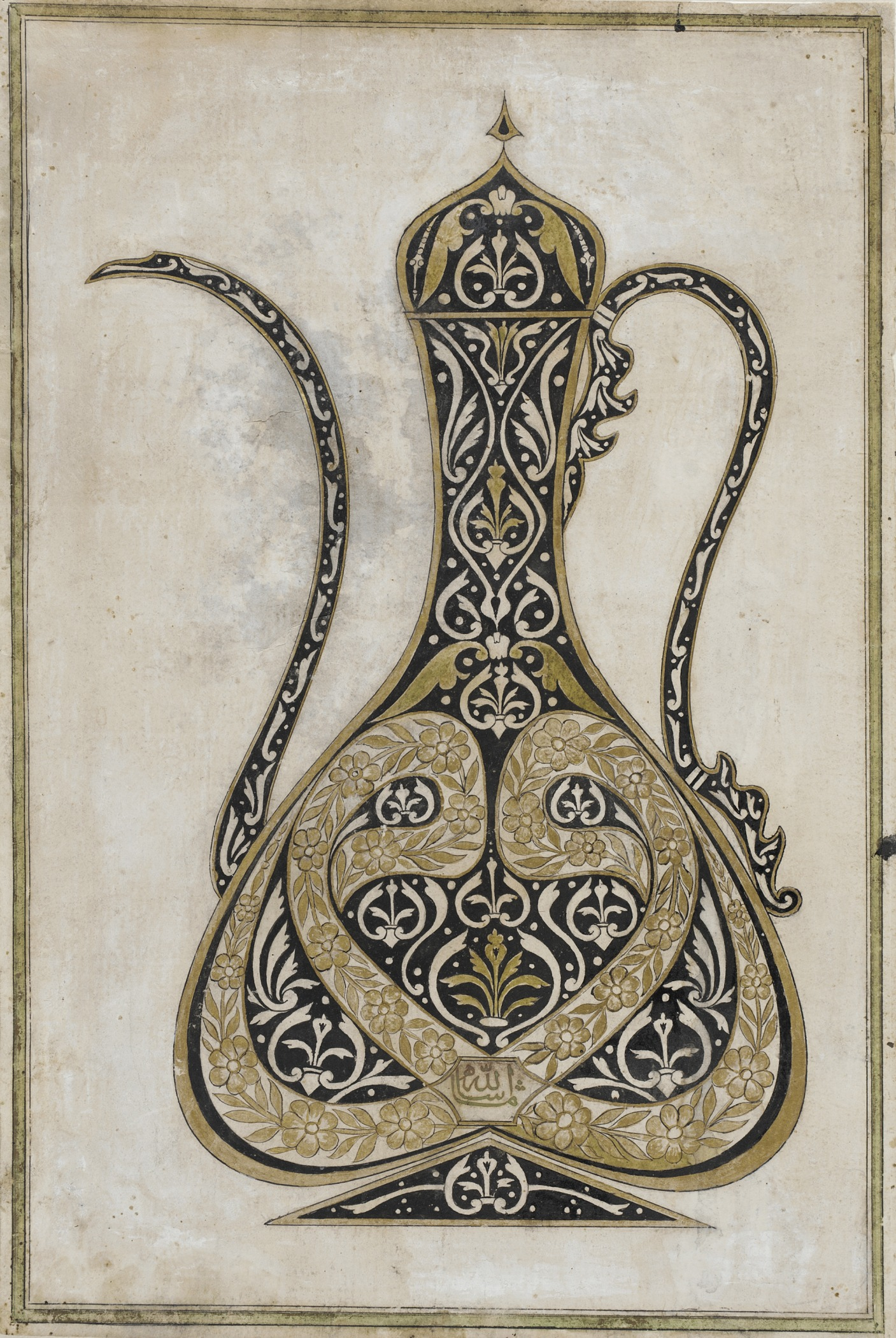

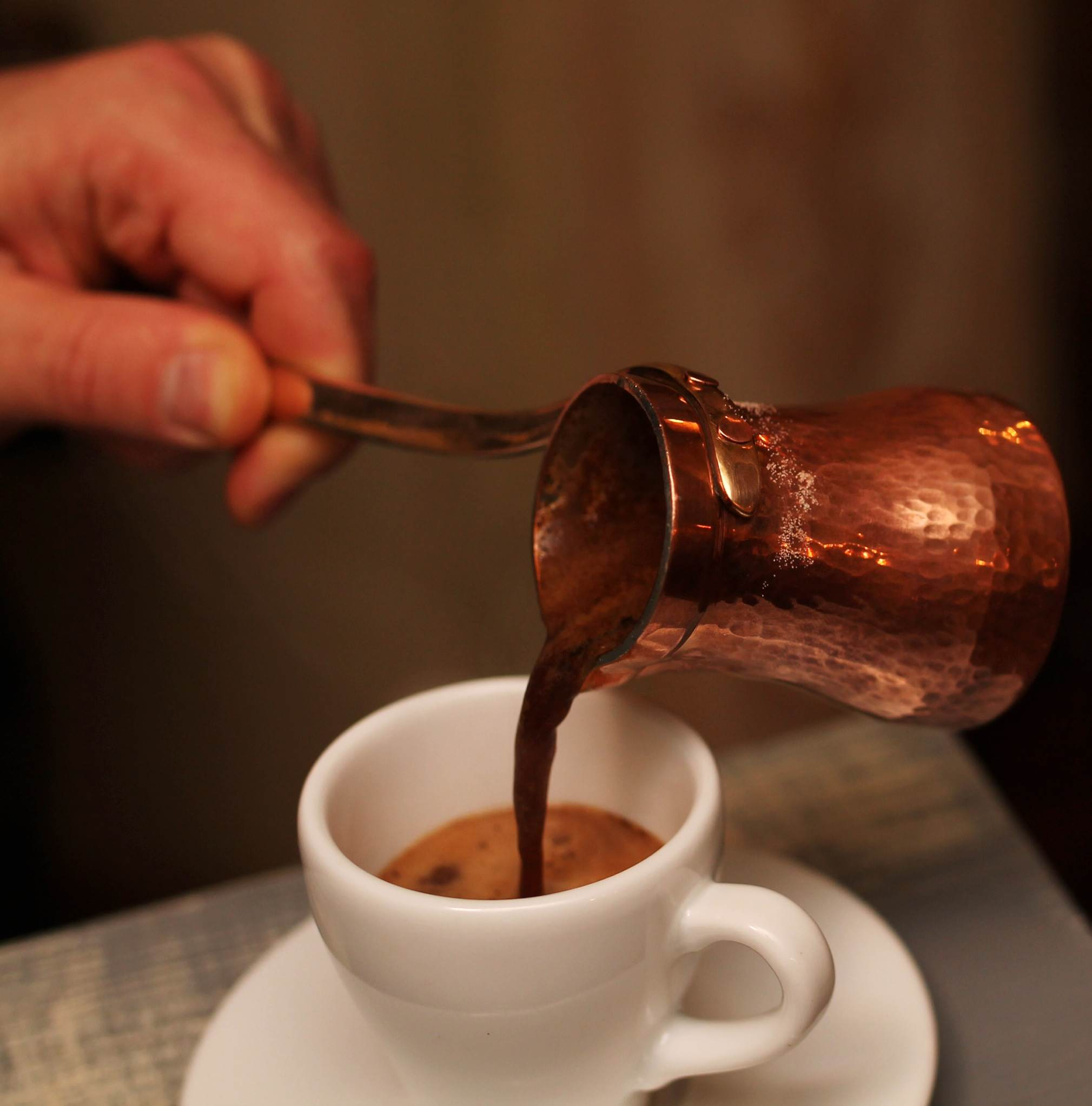
A Turkish cezve, also called a Greek μπρίκι (bríki)

An ibrik is a long-handled metal pot used to make Turkish coffee. The word comes into English from Ottoman Turkish ابریق (ibrik, ıbrık, “ewer”) (modern Turkish ibrik), from Arabic إِبْرِيق (ʔibrīq), ultimately from Persian آب (âb, “water”) + the present stem of the verb ریختن (rêxtan, “to pour”).

Although the Turkish word ibrik, derived from Persian through Arabic, denotes simply a pitcher or ewer, the term is often used in English to mean a Turkish coffee pot, which is known in Turkish as a cezve.

== See also ==
- Cezve (Turkish coffee pot)
- Dallah (Arabic coffee pot)
- Jebena (Ethiopian coffee pot)
- Turkish coffee
