= Cezve =

Traditional pot for making Turkish coffee

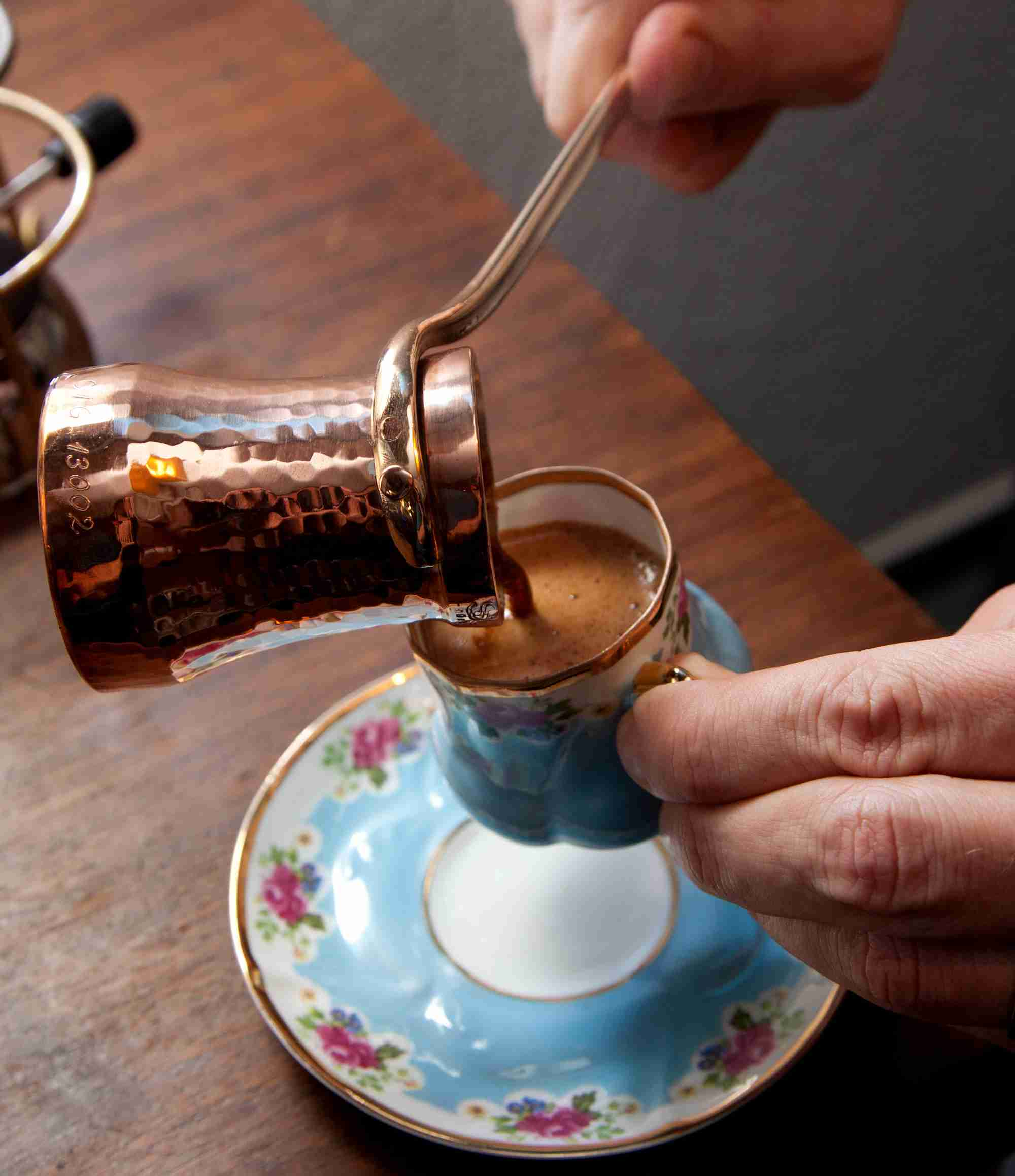
Turkish coffee being poured from a copper cezve

A cezve (Turkish: cezve, pronounced [dʒezˈve]; Serbo-Croatian: džezva / џезва; Macedonian: ѓезве; Arabic: جِذوَة; Bulgarian: джезве, Albanian: xhezve, Hungarian: dzsezva, Slovene: džezva), also ibrik/ibriki (Greek: μπρίκι; Albanian: ibrik, Romanian: ibric, Hungarian: ibrik), srjep (Armenian: սրճեփ), rakwa (Arabic: ركوة), ghallaya (Arabic: غلاية), or kanaka (Arabic: كَنَكَة), is a small long-handled pot with a pouring lip designed specifically to make Turkish coffee. It is traditionally made of brass or copper, occasionally also silver or gold. In more recent times cezveler are also made from stainless steel, aluminium, or ceramics.

== Name ==
The English word cezve was borrowed from Turkish, where it is a borrowing from Arabic: جِذوَة (jadhwa or jidhwa, meaning 'ember').

The cezve is also known as an ibrik, a Turkish word from Arabic إبريق (ʿibrīq). This term was borrowed from medieval Eastern Aramaic forms in ʾaḇrēqā, and originated in New Persian *ābrēž (cf. Farsi ābrēz), from Middle Persian *āb-rēǰ, ultimately from Old Persian *āp- 'water' + *raiča- 'pour' (New Persian ریختن [rêxtan]).

Other variants are ghallaya, briki, rakwa, túrka (Турка) in Russian and kanaka.

== Variations ==
In Albania, Bosnia and Herzegovina, Bulgaria, Croatia, Hungary, Montenegro, North Macedonia, Romania, Serbia, Slovakia and Slovenia, the džezva or ibrik is a long-necked coffee pot. In Turkish an ibrik is not a coffee pot, but simply a pitcher or ewer.

== Gallery ==
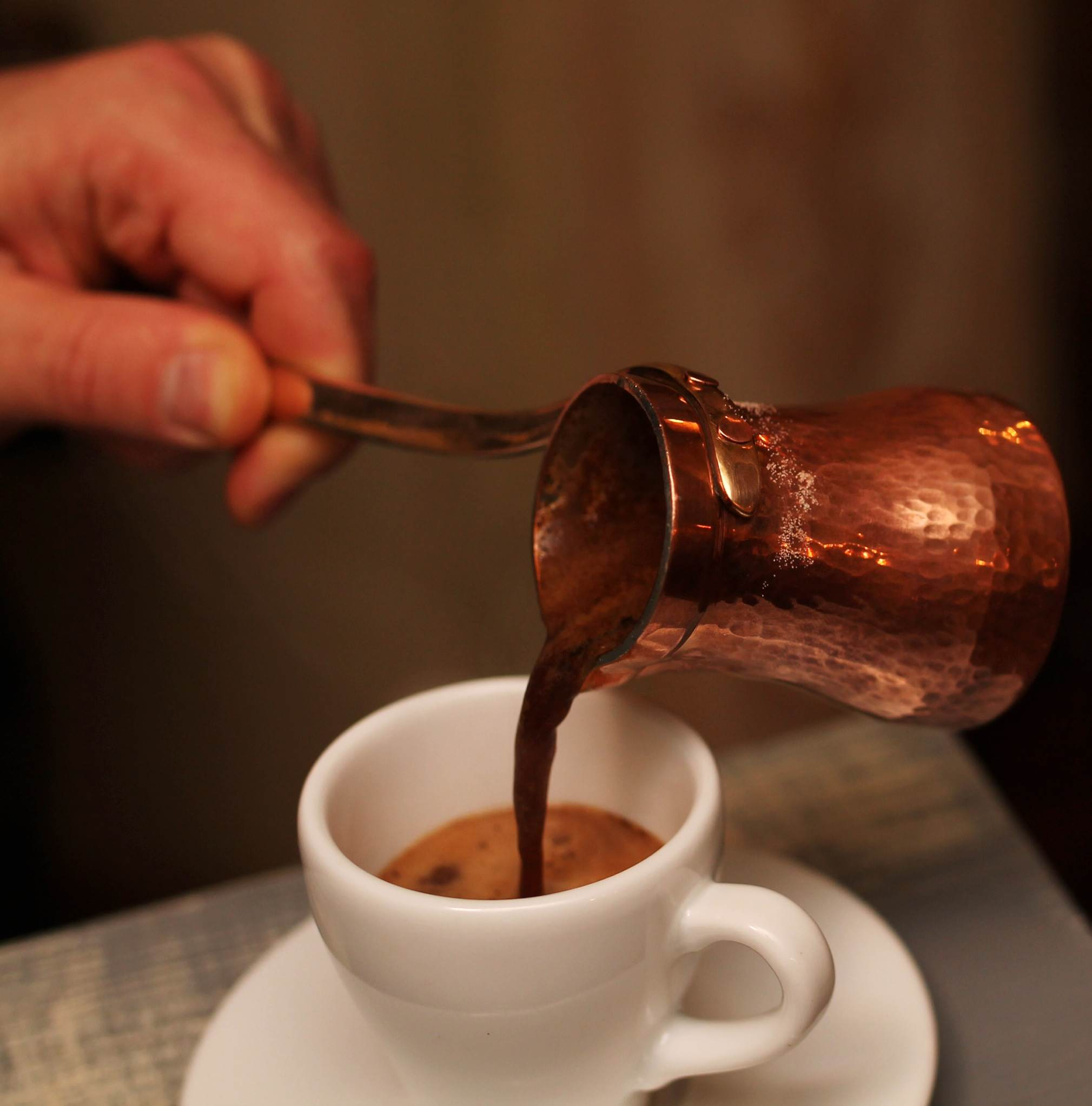
Copper cezve with Turkish coffee pouring out

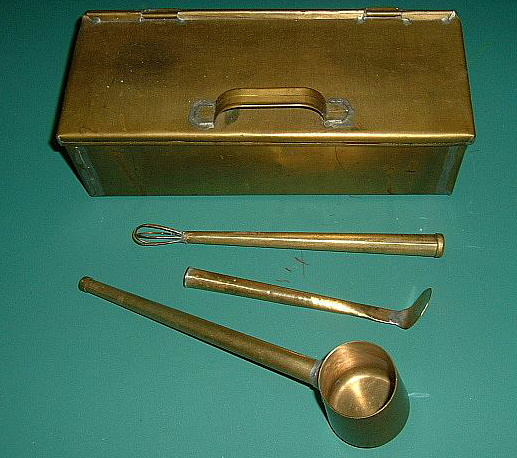
Utensils to prepare Turkish coffee (handmade from Crete). A cezve is at the bottom.

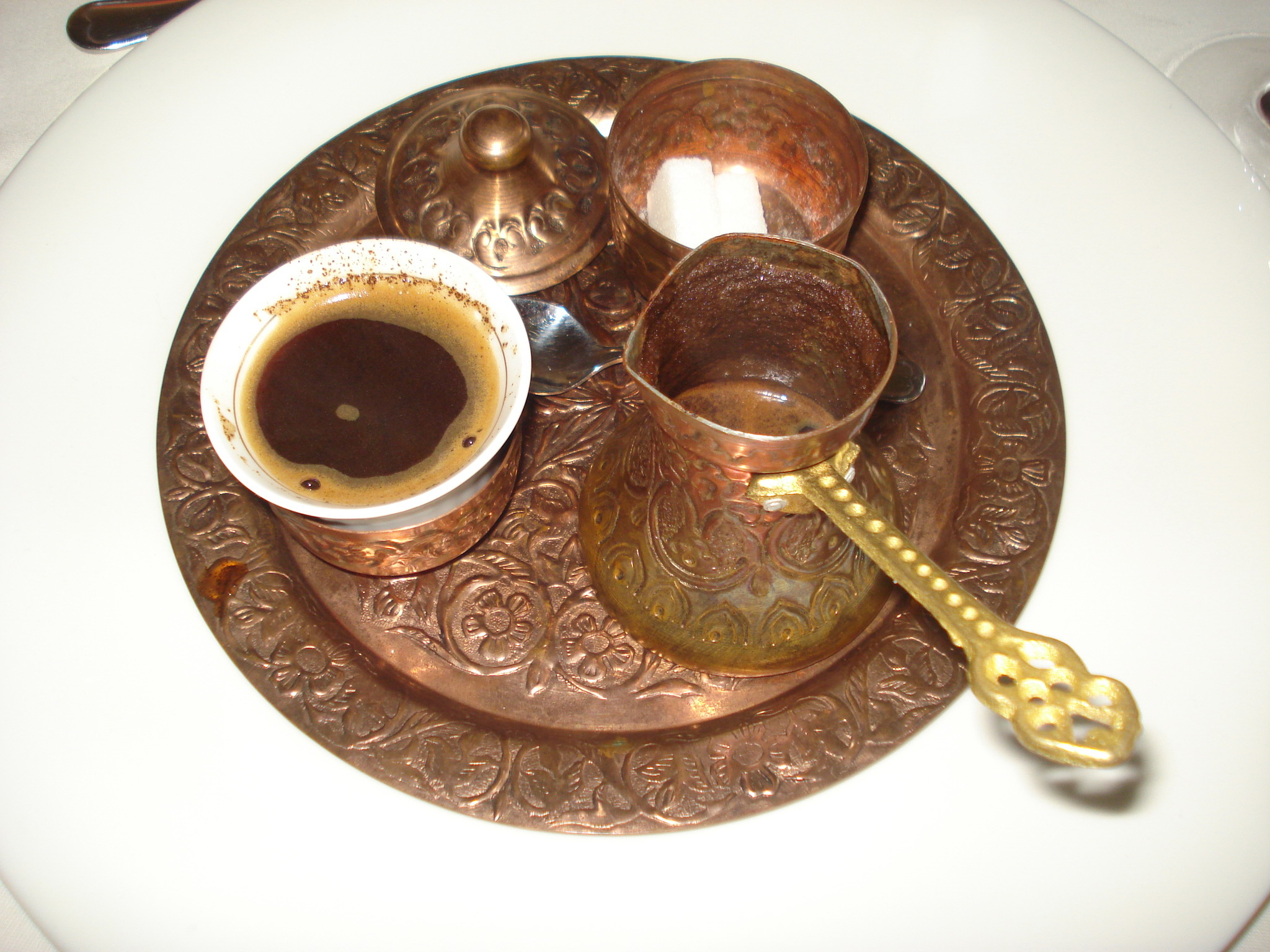
Turkish coffee set containing a cup of coffee, a cezve and a sugar bowl

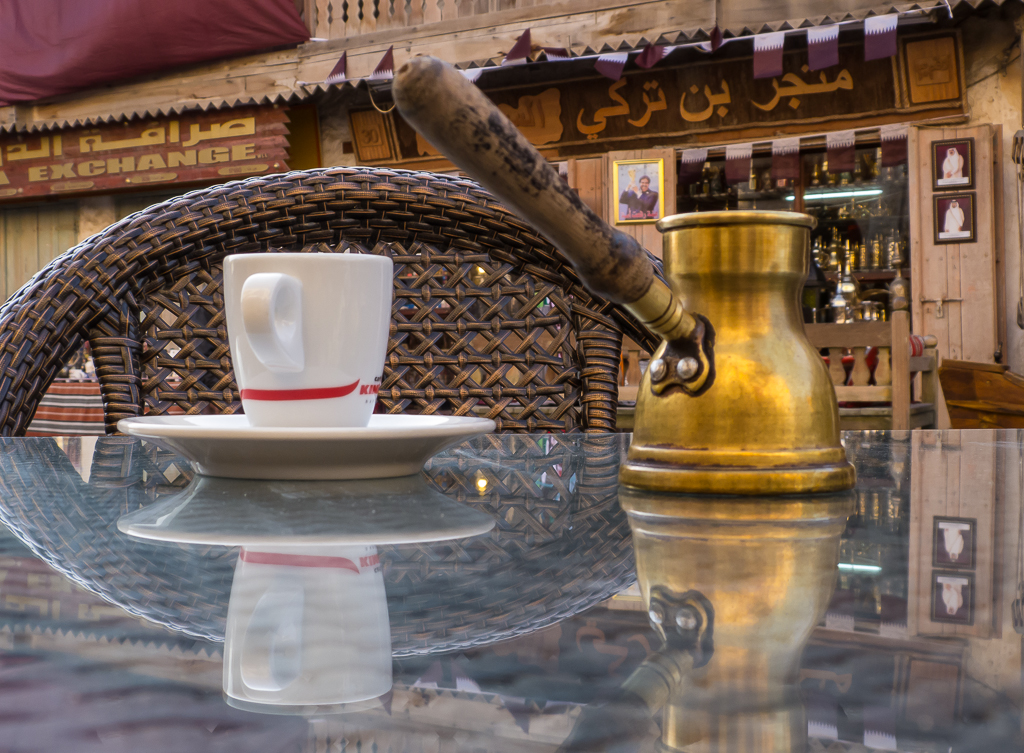
A brass cezve

== See also ==
- Dallah (Arabic coffee pot)
- Jebena (Ethiopian coffee pot)
- Arabic coffee
- Turkish coffee
- List of cooking vessels

== Sources ==
- alt.coffee thread archive regarding cezve word origin
- Comech's cezve page at tamu.edu
