= Nazook =

Armenian dessert

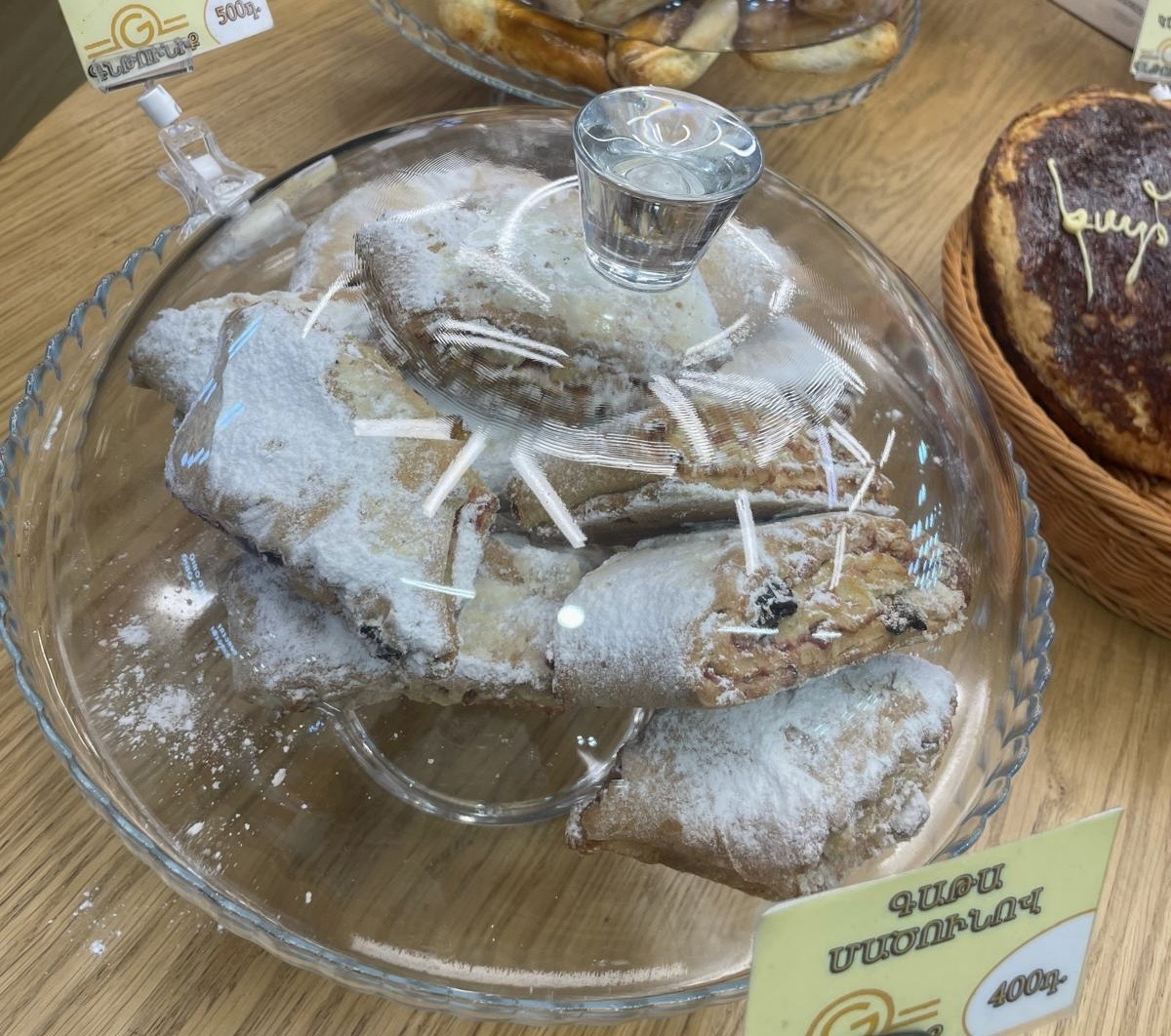
- Nazook
- Type: Dessert
- Place of origin: Armenia
- Main ingredients: Vanilla, sugar, flour, eggs, butter, fruits and nuts

Nazook, nazuk or nazouk, (Armenian Նազուկ) is the name of a rolled Armenian dessert made from flour, butter, sugar, sour cream, yeast, vanilla extract and eggs.

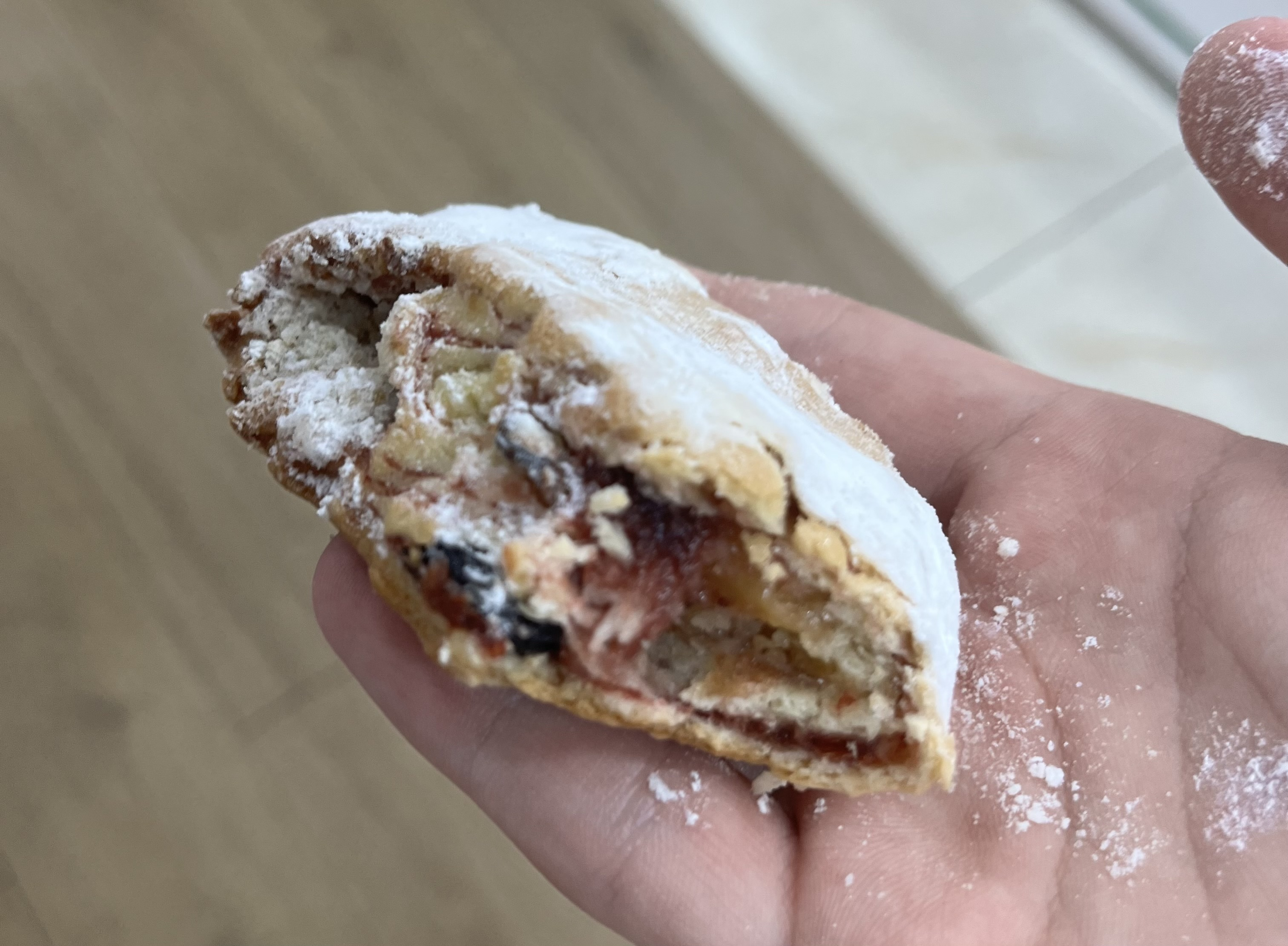
Nazook filled with khoriz and fruits

It is filled with a stuffing called khoriz (խորիզ), made out of butter, sugar and flour, while nuts (walnuts) and fresh, candied, as well as dried fruits (mostly plums, raisins, apricots, peaches, or berries) are often added to the filling as well. Nazook is sometimes referred to as gata. There also is a variation where lemon and cranberries are added to the filling, and a variation where cinnamon becomes the main ingredient for the main filling, essentially turning nazook into a type of cinnamon roll.

== See also ==
- Gata (food)
- List of pastries
