= Gata (food) =

Armenian sweet bread

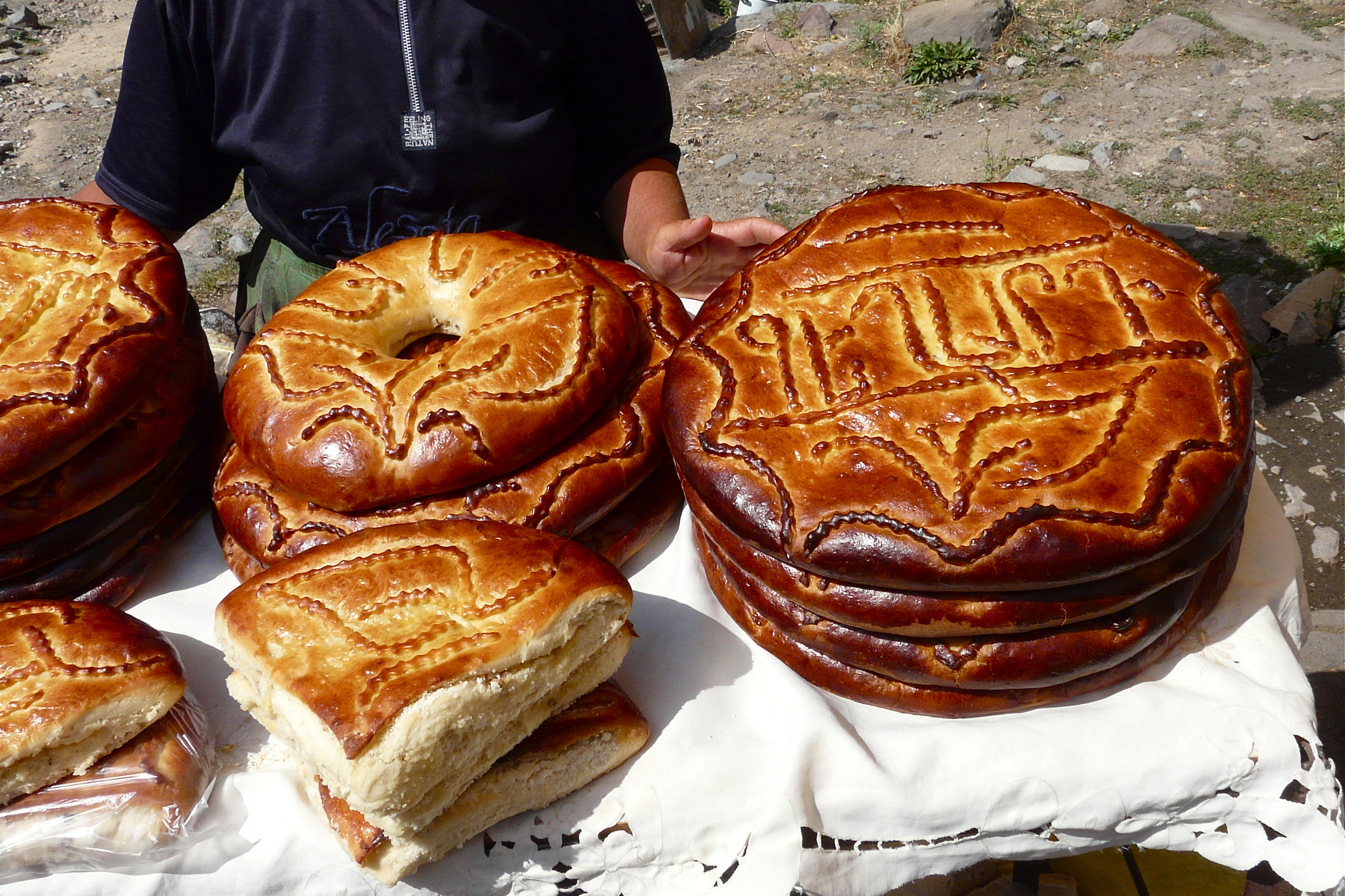
- Type: Bread
- Place of origin: Armenia

Gata (Armenian: գաթա) is an Armenian sweet bread. There are many variations of gata in Armenia. Specific towns or regions have their own versions. Gata is made in a variety of shapes, sizes and may be decorated or left unadorned. In the past, gata was baked in a tonir, but it is now baked in an oven. The bread is traditionally eaten at the feast of Candlemas, but is eaten during other festivities too or simply eaten with a cup of tea or coffee.

One popular variety of it is koritz (khoriz), which has a filling that consists of flour, butter and sugar. Gata can also include other fillings alongside khoritz, including nuts, (most commonly walnuts, while peanuts can also be used), dried fruits, lemons, or mulberries. Some variations include placing a coin inside the dough before the gata is baked, and it is said that whoever receives the piece with the coin is to be blessed with good fortune. Gata from the villages of Garni and Geghard are decorated (before baking), round, and generally about a foot in diameter. Around the southern edge of Lake Sevan, in the town of Tsovinar, gata is denser and sweeter, and baked without koritz in a triangular shape without decoration.

The preparation of gata and its cultural expressions are included in the intangible cultural heritage list of Armenia.

== Different types of Gata ==
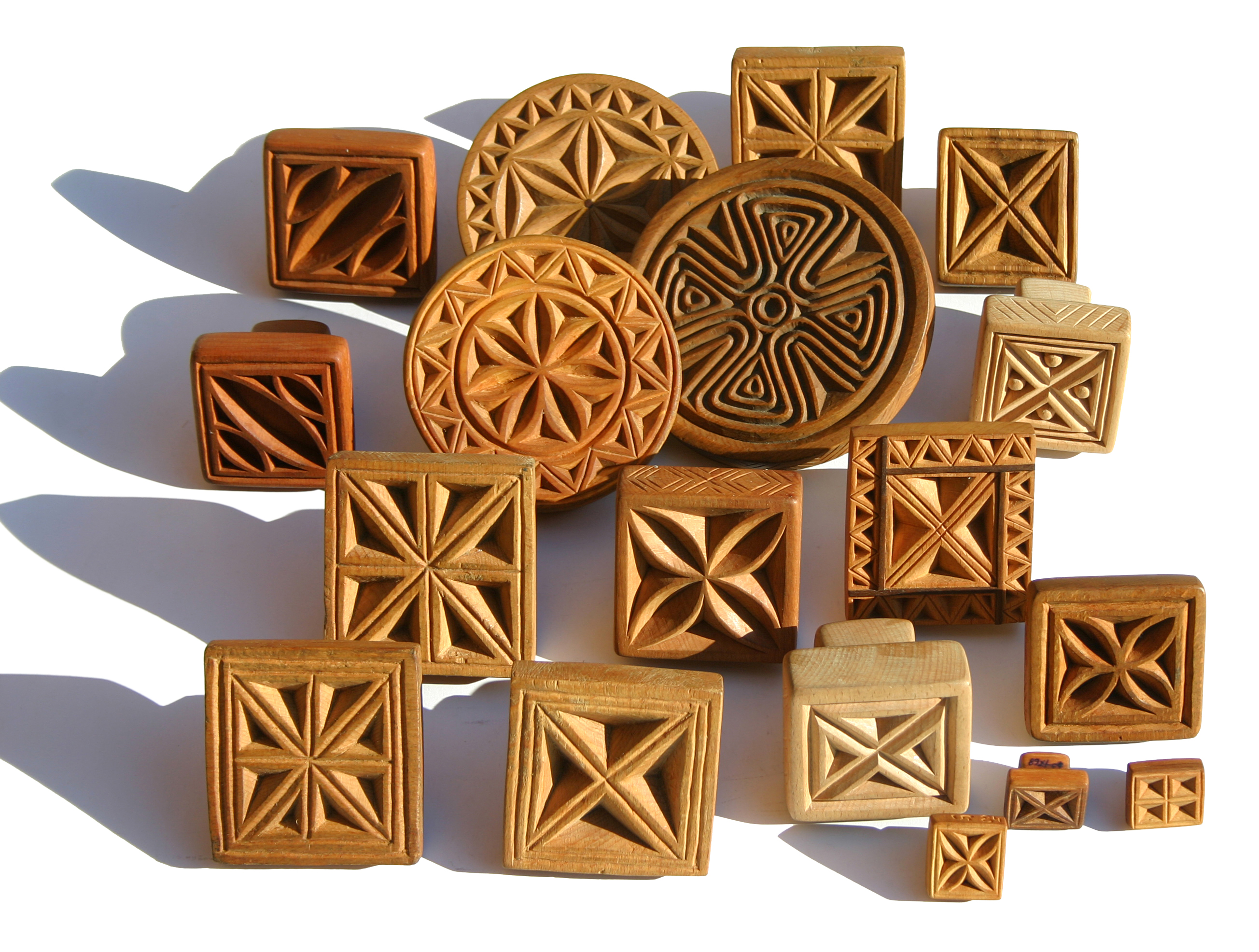
Gata stamps used to print motifs on Gata

Some Gata resemble croissants, made from an enriched bread dough rolled into paper-thin, table-wide sheets using an “okhlavoo” (a wooden dowel dedicated to dough work), smeared with butter, rolled up like a carpet and cut into spirals that bake up layered and crisp. This style is often called Nazook. Others are sweeter and decidedly more cake-like, whether they're made with a yeast- or baking soda/acidic dairy-leavened dough (baking powder was, until very recently, unknown in Armenia, so most chemically-leavened baked goods are made using a combination of baking soda and an acidic dairy like yogurt or sour cream). This latter style is usually formed into a flattened disc and filled with a single layer of butter, flour, sugar, vanilla, and (sometimes) chopped nut paste known as khoritz, a mixture that's essentially the Armenian equivalent of Strudel. Special gata-stamps that are called Gatanakhshich (գաթանախշիչ) are used to print motifs on Gata, while inscriptions are most often handmade. The more simple gata are often dressed up with decorative strips of dough or by scoring patterns onto the top before baking.

The following styles of Gata can be found in Eastern Armenia and Karabakh (Artsakh):

- Stepanavan (Gugark) Gata.
- Gyumri (Leninakan) Gata.
- Yerevan Gata.
- Vanadzor (Kirovakan) Gata.
- Gavar Gata.
- Geghard Gata.
- Karabakh (Artsakh) Gata.

Gata is also prepared by Assyrians, who call it Chada or Kadeh.

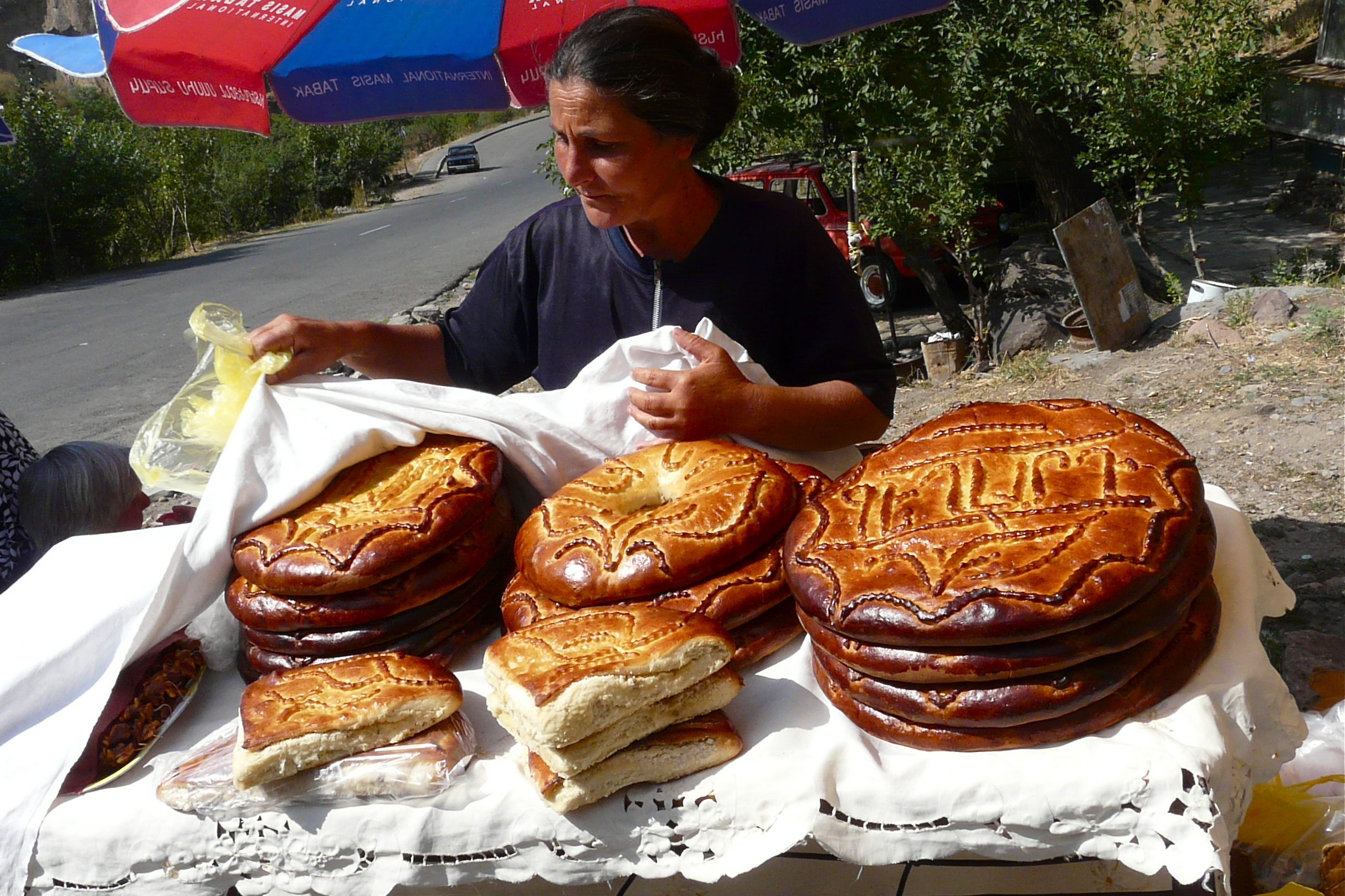
Armenian woman selling Gata

== In culture ==
Gata is traditionally eaten during various feasts. For example, during the Christian holiday of Candlemas, or during Lent in Armenia.

== See also ==
- Nazook
- Qatlama
