= Russian tea culture =

Use of tea in Russia

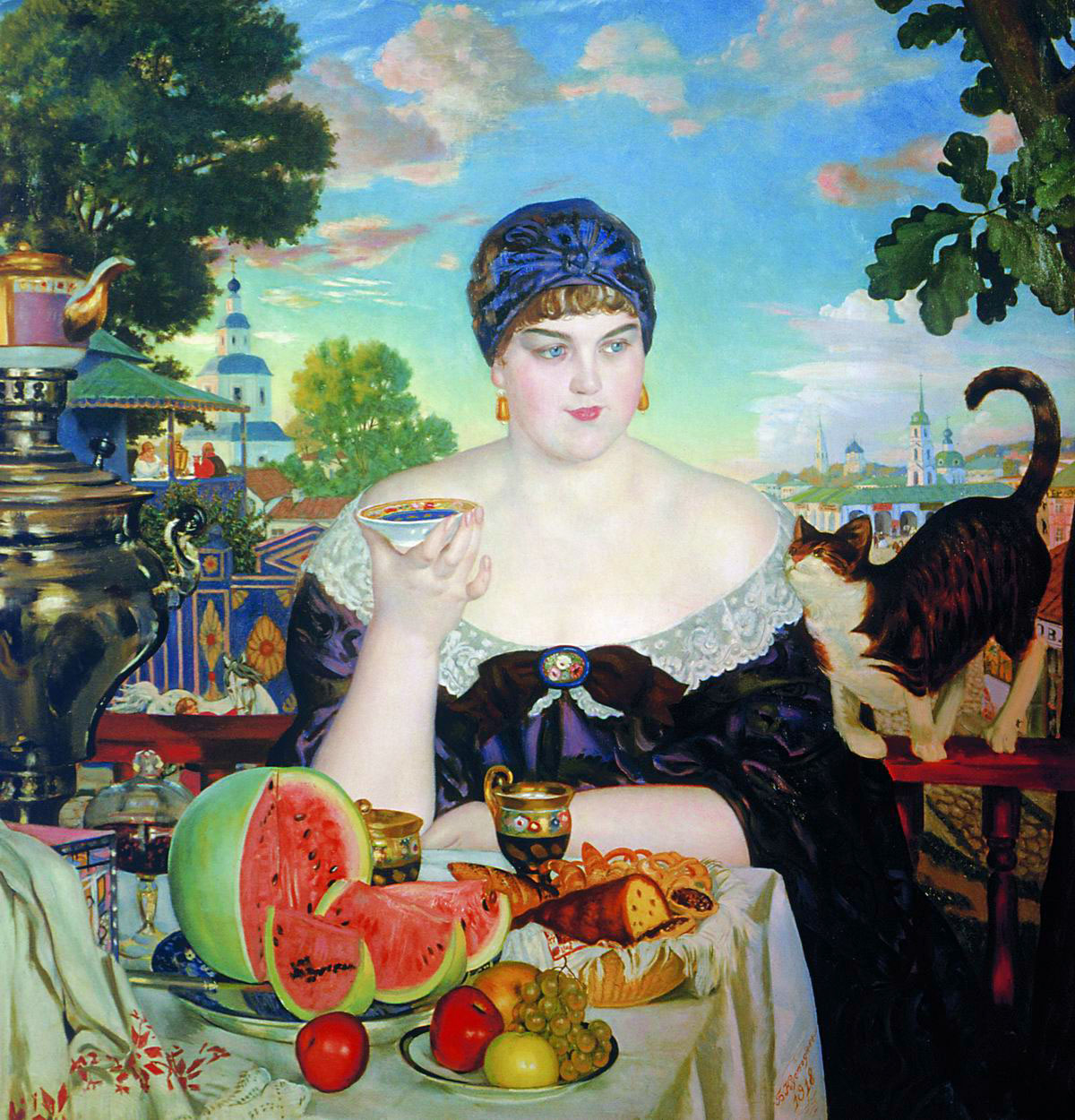
The Merchant's Wife. Boris Kustodiev, 1918

Tea is an important part of Russian culture. Due in part to Russia's cold northern climate, it is today considered the de facto national beverage, one of the most popular beverages in the country, and is closely associated with traditional Russian culture. Russian tea is brewed and can be served sweet, and hot or cold. It is traditionally taken at afternoon tea, but has since spread as an all day drink, especially at the end of meals, served with dessert. A notable aspect of Russian tea culture is the samovar, which was widely used to boil water for brewing until the middle of the 20th century.

== History ==
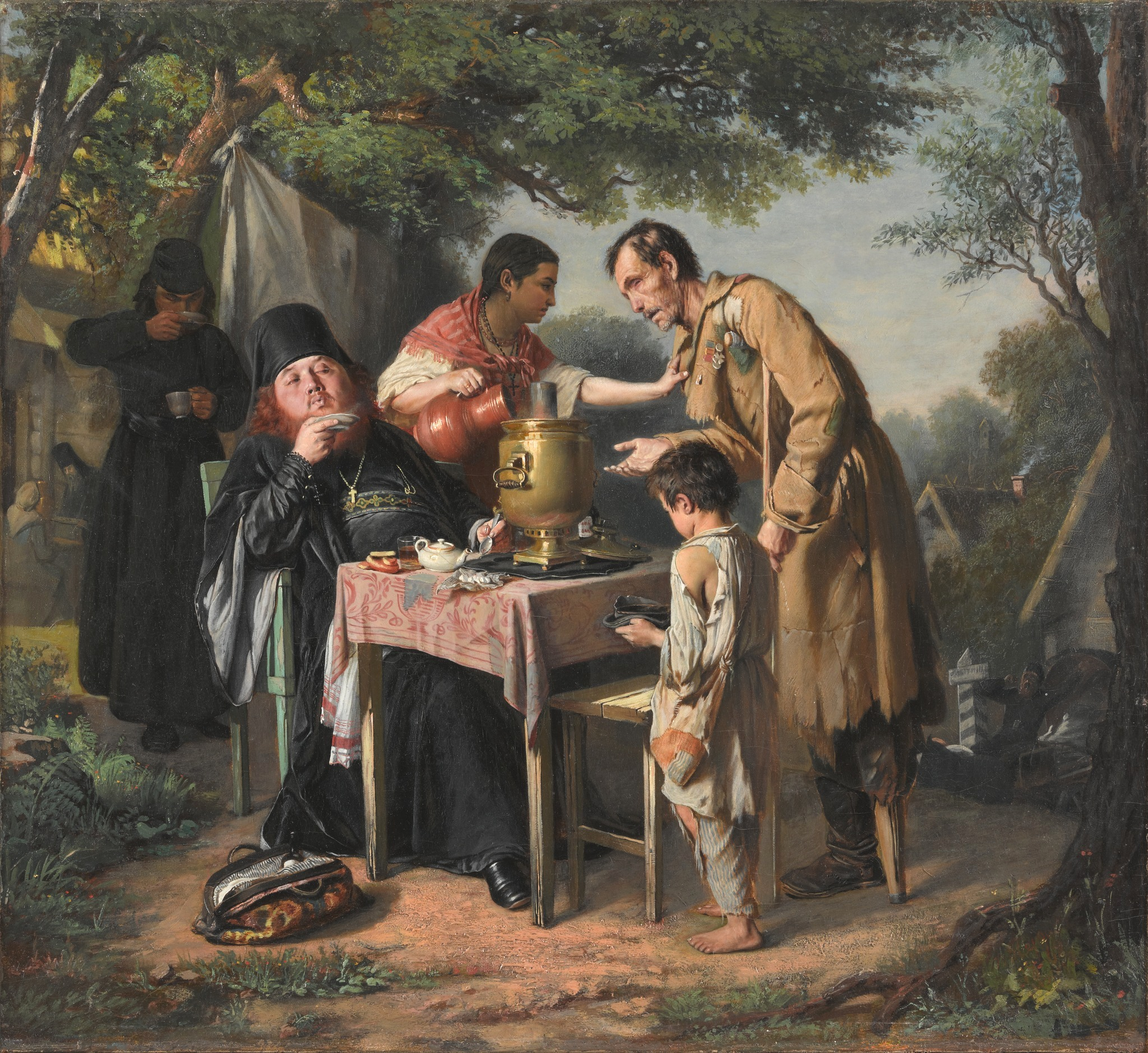
A Tea Party in Mytishchi. Vasily Perov, 1862

There is a widespread legend claiming that Russians first came in contact with tea in 1567 when the Cossack atamans Petrov and Yalyshev visited Ming China. This was popularized in the popular and widely-read Tales of the Russian People by Ivan Sakharov, but modern historians generally consider the manuscript to be fake and the embassy of Petrov and Yalyshev itself is fictional.

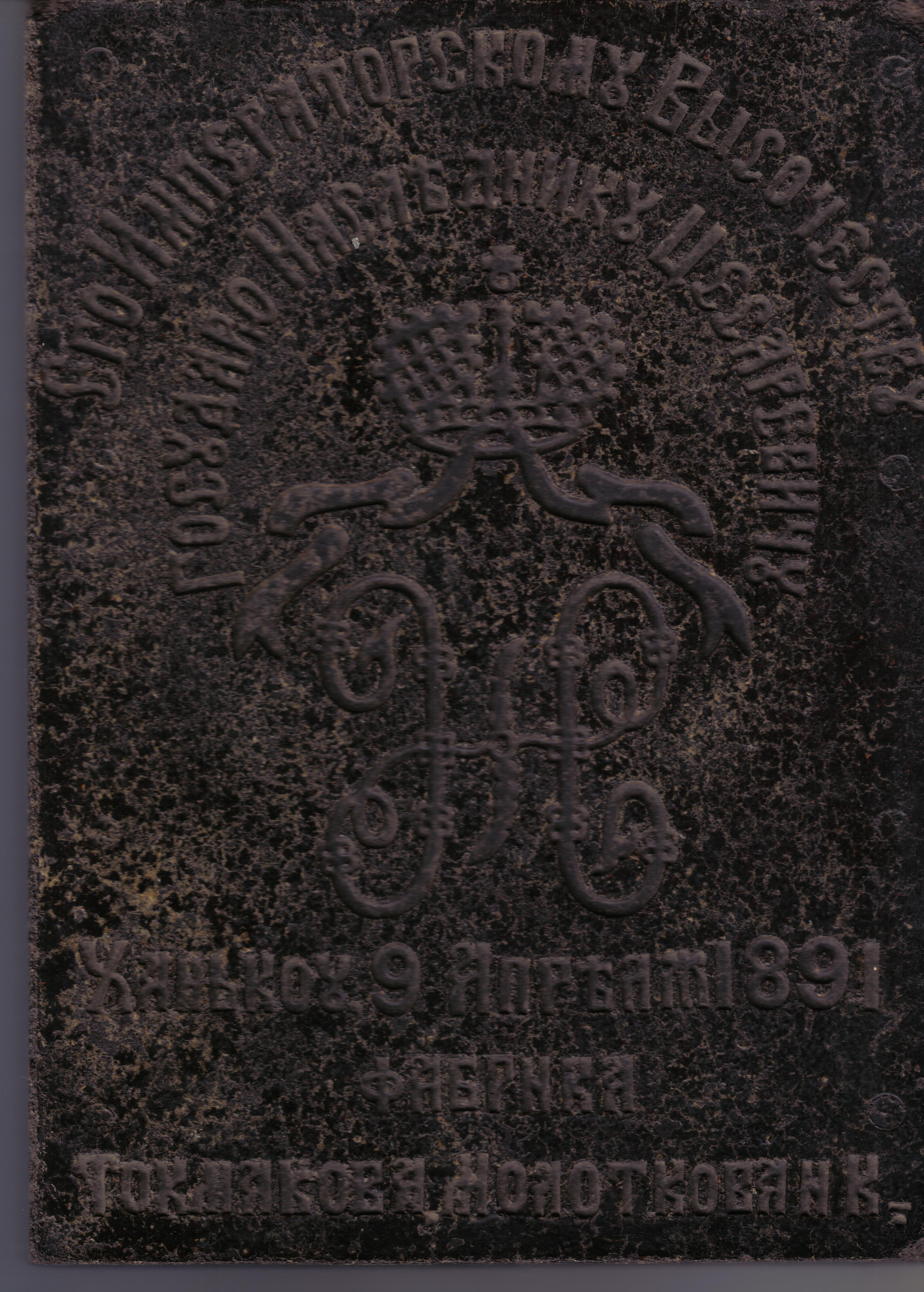
A brick of tea presented to Crown Prince Nicholas (future Tsar Nicholas II), 1891

Tea culture accelerated in 1638 when a Mongolian ruler donated four poods (65–70 kg) of tea to Tsar Michael . According to Jeremiah Curtin, it was possibly in 1636 that Vassili Starkov was sent as envoy to the Altan Khan of the Khalkha. As a gift to the Tsar, he was given 250 pounds of tea. Starkov at first refused, seeing no use for a load of dead leaves, but the Khan insisted. Thus, tea was introduced to Russia. In 1679, Russia concluded a treaty on regular tea supplies from China via camel train in exchange for furs. The Qing ambassador to Moscow made a gift of several chests of tea to Alexis I. However, the difficult trade route made the cost of tea extremely high so the beverage became available only to royalty and the very wealthy. In 1689, the Treaty of Nerchinsk was signed that formalized Russia's sovereignty over Siberia, and also marked the creation of the Tea Road that traders used between Russia and China.

Between the Treaty of Nerchinsk and the Treaty of Kyakhta (1727), Russia would increase its caravans going to China for tea, but only through state dealers. In 1706, Peter the Great made trading in Beijing illegal. In 1786, Catherine the Great re-established regular tea imports. By the time of Catherine's death in 1796, Russia was importing more than three million pounds by camel train in the form of loose tea and tea bricks, enough tea to considerably lower the price so that middle and lower class Russians could afford the beverage.

The word “tea” in Russian was first encountered in medical texts of the mid-17th century, for example, in “Materials for the history of medicine in Russia”: “herbs for tea; ramon color (?) - 3 handfuls each” (issue 2, No. 365, 1665, 291), “boiled chage (probably chaje or the same, but through the Greek “scale”) to a leaf of Khinskiy (typo: khanskiy)”.

The peak year for the Kiakhta tea trade was in 1824, and the peak year for the tea caravans was 1860. From then, they started to decline when the first leg of the Trans-Siberian Railway was completed in 1880. Faster train service reduced the time it took for tea to arrive in Russia from 16 months to seven weeks. The decline in Chinese tea in the mid 19th century in turn meant that Russia began to import more tea from Odessa, and London. By 1905, horse-drawn tea transport had ended. By 1925, caravan as the sole means of transport for tea had ended. In 2002, Russia imported some 162,000 metric tons of tea.

By the late 19th century, Wissotzky Tea had become the most prominent tea firm in the Russian Empire. By the early 20th century, Wissotzky was the largest tea manufacturer in the world.

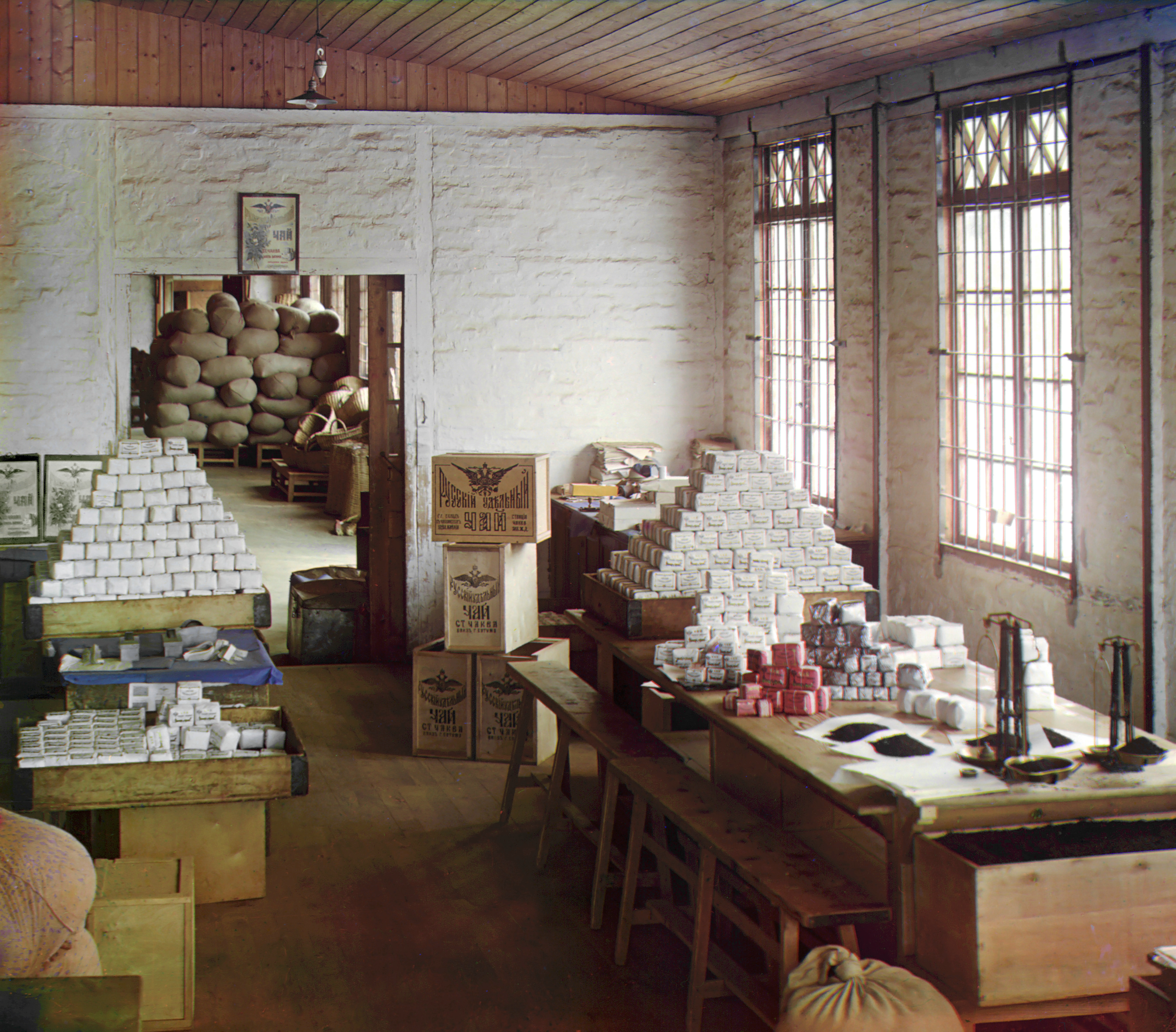
Tea packaging in Batumi, Russian Empire, early 20th century.

Tea prices had moderately declined by the end of the 18th century. The first local tea plant was set in Nikitsky Botanical Garden in 1814, while the first industrial tea plantation was established in 1885. The tea industry did not take off until World War I, and greatly expanded following World War II. However, by the mid-1990s, tea production came to a standstill. Today, the main area in Russia for tea production is near Sochi.

== Varieties ==
Traditionally, black tea is the most common tea in Russia, but green tea is becoming popular too.

Traditional tea in Russia includes the traditional type known as Russian Caravan as it was originally imported from China via camel caravan. As the trip was very long, usually taking as long as sixteen to eighteen months, the tea acquired its distinctive smoky flavor from the caravan's campfires. Today, this tea is often given its smoky flavor after oxidation or is a keemun or a "black or oolong from southern China or Formosa (Taiwan) with a hint of smoky Lapsang Souchong or Tarry Souchong."

It is common, particularly in the countryside, to add herbs and berries to the leaves, such as mint, melissa, blackcurrant leaves, St. John's wort, raspberries, or sweet briar hips. Sometimes, fireweed is used to replace tea leaves altogether.

== Brewing and serving ==
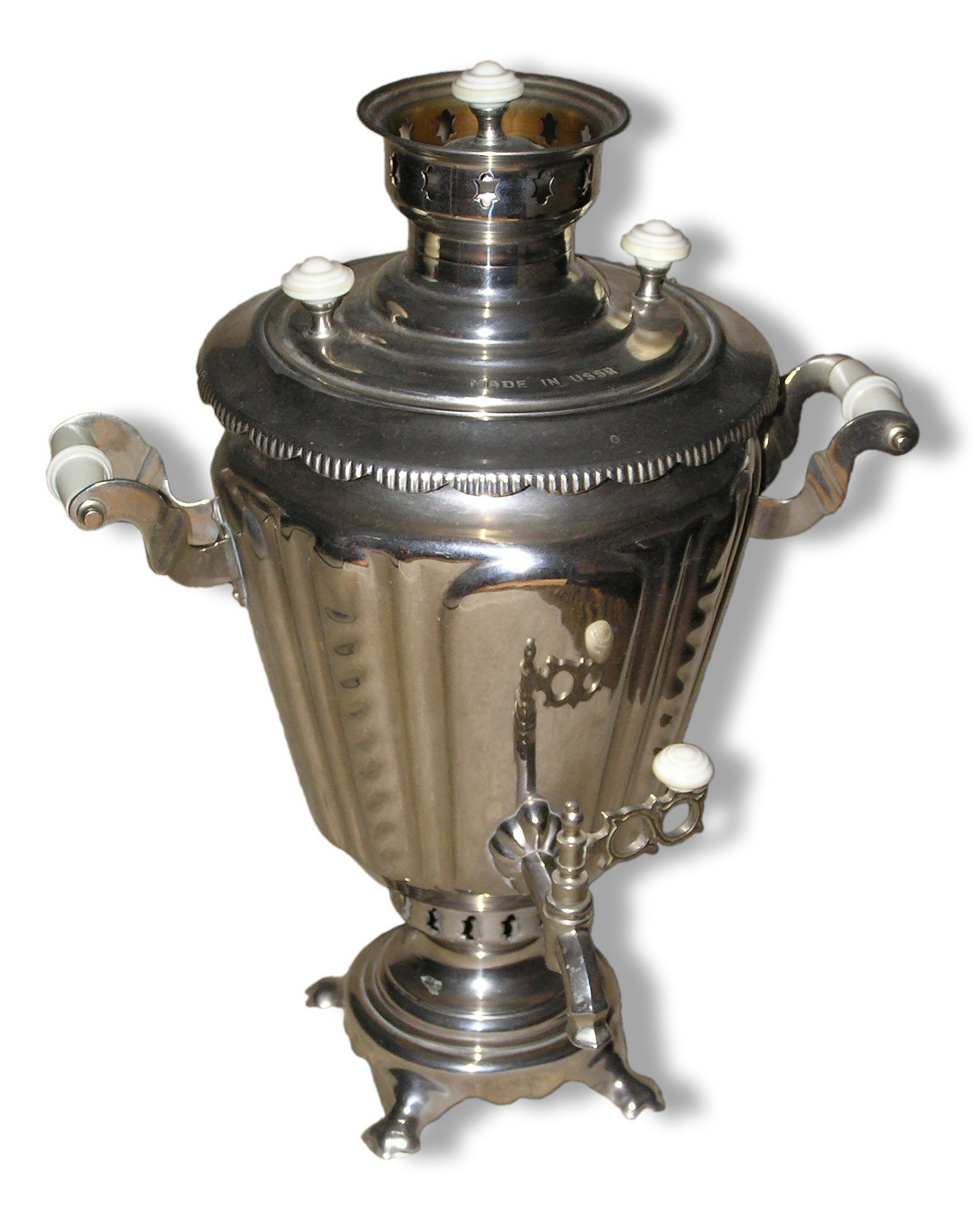
Silver samovar

A notable feature of Russian tea culture is the two-step brewing process. First, tea concentrate called zavarka (Russian: заварка) is prepared: a quantity of dry tea sufficient for several persons is brewed in a small teapot. Then, each person pours some quantity of this concentrate into the cup and mixes it with hot and cold water; thus, one can make one's tea as strong and as hot as one wants, according to one's taste. Sugar, lemon, honey, jam or milk can then be added freely. Sugar and other sweeteners are served in bowls; using the personal teaspoon to add them to the tea rather than the one in the bowl is considered impolite.

Zavarka can be brewed from the same leaves up to three times, but this is generally recognized to dilute and thus spoil the taste, unless it is green tea being brewed.

In the History of the Great War, British military observers wrote that tea is a popular drink alongside vodka, adding that the Russians prepared a weak infusion before adding jam made of 'tundra berries' presumably to prevent scurvy.

Tea sachets are widely popular in Russia, but less so than the world average, taking up about 50% of the Russian market compared to the 90% worldwide. While the simplicity of brewing such tea makes it popular for quick tea breaks, it is generally thought to be inferior to loose leaf tea brewed into zavarka both in the quality of the leaves available in mass-market brands and the quality of extraction during the brewing process itself.

A samovar was widely used to boil water for brewing until mid-20th century, when the spread of gas stoves in then-newly mass-constructed apartment buildings largely saw it replaced with kettles. From the 1990s, electric kettles have become the norm.

Drinking tea is an integral part of every Russian meal; it is served with dessert. Pastries, confectioneries, and varenye are rarely consumed while not accompanied by tea, and vice versa, such sweet products are commonly categorized as something "к чаю"—"to add to the tea". A tea party is also universally a part of a festive meal: meat and other savory food is then served as the first course, and tea serves as the second, normally accompanied by a large cake. There is no formal ceremony to drinking tea, on the contrary, tea-drinking is considered to be the best time for small talk. The end of drinking tea then also signals the end of the meal.

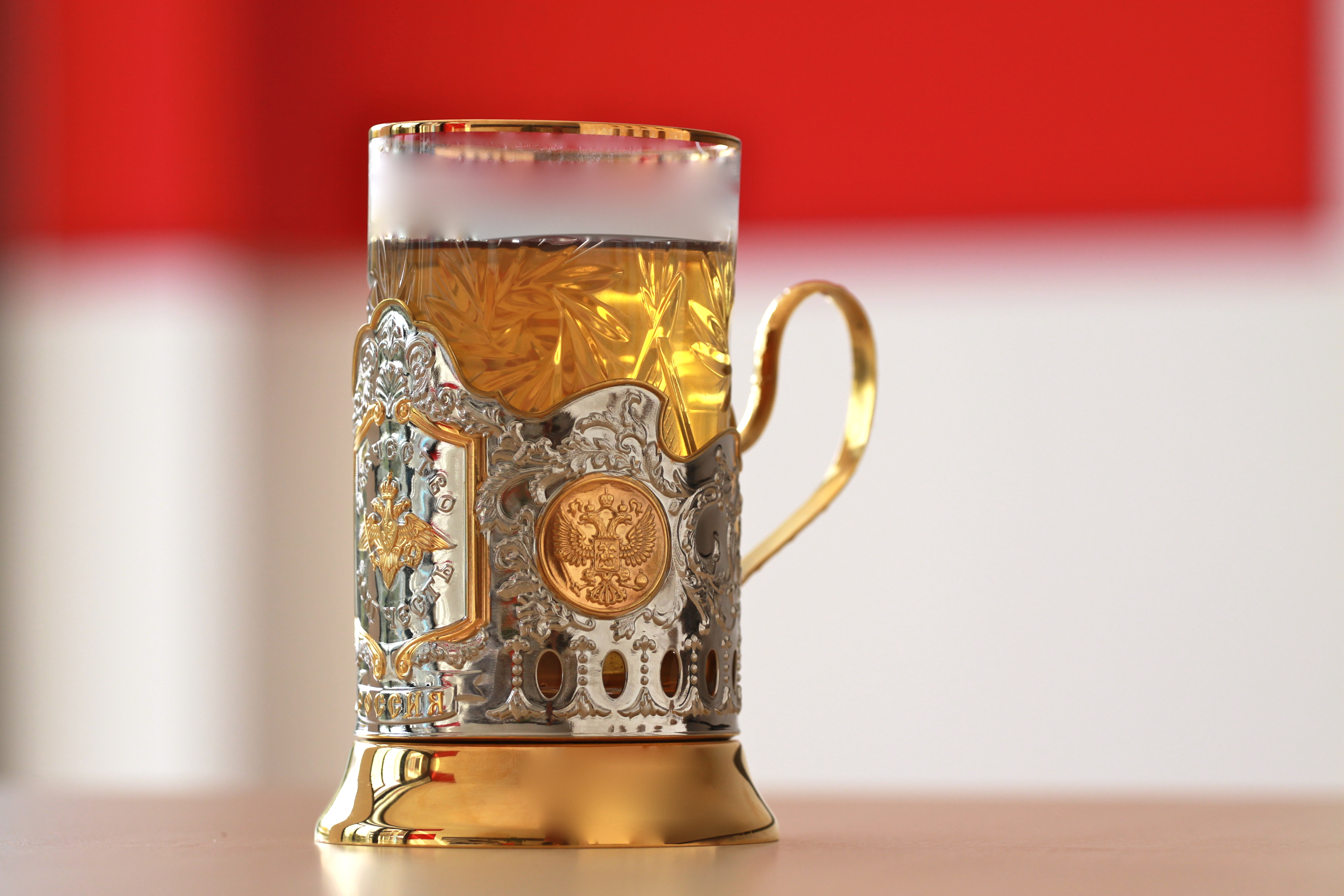
A glass of tea inside a Podstakannik, a gilded glass holder.

Conversely, a tea time can also be had separately from a meal. Tea parties can be formal occasions on their own, and it is not uncommon for Russians to be sipping tea throughout the day. Furthermore, tea is offered as a form of courtesy to guests, even on short visits, especially when it is cold outside. Office culture in particular includes not just tea breaks, but tea served during lengthy meetings, and offered wherever a visitor has to wait any meaningful amount of time. On such occasions, tea is usually brewed in satchels, and accompanied by nothing but sugar and maybe a single pastry variety.

On formal occasions, tea is enjoyed from porcelain or faïence teacups with matching saucers; such teacups are rarely larger than 200 to 250 ml. While it is not a hard etiquette requirement, it is considered good taste for teacups to come from a single set for everyone at the table. Thus, many Russian families have a tea set set aside especially for festive and formal occasions. Russian porcelain factories offer a wide range of such tea sets, the Imperial Porcelain Factory cobalt blue net design with 22 karat gold in particular considered something of a household name.

In more casual situations, tea can be drunk from any cups or mugs, their size reaching up to half a liter or even more. If the beverage in the cup is excessively hot, it is considered permissible—but not polite—to sip it from the saucer. Glasses are rarely used for tea consumption, other than on the railroads, where the traditional combination of a glass (sometimes a Soviet-style faceted one) and a glass holder is served by any conductor on demand, to be brewed with the hot water available from the tea urn found at the end of the carriage.

== Tea culture ==
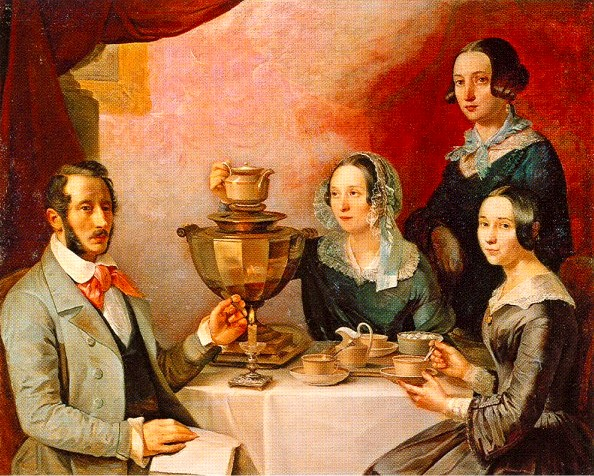
Family portrait in Russia in 1844 by T. Myagkov, with the samovar ready for tea

According to William Pokhlyobkin, tea in Russia was not regarded as a self-dependent beverage; thus, even the affluent classes adorned it with a jam, syrup, cakes, cookies, candies, lemon and other sweets. This is similar to the archaic idiom "чай да сахар" (tea and sugar, translit. chay da sakhar). The Russian language utilizes some colloquialisms pertaining to tea consumption, including "чайку-с?" ("some tea?" in an archaic manner, translit. chayku s), used by the pre-Revolutionary attendants. The others are "гонять чаи" (chase the teas, i.e. drinking the tea for overly prolonged periods; translit. gonyat' chaii) and "побаловаться чайком" (indulging in tea, translit. pobalovat'sya chaykom). Tea was made a significant element of cultural life by the literati of the Karamzinian circle. By the mid-19th century tea had won over the town class, the merchants and the petty bourgeoisie. This is reflected in the dramas of Alexander Ostrovsky. Since Ostrovsky's time, the duration of time and the amount of tea consumed have appreciated.

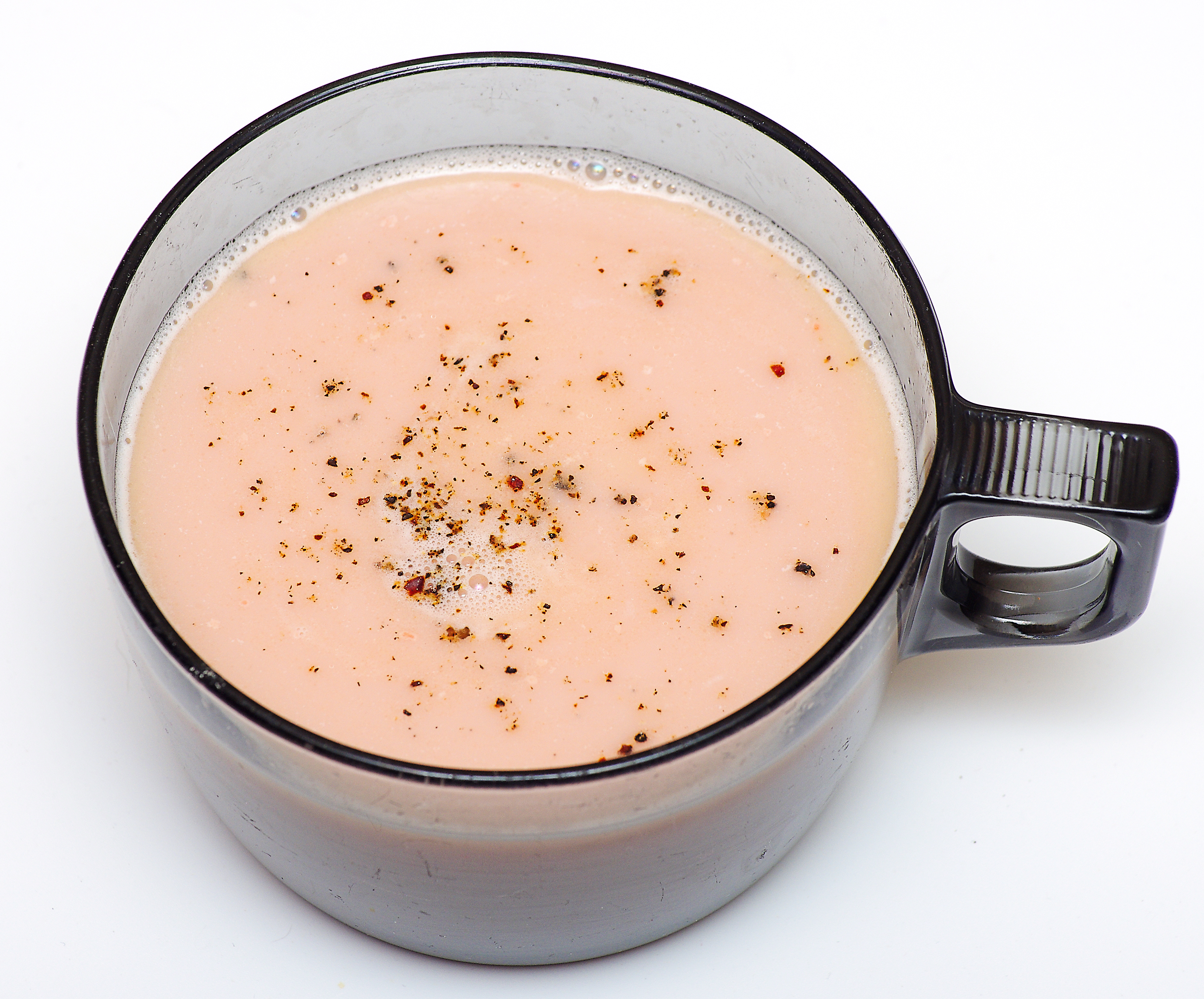
Kalmyk tea with butter and pepper

In the Soviet period, tea-drinking was extremely popular in the daily life of office workers (female secretaries, laboratory assistants, etc.). Tea brands of the time were nicknamed "the brooms" (Georgian) and "the tea with an elephant" (Indian). Tea was an immutable element of kitchen life among the intelligentsia in 1960s-'70s.

In pre-Revolutionary Russia there was a joke "что после чаю следует?" ('what follows after tea?', translit. chto poslye chayu slyeduyet) with the correct answer being "the resurrection of the dead" from the Nicene Creed. This is based on the word "чаю" (chayu), the homograph designating formerly "I expect" ("look for" in the creed) and the partitive case of the word "tea", still in use.

In the 19th century, Russians drank their tea with a cube of sugar (from sugarloaf) held between their teeth. The tradition still exists today.

Tea is very popular in Russian prisons. Traditional mind-altering substances such as alcohol are typically prohibited, and very high concentrations, called chifir are used as a substitute.

Russian citizens who are not ethnically Russian have their own tea cultures. Kalmyk tea, for instance, most resembles Mongolian suutei tsai, and includes brewing loose leaves with milk (twice larger amount than that of water), salt, bay leaf, nutmeg, cloves, or butter, to be consumed with flatbread. Water substituted with milk allows the beverage to be produced more easily in the arid terrain of Kalmykia.

== "Russian Tea" in other countries ==
=== United States ===
There is a beverage called "Russian Tea" which likely originated in America. This drink is especially popular in the Southeastern United States where it is traditionally served at social events during Advent and Christmastide. Recipes vary, but the most common ingredients are loose black tea, orange juice (or orange peel), cinnamon, and cloves; some recipes use instant tea powder. Other juices such as lemon and pineapple are sometimes called for. Cream may also be added when serving. A homemade 'instant' variety, often using Tang, has become a popular stocking stuffer in recent decades.

The drink is served hot and often an evening or after-meal beverage. However, iced versions are sometimes offered with meals at cafés.

Despite the name, "Russian Tea" probably has no link to its namesake. References to "Russian Tea" and instructions have been found in American newspapers and cookbooks dating as early as the 1880s.

=== Japan ===
In Japan, the term "Russian tea" is used to refer specifically to the act of having black tea with a spoonful of jam, whether added into the cup or placed on the tongue before drinking. The typical choice is strawberry jam, but not exclusively so.

== See also ==
- Tea culture
- Coffee culture

== Bibliography ==
- Audra Jo Yoder, Myth and Memory in Russian Tea Culture, «Studies in Slavic Cultures», Issue VIII, August 2009.
