= Kolchug-Mizar =

Russian tableware manufacturer

Logo of JSC TH Kolchug-Mizar

Russian tableware plant Kolchug-Mizar is the largest manufacturer of tableware, plate and cutlery in Russia. It was founded in 1871. The plant is situated not far from Moscow (Kolchugino, Vladimir region). Kolchugino plant is well-known most because of popular kolchugino tea glass-holders or podstakanniks (Russian: подстаканник).

== History ==
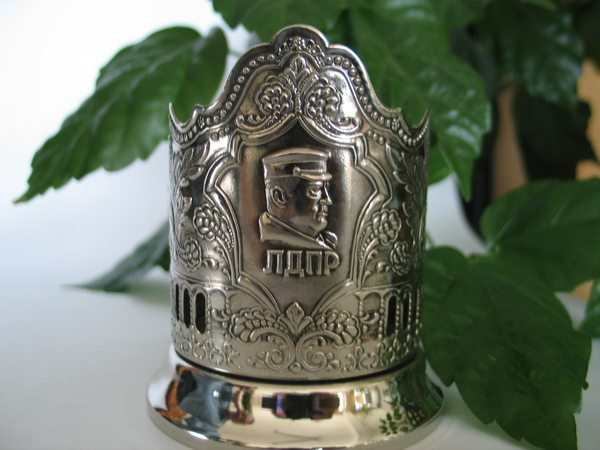
Russian Kolchugino glass holder with V.V.Jirinovsky

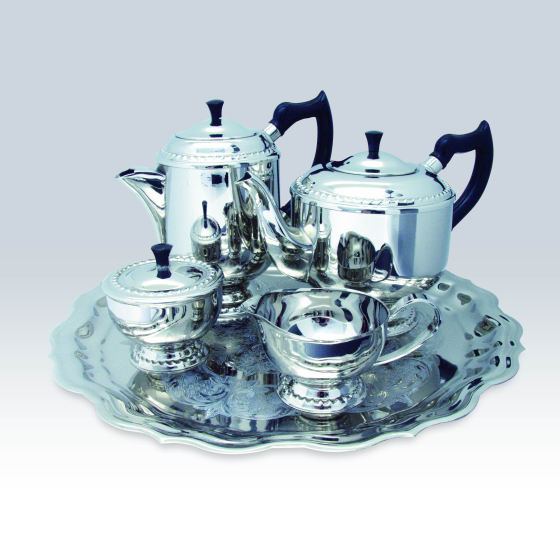
Russian Kolchugino plate, named Kolchugin

In 1871 Alexander Kolchugin, a merchant, acquired two copper-flattening plants situated at a distance of 130 kilometers from Moscow which marked the beginning of over 130-year history of today's Kolchugino Plant of the Non-Ferrous Metals.

In the first thirty years there were built a brass department with a steam-engine (250 horsepower) and six rolling mills; copper-rolling department with a steam-engine (200 horsepower) and five rolling mills; departments for brass and tough-pitch copper casting; cast iron and machine shops, a forge. Such manufacturing capabilities gave an opportunity of manufacturing more than 12 types of non-ferrous metal products.

In 1896 the first trial power plant was put into operation. After putting into operation a four-storied department for winepress and a powerful rolling mill it was arranged an output of new products. Kolchugino partnership became a pioneer in the development of new alloys, which is why it got more than 60% of all state orders in Russia for copper and brass sheets and plates. The Kolchugino plant became famous exhibiting more than 20 product items in the International Fair in Paris. Kolchugino podstakanniks, samovars, wares and cutlery are known all over the world up to the present.

In 1922 after development of new types of products from nichrome, beryllium and bronze the plant started manufacturing of the "winged metal" developed together with A. Tupolev for their aircraft industry.

In the 1930s a method of brass manufacturing by hot rolling was developed.

In 1931 a village became a town Kolchugino.

In 1939 the government made a decision about forming a cable and metal-weaving production into a separate enterprise: "Electrocable" plant.

During World War II the plant together with four thousand workers was evacuated in Ural that gave rise to five plants: in Orsk, Kamensk-Uralskiy, Revda, Balkhash and Verkhnaya Salda.

Despite a hard post-war period the plant continued the started technical re-equipment.

Early in 1970 the metallurgists put into operation some shops manufactured copper tubes, flat bars etc.

In 1978 a new house producing consumer goods was put into operation; in 1983 - a new foundry; in 1988 - a new shop of complex alloys.

At the same time a new housing estate, new therapeutic and surgical departments of a hospital and other public amenities were built, and cultural and educational institutions were opened.

In 1997 the tableware division of Kolchugino plant became a joint stock company and took the name JSC TH Kolchug-Mizar.

== See also ==
- Podstakanniki in Russian Wikipedia
