= Copo americano =

Brazilian glassware

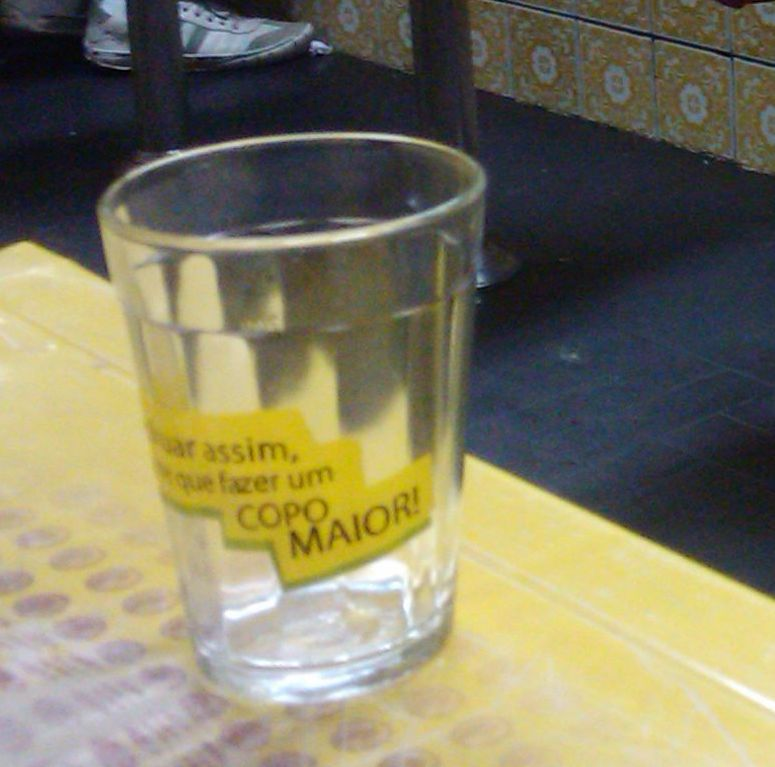
A copo americano

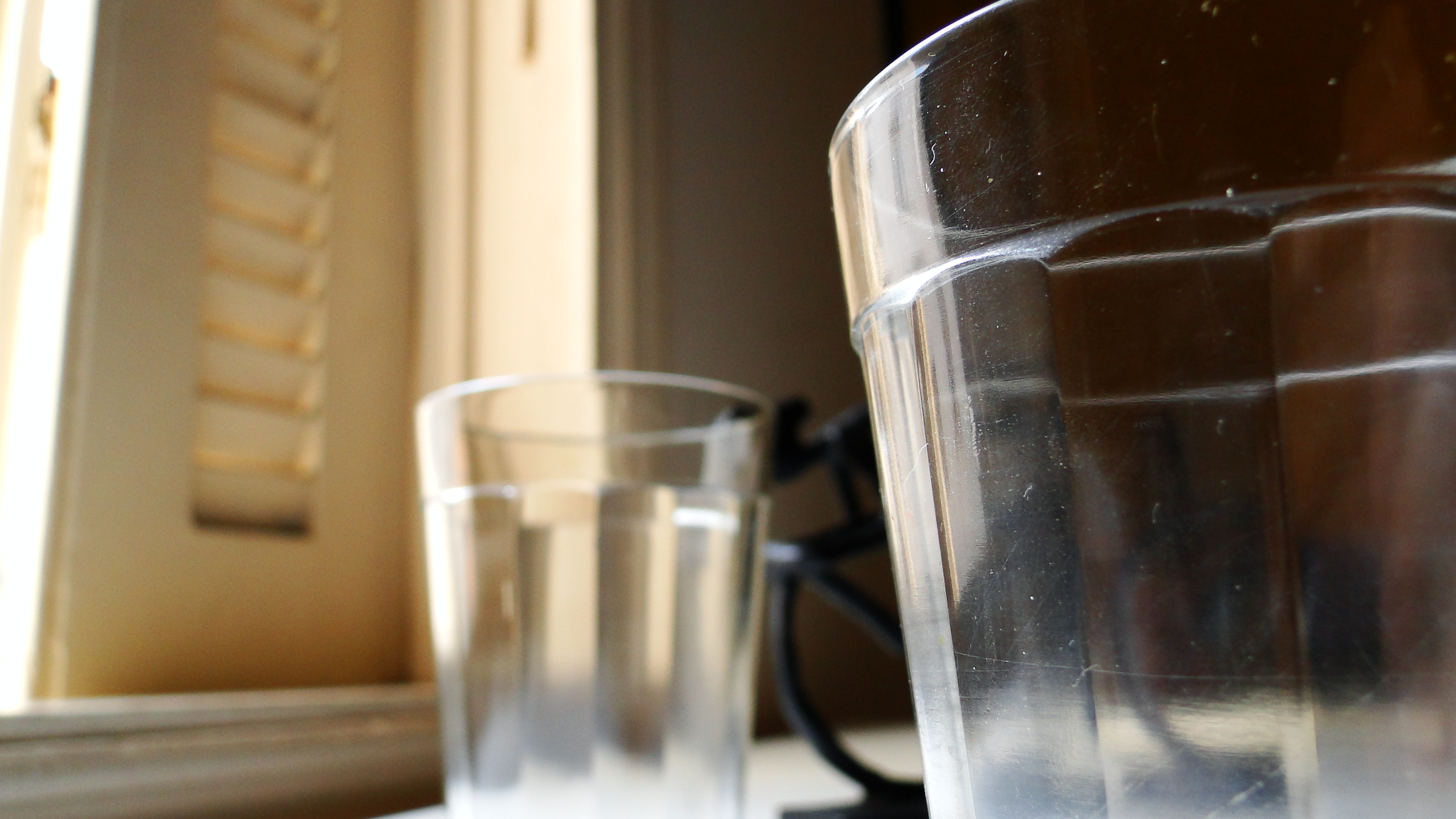
Copo americano glasses

In Brazil, the copo americano ('American glass') is a 190 ml (6.7 imp fl oz; 6.4 US fl oz) capacity model of drinking glass developed by the Belo Horizonte - based Nadir Figueiredo company in 1947.

== Relevance ==
It is the most common item of glassware in Brazil, with over 6 billion units having been produced since its creation. It is used throughout casual restaurants and bars in the country, and also considered as a standard unit of measure for Brazilian recipes.

== History ==
The name americano refers to machinery imported from the United States that was used in the 1940s to produce the first piece.

=== Design ===
A style of faceted glass similar to the one created in 1943 by sculptor Vera Mukhina, it is seen as an icon of Brazil and a part of the country's history, having been exhibited at the MOMA in 2009 as a symbol of Brazilian design.

=== Ascension ===
In Belo Horizonte, it is also known as the copo lagoinha due to its wide usage in the bohemian area of Belo Horizonte known as Bairro Lagoinha. In the wholesaler market, it is known simply as "Americano" or "2010" – which is its internal reference code (102010188) from the manufacturer Nadir Figueiredo S/A.

== See also ==
- Faceted glass
