= Chifir =

Tea drink

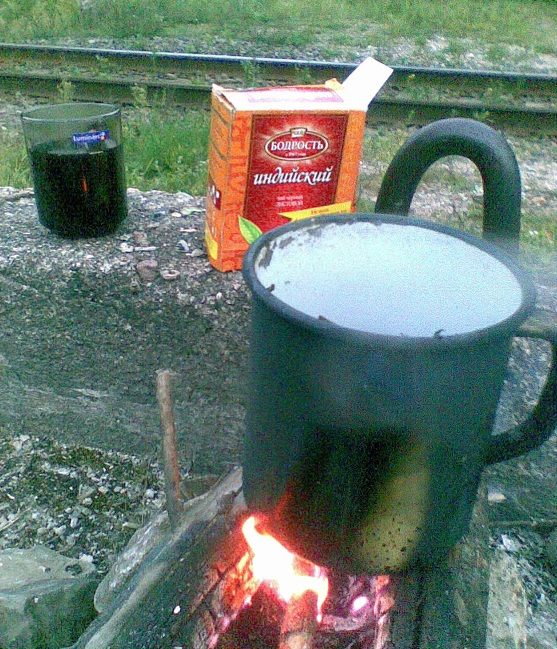
Preparation of chifir in an enamel mug

Chifir (Russian: чифирь, romanized: chifir', or alternatively, чифир (chifir)) is an exceptionally strong tea, associated with and brewed in Soviet and post-Soviet detention facilities such as gulags and prisons.

== Etymology ==
The etymology is uncertain but is thought to come from the word chikhir' (чихирь) meaning a strong Caucasian wine, or a Siberian word for wine that has gone off and become sour and acidic.

== Preparation ==
Chifir is typically prepared with 5–8 tablespoons (50–100 ml) of loose tea (or tea bags) per person poured on top of the boiled water. It is brewed without stirring – at least until the leaves drop to the bottom of the cup. During the brewing process, the leaves start to release adenine and guanine into the water, which does not happen during traditional tea-making. Sugar is sometimes added; the nature of the brew tends to result in a bitter flavor.

It is to be carefully sipped, otherwise it may cause vomiting. Ultimately, making chifir involves brewing a great deal of black tea and for a long time. It may be left to brew overnight and drunk either hot or cold.

== In popular culture ==
- Irina Ratushinskaya describes the brewing of narcotically strong chifir as a banned activity sometimes undertaken by prisoners, in her memoir of her years as a political prisoner, Grey Is The Colour Of Hope.
- In the Gabriele Salvatores-directed film Deadly Code, the character played by John Malkovich prepares and describes chifir to the young Kolyma.

== See also ==
- Sa'idi tea, a somewhat similar beverage (essentially a weaker grade, but consumed in larger quantities) drunk in Upper Egypt and among Sa'idi people elsewhere
- Zavarka, concentrated tea used in brewing tea from a Samovar or a diluting with boiling water
- Tanna Tea, a fictional tea enjoyed by the Valhallans from Warhammer 40K and Commissar Ciaphas Cain from the same setting.
