= Urshelsky =

Urshelsky Уршельский
- Settlement
- Location within Vladimir Oblast Location within Russia
- Coordinates: 55°40′38″N 40°13′00″E
- Country: Russia
- Region: Vladimir Oblast
- District: Gus-Khrustalny District
- Time zone: UTC+3:00

Urshelsky (Russian: Уршельский) is a rural locality (a settlement) and the administrative center of Posyolok Urshelsky, Gus-Khrustalny District, Vladimir Oblast, Russia. Population:3,354 (2021 census). The population was 3,783 as of 2010. There are 49 streets.

== Geography ==
Urshelsky is located 40 km west of Gus-Khrustalny (the district's administrative centre) by road. Sintsovo is the nearest rural locality.
