= Kolchugino =

Kolchugino (Russian: Кольчугино) is the name of several inhabited localities in Russia.

== Modern localities ==
Urban localities

- Kolchugino, Vladimir Oblast, a town in Kolchuginsky District of Vladimir Oblast

Rural localities

- Kolchugino, Smolensk Oblast, a village in Vskhodskoye Rural Settlement of Ugransky District in Smolensk Oblast

== Renamed localities ==
- Kolchugino, until 1925, name of Leninsk-Kuznetsky, a city in Kemerovo Oblast
