= Podstakannik =

Russian drinking utensil

Nickel-plated glass holder

The podstakannik (Russian: подстака́нник [pət͡sstɐˈkanʲːɪk], literally "thing under the glass"), or tea glass holder, is a holder with a handle, most commonly made of metal that holds a drinking glass (stakan). Their primary purpose is to be able to hold a very hot glass of tea, which is usually consumed right after it is brewed. The stability of the glass on the table is also significantly improved. It is a traditional way of serving and drinking tea in Russia, Ukraine, Belarus, Poland, and some other Slavic states.

In the 21st century, the podstakannik mostly lost its utilitarian functions and became a souvenir or gift item. The only exception is represented by Russian railroads, where the podstakannik is still used due to the stability it adds to the glass.

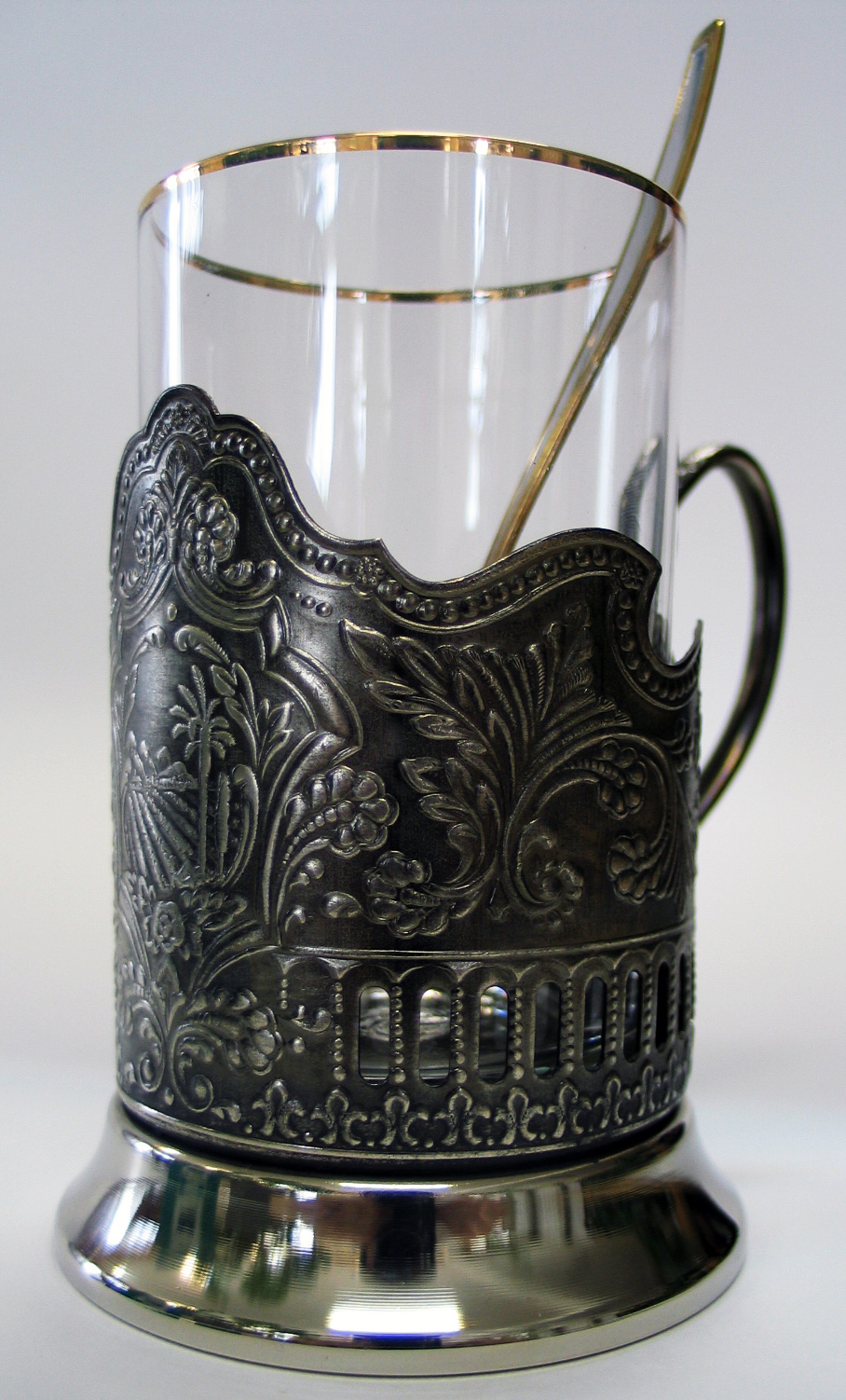
A podstakannik with a glass inside

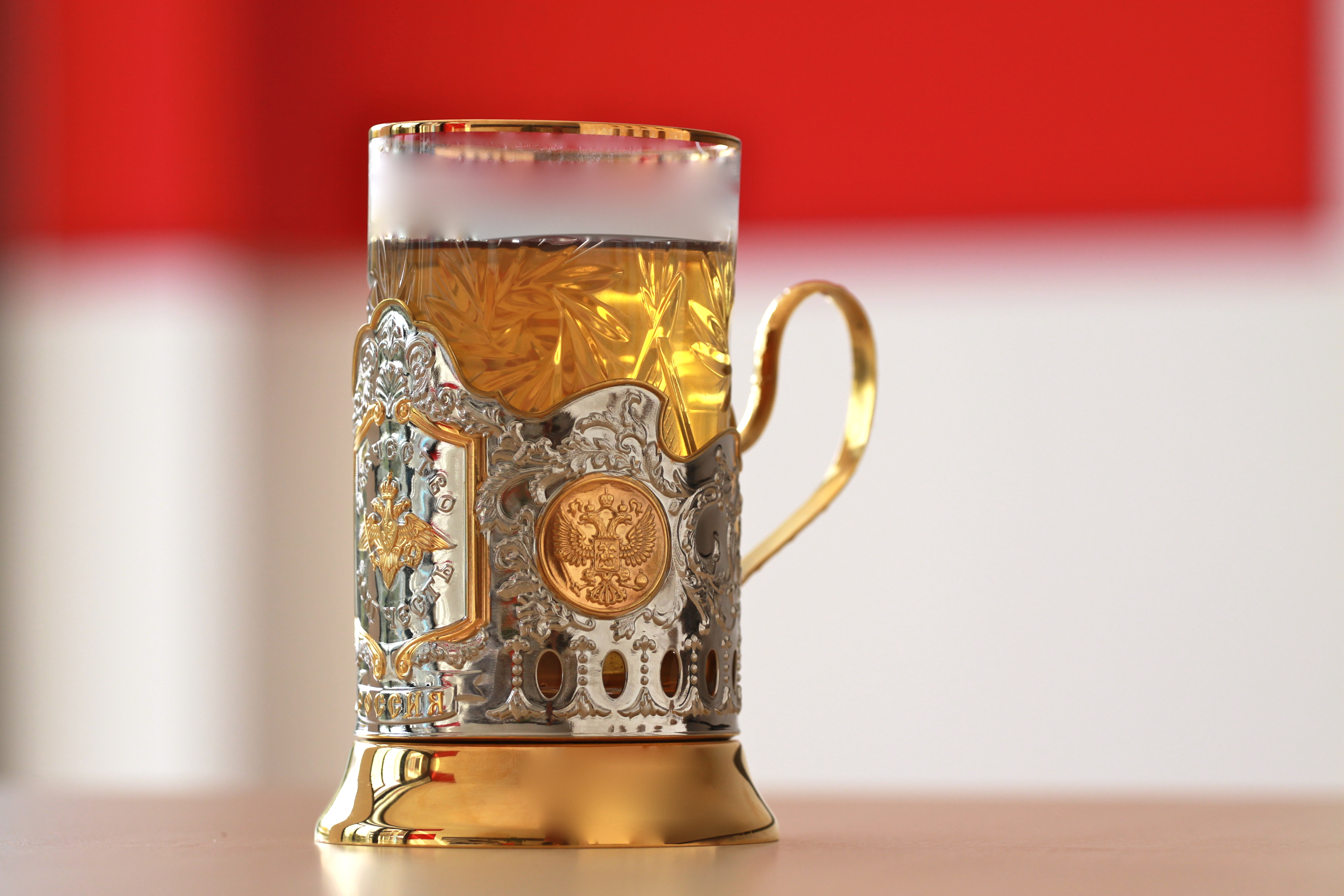
A glass of tea inside a gilded glass holder

== History ==
=== Russia ===
Podstakanniks appeared in Russian tea culture in the late 18th century, when drinking tea became common in Russia. Very soon they became not just practical utensils, but also works of art, just like samovars that were used for boiling water. Expensive podstakanniks for the rich and the elite were made of silver; however, they were not very practical, since they would get quite hot very quickly due to the high thermal conductivity of silver. By the 20th century, podstakanniks became very widespread. They were found extremely useful on railroads, as tea was served in moving carriages that were shaking. A bare glass was more likely to fall, scalding people with hot tea. The mass introduction of podstakannik on railroads is traditionally associated with Sergei Witte (1892). The Russian railroads still use the podstakannik extensively in sleeper carriages and dining cars.

=== Poland ===
In Polish, a tea glass holder is similarly known as podstakannik or podstakanka, but also as koszyczek or koszyk do szklanki (literally "little basket for the glass"). They have been used in Poland since the times of Art Nouveau, but became even more popular there and in other Eastern European countries after World War I. During the interwar period, podstakanniks were produced in the Second Polish Republic on an industrial scale. At first they were popular mostly in middle-class households (particularly in Warsaw, Greater Poland, and Pomerania), but gradually became more widespread among other sectors of society and had become ubiquitous by the time of the Polish People's Republic. The koszyczki were seen as an opportunity to show off the decorative skills and good taste of the family in front of guests. By the 1990s and following Poland's transition into a market economy, podstakanki started being replaced by East German and Western mugs. They have since become fairly uncommon, but are still perceived as a traditional element of Polish applied arts and the old way of serving tea or coffee.

== Production ==
In the Soviet Union they were made mostly from nickel silver, cupronickel, and other alloys with nickel, silver, or gold plating. Though in modern times, simple tea cups or mugs are typically used by Eastern Europeans at home, podstakanniks continue to be widely used for serving tea on the Russian Railways, since they provide more safety while drinking or carrying tea on a moving train. Most Russian tea glass holders have been produced by a plant located in Kolchugino, Vladimir Oblast. Kolchug-Mizar, its name deriving from its location and the alloy melchior, continues to be the main glass holder producer to this day. Some podstakanniks depict architecture, famous people, famous dates in history, cities, etc., giving a good general survey of Russian and Soviet history.

Some similar tea glass holders can occasionally be seen in the West in tea houses and pubs; they are however usually of much simpler design (made of either stainless steel bent wire or even of some plastic material) than those seen in Russia (and in the former USSR).

Russian Kolchugino Glass Holder (made of sterling silver)

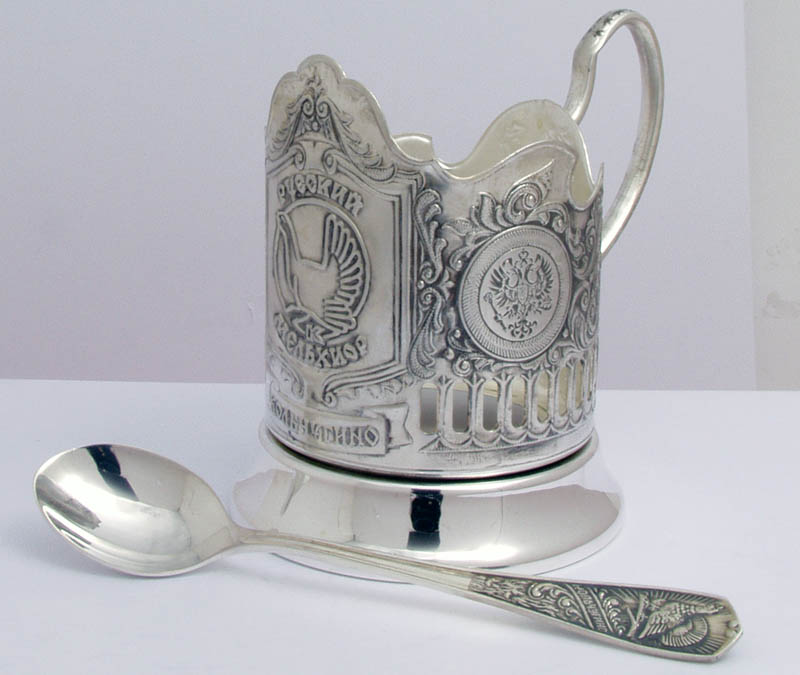
Russian Kolchugino Glass Holder (silver-plated)

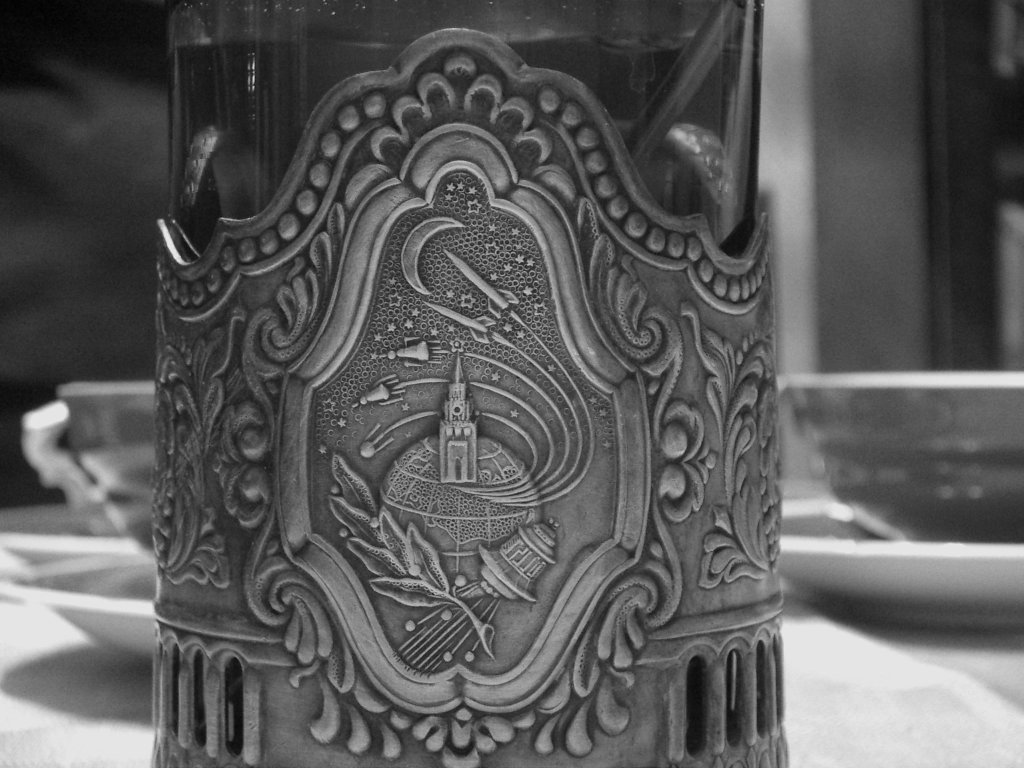
A depiction of Sputnik on 1950s podstakannik

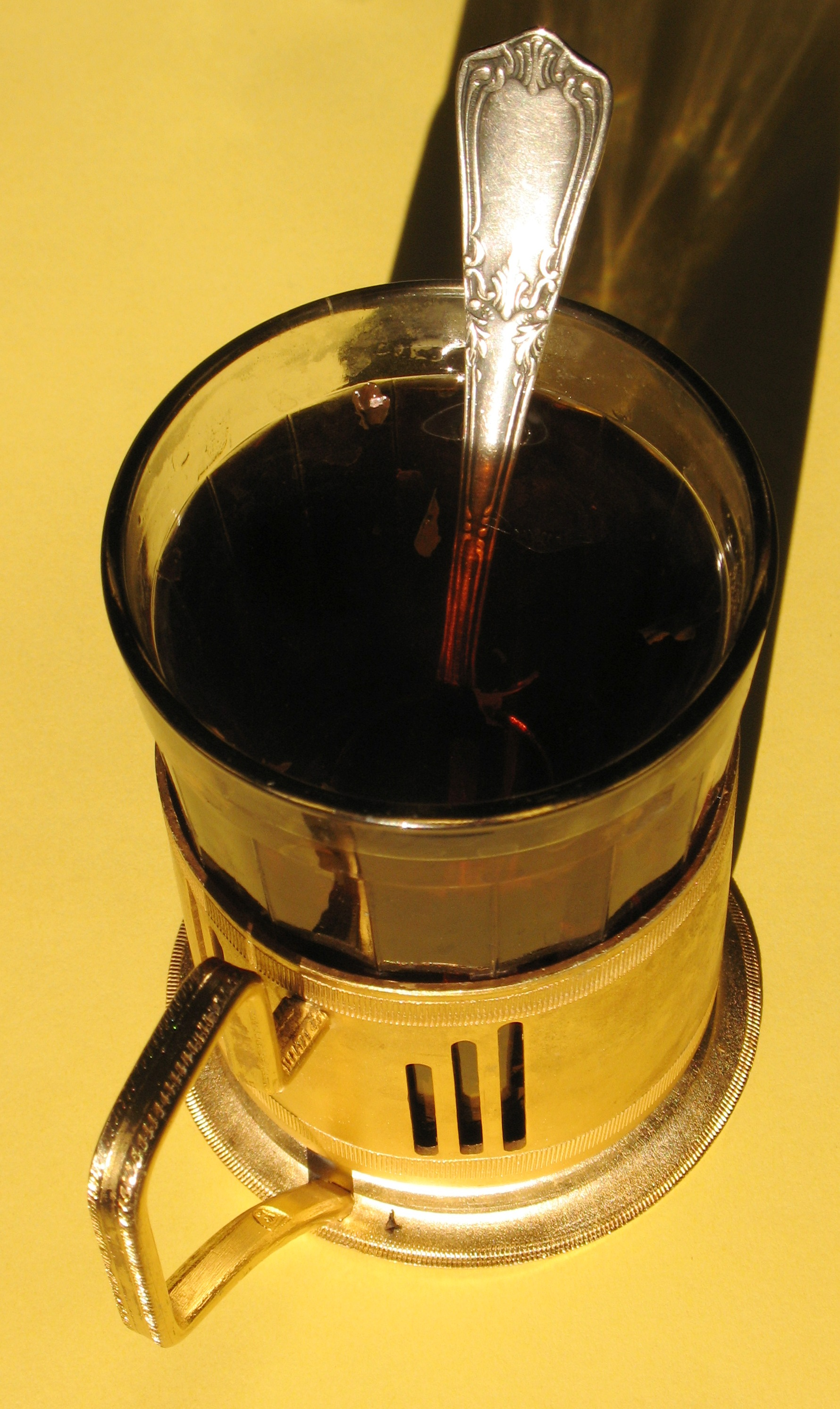
A podstakannik with glass and tea as used on the RZD (Russian Railways)

== See also ==
- Tea
- Tea culture
  - Russian tea culture
- Turkish tea, a style of tea served in clear glasses without a holder
- Zarf

== Sources ==
- Bitkina, Svetlana (2016). Подстаканник [Podstakannik]. Родина (in Russian) (10).
- Evstyukhin, I. (2011). "Предмет культа" [The object of cult]. Вестник культурологии (in Russian) (3): 221–224.
